= Hosokawa Sumimoto =

Japanese samurai commander

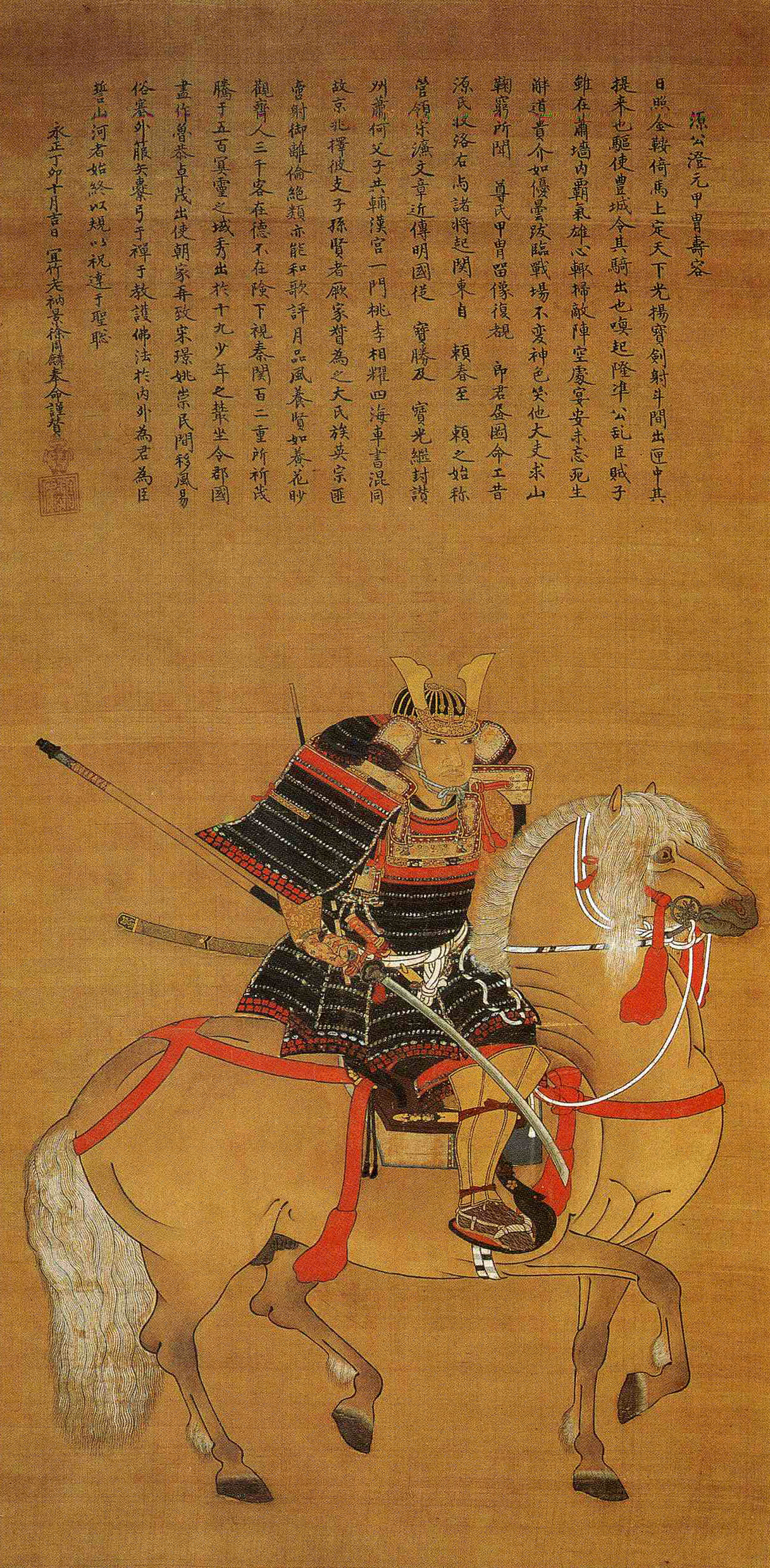
Hosokawa Sumimoto on horseback, painted by Kanō Motonobu

Hosokawa Sumimoto (細川 澄元; 1489 – June 24, 1520) was a samurai commander in the Muromachi period during the 16th century of Japan.

Sumimoto was one of the few sons of Hosokawa Yoshiharu and an adopted son of Hosokawa Masamoto, who was the Kanrei of the Ashikaga shogunate. His roots was the Hosokawa clan at Awa Province. His childhood name was Rokuro (六郎).

Masamoto did not have his own child and originally had decided to let Hosokawa Sumiyuki, who was from Kujō clan, succeed the house. However, he changed his mind later and decided to let Sumimoto, who was adopted after Sumiyuki, succeed the house. This naturally caused a rift between Sumimoto and Sumiyuki.

In 1507, Masamoto was killed by an adherent of Sumiyuki. Sumimoto was attacked by a retainer of Sumiyuki, Kozai Motonaga, and escaped to Koga, Ōmi Province, taking refuge at Rokkaku Takayori. Sumiyuki was recognized by the shogun, who had been installed by Masamoto, as the head of the Hosokawa. However his rule, and life, lasted for less than a month afterwards. Supported by the troops of his allies Miyoshi Yukinaga (Nagateru) and the son of Yakushiji Motoichi, raised troops in Settsu and destroyed Sumiyuki in the young Sumimoto's name; Sumiyuki committed suicide and Kozai Motonaga was killed. The next day, the shogun appointed Sumimoto as the successor of the Hosokawa.

He and Hosokawa Takakuni, who was from another branch of Hosokawa clan and also another foster son of Masamoto, supported Ashikaga Yoshizumi, who was backed up to the 11th shōgun by Masamoto. In 1493, Masamoto had deposed the 10th Shōgun Ashikaga Yoshiki (Yoshitane), who later escaped from confinement and fled to eastern countries, looking for a chance to regain his position.

In 1508, Ōuchi Yoshioki, who then harbored Yoshiki, marched his armies into Kyoto and returned Yoshiki back to the seat of Shōgun. The relationship between Sumimoto and Takakuni was no longer in harmony, and while Takakuni acted in concert with Yoshioki, Sumimoto was exiled to Ōmi Province. Sumimoto intended to battle Yoshioki in the province of Settsu, but ended up fleeing to Awa after seeing the superior numbers of Yoshioki's army.

In 1511, Sumitomo returned to Kyoto but was defeated by Takakuni and the Ōuchi at Funaokayama and fled once more. The death of Yoshizumi was another shock to the camp of Sumimoto.

Ōuchi Yoshioki left the capital in 1518 to maintain his own dominion, and regarding this as a chance, Sumimoto attempted another movement on Kyoto in the next year, cooperating with Miyoshi Yukinaga. However, Yukinaga was attacked and defeated by Hosokawa Takakuni and the clan of Rokkaku, who were then at the side of Ashikaga Yoshiki. Yukinaga was caught and forced to die by seppuku. Sumimoto was ill and had not advanced to Kyoto. After Yukinaga's defeat, he escaped again to his home province of Awa and died soon afterward.

== Family ==
- Father: Hosokawa Yoshiharu (1468–1495)
- Foster father: Hosokawa Masamoto
- Wife: Seitai-in
- Children:
  - Hosokawa Harumoto
  - A daughter who married Hatakeyama Yoshitaka
  - A daughter who married Arima Shigenori
