= Emperor Go-Kashiwabara =

Emperor of Japan from 1500 to 1526

Emperor Go-Kashiwabara 後柏原天皇
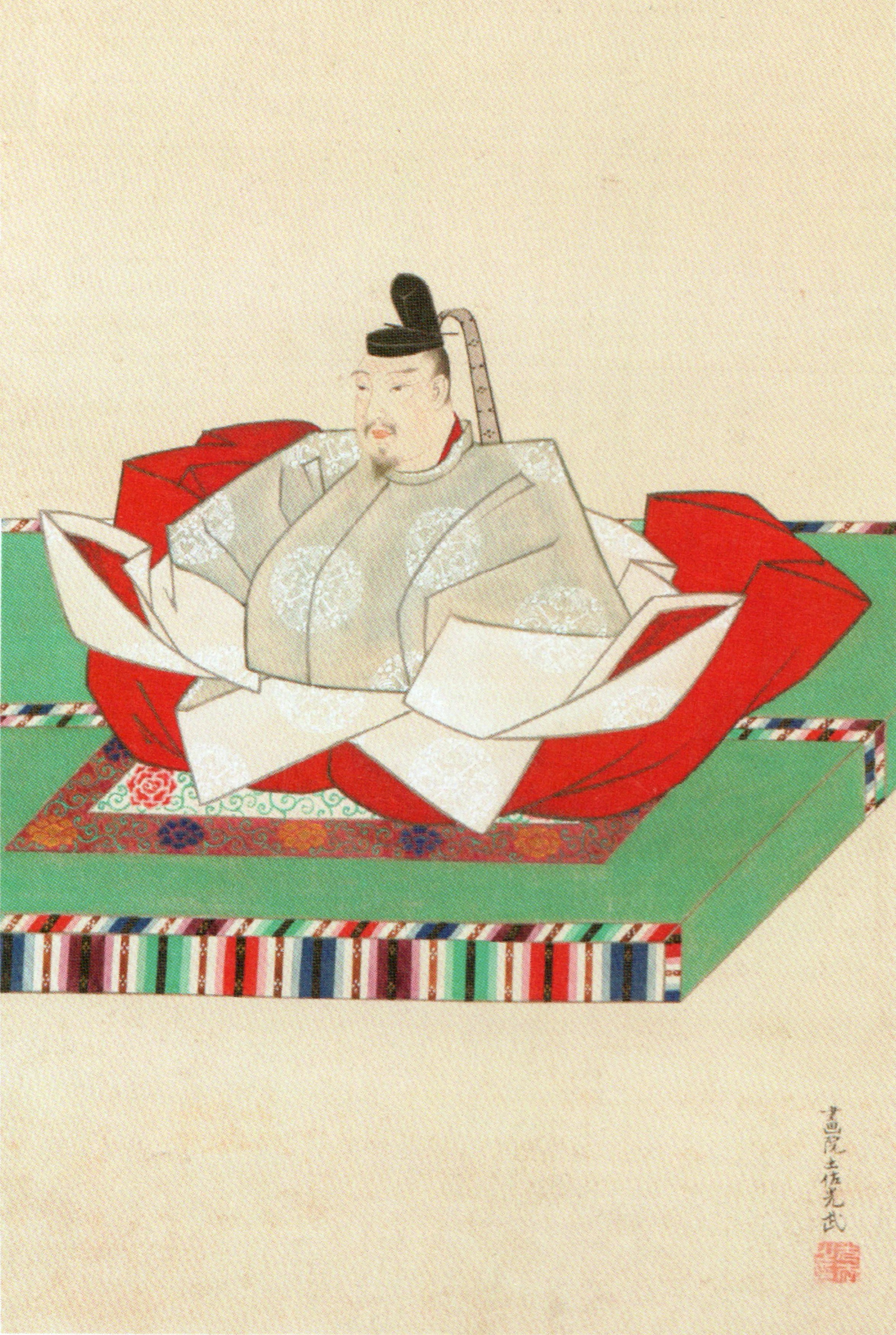
- Portrait by Tosa Mitsutake, 19th century

Emperor of Japan
- Reign: November 16, 1500 – May 18, 1526
- Enthronement: April 28, 1521
- Predecessor: Go-Tsuchimikado
- Successor: Go-Nara
- Shōguns: See list: Ashikaga Yoshizumi; Ashikaga Yoshitane; Ashikaga Yoshiharu
- Born: Katsuhito (勝仁); November 19, 1462
- Died: May 18, 1526 (aged 63)
- Burial: Fukakusa no kita no Misasagi (深草北陵) Kyoto
- Issue more...: Emperor Go-Nara
Posthumous name
- Tsuigō: Emperor Go-Kashiwabara (後柏原院 or 後柏原天皇)
- House: Imperial House of Japan
- Father: Emperor Go-Tsuchimikado
- Mother: Niwata (Minamoto) Asako
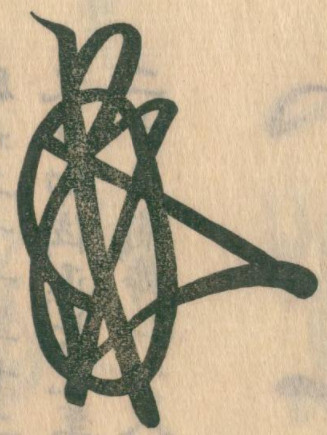
- Signature

Emperor Go-Kashiwabara (後柏原天皇, Go-Kashiwabara-tennō; November 19, 1462 – May 18, 1526) was the 104th emperor of Japan, according to the traditional order of succession. He reigned from November 16, 1500, to his death on May 18, 1526. His personal name was Katsuhito (勝仁). His reign marked the nadir of Imperial authority during the Ashikaga shogunate.

== Genealogy ==
He was the first son of Emperor Go-Tsuchimikado. His mother was Niwata (Minamoto) Asako (庭田（源）朝子), the daughter of Niwata Nagakata (庭田長賢).

- Lady-in-waiting: Kajūji (Fujiwara) Fujiko (1464–1535; 勧修寺（藤原）藤子) later Hōraku-mon'in (豊楽門院), Kajūji Norihide’s daughter
  - First daughter: Princess Kakuten (1486–1550; 覚鎮女王)
  - First son:?? (1493)
  - Second son: Imperial Prince Tomohito (知仁親王) later Emperor Go-Nara
  - Fifth son: Imperial Prince Kiyohiko (1504–1550; 清彦親王) later Imperial Prince Priest Sonten (尊鎮法親王)
- Lady-in-waiting: Niwata (Minamoto) Motoko (庭田（源）源子), Niwata Masayuki’s daughter
  - Third son: Imperial Prince Priest Kakudō (1500–1527; 覚道法親王)
  - Second daughter: Princess Kakuon (1506–?; 覚音女王)
  - Sixth son: Imperial Prince Hirotsune (1509–1536; 寛恒親王) later Imperial Prince Priest Gen'in (彦胤法親王)
- Handmaid (?): Takakura (Fujiwara) Tsuguko (高倉（藤原）継子), Takakura Nagatsugu’s daughter
  - Fourth son: Doko (1503–1530; 道喜)

== Events of Go-Kashiwabara's life ==
In 1500, he became Emperor upon the death of his father, the Emperor Go-Tsuchimikado. However, because of the after-effects of the Ōnin War, the Imperial Family was left so impoverished that he was unable to perform the formal coronation ceremony. On the 3rd month, 22nd day of 1521, thanks to contributions from Honganji Jitsunyo (本願寺実如, Rennyo's son) and the Muromachi Bakufu, the Emperor was finally able to carry out this ceremony.

Because of the Ōnin War, the scattering of the Court Nobility, and the poverty of the Imperial Court, the Emperor's authority fell to a low point.

- Bunki 1 (1501): The former Shōgun Ashikaga Yoshimura was exiled; and he retired to Suō Province. The former shōgun lived in exile in the home of the daimyō of that han. He changed his name to Ashikaga Yoshitane. He had many supporters, and he summoned the military forces of western Japan to come to his aid. Hosokawa Masamoto was made master of all the provinces which encircled the Kinai.
- Bunki 2, in the 7th month (1502): Minamoto Yoshitane was elevated to the 2nd tier of the 4th class of kuge officials; and he expressed thanks to the emperor for that honor. In the same month, the name of Ashikaga Yoshitaka was changed to that of Yoshizumi.
- Bunki 3 (1503): There was a great drought in the summer of this year.
- Eishō 1 (1504): A great famine.
- Eishō 5, in the 1st month (1508): A new revolt in Miyako and the assassination of Hosokawa Masamoto encouraged former-Shōgun Ashikaga Yoshitane in believing that this would be a good opportunity to re-take Miyako. He assembled his troops and marched at their head towards the capital; and by the 6th month of Eishō 5, he was once more in command of the streets of Miyako. Starting in 1508, Yoshitane is known as the Muromachi period's 10th shōgun
- Eishō 9, following the Three Ports Riots of 1510 in Joseon Korea, the Emperor made concessions that led to the Agreement of 1512 and reconciliation with the Korean government.
- Daiei 5, on the 1st day of the 1st month (1525): All ceremonies in the court were suspended because of the lack of funds to support them.
- Daiei 6, on the 7th day of the 4th month (1525): Go-Kashiwabara died at the age of 63 years. He had reigned 26 years; that is, his reign lasted 3 years in the nengō Bunki, 17 years in the nengō Eishō, and 6 years in the nengō Daiei. The emperor was found dead in his archives.

Emperor Go-Kashiwabara is enshrined with other emperors at the imperial tomb called Fukakusa no kita no misasagi (深草北陵) in Fushimi-ku, Kyoto.

=== Kugyō ===
Kugyō (公卿) is a collective term for the very few most powerful men attached to the court of the Emperor of Japan in pre-Meiji eras. Even during those years in which the court's actual influence outside the palace walls was minimal, the hierarchic organization persisted.

In general, this elite group included only three to four men at a time. These were hereditary courtiers whose experience and background would have brought them to the pinnacle of a life's career. During Go-Kashiwabara's reign, this apex of the Daijō-kan included:

- Sadaijin
- Udaijin
- Naidaijin
- Dainagon

== Eras of Go-Kashiwabara's reign ==
The years of Go-Kashiwabara's reign are more specifically identified by more than one era name or nengō.

- Meiō (1492–1501)
- Bunki (1501–1504)
- Eishō (1504–1521)
- Daiei (1521–1528)

== Ancestry ==
Ancestors of Emperor Go-Kashiwabara

8. Prince of the Blood Fushimi-no-miya Sadafusa (1372–1456)
4. Emperor Go-Hanazono (1419–1471)
9. Niwata Sachiko (1390–1448)
2. Emperor Go-Tsuchimikado (1442–1500)
10. Fujiwara Takahara
5. Ōinomikado Nobuko (1411–1488)
1. Emperor Go-Kashiwabara
12. Niwata Shigeari (1378–1440)
6. Niwata Nagakata (d. 1487)
3. Niwata Asako (1437–1492)

== Notes ==
Japanese Imperial kamon — a stylized chrysanthemum blossom

== See also ==
- Emperor of Japan
- List of Emperors of Japan
- Imperial cult

Regnal titles
Preceded by Emperor Go-Tsuchimikado	Emperor of Japan: Go-Kashiwabara; 1500–1526	Succeeded by Emperor Go-Nara
