= Kanō Motonobu =

Japanese painter (1476–1559)

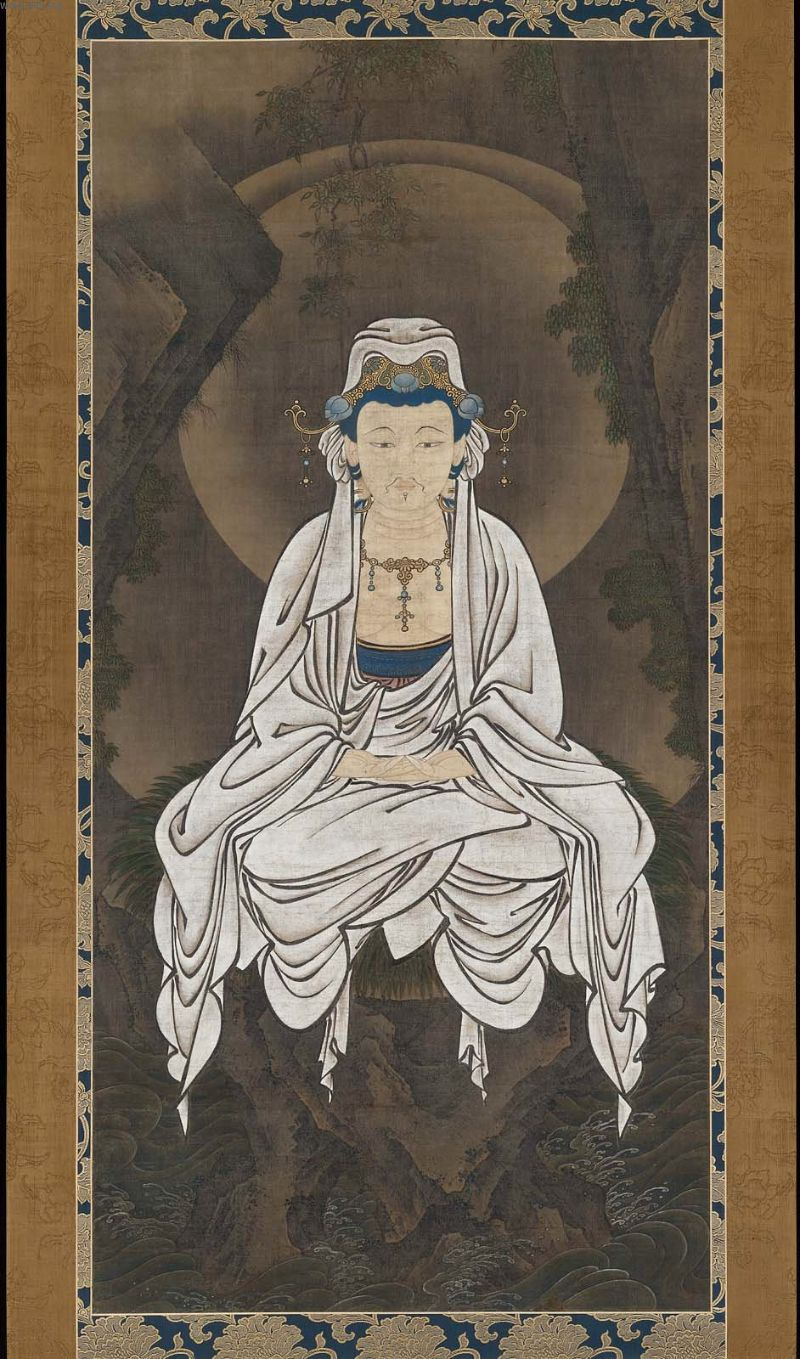
White-robed Kannon, Bodhisattva of Compassion

Kanō Motonobu (狩野 元信; August 28, 1476 – November 5, 1559) was a Japanese painter and calligrapher. He was a member of the Kanō school of painting. Through his political connections, patronage, organization, and influence he was able to make the Kanō school into what it is today. The system was responsible for the training of a great majority of painters throughout the Edo period (1603–1868). After his death, he was referred to as Kohōgen (古法眼).

== Family background ==
The Kanō family are presumed to be the descendants from a line of warriors from the Kanō district. The Kanō district is now called Shizuoka Prefecture. The forebear of this family was Kanō Kagenobu. He seems to have been a retainer of the Imagawa family. It has been reported that he painted a picture of Mount Fuji for a visit to the shōgun Ashikaga Yoshinori in 1432. The Kanō family dominated the painting world from the end of the Muromachi period (1336–1573) to the end of the Edo period (1603–1868).

Kanō Masanobu, Motonobu's father, was the founder of the Kanō school. Kanō Masanobu was the official court painter to the Ashikaga shogunate in 1481. Masanobu was a professional artist whose style derived from the Kanga style (Chinese-style ink painting). Masanobu’s descendants were the people that made up the Kanō school. The Kanō school had secular ink painters.

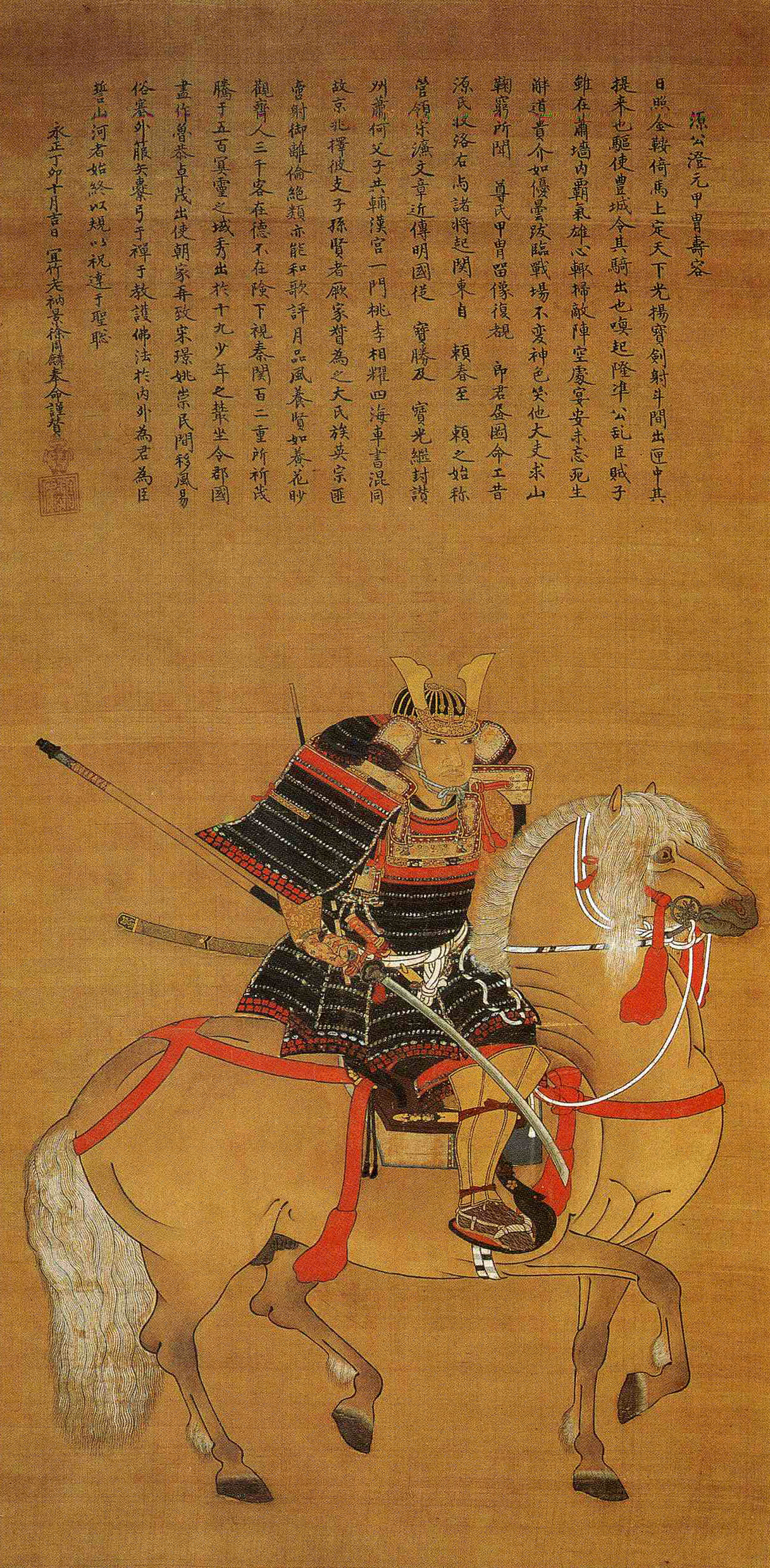
Hosokawa Sumimoto on Horseback by Kanō Motonobu, Eisei Bunko Museum, 1507

== Career ==
At the age of 10, he became an attendant of general Yoshihisa Ashikaga, and it is said that he served Yoshizumi Ashikaga.

Since Kanō Motonobu was a son and heir of the founder of the Kanō School, Kanō Masanobu, he was likely trained in Kanga (Chinese-style ink painting) by his father. Right away Motonobu showed great promise as an artist and procured several commissions from major patrons as early as nine years old. Such patrons include the Ashikaga shogunate, members of the imperial aristocracy, Kyoto merchant class, and major Kyoto shrines and temples.

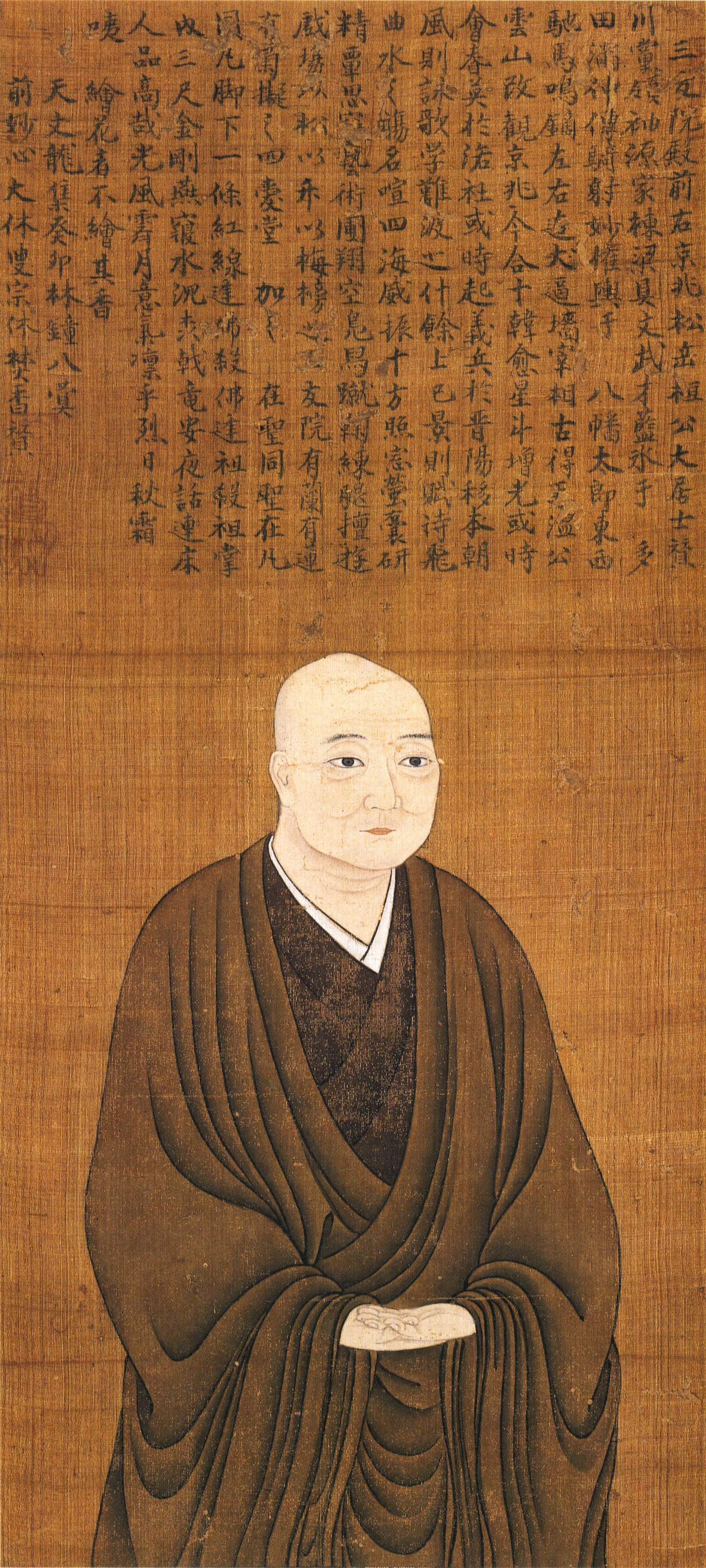
Portrait of Hosokawa Takakuni by Kanō Motonobu, Tōrin-in, 1543

One of his earliest documented contracts was for a set of votive plaques (e-ma) depicting for the Thirty-six Poetry Immortals for the Shinto shrine of Itsukushima. It was commissioned by a group of Sakai merchants in 1515 and the pieces are now located in Hiroshima Prefecture.

By the 1530s Motonobu had married the daughter of the head of the Tosa School of painting, Tosa Mitsunobu, had three sons (Shōei [1519–1592], Yusetsu [1514–1562], and Joshin), and lead a small Kanō sect in northern Kyoto. The workshop contains roughly ten people containing Motonobu, his three sons, Motonobu’s younger brother Yukinobu (1513–1575), and some assistants that might have not been blood related. Since Motonobu was the head or chief architect of these paintings he took on the contracting, production, and organization of the projects while still being very involved with the marketing of his work and his studio. Known for his charm and intellect, Motonobu became a fierce businessman, and frequently petitioned to the shogun for a vast amount of varied commissions with his fellow merchant, Hasuike Hideaki.

Motonobu is a painter who survived the turbulent world of the Warring States period while receiving the patronage of the influential people of the time, such as the shogunate, the imperial court, Ishiyama Hongan-ji, and the influential townspeople.

However, the time he spent marketing did not deter him from his paintings. As head of the Kanō school, he took the most important rooms in a building commissioned, and then assigned his son and assistants other projects based on hierarchy. These projects could be painting their own rooms independently or grinding pigments, preparing the paper, painting the background color, or simply filled in large areas of color. As a result of Motonobu's marketing skills, the commissions grew allowing the workshop and school itself to expand. Motonobu trained his workshop which was full of members of his family and other apprentices to execute his many designs. The workshop trained other artists by watching the master painter work and emphasised recreating their master's style.

As a professional painter, he left works in a variety of genres, including portraits such as that of "Iio Munegi" (Museum of Fine Arts, Boston) and the "Kamo Shimba Zukaku" (votive tablet depicting a horse) for the Kamo Shrine in Hyogo Prefecture, both of which are still extant.

== Style ==
Motonobu was known for his Chinese monochromatic style and characteristic brushwork, pioneering the suiboku-ga (sumi-e) painting style in Japan. The forms were organic, natural, and full of drama. Motonobu's commissions were generally designed for in the home of the samurai warrior class, focusing on fusuma and byōbu. His sumi-e style paintings are reported to take inspiration from three distinct Chinese masters of the sumi-e technique, Mu-ch'i Fa-ch'ang, Hsia Kuei, and Yü Chien (c. 1230).

However, he was versatile in his painting and was able to produce landscapes, scenery, and figures of bold decorative patterns. This was likely due to his father-in-law being head of the Tosa school, Tosa Mitsunobu, who was famous for his revival of the yamato-e style. Noted works in the yamato-e style include a set of hand scrolls Seiryō-ji no engi ("Origins of Seiryō-ji", 1515; Kyoto, Seiryō-ji), and some fusuma wall paintings. By mastering these two distinct styles, Motonobu's artistic skills could be tailored to match his respective patron and create a unique fusion of Chinese and Japanese style. This fusion of Chinese style and iconography with Japanese aesthetics is what helped the Kanō school achieve the legendary status it is known for today.

He also was a master in calligraphy, specifically the formal style known as shintai ("new form"), the more informal form known as gyōsho ("running style"), and the running style sōsho ("grass", very cursive style).

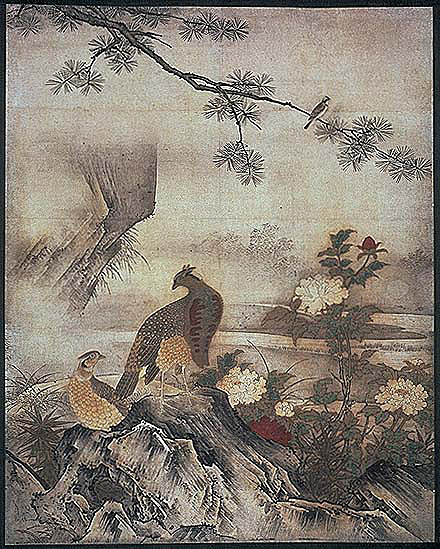
Birds and Flowers of the Four Seasons, 1513, 139x170 cm. Daisen-in, Daitoku-ji, Kyoto.

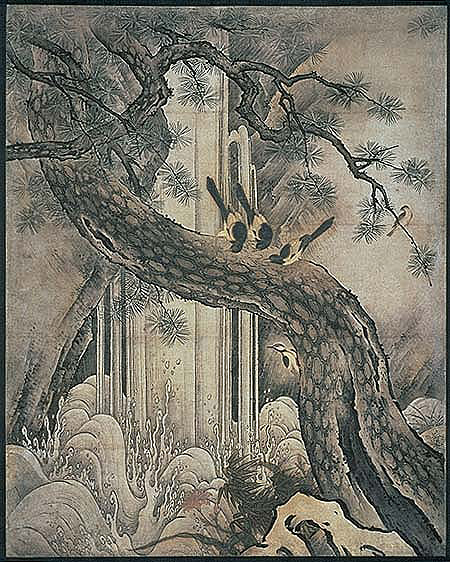
Birds and Flowers of the Four Seasons, 1513, 139x170 cm. Daisen-in, Daitoku-ji, Kyoto.

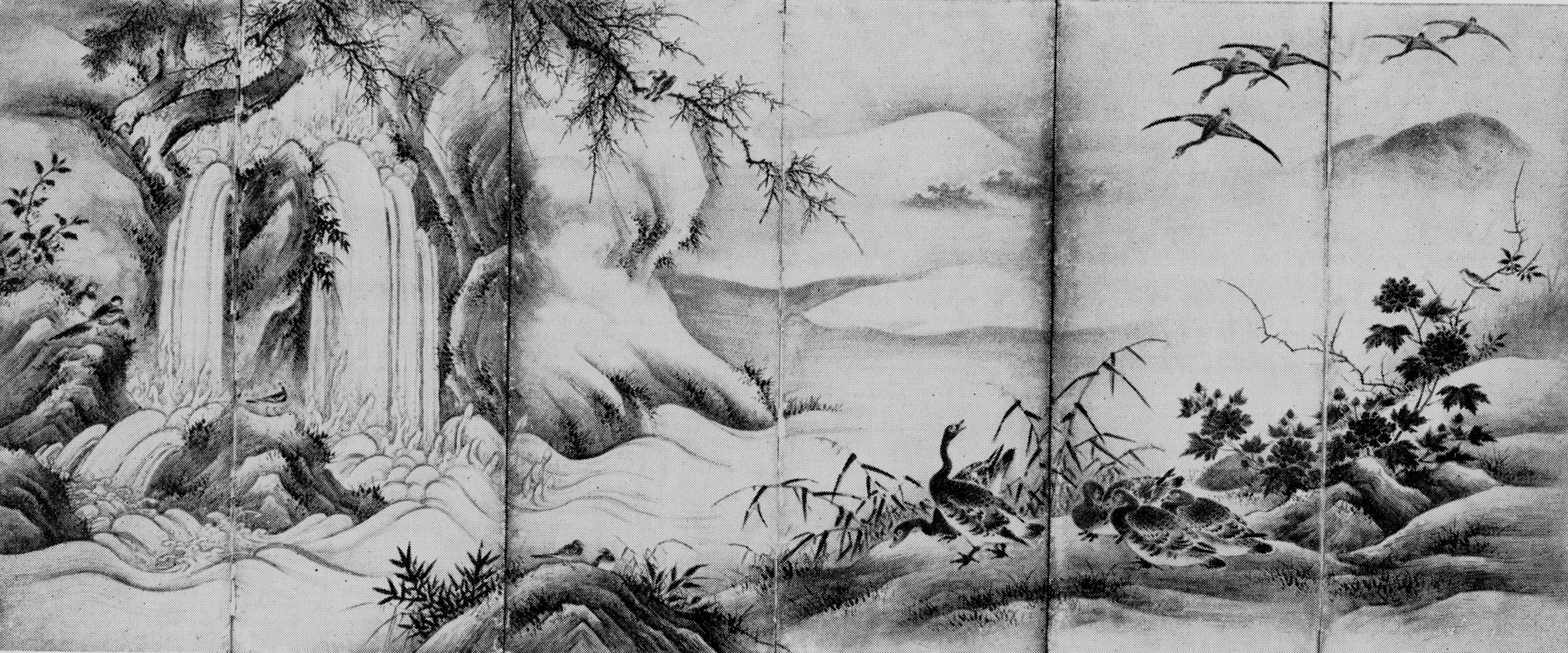
Four Seasons (Autumn and Winter), 1560.

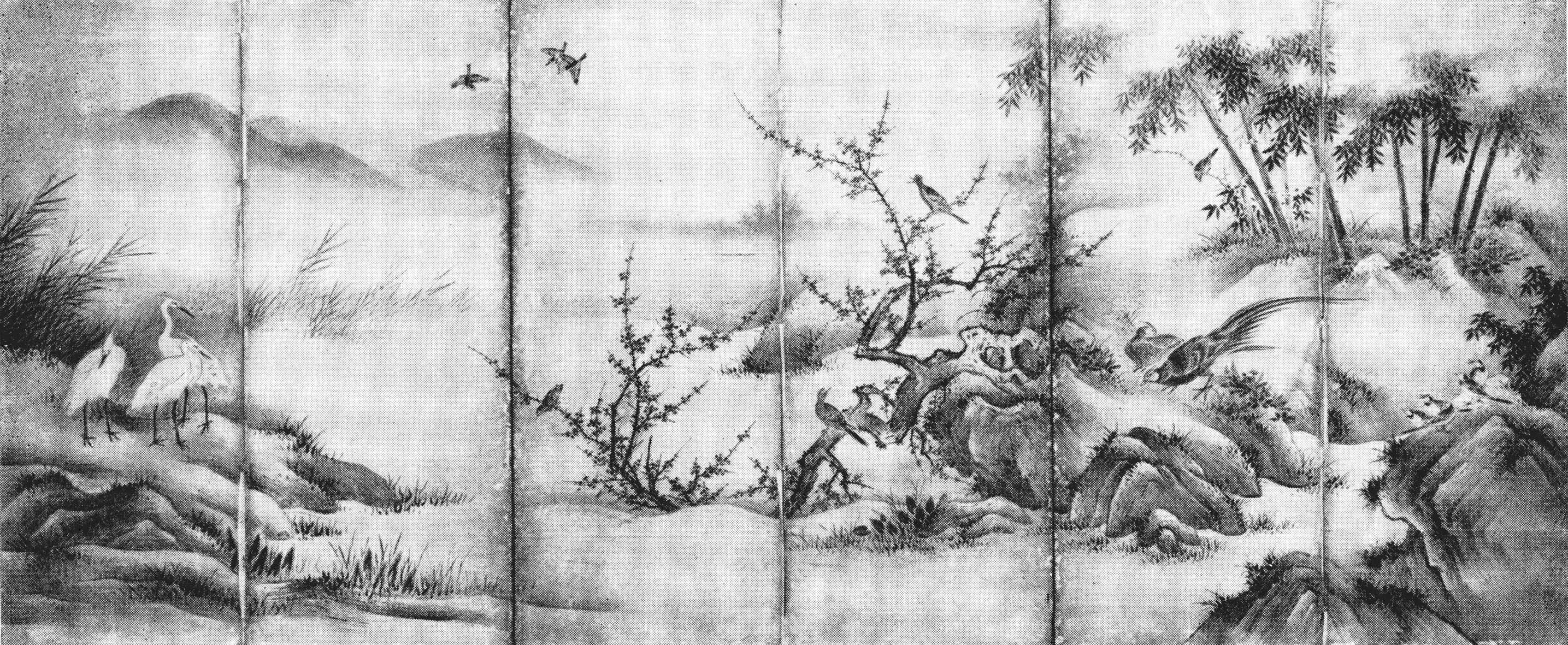
Four Seasons (Spring and Summer), 1560.

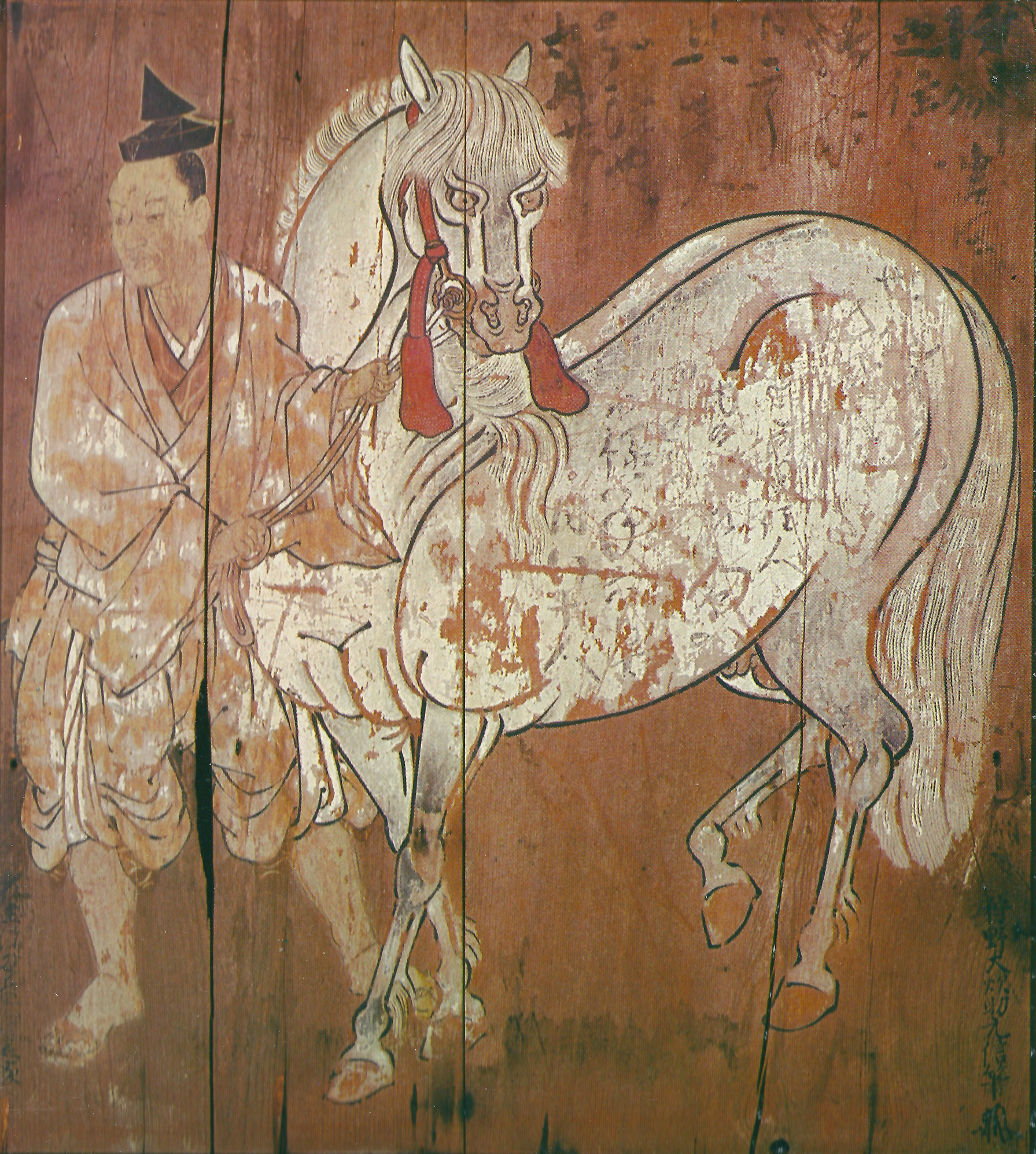
Ema (votive horse), Important Cultural Property of Japan, Hyōgo Prefecture.

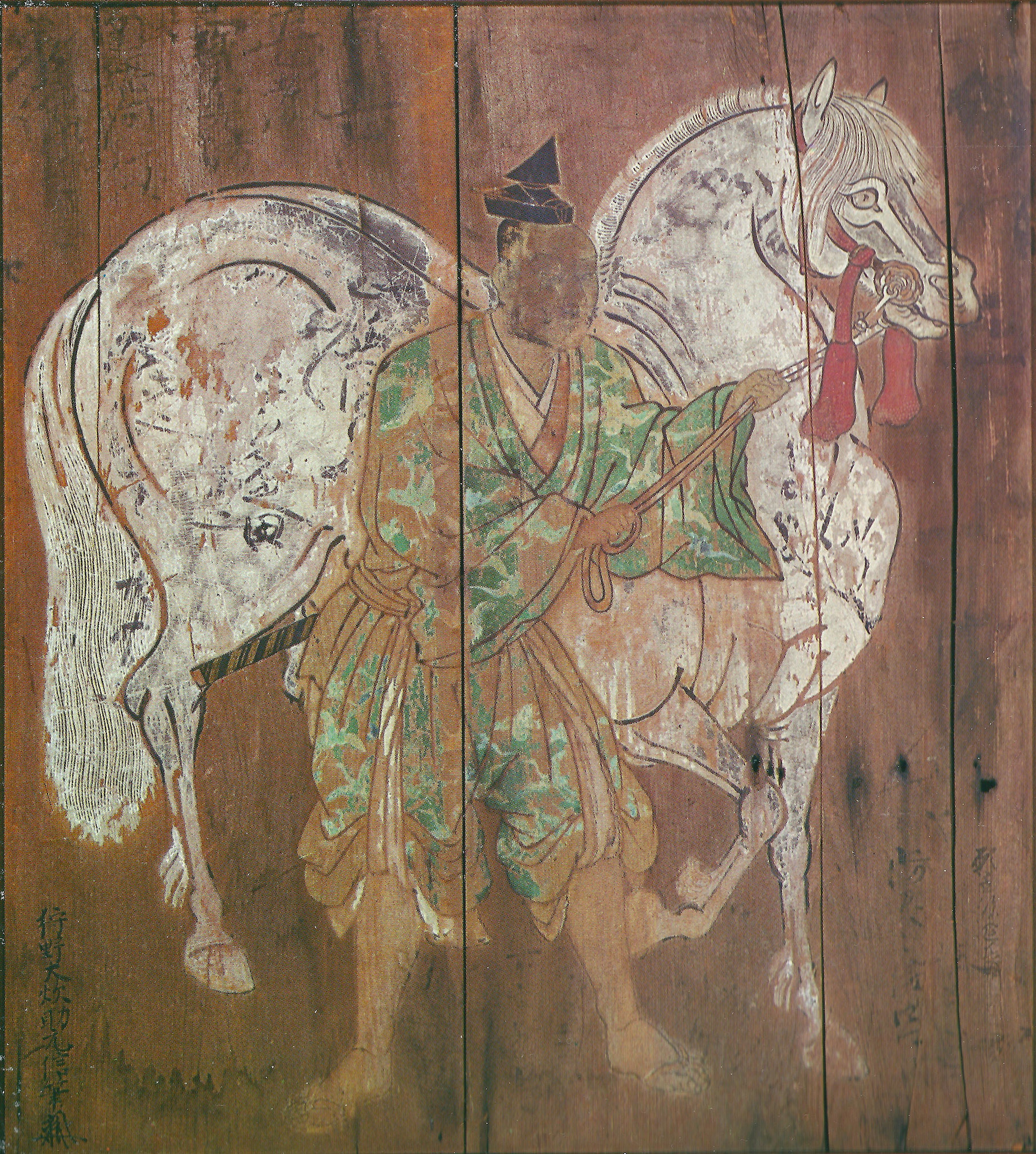
Ema (votive horse), Important Cultural Property of Japan, Hyōgo Prefecture.

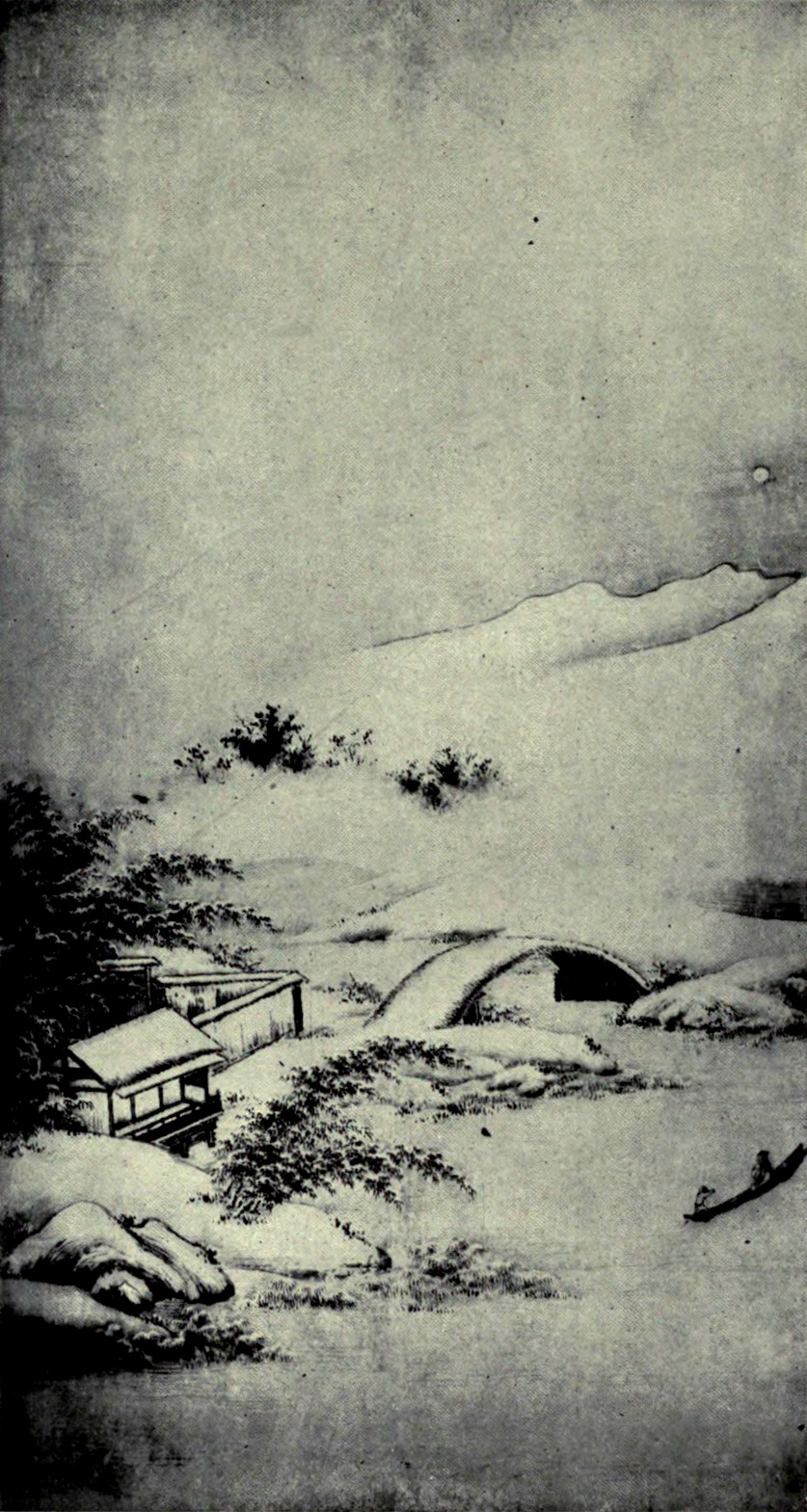
Landscape in snow, between 1476 and 1559. Published in Encyclopædia Britannica, 11th Ed., Vol. 15, 1911, page 176.

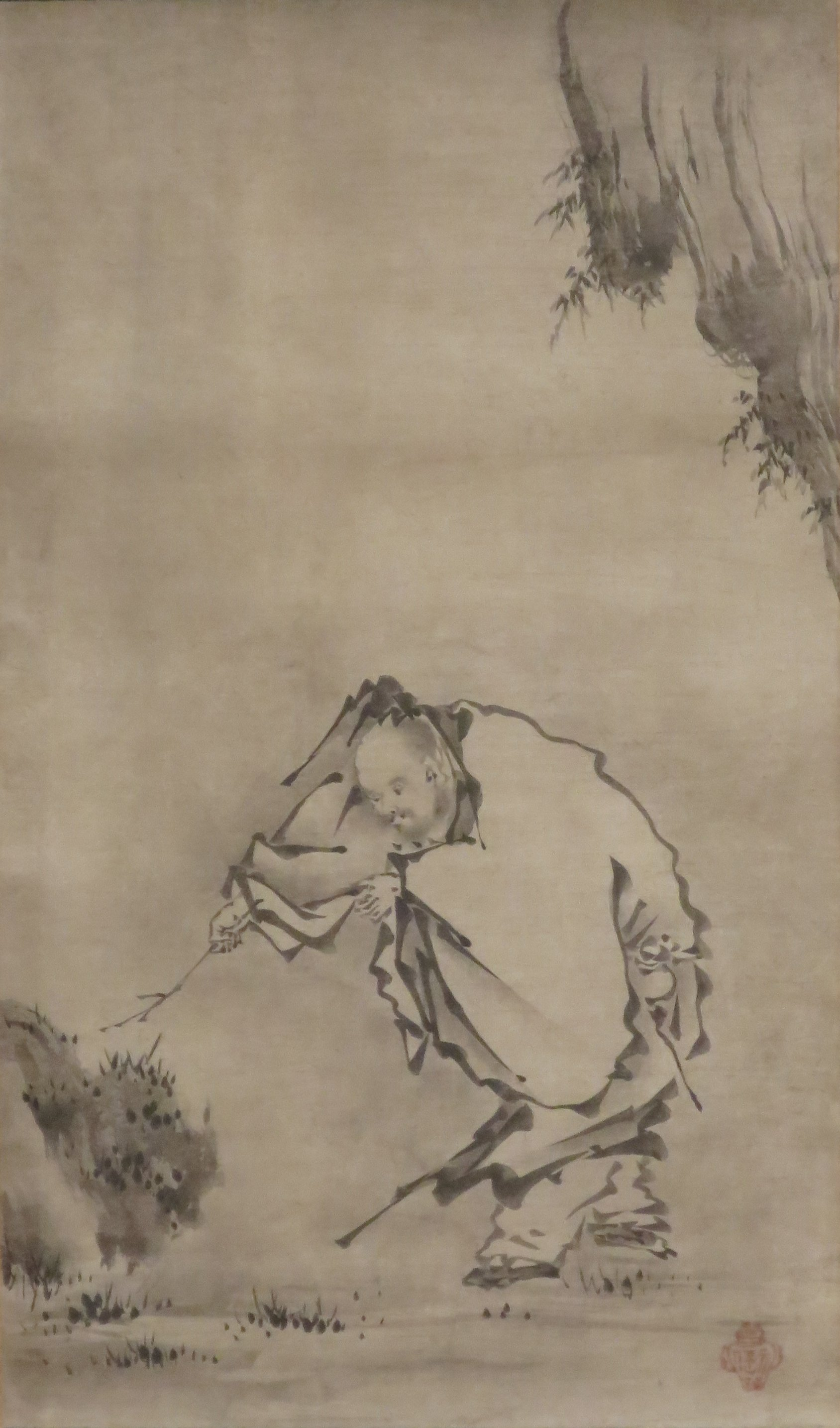
The Daoist Immortal Huang Chuping, 16th century, ink on paper, Honolulu Museum of Art.

== Legacy ==
One of Motonobu's greatest achievements was the creation of a new technique for painting. This technique formed the basis for the early Kanō school style. It was known as wa-kan, a mixture of Japanese and Chinese painting. This combination had the spatial solidity and careful brushwork techniques of Kanga. It also had some of the characteristics of Yamato-e style, for instance, the fine line and decorative patterning, use of colors, and gold leaf. The wall panels depicting Birds and Flowers of the Four Seasons shows this combination of styles.

He taught other generations everything he learned. This established some creativity and flexibility in the Kanō school. The Story of Xiang yan (Tokyo National Museum) shows the emergence of Kanō style, although it has an underlying Chinese philosophy to it. But the figure in the foreground is active and the vertical plane makes the painting Japanese. The brushwork and compositional elements also make the painting appear distinctively Japanese.

The Kanō school flourished because of leaders like Motonobu. His reputation, talent and developed organizational skills made this possible. Though the school was founded in the 15th century, its impact can still be felt in modern art across the world.

== Works ==
- Kurama-dera engi (‘Origins of Kurama temple’; Zen Patriarchs), 1513. Separated and distributed into hanging scrolls, ink and color on paper, 175.1 x 88.4 cm. Tokyo National Museum, Tokyo, Japan. https://mdid3.uwsp.edu/data/record/10512/2015_00571jpg/
- Em-a Thirty Six Immortal Poets, 1515. Hanging Scroll ink on paper. Shinto shrine of Itsukushima.
- The Four Accomplishments, mid-16th century. Pair of six-panel folding screens; ink and color on paper. https://www.metmuseum.org/art/collection/search/44673
- Bo Ya Plays the Qin as Zhong Ziqi Listens, 1530s. Hanging scroll, ink on paper, Image: 65 1/16 × 34 1/4 in. (165.2 × 87 cm) Overall with mounting: 8 ft. 10 7/8 in. × 40 13/16 in. (271.5 × 103.7 cm) Overall with knobs: 8 ft. 10 7/8 in. × 43 3/16 in. (271.5 × 109.7 cm). https://www.metmuseum.org/art/collection/search/53233
- Bamboo Stalks, Rocks and Cranes, 15th century. Ink on paper. https://www.japantimes.co.jp/culture/2017/10/24/arts/motonobu-father-kano-styles/#.Woc1ZZM-cWo
- White-robed Bodhisattva of Compassion, Early 16th century. Hanging scroll, ink and color on paper, Image: 157.2 x 76.4 cm (61 7/8 x 30 1/16 in.) Mount (with jiku): 256.5 x 104.1 cm (101 x 41 in.). Museum of Fine Arts Boston, Fenollosa-Weld Collection. http://www.mfa.org/collections/object/white-robed-bodhisattva-of-compassion-24752
- 49 Landscapes with Flowers and Birds, Early 16th century. Hanging Scroll, mounted ink and color on paper, Kyoto Shinto Shrine.
- Hosokawa Sumimoto on Horseback, 1507. Hanging Scroll, ink and color on paper. Eisei Bunko Museum.
- Portrait of Hosokawa Takakuni, 1543. Hanging Scroll, ink and color on paper. Tōrin-in.
- Mountain and Water, Hanging Scroll, ink and color on paper. Tokyo National Museum.
- Shuten Dōji emaki (Picture Scrolls of Shuten Dōji), Early 16th century. Set of three hand scrolls, colour on paper, Vol. 1: H. 33.0, W. 1751.7/ Vol. 2: H. 33.0, W. 2100.0/ Vol. 3: H. 33.0, W. 2788.9. Suntory Art Museum, Tokyo, Japan. https://www.suntory.com/sma/collection/gallery/detail?lang=en&id=626
