= Ōuchi Yoshioki =

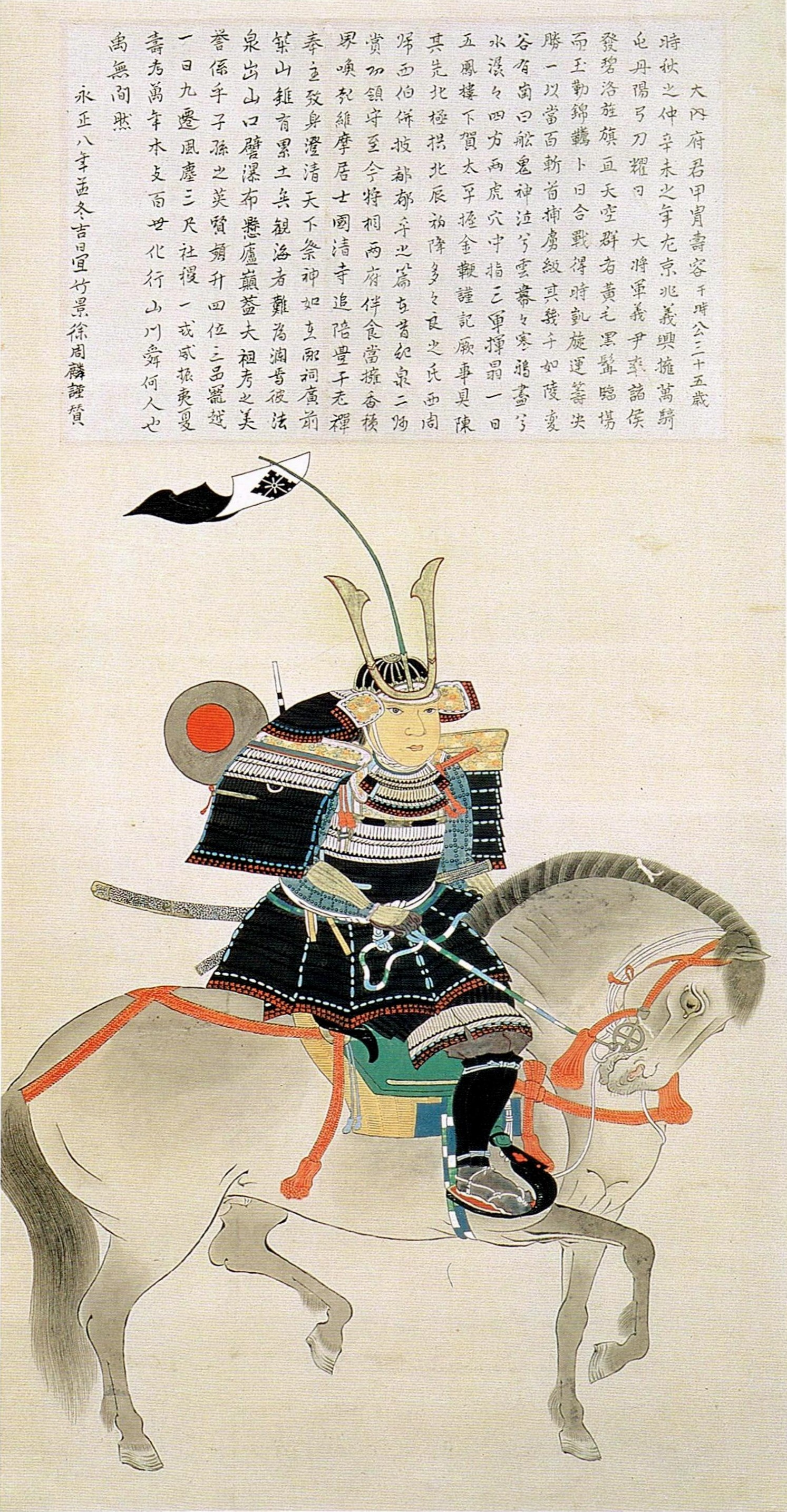
- Ōuchi Yoshioki on horseback, at Yamaguchi Prefectural Museum
- Born: April 7, 1477
- Died: January 29, 1529 (aged 51)

Ōuchi Yoshioki (大内 義興; April 7, 1477 – January 29, 1529) became a sengoku daimyō of Suō Province and served as the 15th head of the Ōuchi clan. Yoshioki was born early in the Sengoku period, the son of Ōuchi Masahiro, shugo of Suō Province and the 14th head of the Ōuchi clan. The first character in Yoshioki's name originated from Ashikaga Yoshihisa, the ninth shōgun in the Muromachi bakufu. In 1492, Masahiro ordered Yoshioki to join the battle against Rokkaku Takayori, a sengoku daimyō from southern Ōmi Province. In the midst of this engagement in 1493, an incident known as the Meiō no seihen occurred, by which Hosokawa Masamoto, a kanrei, or deputy, held the shōgun, Ashikaga Yoshiki, in confinement. Yoshioki withdrew his men from the battle to Hyōgo in Settsu Province to wait for the outcome of the event, which resulted in Yoshiki being deposed and replaced by Ashikaga Yoshizumi. Yoshioki's younger sister was abducted while staying in Kyōto in an area under the control of Takeda Motonobu, an ally of Hosokawa Masamoto. Masamoto took her hostage as leverage against Masahiro in his support for Yoshiki. Masahiro then ordered close associates of Yoshioki to commit seppuku. This may have been as retribution for what he viewed as Yoshioki's tepid response to the pressure exerted upon him by Masamoto and his retainers. Nevertheless, Yoshioki's decision to withdraw his forces was well-received by the hikan, or administrators, in his birthplace of Kyōto, building relationships that benefit him later at the time of his succession to Masahiro.

When Masahiro became ill In the autumn of 1494, Yoshioki was nominally appointed his successor. In 1495, he formally became the 15th head of the clan after the death of his father. The Ōuchi clan, however, continued to experience discord during this period. First, a retainer named Sue Takemori, who had suddenly absconded from Kyōto to the Tennō Temple in Settsu Province, returned home and killed his younger brother, Sue Okiakira, who had become head of the family in his absence. Takemori himself had earlier taken over the clan after his father, Sue Hiromori, was assassinated in 1482 by Yoshimi Nobuyori while attending a celebration at the Tsukiyama residence hosted by Masahiro. Takemori falsely claimed to Yoshioki that Naitō Hironori, shugodai of Nagato Province, sought to support his younger brother. Yoshioki then directed his men toward Hōfu, proceeding to execute Hironori and his son, Hirokazu. Later, upon learning of the injustice committed against Hironori and Hirokazu, Yoshioki executed Takemori and received Hironori's daughter as his formal wife. Further, he supported Hironori's younger brother, Naitō Hiroharu, to reconstitute the Naitō clan, while enabling Sue Okifusa, the youngest member of the Sue clan, to lead the Sue. In 1499, Sugi Takeakira, a senior retainer, colluded with a daimyō from Bungo Province named Ōtomo Chikaharu in an effort to seize control of the Ōuchi clan. The plot was to abandon Yoshioki in favor of his younger brother, Ōuchi Takahiro. Upon learning of the plot, Yoshioki compelled Takeakira to commit seppuku, while Takahiro narrowly escaped to the protection of the Ōtomo clan in Bungo.

== Advances into Kyūshū and exile of Ashikaga Yoshitada – the former shōgun ==
Over a long period, the Ōuchi clan battled against the Ōtomo and Shōni clans of Kyūshū to expand their influence. Ōtomo Masachika wed the younger sister of Ōuchi Masahiro to form a political alliance, and her son, Ōtomo Yoshisuke, inherited the clan. As cousins, Yoshisuke cooperated with Yoshioki, leading to a stable relationship. When Yoshisuke suddenly died in 1496, a rumor circulated that his father, Masachika, had poisoned him. Having reacquired control of the clan, Masachika ordered his men to attack the Ōuchi territory in northern Kyūshū. While en route, the boat that Masachika rode in came under distress, eventually reaching shore in the Ōuchi's main territory of Nagato Province. Yoshioki captured his father and had him commit seppuku, most likely as retribution for the alleged poisoning of Yoshisuke. During this turn of events, Hosokawa Masamoto operated behind the scenes, fearing the expansion of the Ōuchi influence and their connection to the deposed shōgun, Ashikaga Yoshitada (formerly under the name Yoshiki), who lived in exile in the northern provinces. Thereafter, Yoshioki supported Ōtomo Chikazane, son of Ōtomo Chikatsuna, to become leader of the Ōtomo clan, but this failed owing to the opposition of Masachika's younger brother, Ōtomo Chikaharu. Moreover, Yoshioki's younger brother, Takahiro, who had failed in his earlier rebellion, was under Chikaharu's protection while in exile. Takahiro received one of the characters in his name from Ashikaga Yoshizumi, the shōgun, who was earlier called Yoshitaka. Yoshioki's support for Yoshitada placed him in opposition to Masamoto, who backed Yoshizumi as the shōgun.

Aiming to expand their domain, Shōni Masasuke, and his son, Takatsune, joined forces with Ōtomo Masachika and his brother, Chikaharu, to attack the Ōuchi by advancing from Hizen Province into Chikuzen Province. Late in 1496, Yoshioki responded by gathering men in Akamagaseki in Nagato, from which the army headed toward Chikuzen. In the spring of 1497, Yoshioki's men defeated the Shōni in battles in front of the Shōfuku Temple in Hakata and at Takatorii Castle, forging onward to Hizen. The forces attacked Asahi Castle, and then surrounded Masasuke at Ogi Castle. Upon returning to his hometown of Yamaguchi, Yoshioki paid a series of visits to local shrines, including Tamano-oya, Izumodai, Nikabe, Akada, and Asada. Several days later, Ogi Castle fell and Masasuke fled but then killed himself.

In 1498, Shibukawa Tadashige, the shugo of Hizen Province stationed in Kyūshū by the Muromachi bakufu, was attacked by the Shōni at Ayabe Castle in Hizen. Yoshioki responded by dispatching Niho Gokyō to support the defenders, and these forces prevailed in clashes in the Kii, Yabu, and Mine districts, enabling Yoshioki to expand his influence in Hizen. Masasuke and Takatsune were slayed by the sword. Meanwhile, Yoshioki found his men engaged in defensive battles against the Ōtomo. Yoshioki sent Migita Hirokazu and Suetake Nagayasu to Bungo Province, whereupon Nagayasu sustained wounds and Hirokazu died in battle in the Kusu District.

In 1500, Ashikaga Yoshitada, the deposed shōgun, sought protection from Yoshioki in Yamaguchi, a metropolis with a population of approximately 40,000 citizens. Although in exile, Yoshitada insisted that he remained the legitimate shōgun, establishing a self-styled form of the bakufu in Yamaguchi. Yoshioki continued his opposition to Hosokawa Masamoto by supporting Yoshitada's plan to march upon the capital of Kyōto. In response, Masamoto, together with Ashikaga Yoshitaka, ordered Ōtomo Chikaharu, Ōuchi Takahiro, Shōni Sukemoto (the third son of Masasuke), Kikuchi Takeyuki, and Aso Korenaga to attack Yoshioki, and obtained a written edict from Emperor Gokashiwabara to defeat Yoshioki. This made Yoshioki an enemy of the Court, whereupon directives were sent out by Yoshitaka, the shōgun, and his bugyōnin to a total of twenty-eight daimyō and powerful kokujin in the western provinces. In 1501, forces under the command of Ōtomo Chikaharu and Shōni Sukemoto attacked the stronghold of Umagatake Castle in Buzen Province. Niho Gokyō led the defense but died in action while the castle fell to the attackers. The following month, support troops re-took the castle. To the east, Yoshioki succeeded in drawing Mōri Hiromoto from Aki Province to his side despite Hiromoto having received orders to oppose Yoshiaki. Eventually, Yoshioki reached a settlement with Ōtomo Chikaharu through the offices of Ashikaga Yoshitada, followed by peace with the Shōni, allowing Yoshioki to maintain his influence in northern Kyūshū.

== Aiming for the Capital ==
In 1504, Yoshioki imposed a provisional tax in his territory to generate funds needed for his plans to march upon Kyōto under the pretext of reinstalling Ashikaga Yoshitada. In 1507, Hosokawa Masamoto, the primary benefactor of Ashikaga Yoshizumi and chief governor of the bakufu, was assassinated as a result of an internal struggle for succession in the clan known as the Eishō sakuran. The slaying did not bring an end to discord in the Hosokawa clan. Yoshioki took advantage of the situation by ordering daimyō from Kyūshū and the western provinces to mobilize for a march upon Kyōto to reinstall Yoshitada as the shōgun. Yoshioki ordered Migita Hiroaki and others to protect the home provinces, while he departed Yamaguchi for Hōfu, advancing to Bingo Province. Hosokawa Takakuni, the adopted son of Masamoto, colluded with Yoshioki and opposed Hosokawa Sumimoto, another adopted son of Masamoto. Under pressure from Takakuni and Yoshioki, in 1508, Sumimoto fled together with Ashikaga Yoshizumi, the shōgun, to Ōmi Province.

Pledging support for Yoshitane, Yoshioki entered the town of Sakai in Izumi Province and strengthened his ties to Hosokawa Takakuni in their mutual effort to pacify followers of Sumimoto in the Kinai Region. Yoshitada then sent an edict declaring Takakuni as the head of the Keichō branch of the Hosokawa clan, after which Yoshitada and Yoshioki realized their goal to march upon Kyōto. In the summer of 1508, Yoshitada was reinstalled as shōgun while Yoshioki served as a kanreidai, or vice-deputy, along with Takakuni to govern the affairs of the bakufu. For his military contributions, Yoshitada offered Yoshioki control over the southern half of Sakai, including the area around the Shōkoku Temple, but Yoshioki refused. As a reflection of the goodwill that Yoshitada held toward Yoshioki, he then offered Yoshioki the title of shugo of Yamashiro Province and publicly declared that the temples, shrines, and kuge, or court nobles, in Kyōto and Nara would be under his domain.

Although Yoshoiki had achieved his goal to reinstall Yoshitada and exert control in Kyōto, an unstable situation beckoned him to return to his home provinces of Nagato and Suō, but ongoing clashes with rivals including Hosokawa Sumimoto and Miyoshi Yukinaga who aspired to reclaim Kyōto prevented him from leaving the capital. Toward the end of 1508, the Tōdai Temple in Nara, requested return of the provincial governorate in Suō Province which had been under Ōuchi control since 1490, and closed their doors. As an outcome of the earlier proclamation regarding Yoshioki's governance of the southern half of Sakai and the temples and shrines in Kyōto and Nara, Yoshioki confronted a series of requests from representatives of the Court and the bakufu to return the provincial governorate to the Tōdai Temple in order to prevent its closing. While leaders of the Tōdai Temple appealed for support from the Kōfuku and other temples of local influence, the Tōdai Temple became isolated in its bid after the others refused support out of fear that Yoshioki would abandon the policy to protect the temples and shrines under his domain. In 1509, Yoshioki brought the situation under control by declaring that the provincial governorate would be returned to the Tōdai Temple.

Conflict between Yoshioki and his rivals came to a head at the Battle of Nyoigatake on a summer night in 1509, when Yoshioki joined with Hosokawa Takakuni to defeat Sumimoto and Yukinaga in a large-scale battle. After Sumimoto and his supporters fled to their base in Awa Province in Shikoku, in 1510, Yoshioki and Takakuni invaded Ōmi Province, but lost overwhelmingly to kokukjin who backed Sumimoto. This encouraged supporters of Ashikaga Yoshizumi to plan for a final showdown by invading Settsu Province in the summer of 1511. The ensuing Battle of Ashiyagawara occurred near Takao Castle. Takakuni ordered his retainer, Kawarabayashi Masayori, to construct the castle to serve as a forward operating base intended to thwart the advance of Sumimoto from Awa Province into the Kinai Region and, in particular, the capital of Kyōto. Sumimoto called upon forces from Shikoku under the command of Hosokawa Masakata and Hosokawa Mototsune to augment the army under Hosokawa Hisaharu, shugo of Awaji Province. Meanwhile, Takakuni ordered the mobilization of powerful kokujin from Settsu Province, including retainers of the Ikeda, Itami, Miyake, Ibaraki, Fukui, Ōta, Irie, and Takase clans. The contingent totaled as many as 20,000 men but lost an initial clash at Fukai Castle in Izumi Province. When Masayori reported to Takakuni that the invading forces had made landfall in Hyōgo under the command of Hisaharu, Takakuni dispatched a unit of over thirty elite cavalry, including Hatano Tanemichi, together with 3000 soldiers. This led to a fierce clash against the defenders in Takao Castle and in the environs of the Ashiya River. Sumimoto drew further support from Akamatsu Yoshimura, shugo of neighboring Harima Province and Hosokawa Yukimochi, his older brother and shugo of Awa Province, ultimately ending in a loss for Takakuni after Masayori abandoned Takao Castle and fled at night to Itami Castle in Tanba Province. Within days after the end of the Battle of Ashiyagawara, Ashikaga Yoshizumi suddenly died, and Yoshioki recaptured control of Kyōto after his forces defeated Sumimoto's men in the Battle of Funaokayama Castle. Prior to retreating to Suō Province, Yoshioki ordered Tagaya Takeshige to firmly protect Sakai, which had the additional consequence of blocking the passage of forces from Shikoku to support Sumimoto.

In 1512, Yoshioki was promoted from the rank of jusanmi, or second grade of the third rank of honor, to kugyō - a high-ranking court noble. Emperor Gokashiwabara made this decision over the intentions of Ashikaga Yoshitada, the shōgun, whereby Yoshitada acknowledged that he must honor the wishes of the Emperor. He then had his daughter wed Ashikaga Yoshitsuna, the second son of Yoshizumi.

== Competition for the rights to the China trade ==
In 1516, the shōgun and his bugyō, or administrators, issued declarations granting perpetual, exclusive rights to the Ōuchi clan to manage trade with the Ming Dynasty of China. Prior to this award, the Hosokawa from Sakai and the Ōuchi from Hakata conducted trade on an independent basis with China, and competed with one another for a license from the bakufu to officially recognize their trading rights with the Ming Dynasty. Much to the disdain of Hosokawa Takakuni, an exclusive grant of rights to the Ōuchi meant that Hakata would become the center of trade with China, resulting in a significant loss of revenue. Owing to the military support for the Ōuchi, Takakuni could not overturn the declaration. However, in 1519, after Yoshioki returned to Yamaguchi, Takakuni made plans to change the situation. In 1523, Yoshioki dispatched Kendō Sōsetsu as his emissary to China. Meanwhile, Takakuni sent Rankō Zuisa as his chief emissary and Song Suqing as the vice-emissary. He furnished them with an expired seal from the Hongzhi emperor, and had them take a southern sea route. To the disadvantage of the Hosokawa, the ship for the Ōuchi arrived first in Ningbo harbor, but Sokei bribed the customs office at the harbor to have their ship inspected first. In an incident known as the Ningbo incident, the Ōuchi responded by attacking and torching the Hosokawa vessel. The Ōuchi also directed their wrath toward the Chinese authorities for having favored the Hosokawa. In this conflict, Kendō Sōsetsu killed Rankō Zuisa. Song Suqing and the Chinese harbor officials fled to Shaoxing.

Gradually, Ashikaga Yoshitane (having changed his name from Yoshitada following his return as shōgun) had a falling out with Takakuni, while kokujin from Iwami and Aki provinces who could no longer endure their extended stays in Kyōto began to depart on their own accord. Amago Tsunehisa from Izumo Province saw this as an opportunity to commence an invasion. In order to strike against members of the Amago residing in the capital, Yoshioki became the shugo of Iwami in 1517, and banded together with wealthy families from Iwami Province, including the Masuda and Kikkawa clans. Nevertheless, unable to halt the expanding influence of the Amago, in 1518, Yoshioki resigned his official post as kanreidai and left Sakai to return to Yamaguchi.

== Contests in the Western provinces ==
After returning home, Yoshioki focused on battles against warriors from Aki Province who rebelled while he was in Kyōto, including Takeda Motoshige and his son, Takeda Mitsukazu, along with Tomoda Okifuji, lord of Itsukushima Castle. In 1523, Amago Tsunehisa aimed to enter Aki, and through collaboration with the Takeda and Tomoda, launched an invasion into the Ōuchi territory. The Amago forces attacked Hashiura in Iwami, and the Mōri clan of Aki betrayed the Ōuchi in favor of the Amago. Tsunehisa leveraged Mōri Motonari to have him attack Kagamiyama Castle, the economic center of the Ōuchi in Aki, which caught the Ōuchi off guard. Motonari had earlier served as custodian for Mōri Kōmatsumaru, head of the Mōri clan. Yoshioki responded by dispatching troops to Aki and Iwami provinces. Despite engaging in a protracted conflict with the Amago, Yoshioki could not achieve victory. In 1524, the Ōuchi attacked Sakurao Castle, a bastion of the Tomoda clan located in Itsukushima in Aki Province, and defeated the Amago army in battle at Satōkanayama Castle. In 1525, Motonari cut ties with the Amago clan and aligned with the Ōuchi, enabling the Ōuchi to recover some of their influence in Aki. Meanwhile, the Amago battled against the Yamana clan which controlled the eastern portions of the Sanyō Region, allowing Yoshioki to recapture control of Iwami. The Ōuchi made progress in an ongoing conflict with Shōni Sukemoto in northern Kyūshū. Yamana Nobutoyo, shugo of Bingo Province, lost control after enduring attacks from Tsunehisa from the north and Sue Okifusa from the west under orders from Yoshioki. As a result, Bingo became the stage for conflict between the Amago and Ōuchi. In 1527, Okifusa defeated Tsunehisa at the Battle of Hosozawayama, while Nobutoyo and Yamauchi Naomichi continued resistance against the Amago. In 1528, Yoshioki fell ill during preparation for the assault on Kadoyama Castle in Aki, and died at the age of fifty-two soon after returning to Yamaguchi. Yoshioki's eldest son, Yoshitaka, inherited his position as head of the clan.
