= Bunki =

Period of Japanese history (1501–1504)

Bunki (文亀) was a Japanese era name (年号, nengō; "year name") after Meiō and before Eishō. This period spanned the years from February 1501 through February 1504. The reigning emperor was Go-Kashiwabara-tennō (後柏原天皇).

== Change of era ==
- 1501 Bunki gannen (文亀元年): The era name was changed to mark the anniversary of the enthronement of Go-Kashiwabara and the 58th year of the Chinese zodiac. The previous era ended and a new one commenced in 1501 (Meiō 10, 29th day of the 2nd month).

== Events of the Bunki era ==
- 1501 (Bunki 1): The former shōgun Yoshimura was exiled. He retired to Suō Province, and he lived in exile in the home of the daimyō of that han. He changed his name to Ashikaga Yoshitane; and he summoned all the military forces of the western empire to come to his aid. Hosokawa Masamoto was made master of all the provinces which encircled the Kinai.
- 1502 (Bunki 2, 7th month): Minamoto no Yoshitaka was elevated to the 2nd tier of the 4th class kuge officials, and he expressed thanks to the emperor for that honor. In the same month, the name of Ashikaga Yoshitaka was changed to that of Yoshizumi.
- 1503 (Bunki 3): There was a great drought in the summer of this year.

== Notes ==
Preceded by Meiō	Era or nengō Bunki; 1501–1504	Succeeded by Eishō
