= Ashikaga Yoshitsuna =

Ashikaga Yoshitsuna (足利義維; 1509–1573) was a Japanese samurai of the Ashikaga clan during the Sengoku period of Japan's history.

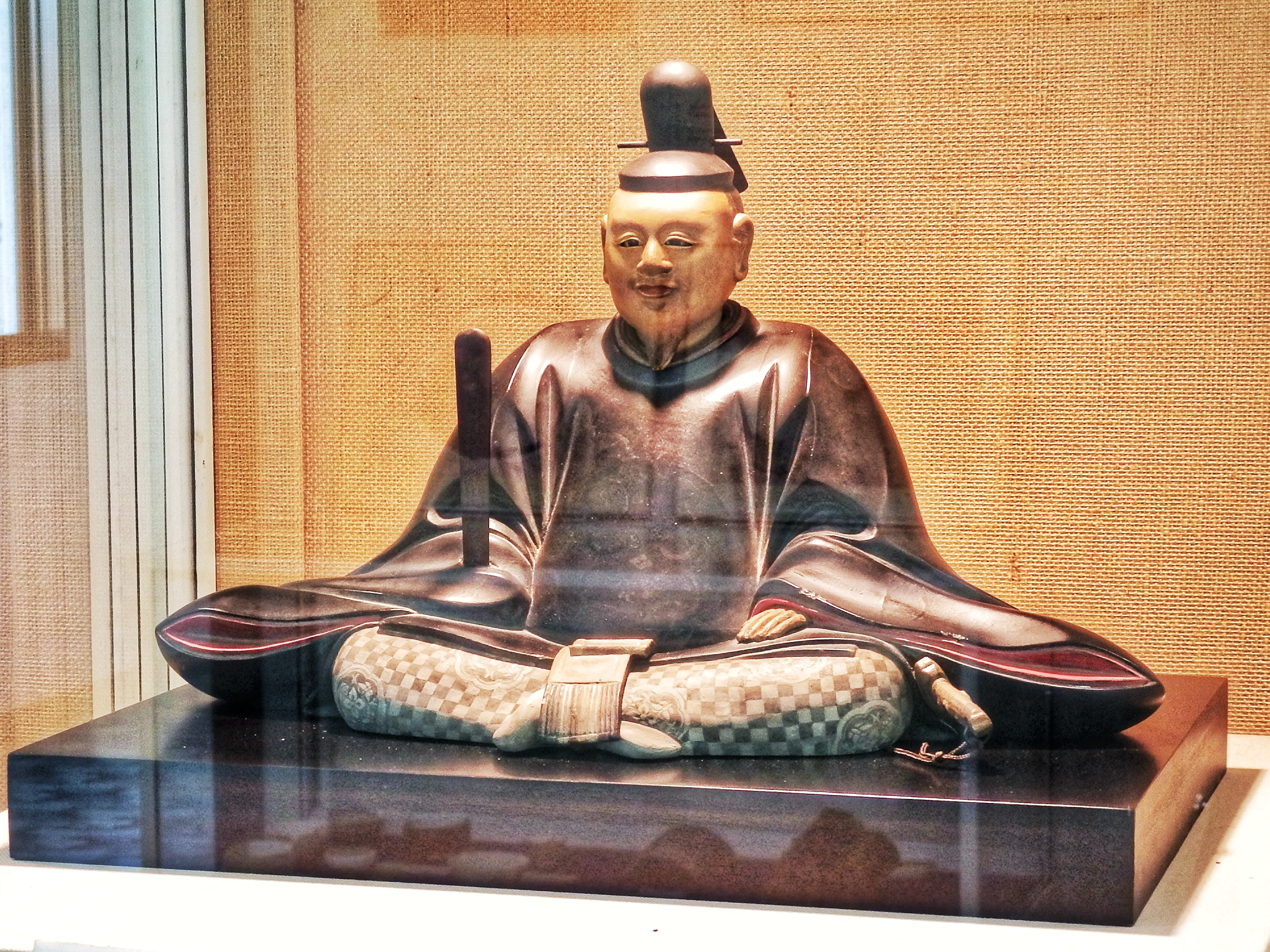
Seated figure of Ashikaga Yoshitsuna

Yoshitsuna was the brother of Ashikaga Yoshiharu who was the 12th shōgun of the Muromachi shogunate. Both men were sons of Ashikaga Yoshizumi, who was the 11th Ashikaga shōgun.

Yoshitsuna was adopted as heir of the 10th shōgun, Ashikaga Yoshitane, but he was never elevated to this leadership role.

Yoshitsuna was the father of the 14th shōgun, Ashikaga Yoshihide.
