= Motoichi =

- Gender: Male

Origin
- Origin: Japanese
- Meaning: Different meanings depending on the kanji used

Motoichi (written: 元一) is a masculine Japanese given name. Notable people with the name include:

- Motoichi Kumagai (熊谷 元一; 1909–2010), Japanese photographer and illustrator
- Yakushiji Motoichi (薬師寺 元一; 1475–1504), Japanese samurai
