= Emperor Go-Nara =

Emperor of Japan from 1526 to 1557

Emperor Go-Nara 後奈良天皇
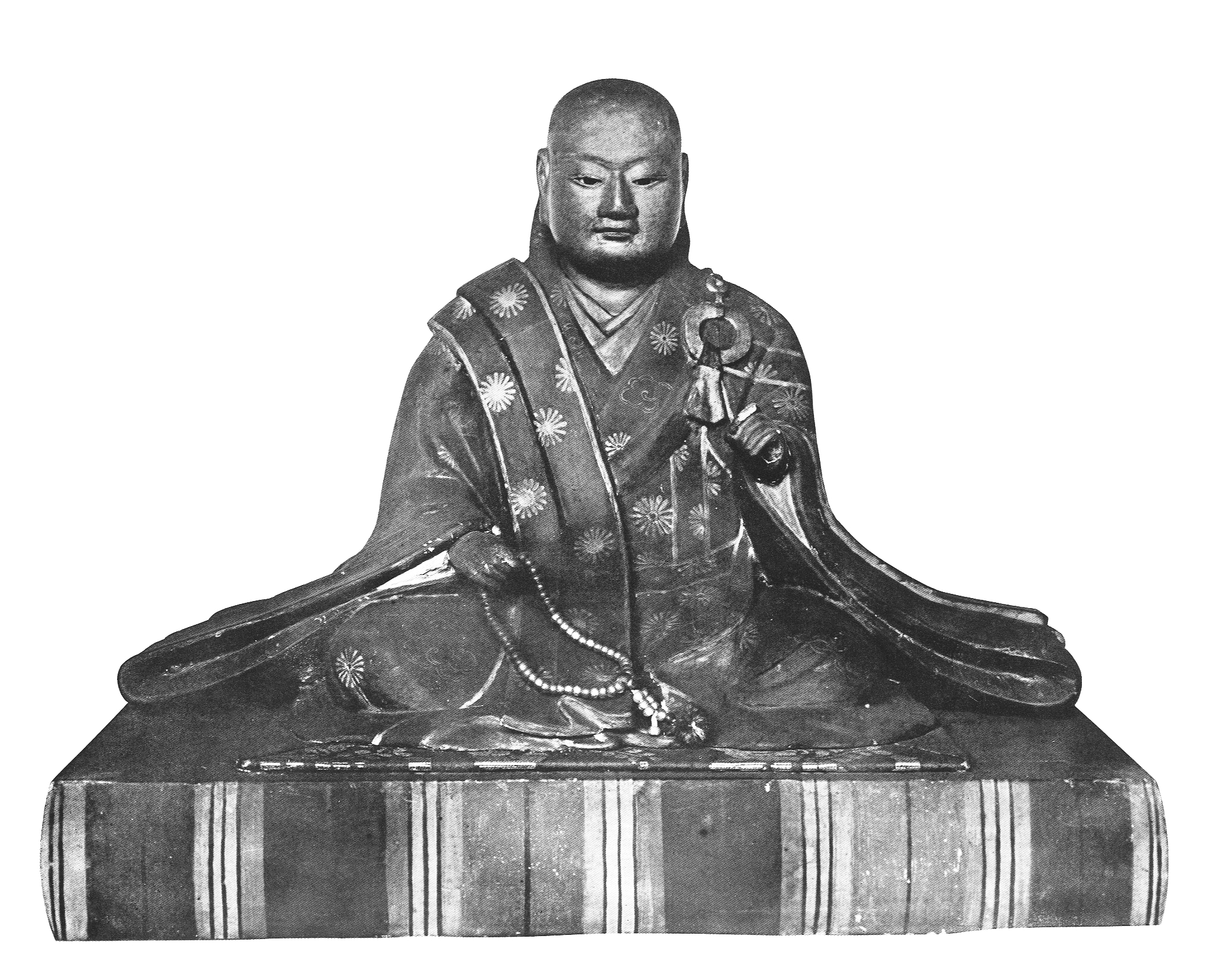

Emperor of Japan
- Reign: June 9, 1526 – September 27, 1557
- Enthronement: March 29, 1535
- Predecessor: Go-Kashiwabara
- Successor: Ōgimachi
- Shōguns: See list: Ashikaga Yoshiharu; Ashikaga Yoshiteru
- Born: Tomohito (知仁); January 26, 1495
- Died: 27 September 1557 (aged 62)
- Burial: Fukakusa no kita no misasagi (深草北陵) Kyoto
- Issue among others...: Emperor Ōgimachi
Posthumous name
- Tsuigō: Emperor Go-Nara (後奈良院 or 後奈良天皇)
- House: Imperial House of Japan
- Father: Emperor Go-Kashiwabara
- Mother: Fujiwara Fujiko

Emperor Go-Nara (後奈良天皇, Go-Nara-tennō; January 26, 1495 – September 27, 1557) was the 105th Emperor of Japan, according to the traditional order of succession. He reigned from June 9, 1526, until his death in 1557, during the Sengoku period of the Muromachi Bakufu. His personal name was Tomohito (知仁).

== Genealogy ==
He was the second son of Emperor Go-Kashiwabara. His mother was Fujiwara Fujiko (藤原藤子)

- Nyōin: Madenokōji (Fujiwara) Eiko (万里小路栄子; 1499–1522), Madenokōji Katafusa's daughter
  - First daughter: (1514–1515)
  - First son: Imperial Prince Michihito (方仁親王) later Emperor Ōgimachi
  - Second daughter: Princess Eiju (1519–1535; 永寿女王)
  - Second Son: (1521–1530)
- Lady-in-waiting: Takakura (Fujiwara) Kazuko? (高倉（藤原）量子), Tachibana Yukio's daughter
  - Fifth daughter: Princess Fukō? (d.1579; 普光女王)
- Lady-in-waiting: Hirohashi (Fujiwara) Kuniko? (広橋(藤原)国子), Hirohashi Kanehide's daughter
  - Seventh daughter: Princess Seishū (1552–1623; 聖秀女王)
- Naishi: Fujiwara (Hino) Tomoko, Minase Hidekane's daughter
- Court lady: Iyo-no-Tsubone (伊予局), Mibu Harutomi's Daughter
  - Third son: kakujyo (1521–1574; 覚恕)
- Court lady: Daughter of Jimyoin Motoharu
  - Princess (Twins, 1520)
  - Princess (Twins, 1520)
- Court lady: Daughter of Imperial Prince Tokiwai Tsunenao

== Events of Go-Nara's life ==
- Daiei 6, in the 4th month (June 9, 1526): Go-Nara was proclaimed emperor upon the death of his father, Emperor Go-Kashiwabara. He began his reign at age 31.
- Daiei 6, 7th month (1526): An army from Awa Province marched towards Miyako. Hosokawa Takakuni attacked these forces at the Katsura River, but his forces were unsuccessful. Hosokawa Takakage came to the aid of Takakuni, and their combined forces were successful in stopping the advancing army.
- Daiei 6, 12th month (1526): Shōgun Ashikaga Yoshiharu invited archers from neighboring provinces to come to the capital for an archery contest.
- Kyōroku gannen or Kyōroku 1 (1528): Former Kampuku Konoe Tanye became Sadaijin. The former Nadaijin Minamoto-no Mitsukoto became Udaijin. Former Dainagon Kiusho Tanemitsu became Nadaijin.
- Tenbun 4, 26th day of 2nd month (March 29, 1535): Go-Nara was formally installed as emperor. The Imperial Court was so impoverished, that a nationwide appeal for contributions went out. Contributions from the Hōjō clan, the Ōuchi clan, the Imagawa clan, and other great daimyō clans of the Sengoku period allowed the Emperor to carry out the formal coronation ceremonies ten years later. The Imperial Court's poverty was so extreme that the Emperor was forced to sell his calligraphy.
- Tenbun 11, 25th day of the 8th month (1543): Portuguese ship drifts ashore at Tanegashima, and European guns are introduced into Japan.
- Tenbun 20, 8th to 9th month (1551): Courtiers in preparation to move the emperor from war-torn Kyoto to the Ōuchi city of Yamaguchi were caught in the Tainei-ji incident, a coup within the Ōuchi clan. The massacre of the courtiers in Yamaguchi resulted in a widespread loss of court records along with knowledge of court rituals and imperial calendar-making. The emperor remained in Kyoto.
- Kōji 3, 5th day of 9th month (1557): Emperor Go-Nara died at age 62. He was unburied for 70 days.

Go-Nara is enshrined with other emperors at the imperial tomb called Fukakusa no kita no misasagi (深草北陵) in Fushimi-ku, Kyoto.

=== Kugyō ===
Kugyō (公卿) is a collective term for the very few most powerful men attached to the court of the Emperor of Japan in pre-Meiji eras. Even during those years in which the court's actual influence outside the palace walls was minimal, the hierarchic organization persisted.

In general, this elite group included only three to four men at a time. These were hereditary courtiers whose experience and background would have brought them to the pinnacle of a life's career. During Go-Nara's reign, this apex of the Daijō-kan included:

- Kampaku, Konoe Sakihisa, 1536–1612.
- Sadaijin
- Udaijin
- Nadaijin
- Dainagon

== Eras of Go-Nara's reign ==
The years of Go-Nara's reign are more specifically identified by more than one era name or nengō.

- Daiei (1521–1528)
- Kyōroku (1528–1532)
- Tenbun (1532–1555)
- Kōji (1555–1558)

== Ancestry ==
Ancestors of Emperor Go-Nara

8. Emperor Go-Hanazono (1419–1471)
4. Emperor Go-Tsuchimikado (1442–1500)
9. Ōinomikado Nobuko (1411–1488)
2. Emperor Go-Kashiwabara (1462–1526)
10. Niwata Nagakata (d. 1487)
5. Niwata Asako (1437–1492)
1. Emperor Go-Nara
12. Kajūji Tsuneoki (1396–1437)
6. Kajūji Norihide (1426–1496)
3. Kajūji Fujiko (1464–1535)
14. Asukai Masanaga
7. Asukai

== Notes ==
Japanese Imperial kamon — a stylized chrysanthemum blossom

== See also ==
- Imperial cult

Regnal titles
Preceded by Emperor Go-Kashiwabara	Emperor of Japan: Go-Nara; 1526–1557	Succeeded by Emperor Ōgimachi
