= Hosokawa Takakuni =

Japanese military commander

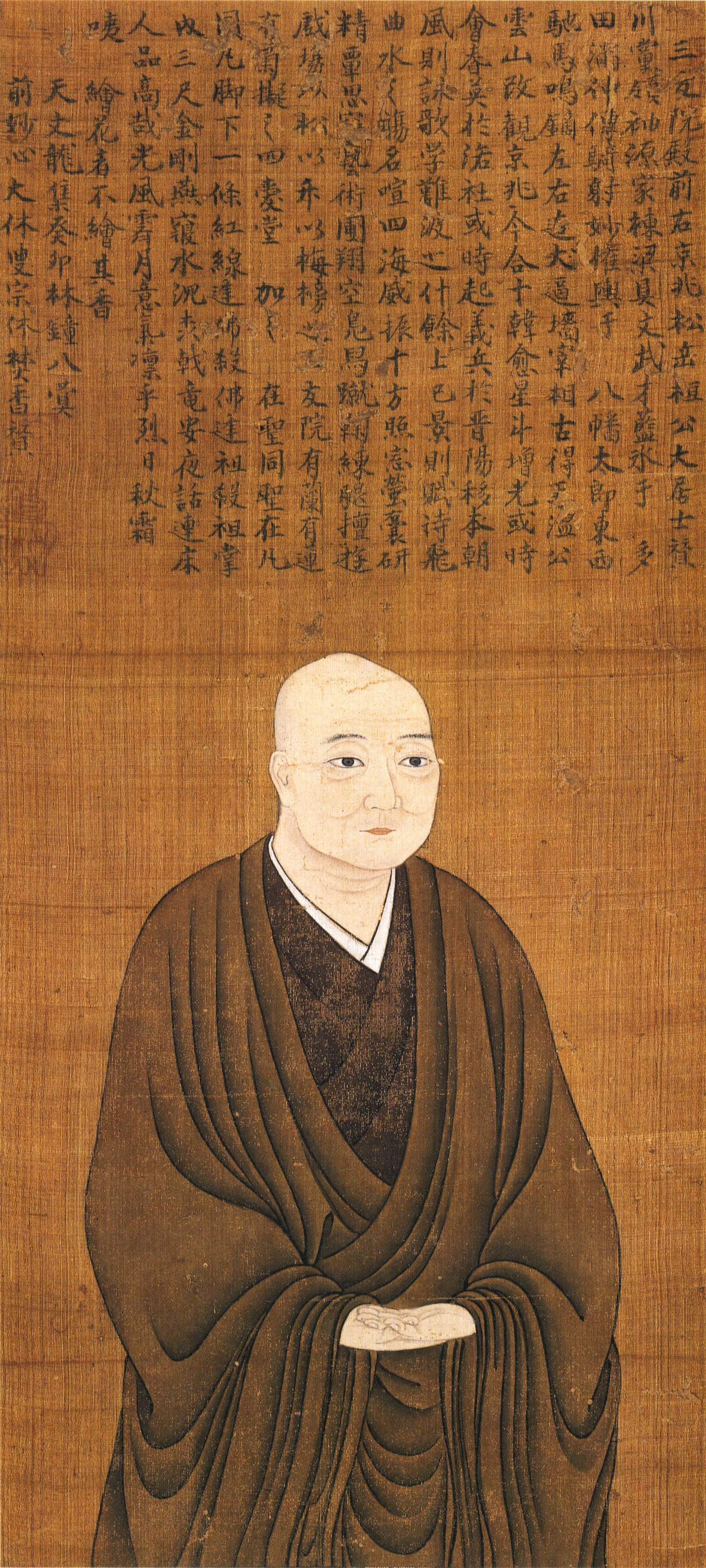
Hosokawa Takakuni

Hosokawa Takakuni (細川 高国, 1484 – 17 July 1531) was the most powerful military commander in the Muromachi period under Ashikaga Yoshiharu, the twelfth shōgun. His father was Hosokawa Masaharu, a member of the branch of the Hosokawa clan. His childhood name was Rokuro (六郎).

In 1507, Hosokawa Masamoto was killed by his foster son, Hosokawa Sumiyuki who had been disinherited by Masamoto. Takakuni supported Hosokawa Sumimoto and got credit for putting down Sumiyuki. Because of that, he got involved with the Muromachi shogunate. In 1508, when Ōuchi Yoshioki marched his armies into Kyoto with Ashikaga Yoshitane (the former shōgun who had escaped to Suō Province), Takakuni conspired with them and purged the shogun Ashikaga Yoshizumi and Sumimoto to Ōmi Province.

Takakuni and Yoshioki took hold of the Muromachi shogunate. Takakuni took over as head of the Hosokawa family and became Kanrei. In addition, he also held the post of shugo of Settsu Province, Tanba Province, Sanuki Province and Tosa Province. In 1518, he monopolized the powers of the shogunate after Yoshioki went back to his domain. In 1521, Yoshitane hated to be a puppet shogun, and escaped to Awa Province. Takakuni made Ashikaga Yoshiharu, son of Yoshizumi, take up the post of shogun.

Takakuni took Yanagimoto Kataharu, the younger brother of Kozai Motomori, chief vassal of the Hosokawa people, as his wakashū and the two swore eternal love to each other. Kataharu, even after reaching adulthood, remained a favorite vassal. However, as a result of a calumny by his own cousin, Takakuni felt obliged to have Motomori killed. Though initially appeased by his lord, Yanagimoto shortly after joined with another brother against the cousin to avenge Motomori's death.

In 1527, he was purged from Kyoto by Miyoshi Motonaga and Hosokawa Harumoto. In 1531, his army was defeated, and he hid in a store room for alcoholic beverage at Amagasaki, Settsu Province. When he was detected, he committed suicide.

== Family ==
- Father: Hosokawa Masaharu (1456–1518)
- Foster Father: Hosokawa Masamoto
- Wife: daughter of Hosokawa Masakata
- Children:
  - Hosokawa Tanekuni (1508–1525)
  - daughter married Kitabatake Harutomo
  - daughter married Yamana Toyosada
  - Hosokawa Takayori
  - Hosokawa Suminori
  - Ankokuji Shinkuno
