= Yoshizumi =

- Gender: Male

Origin
- Origin: Japanese
- Meaning: Different meanings depending on the kanji used

Yoshizumi (written: 良純, 宜純, 佳純, 義澄 or 義処) is a masculine Japanese given name. Notable people with the name include:

- Ashikaga Yoshizumi (足利 義澄; 1481–1511), Japanese shōgun
- Yoshizumi Ishihara (石原 良純; born 1962), Japanese weather forecaster, television personality and actor
- Yoshizumi Ishino (石野 良純; born 1959), Japanese molecular biologist
- Yoshizumi Ogawa (小川 佳純; born 1984), Japanese footballer
- Satake Yoshizumi (佐竹 義処; 1637–1703), Japanese daimyō
- Yoshizumi Takeda (竹田 宜純; born 1991), Japanese rugby union player

Yoshizumi (written: 吉住) is also a Japanese surname. Notable people with the surname include:

- Kenichi Yoshizumi (吉住 健一; born 1972), Japanese politician
- Kozue Yoshizumi (吉住 梢; born 1979), Japanese voice actress
- Wataru Yoshizumi (吉住 渉; born 1963), Japanese manga artist
