= Hosokawa Harumoto =

Japanese daimyō

- 細川 晴元
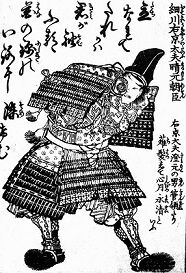
- Portrait of Hosokawa Harumoto
- Born: Hosokawa Harumoto; 1514
- Died: 24 March 1563 (aged 48–49)
- Other name: Sōmei-maru
- Occupation: Daimyō
- Years active: 1520–1561
- Relatives: Hosokawa Sumimoto (father); Seitai-in (mother)

Hosokawa Harumoto (細川 晴元; 1514 – March 24, 1563) was a Japanese daimyō of the Muromachi and Sengoku periods, and the head of the Hosokawa clan. Harumoto's childhood name was Sōmei-maru (聡明丸). He was born to Hosokawa Sumimoto, another renowned samurai of the Muromachi era.

== Early life ==
Harumoto succeeded to a house at the age of seven, after his father's death in 1520. While still a minor, he was supported by his caretaker Miyoshi Motonaga. His childhood name was Rokurō (六郎).

== Shogun Deputy (Kanrei) ==
In 1531, Harumoto defeated Hosokawa Takakuni, and regained the power. In addition, he feared Motonaga who had got credit and killed him next year.

After that, Harumoto ruled the whole area of Kinai (Yamashiro Province, Yamato Province, Kawachi Province, Izumi Province and Settsu Province) and took hold of the Ashikaga shogunate as the Kanrei.

In 1543, Hosokawa Ujitsuna who was the foster son of Takakuni, raised his armies, and in 1549, Miyoshi Nagayoshi who was a dominant retainer and the first son of Motonaga betrayed Harumoto and took side with Ujitsuna. Because of that, Harumoto was defeated. Harumoto, Ashikaga Yoshiteru who was the 13th Ashikaga shōgun and Ashikaga Yoshiharu who was the father of Yoshiteru were purged to Ōmi Province.

== Retirement ==
Harumoto and Yoshiteru had battled quite hard with Nagayoshi for the power of the Ashikaga shogunate. However, Harumoto was beaten, and he retired after he reconciled himself with Nagayoshi in 1561.

== Death ==
Harumoto died from a disease in 1563. The head family of the Hosokawa clan broke down as a result of his death.

== Family ==
- Father: Hosokawa Sumimoto
- Mother: Seitai-in
- Wives:
  - daughter of Sanjo Kin'yori
  - daughter of Rokkaku Sadayori
- Children:
  - Hosokawa Akimoto (1548–1615)
  - Hosokawa Haruyuki
  - daughter married Asakura Yoshikage
  - daughter married Inoo Sadamune
  - daughter married Daidoji Akiei
