= Ashikaga Yoshiharu =

Military ruler of Japan from 1521 to 1546

- 足利 義晴
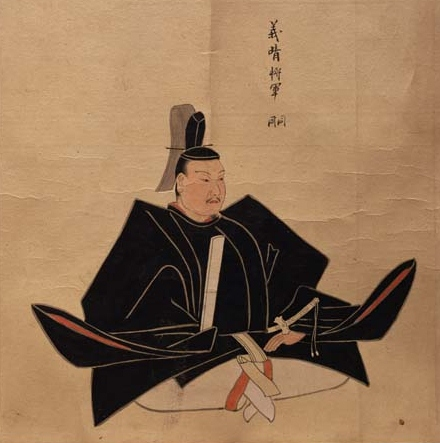

Shōgun
- In office 1521–1545
- Monarchs: Go-Kashiwabara; Go-Nara
- Preceded by: Ashikaga Yoshitane
- Succeeded by: Ashikaga Yoshiteru

Personal details
- Born: April 2, 1511
- Died: May 20, 1550 (aged 39)
- Spouse(s): Keiju-in, daughter of Konoe Hisamichi
- Children: Ashikaga Yoshiteru; Ashikaga Yoshiaki; Ashikaga Shūkō; Shiratori Yoshihisa; Rigen; Three daughters
- Parents: Ashikaga Yoshizumi (father); Hino Akiko (mother)
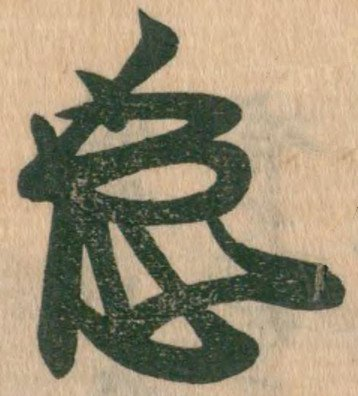
- Signature

Ashikaga Yoshiharu (足利 義晴; April 2, 1511 – May 20, 1550) was the twelfth shōgun of the Ashikaga shogunate from 1521 through 1546 during the late Muromachi period of Japan. He was the son of the eleventh shōgun Ashikaga Yoshizumi.

From a western perspective, Yoshiharu is significant, as he was shōgun when the first contact of Japan with the European West took place in 1543. A Portuguese ship, blown off its course to China, landed in Japan. In 1526, Yoshiharu invited archers from neighbouring provinces to come to the capital for an archery contest.

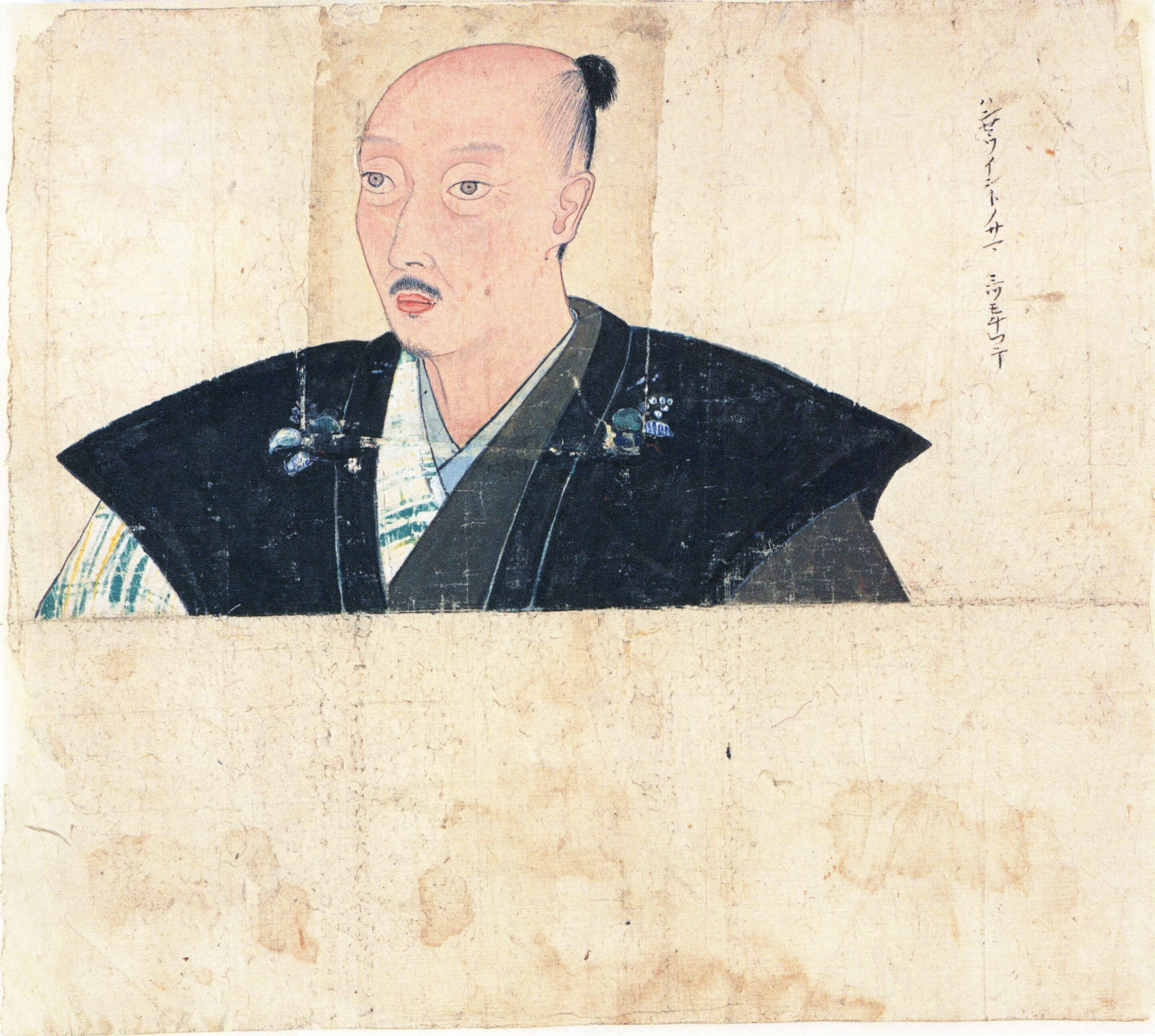
portrait of Ashikaga Yoshiharu by Tosa Mitsumochi in 1550.

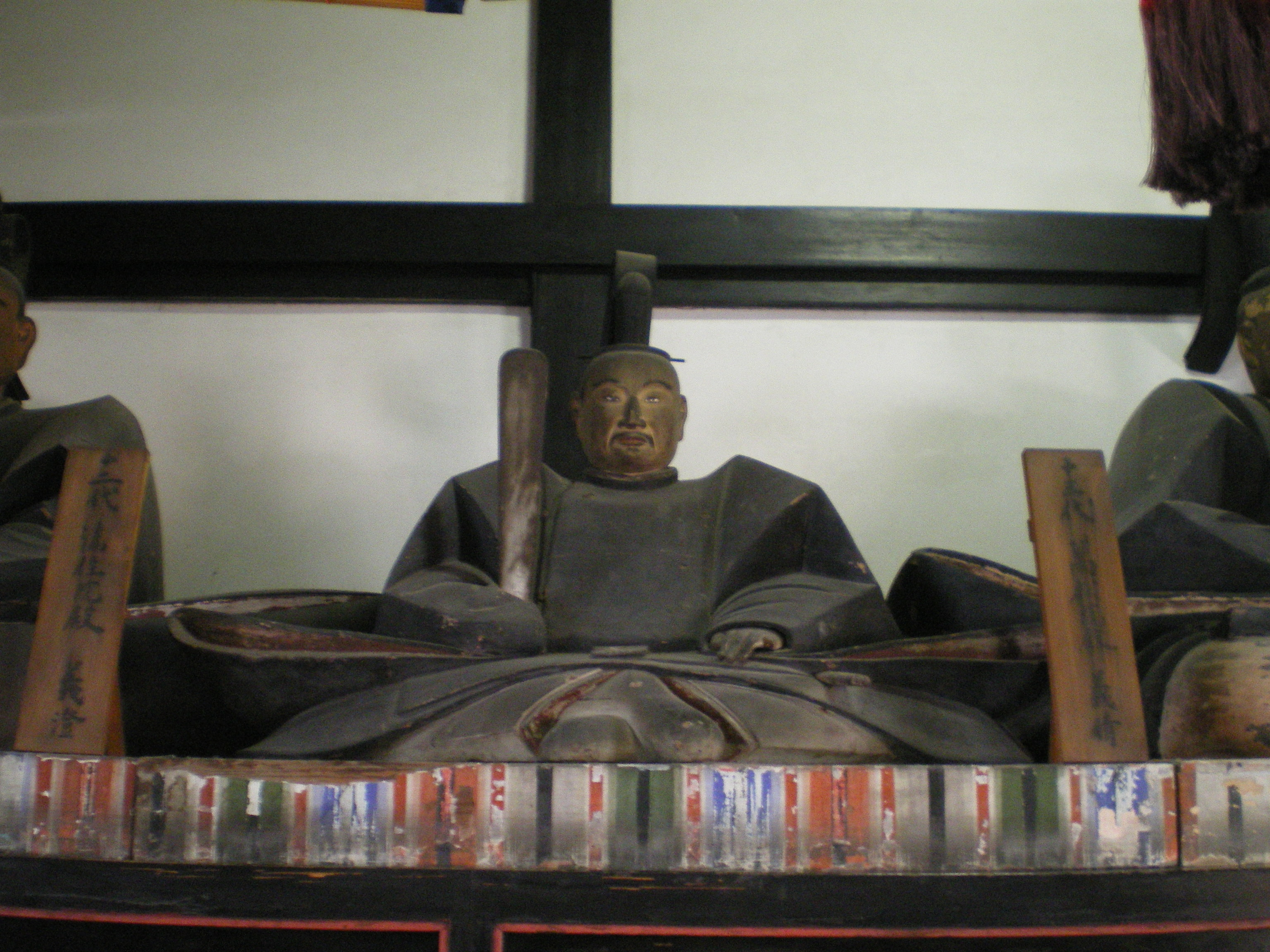
Wooden statue of Ashikaga Yoshiharu enshrined at Tōji-in.

== Biography ==
His childhood name was Kameomaru (亀王丸). On 1 May 1521, after Shōgun Ashikaga Yoshitane and Hosokawa Takakuni struggled for power over the shogunate and Yoshitane withdrew to Awaji Island, the way was clear for Ashikaga Yoshiharu to be installed as shōgun as he enters Kyoto.

In 1521, Hosokawa Takakuni orchestrated the appointment of Yoshiharu as shōgun. By 1526, tumultuous events marked by the Kasai and Miyoshi rebellions unfolded. In 1528, the political landscape shifted dramatically as Yoshiharu was ousted by Miyoshi Nagamoto, setting the stage for a period of significant change.

The 1530s further complicated the era, beginning with the eruption of the Ikkō rebellion in 1533. 1536 became a pivotal year with Emperor Go-Nara's ascension, and by 1538, internal strife plagued the Koga Kubō's family, introducing new layers of discord. Later in 1546 Yoshiharu sought refuge in Ōmi, while his son, Yoshiteru, assumed the role of shōgun in exile.

Void of any political power and repeatedly forced from the capital in Kyoto, Yoshiharu retired in 1546 over a political struggle between Miyoshi Nagayoshi and Hosokawa Harumoto making his son Ashikaga Yoshiteru the thirteenth shōgun. He died on 20th May, 1550. Later in 1568, supported by Oda Nobunaga, his other son Ashikaga Yoshiaki became the fifteenth shōgun.

== Family ==
- Father: Ashikaga Yoshizumi
- Mother: Hino Akiko
- Wife: Keijuin (1514–1565)
- Concubines:
  - Oodate Tsuneoki's daughter
- Children:
  - Ashikaga Yoshiaki by Keijuin
  - Ashikaga Yoshiteru by Keijuin
  - Ashikaga Shuko (d. 1565)
  - Shiratori Yoshihisa (d. 1547)
  - daughter married Takeda Yoshimune
  - daughter married Miyoshi Yoshitsugu
  - daughter married Karasume Kosen
  - Nun in Hyokoji temple

== Eras of Yoshiharu's bakufu ==
The years in which Yoshiharu was shōgun are more specifically identified by more than one era name or nengō.

- Daiei (1521–1528)
- Kyōroku (1528–1532)
- Tenbun (1532–1555)

== Notes ==
Preceded by Ashikaga Yoshitane	Shōgun: Ashikaga Yoshiharu; 1521–1546	Succeeded by Ashikaga Yoshiteru
