= Meiō =

Period of Japanese history (1492–1501)

Meiō (明応), also known as Mei-ō, was a Japanese era name (年号, nengō; "year name") after Entoku and before Bunki. This period spanned the years from July 1492 (534 years ago) through February 1501 (525 years ago). Reigning emperors were Go-Tsuchimikado-tennō (後土御門天皇) and Go-Kashiwabara-tennō (後柏原天皇).

== Change of era ==
- 1492 Meiō gannen (明応元年): The era name was changed to mark an event or a number of events. The old era ended and a new one commenced in Entoku 4.

== Events of the Meiō era ==
- 1492 (Meiō 1, 8th month): Shōgun Yoshimura led an army against Takayori in Ōmi Province. He laid siege to Mii-dera. Takayori saved himself by escaping in the slopes of Mount Koka. Then, Shōgun Yoshimura returned to Heian-kyō.
- 1492 (Meiō 2, 1st month): The kampaku Ichijō Fuyuyoshi was named daijō-daijin.
- 1492 (Meiō 2, 2nd month): Shōgun Yoshimura, accompanied by Hatakeyama Masanaga, marched against Kawachi Province, with plans to capture and put to death Hatakeyama Toshitoyo, the son of Yoshinari.
- September 12, 1495 (Meiō 4, 24th day of the 8th month): Earthquake at Kamakura (35.100°N 139.500°E), 7.1 on the Surface-wave magnitude scale (M_{s}).
- July 9, 1498 (Meiō 7, 20th day of the 6th month): Earthquake in the Enshū-nada Sea (34.400°N 137.700°E), 6.4 M_{s}.
- September 20, 1498 (Meiō 7, 2nd day of the 7th month): Earthquake in the Enshū-nada Sea (34.000°N 138.100°E), 8.3 M_{s} ; and also on that same day, another earthquake in Nankaidō (33.500°N 135.200°E), 7.5 M_{s}.

== See also ==
- List of tsunamis

== Notes ==
Preceded by Entoku	Era or nengō Meiō; 1492–1501	Succeeded by Bunki
