= Ashikaga Yoshitane =

Military ruler of Japan (1490–1493, 1508–1521)

- 足利 義稙
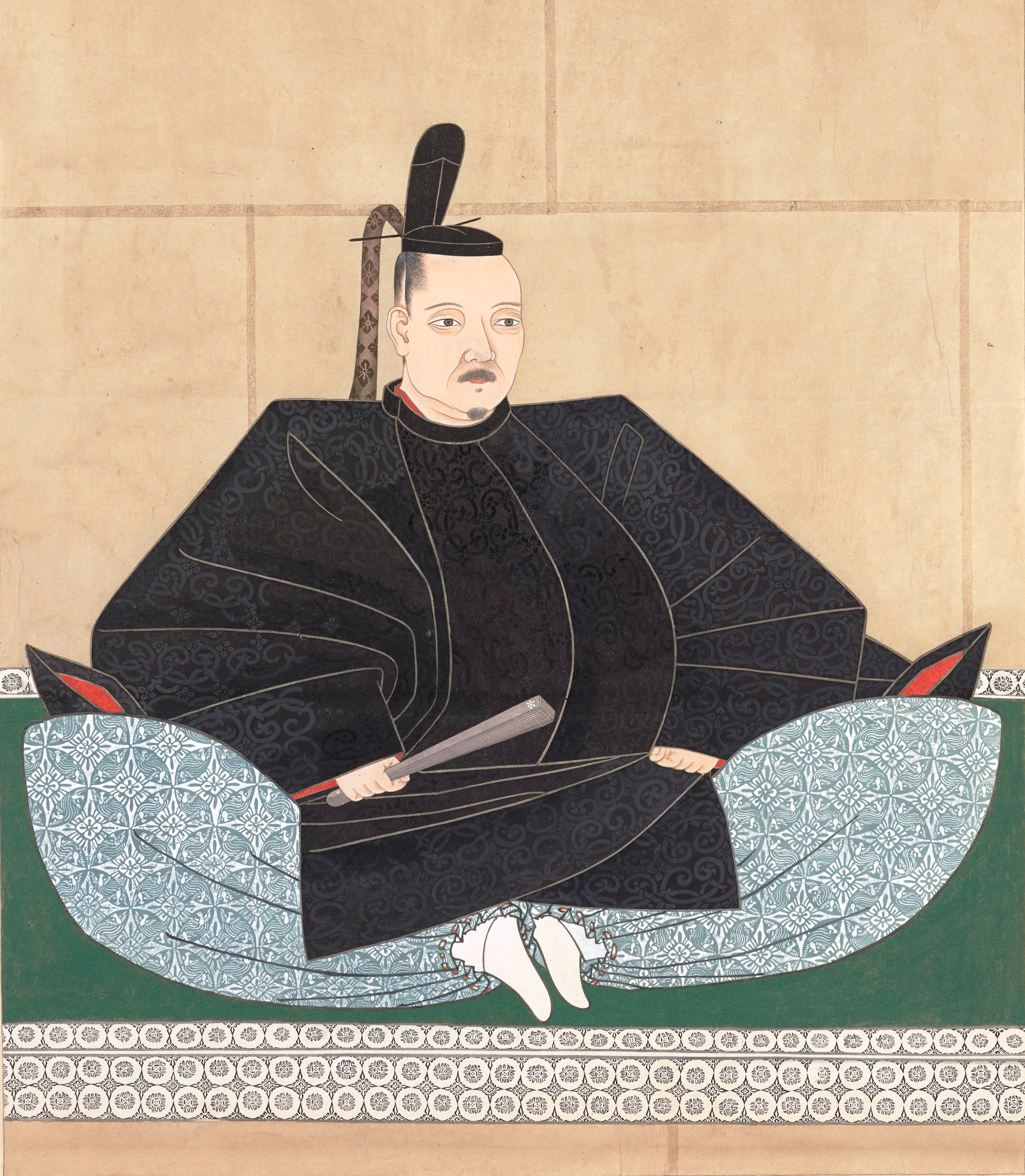

Shōgun
- In office 1508–1521
- Monarch: Go-Kashiwabara
- Preceded by: Ashikaga Yoshizumi
- Succeeded by: Ashikaga Yoshiharu
- In office 1490–1493
- Monarch: Go-Tsuchimikado
- Preceded by: Ashikaga Yoshihisa
- Succeeded by: Ashikaga Yoshizumi

Personal details
- Born: Ashikaga Yoshiki (足利 義材); September 9, 1466
- Died: May 23, 1523 (aged 56) Ōmi Province, Japan
- Spouse(s): Seiun-in, daughter of Hosokawa Shigeyuki
- Parents: Ashikaga Yoshimi (father); Hino Yoshiko (mother)
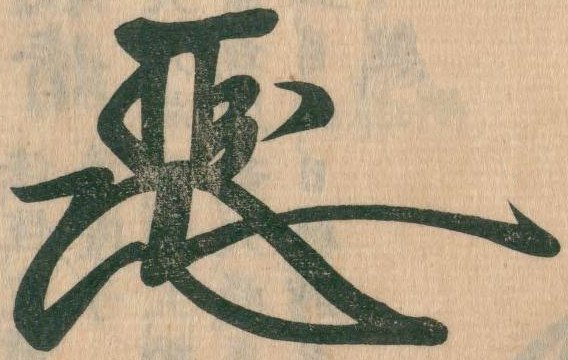
- Signature

Ashikaga Yoshitane (足利 義稙; September 9, 1466 – May 23, 1523), also known as Ashikaga Yoshiki (足利 義材), was the 10th shōgun of the Ashikaga shogunate who headed the shogunate first from 1490 to 1493 and then again from 1508 to 1521 during the Muromachi period of Japan.

Yoshitane was the son of Ashikaga Yoshimi and grandson of the sixth shōgun Ashikaga Yoshinori. In his early life, he was named Yoshiki (sometimes translated as Yoshimura), and then Yoshitada — including the period of when he is first installed as shōgun; however, he changed his name to Yoshitane in 1501 in a period when he was temporarily exiled, and it is by this name that he is generally known today.

The 9th shōgun Ashikaga Yoshihisa died in 1489 on a battlefield of southern Ōmi Province. Yoshihisa left no heir; and Yoshitane became Sei-i Taishōgun a year later.

== Events of Yoshitane's bakufu ==
Yoshitane was appointed shōgun in 1490. Hōjō Sōun gains control of Izu the following year. In 1493, Hatakeyama Yoshitoyo forced Yoshitane to abdicate after he lost in a power struggle against Hosokawa Masamoto. Yoshitane was formally replaced by the eleventh shōgun, Ashikaga Yoshizumi.

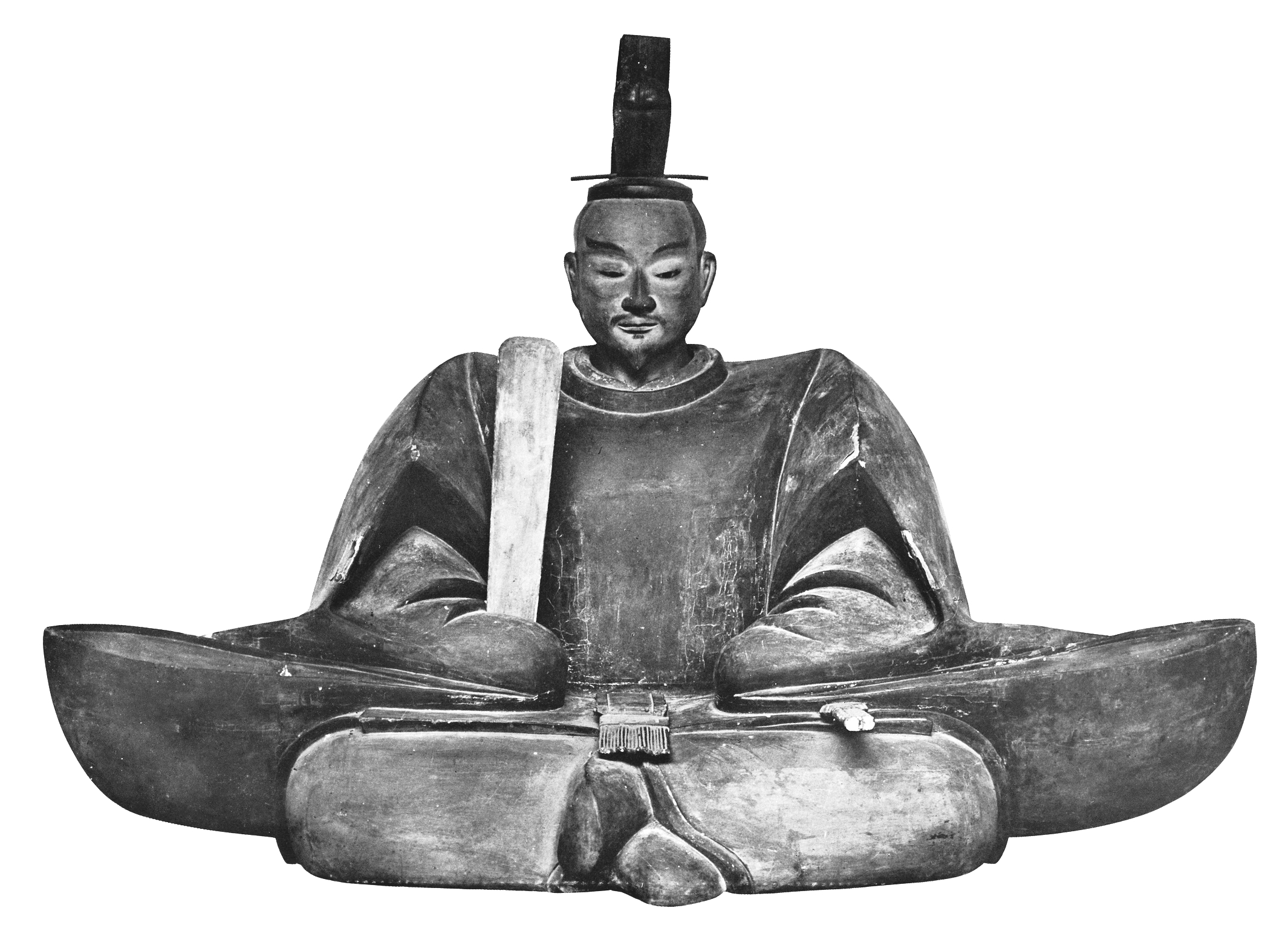
Wooden statue of Yoshitane at Tōji-in.

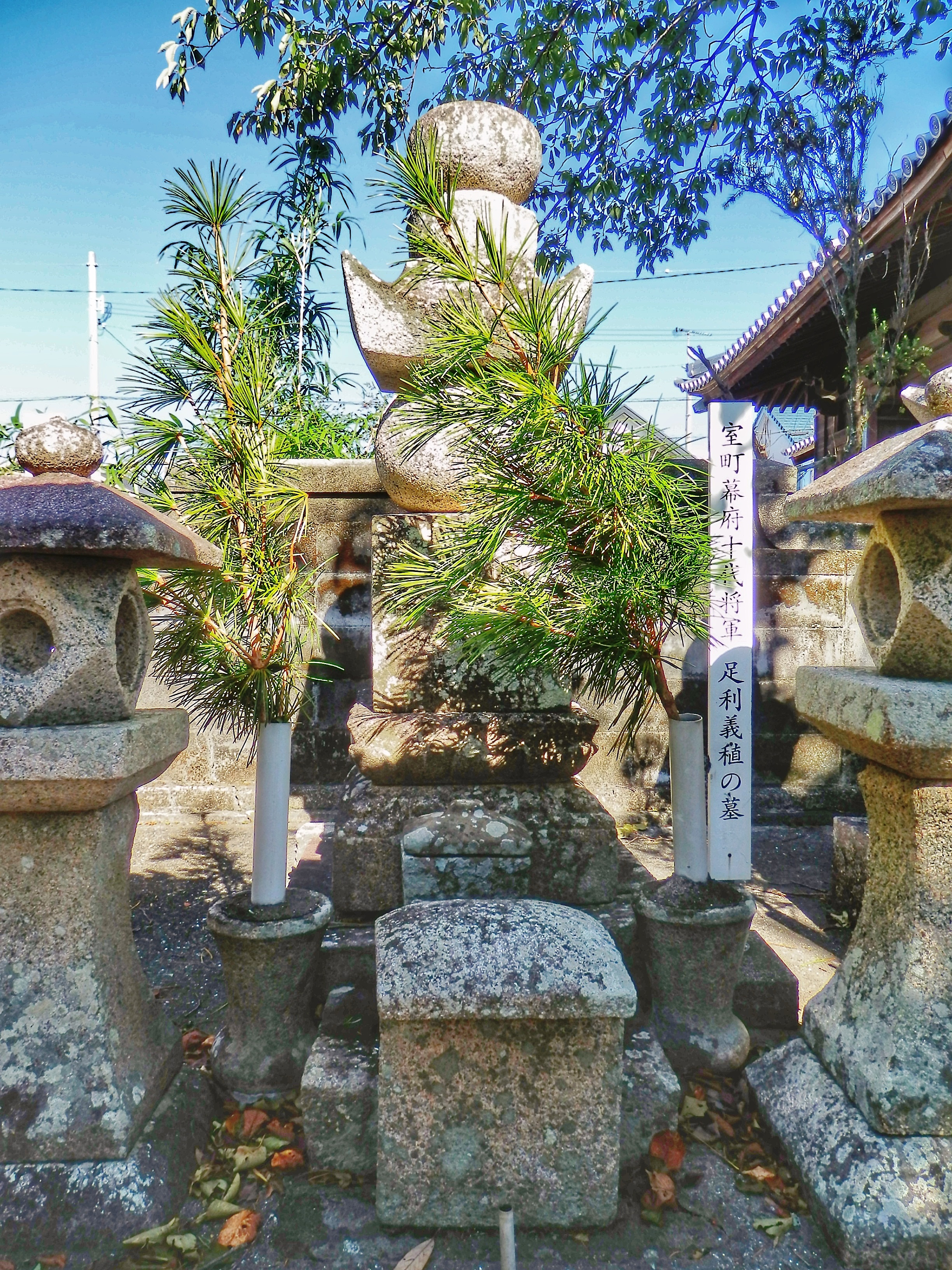
Tomb of Yoshitane at Saiko-ji, Tokushima Prefecture.

Emperor Go-Kashiwabara acceded to the throne in 1500. Ōuchi Yoshioki restored Yoshitane to the position of Sei-i Taishōgun from Yoshizumi. In 1520, a succession crisis occurred over Hosokawa Takakuni's post. When Takakuni became Kanrei (shogun's deputy), Yoshitane strongly opposed him and he was driven out. In 1521, Emperor Go-Kashiwabara appointed Ashikaga Yoshiharu as the twelfth shōgun after Takakuni arranged him to replace Yoshitane.

Eventually, after a further power struggle with the Hosokawa clan and especially with Hosokawa Takakuni, Yoshitane was forced to withdraw to Awaji Island. He died in Awa province, on the island of Shikoku in 1523.

== Yoshitane's heirs and successors ==
Shōgun Yoshitane adopted the son of Yoshizumi who was his cousin, Ashikaga Yoshitsuna and he designated Yoshitsuna as his heir and as his anticipated successor as shogun. However, when Yoshitane died prematurely, he was not succeeded by who he had chosen; rather, his father's newly designated heir was accepted by the shogunate as shōgun Yoshizumi.

In other words, after the death of his son, shōgun Yoshimasa adopted the son of his brother, Yoshimi. After the death of his adopted son, Yoshimasa adopted the son of another brother, Masatomo. Shogun Yoshimasa was succeeded by shōgun Yoshihisa (Yoshimasa's natural son), then by shōgun Yoshitane (Yoshimasa's first adopted son), and then by shōgun Yoshizumi (Yoshimasa's second adopted son). Yoshizumi's progeny would become shōguns in due course.

Eventually, the great-grandson of Yoshitane would be installed as a puppet shōgun for a brief period, but external power struggles would unseat him, and the Ashikaga dynasty of shōguns would end.

== Family ==
- Father: Ashikaga Yoshimi
- Mother: daughter of Uramatsu Shigemasa
- Wife: Seiyun'in
- Concubine: daughter of Yamana Toyoshige
- Children:
  - Takewakamaru
  - a daughter
- Adopted Son: Ashikaga Yoshitsuna

== Eras of Yoshitane's bakufu ==
The years in which Yoshitane was shogun are more specifically identified by more than one era name or nengō.

- Entoku (1489–1492)
- Meiō (1492–1501)
- Bunki (1501–1504)
- Eishō (1504–1521)
- Daiei (1521–1528)

== Notes ==
Preceded by Ashikaga Yoshihisa	Shōgun: Ashikaga Yoshitane; 1490–1493	Succeeded by Ashikaga Yoshizumi
Preceded by Ashikaga Yoshizumi	Shōgun: Ashikaga Yoshitane; 1508–1521	Succeeded by Ashikaga Yoshiharu
