= Yakushiji Motoichi =

Japanese samurai

Yakushiji Motokazu (薬師寺 元一, 1475 – 1504) was a Japanese samurai of the early Sengoku period, who served the Hosokawa clan. Motokazu was a retainer of Hosokawa Masamoto and deputy governor of Settsu Province. In the Autumn of 1504 he rebelled against Masamoto and marched to Kyoto but his rebellion was defeated seventeen days later when Masamoto's forces took his castle of Yodo. Motokazu was captured and committed seppuku.
