= Hosokawa Masamoto =

Japanese deputy-shōgun, daimyo and shugo

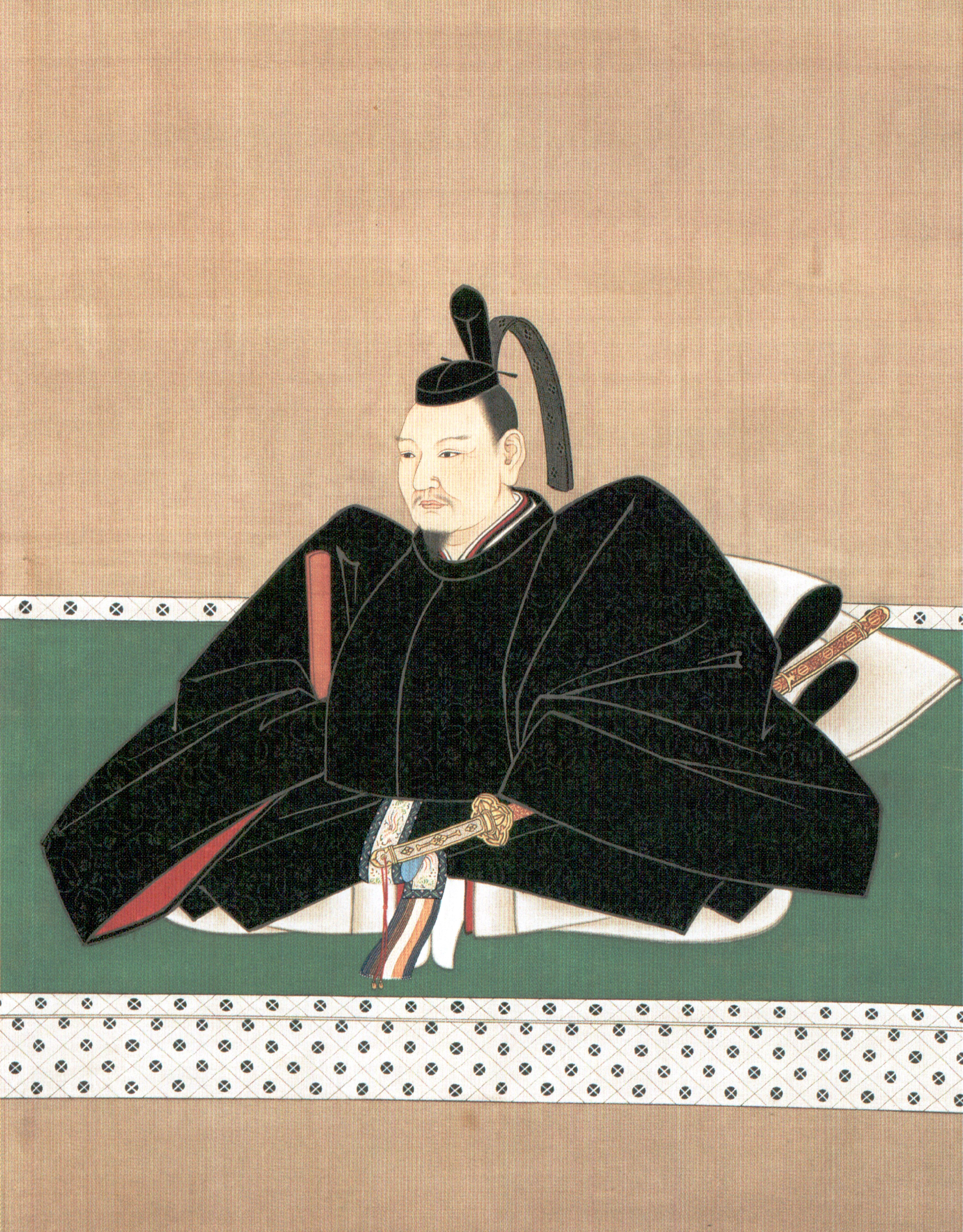
Hosokawa Masamoto

Hosakawa Masamoto (細川 政元; 1466 – August 1, 1507) was a deputy-shōgun, daimyo and shugo of the Hosokawa clan of Japan, and son of Hosokawa Katsumoto. Masamoto was appointed to the rank of deputy-shogun in 1486, but lost this status to his rival Hatakeyama Masanaga. His childhood name was Sumiakamaru (聡明丸).

When the Shogun, Ashikaga Yoshihisa, died childless during the year of 1489, Masamoto supported the nomination of Ashikaga Yoshizumi as successor in opposition to Ashikaga Yoshitane. Masamoto thought that the post of deputy-shogun would return to the Hosokawa clan. After Yoshitane became the shogun, he was deposed by Masamoto in 1493, setting a pattern that marked further decline of the Ashikaga Shogunate.

To combat the faction led by deposed Yoshitane and Masanaga, in particular to help with a stalled assault on Hatakeyama Yoshihide at Konda castle in late 1505, Masamoto forcefully enlisted the Ikko-ikki armies in 1504 led by the Honganji temple, though some factions continued to support Yoshitane.

The same year, Masamoto led a campaign against his opponents of Yamashiro Province. Masamoto who was childless (many thought he was a homosexual) then adopted Sumiyuki and Sumimoto as his sons. The retainers of Hosokawa then disputed for very long to whom the successor of the Hosokawa would be. In 1504, Masamoto eliminated Yakushiji Motoichi who was a follower of Sumimoto (whom he did not want as successor). In 1506, Masamoto was threatened by an army led by Miyoshi Yukinaga, another supporter of Sumimoto.

Meanwhile, Yoshitane continued to resist, and enlisted the help of the Hatakeyama clan and other allies. Yoshitane led troops to the assistance of Masanaga. Masamoto ultimately defeated those of Masanaga and Yoshitane in 1506, with Masanaga killed himself during the battle, and Yoshitane becoming a prisoner at Kyoto.

Due to Masamoto then choosing someone else as the successor, Kosai Motonaga, along with Sumiyuki, broke into the house of Masamoto during the year 1507 and killed him while he was taking a bath.

== Family ==
- Father: Hosokawa Katsumoto
- Mother: daughter of Yamana Sōzen
- Sister: Tōshōin
- Adopted Sons:
  - Hosokawa Sumiyuki (1489–1507)
  - Hosokawa Sumimoto
  - Hosokawa Takakuni
