= Ashikaga Yoshizumi =

Military ruler of Japan from 1494 to 1508

- 足利 義澄
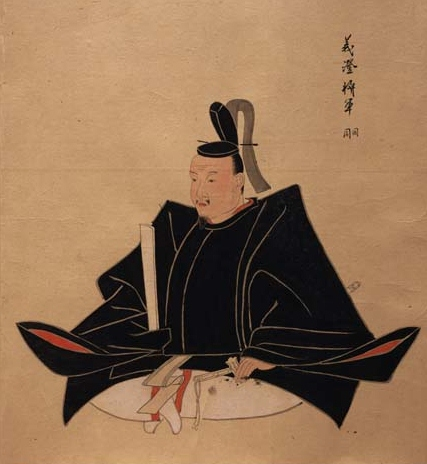

Shōgun
- In office 1493–1508
- Monarchs: Go-Tsuchimikado; Go-Kashiwabara
- Preceded by: Ashikaga Yoshiki
- Succeeded by: Ashikaga Yoshitane (Yoshiki, restore)

Personal details
- Born: January 15, 1481
- Died: September 6, 1511 (aged 30)
- Spouse: Hino Ako
- Parents: Ashikaga Masatomo (father); daughter of Mushakōji Takamitsu (mother)
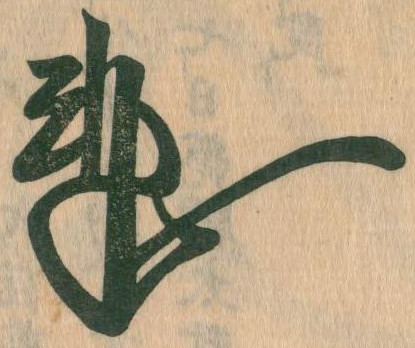
- Signature

Ashikaga Yoshizumi (足利 義澄; January 15, 1481 – September 6, 1511) was the 11th shōgun of the Ashikaga shogunate who reigned from 1494 to 1508 during the Muromachi period of Japan. He was the son of Ashikaga Masatomo and grandson of the sixth shōgun Ashikaga Yoshinori. His childhood name was Seikō (清晃), Yoshizumi was first called Yoshitō (sometimes translated as Yoshimichi), then Yoshitaka.

Yoshizumi was adopted by the 8th shōgun Ashikaga Yoshimasa. He was installed by Hosokawa Masamoto as Sei-i Taishōgun. He was stripped of the title in 1508 by the 10th shōgun Ashikaga Yoshitane, who became shōgun for a second period of time.

Two of Yoshizumi's sons would themselves become shōguns. Ashikaga Yoshiharu would hold nominal powers as the twelfth Muromachi shōgun; and Ashikaga Yoshihide assumed nominal powers as the fourteenth shōgun.

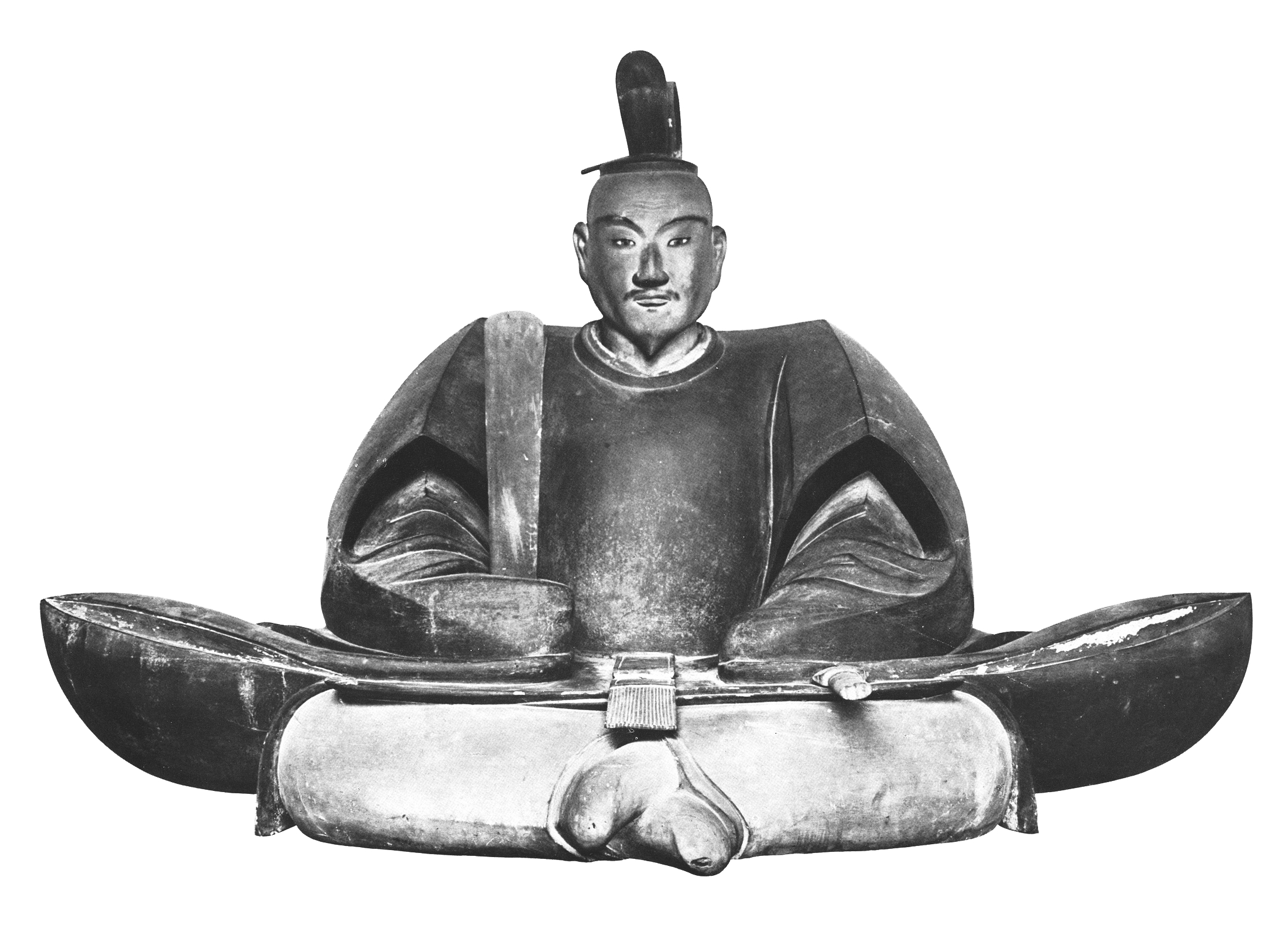
Wooden statue of Yoshizumi at Tōji-in.

== Family ==
- Father: Ashikaga Masatomo (1435–1491)
- Mother: daughter of Mushanakoji Takamitsu
- Adopted Father: Ashikaga Yoshimasa
- Adopted Mother: Hino Tomiko
- Wife: Hino Akiko
- Concubine: speculated daughter of Shiba Yoshihiro or daughter of Rokkaku Takayori
- Children:
  - Ashikaga Yoshiharu by Akiko
  - Ashikaga Yoshitsuna by daughter of Shiba or Rokkaku

== Events of Yoshizumi's bakufu ==
Significant events shape the period during which Yoshizumi was shōgun:

- 1494 – Hosokawa Masamoto has Yoshizumi appointed shōgun.
- 1495 – Hōjō Sōun captures Odawara.
- 1500 – Go-Kashiwabara succeeds.

== Eras of Yoshizumi's bakufu ==
The years in which Yoshizumi was shogun are more specifically identified by more than one era name or nengō.

- Meiō (1492–1501)
- Bunki (1501–1504)
- Eishō (1504–1521)

== Notes ==
Preceded by Ashikaga Yoshitane	Shōgun: Ashikaga Yoshizumi; 1494–1508	Succeeded by Ashikaga Yoshitane
