= Miyoshi clan =

Japanese clan

Miyoshi clan 三好氏
- Miyoshi clan mon
- Home province: Awa
- Parent house: Minamoto clan Takeda clan Ogasawara clan
- Titles: Daimyō
- Founder: Miyoshi Yoshinaga
- Dissolution: 1582

Miyoshi clan (三好氏, Miyoshi-shi) is a Japanese family descended from Emperor Seiwa (850–880) and the Minamoto clan (Seiwa-Genji). They are a cadet branch of the Ogasawara clan and the Takeda clan.

At the beginning of the 14th century AD, Ogasawara Nagafusa settled in Shikoku. His eighth generation descendant Yoshinaga settled in the district of Miyoshi (Awa province) and took the name of the place. They were vassals of the Hosokawa clan, then powerful in Shikoku.

During the Sengoku period, they controlled several provinces, including Settsu and Awa. Though they would fade from prominence, the Ogasawara, a clan closely related to them, would continue as a major political force throughout the Edo period.

Among the retainers to the clan were Matsunaga Danjō Hisahide and his son Hisamichi from the Matsunaga clan during the Sengoku period.

== Ancestry ==
The family name of the clan is Genji (Minamoto Clan). It descends from one of the lineages of the Seiwa Genji (the Shinano Genji that falls into the branch family of Kawachi Genji) and is a branch family of the Ogasawara clan. It is believed that the clan used a deceptive name as there are many contradictions in each existing genealogy. The clan is also called the Awa Ogasawara clan. The clan moved from Shinano Province into Miyoshi County, Awa Province, where it set its home ground.

== Emergence ==
In the late Kamakura period, the clan name was in use in the Awa Province. In the early period of the Northern and Southern Courts, the Miyoshi clan was loyal to the Southern Court, and there was a period when it conflicted with the Hosokawa clan on the Northern Court. However, with the Southern Court losing ground and the Hosokawa clan growing its influence in the bakufu (the Northern Court), the Miyoshi clan changed sides.

== Early Muromachi period ==
In the Muromachi period, Miyoshi Yukinaga, dubbed a great commander having both wisdom and courage, served the Hosokawa clan as Shogunal Deputy. In the case of the succession dispute in the Hosokawa clan, Nagayuki supported Hosokawa Sumimoto, who was a child of the shugo of Awa of the Hosokawa clan and later adopted by kanrei Hosokawa Masamoto. Nagayuki moved from place to place to fight and achieved military exploits gaining influence in the Kinki region and Shikoku.

After the death of Yukinaga, his grandson Motonaga supported the young lord Hosokawa Harumoto. Motonaga made achievements by helping Harumoto become kanrei, and he ended up being the influential power in the Hosokawa clan. Viewing Motonaga's power as a threat, Harumoto accepted the slander from Masanaga and others who belonged to the Motonaga clan and were envious of Kizawa Nagamasa and Motonaga's rise. In 1532, with the help of the Ikkō-ikki sect that hated Miyoshi Motonaga, who was a patron of the Hokke sect, Harumoto attacked Motonaga in Kenpon-Ji Temple in Sakai and forced Motonaga to kill himself. Due to the feud, the Miyoshi clan declined temporarily.

== Height ==
Miyoshi Nagayoshi was braver and more resourceful than his father. At first, Nagayoshi served Harumoto as his loyal vassal. However, he married a daughter of Yuza Naganori, who was the shugodai of Kawachi Province and had a strong influence in the Kinki region. His influence extended not only to Awa Province but also to Settsu Province. In cooperation with his brothers Miyoshi Yoshikata (Awa), Sogō Kazumasa (Sanuki), and Atagi Fuyuyasu, he beat the forces of Kizawa Nagamasa at the battle of Taihei-ji Temple and Miyoshi Nagamasa, both of whom had been his father's enemy.

In 1549, Nagayoshi started to take revenge for his father's death. With the reinforcement from his father-in-law Yuza Naganori, he supported Hosokawa Ujitsuna, the child of Hosokawa Takakuni. Nagayoshi defeated Miyoshi Nagamasa, who had been a loyal vassal of Harumoto, and backed his power on the military side in Enami, Settsu Province (the Battle of Eguchi). Being afraid of Nagayoshi's power, Harumoto ran away to Ōtsu, and the Harumoto administration collapsed. As a result, Nagayoshi became famous as a daimyo in the Sengoku period.

Nagayoshi also fought with the shogun Ashikaga Yoshiteru and drove him away to Ōmi Province. He grew to be a daidaimyo (daimyo having a greater stipend) to govern, in total, nine provinces in the Kinki region (Settsu, Kawachi, Yamato, Tanba, Yamashiro, Izumi) and Shikoku (Awa, Sanuki, Awaji), as well as parts of Harima, Iyo, and Tosa provinces.

As he went up to Kyoto and declared his supreme power over Japan, he was called the first tenkabito and tried to establish the Miyoshi administration. Facing strong resistance from the old power, Nagayoshi stopped fighting with Yoshiteru. He supported Yoshiteru and moved into the system to govern by Yoshiteru - Ujitsuna - Nagayoshi in order. Nagayoshi held real power while Yoshiteru and Ujitsuna were puppets.

== Decline ==
Nagayoshi was a man of elegance and taste who loved renga (linked verse), favored Zen, and enjoyed reading classics such as The Tale of Genji. He showed a tolerant attitude toward Christians and allowed various religions such as Buddhism, Shinto, and Christianity. Due to his attitude, confrontation among Buddhists (between the Hokke and Ikkō sects) decreased. He posted his capable brothers in various places to administer his extended power. He restored Kyoto, which had been destroyed by battles since the Ōnin War. He acted energetically and made achievements including developing the town of Sakai into a large trading port.

However, the resistance from the old power did not stop, and Hatakeyama Takamasa, one of the sankanrei (three families in the post of kanrei, or shogunal deputy), and Rokkaku Yoshikata, a hankoku shugo (military governor in charge of the half area of the province) and male cousin of Harumoto raised a rebellion against the Miyoshi. With the struggle with them, Nagayoshi lost his brother Yoshikata in the battle of Kumeda (present Kishiwada City). He survived with his younger brothers, Sogō Kazumasa and Atagi Fuyuyasu, and died at the age of 41. After the death of Nagayoshi, the adopted child Yoshitsugu from the Miyoshi clan, succeeded. As he was so young, Matsunaga Hisahide, the karō (chief retainer), and Miyoshi sanninshū (three chief retainers of the Miyoshi clan) took the actual power. With the successive deaths of Nagayoshi and his younger brothers and as the result of Hisahide and sanninshū bickering over the leadership, the Miyoshi clan declined.

== Fall ==
The clan supported the 14th shogun Ashikaga Yoshihide from their home province of Awa. But in 1568, when Oda Nobunaga entered Kyoto under the 15th shogun Ashikaga Yoshiaki, the Miyoshi clan did not have the strength to hold out against Nobunaga. The Miyoshi clan challenged Nobunaga to a decisive battle but lost, and some of the Miyoshi fled to Awa while others became vassals of Nobunaga.

Later, when the shogun Yoshiaki conflicted with Nobunaga and the anti-Nobunaga network was laid, Miyoshi Yoshitsugu and the Miyoshi clan sanninshū took Yoshiaki's side and confronted Nobunaga. However, they did not have the strength to hold out against Nobunaga's more powerful military. In 1573, while he was under attack by Sakuma Nobumori, one of Nobunaga's vassals, Yoshitsugu killed himself. The head family of the Miyoshi clan died out.

In Awa Province in Shikoku, Miyoshi Nagaharu succeeded Miyoshi Yoshikata, and his real brother Sogō Masayasu still exerted influence in the eastern part of Shikoku. However, after Nagaharu killed his loyal vassal Shinohara Nagafusa, the vassals of Nagaharu became anxious and defected from the Miyoshi clan. Later, Nagaharu was killed by his vassal acquainted with Chōsokabe Motochika in Tosa Province.

== Later ==
Miyoshi Yasunaga became Nobunaga's vassal and was given territory in part of Kawachi Province. Sogō Masayasu served Toyotomi Hideyoshi and gained territory in Sanuki Province. Yasunaga was unaccounted for after the Honnō-ji Incident, and Masayasu died in the Battle of Hetsugigawa and had his rank of samurai and properties revoked.

In 1615, Sogō Masahide, the child of Masayasu, and Miyoshi Masayasu, the only survivor of the Miyoshi sanninshu, died in the Sieges of Osaka. Miyoshi Masakatsu survived by serving the Tokugawa clan while others served other daimyos.

Miyoshi Yoshikane and Miyoshi Yoshishige, who were the eldest legitimate son and second son, respectively, of Miyoshi Yoshitsugu fled to Ibuki island in Sanuki Province and settled there. During the period of the rule by the Ikoma clan, Miyoshi Yoshikiyo, the grandson of Yoshikane, was given the endorsement of the Administrative Board from the Ikoma clan and changed his family name to Sakuemon. At Ibuki-Hachiman-jinja Shrine on Ibuki Island, there still exists an ema (votive horse tablet) depicting the scene of Yoshikane and his vassals with reduced 80 horses by gunshots getting to Ibuki Island and offering the seimon (covenant) to the shrine.

== In popular culture ==
- In the 2020 Taiga drama, Kirin ga Kuru, Miyoshi Nagayoshi is played by Kazuhiro Yamaji, Miyoshi Yoshitsugu by Hiroyasu Kurobe, Miyoshi Nagayasu by Shōgo Miyahara, Iwanari Tomomichi by Hiroki Takano and Miyoshi Sōi by Kenji Oka.

== Notable clan members ==
- Miyoshi Nagayoshi
- Miyoshi Yoshikata
- Sogō Kazumasa
- Sogō Masayasu
- Atagi Fuyuyasu
- Atagi Nobuyasu
- Miyoshi Yoshitsugu
- Iwanari Tomomichi
- Miyoshi Masanaga

== Miyoshi clan's prominent castles ==
- Akutagawayama Castle
- Iimoriyama Castle
- Shōzui Castle
- Kishiwada Castle
- Shigisan Castle
- Takiyama Castle (Hyōgo), Kōbe, Hyōgo.
- Shōryūji Castle
