= Aizumi, Tokushima =

Aizumi 藍住町
- Town
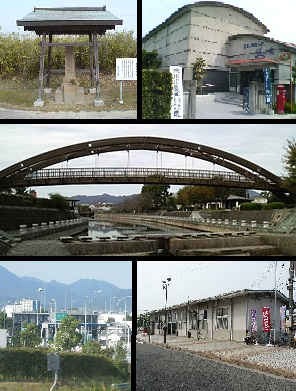
Shōzui Castle	Aizumi no Yakata
Shoboji River
Tokushima Expressway Aizumi IC	Shōzui Station
- Flag Emblem
- Interactive map of Aizumi
- Location in Japan
- Coordinates: 34°7′35.9″N 134°29′42.4″E
- Country: Japan
- Region: Shikoku
- Prefecture: Tokushima
- District: Itano

Area
  - Total: 16.27 km^{2} (6.28 sq mi)

Population (June 30, 2022)
  - Total: 35,512
  - Density: 2,183/km^{2} (5,653/sq mi)
- Time zone: UTC+09:00 (JST)
- City hall address: 52-1, Yakamimae, Okuno, Aizumi-cho, Itano-gun, Tokushima-ken 771-1292
- Website: Official website
- Symbols
- Flower: Chrysanthemum
- Tree: Cinnamomum camphora

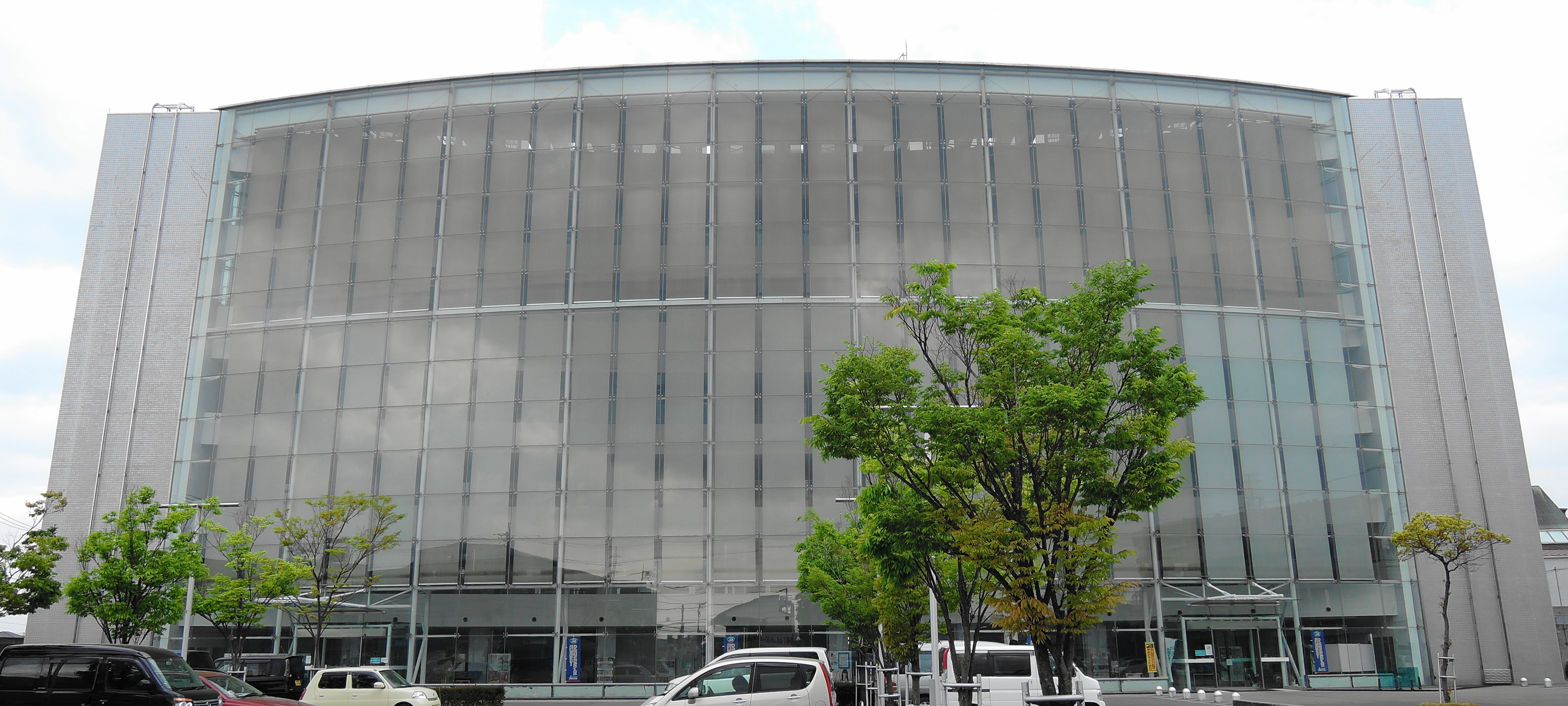
Aizumi Town Hall

Aizumi (藍住町, Aizumi-chō) is a town located in Itano District, in northeastern Tokushima Prefecture, Japan. As of 30 June 2022, the town had an estimated population of 35,512 in 15198 households and a population density of 2200 persons per km^{2}. The total area of the town is 16.27 square kilometres (6.28 sq mi).

== Geography ==
Aizumi is located in the northern part of Tokushima Prefecture, on the island of Shikoku. It is situated on the north side of the downstream area of the Yoshino River. The area is an alluvial fan which was once subject to frequent flooding before Edo period flood control projects shifted the course of the Yoshino River from its original stream to its current stream some three kilometers south. At 5.17 meters average elevation above sea level the area is a very flat area with no hilly or mountainous areas found within the confines of the town district.

=== Neighbouring municipalities ===
Tokushima Prefecture

- Ishii
- Itano
- Kamiita
- Kitajima
- Naruto
- Tokushima

== Climate ==
Aizumi has a humid subtropical climate (Köppen Cfa) characterized by warm summers and cool winters with light snowfall. The average annual temperature in Aizumi is 15.9 °C. The average annual rainfall is 1637 mm with September as the wettest month. The temperatures are highest on average in August, at around 26.6 °C, and lowest in January, at around 4.6 °C. The annual mean rainfall is 1,586.6 mm, and the average monthly discharge is 132.2 mm. During winter, the average monthly discharge is 50 mm throughout the season, with a touch of Seto Inland Sea-style climate being present.

== Demographics ==
Per Japanese census data, the population of Aizumi has been growing rapidly since the 1960s. With a population growth rate of 10% over the past 10 years, it is one of the most developed towns in Tokushima Prefecture.

Historical population
Year	Pop.	±%
1920	7,332	—
1930	7,439	+1.5%
1940	7,698	+3.5%
1950	10,937	+42.1%
1960	9,912	−9.4%
1970	10,244	+3.3%
1980	19,317	+88.6%
1990	25,674	+32.9%
2000	30,368	+18.3%
2010	33,336	+9.8%

== History ==
As with all of Tokushima Prefecture, the area of Aizumi was part of ancient Awa Province. From the Muromachi period, Shōzui Castle was the seat of the Hosokawa clan and later the Miyoshi clan who ruled as shugo of the province. Chōsokabe Motochika seized control of the province in the Sengoku period and Shōzui Castle fell into ruins. He was subsequently defeated by the forces of Toyotomi Hideyoshi. During the Edo period, the area was part of the holdings of Tokushima Domain ruled by the Hachisuka clan from their seat at Tokushima Castle, and Aizumi became an agricultural area noted for its production of indigo. The villages of Aizono (藍園村) and Sumiyoshi (住吉村) were established within Itano District, Tokushima with the creation of the modern municipalities' system on October 1, 1889. The two village merged on April 29, 1955, to form the town of Aizumi.

== Government ==
Aizumi has a mayor-council form of government with a directly elected mayor and a unicameral town council of 16 members. Aizumi, together with the other municipalities of Itano District, contributes four members to the Tokushima Prefectural Assembly. In terms of national politics, the town is part of Tokushima 2nd district of the lower house of the Diet of Japan.

== Economy ==
Aizumi has a mixed economy of agriculture and light manufacturing. The production of indigo dye and miso fermented bean paste are traditional local industries. Due to its geographical location and abundance of flat land for housing development, Aizumi is also developing into a commuter town for neighboring Tokushima.

== Education ==
Aizumi has four public elementary schools and two public middle schools operated by the town government, and one public high school operated by the Tokushima Prefectural Department of Education.

== Transportation ==
=== Railway ===
Shikoku Railway Company — Kōtoku Line

- Shōzui

=== Highways ===
- Tokushima Expressway
- The Shikoku Saburo Bridge across the Yoshino River links Aizumi with Tokushima city.

== Local attractions ==
- Shōzui Castle ruins, National Historic Site
