= Miyoshi Yoshitsugu =

Japanese daimyō

- 三好 義継
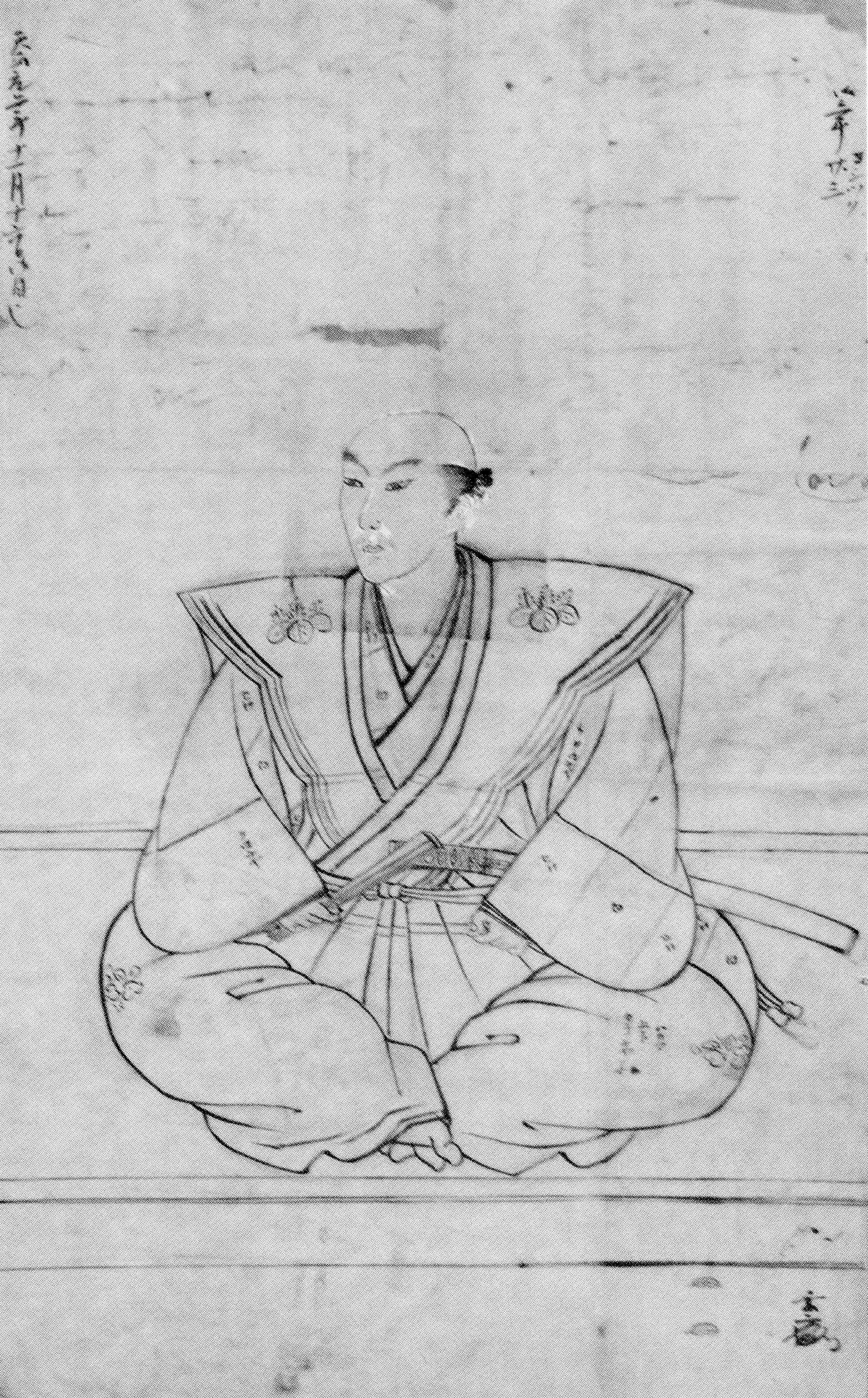

Head of Miyoshi clan
- In office 1564–1573
- Preceded by: Miyoshi Nagayoshi

Lord of Kawachi
- Preceded by: Sogō Kazumasa

Personal details
- Born: 1549
- Died: December 10, 1573 (aged 23–24)
- Parent: Sogō Kazumasa (father)
- Relatives: Miyoshi Nagayoshi (uncle); Miyoshi Yoshikata (uncle); Atagi Fuyuyasu (uncle)

Military service
- Allegiance: Miyoshi clan
- Rank: Daimyo
- Unit: Sogō clan
- Battles/wars: Honkokuji Incident (1569)

Miyoshi Yoshitsugu (三好 義継; 1549 – December 10, 1573), adopted son of Nagayoshi, was a samurai of the Sengoku period who was practically the last head of Miyoshi clan, daimyō of Kawachi Province of Japan. His wife was Ashikaga Yoshiaki's sister.

Born to Sogō Kazumasa in 1549, younger brother of Miyoshi Nagayoshi, he was initially known as Sogō Shigemasa (十河 重存). After 1561 when his father died, he was reared by Nagayoshi.

When Nagayoshi's eldest son Yoshioki died in 1563, he was adopted as a son and changed his surname to Miyoshi. The following year when Nagayoshi died, Yoshitsugu succeeded him as head of the clan.
