= Shōzui Castle =

- 勝瑞城
- Aizumi, Tokushima, Japan
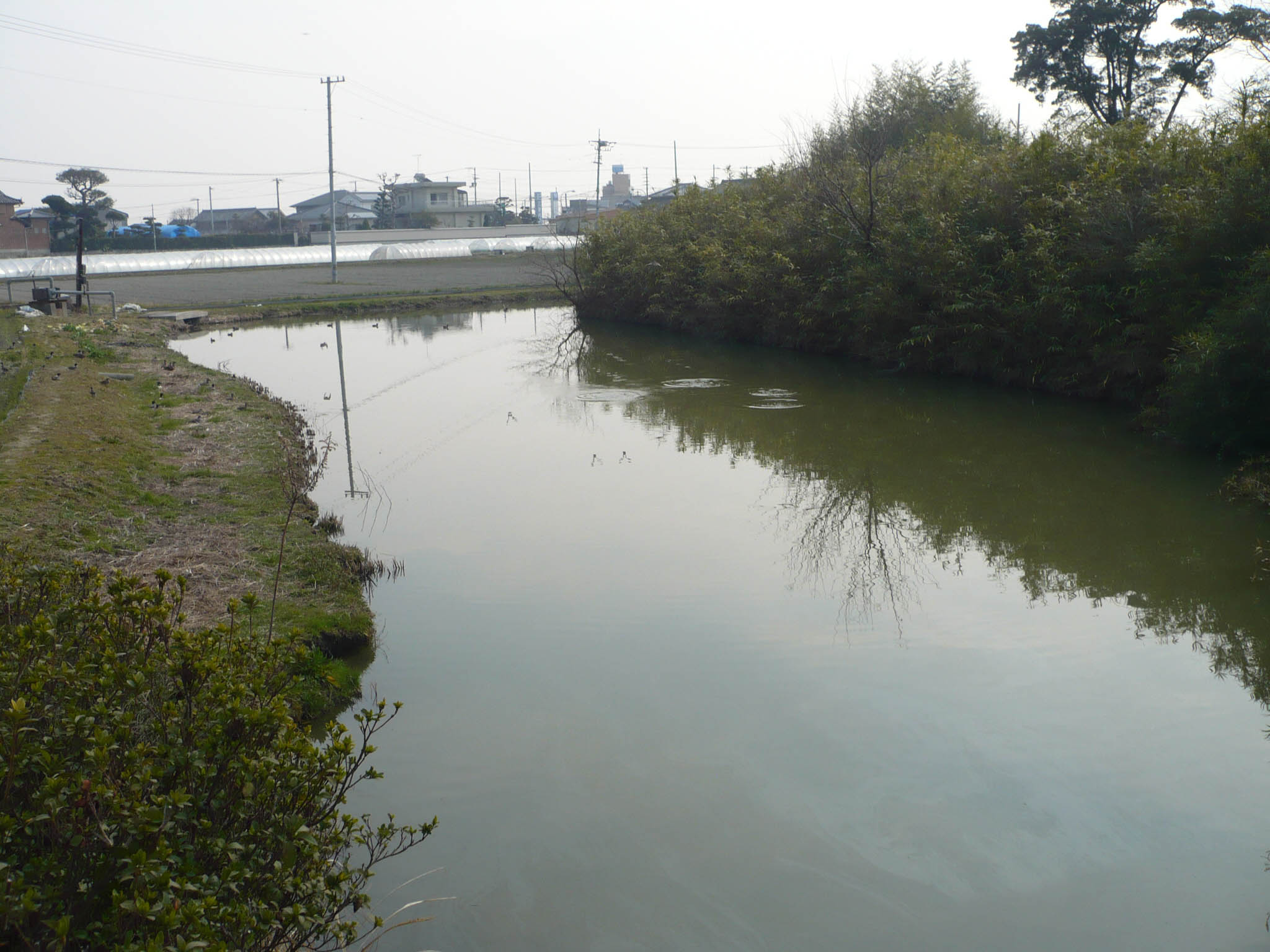
- remnants of a moat at Shōzui Castle

Site information
- Type: flatland-style Japanese castle
- Owner: Hosokawa clan, Miyoshi clan
- Condition: Ruins

Location
- Coordinates: 34°7′57.37″N 134°31′22.56″E

Site history
- Built: c.12th century
- Built by: Ogasawara Nagakiyo
- In use: Muromachi to Sengoku period
- Demolished: 1582
- Events: Battle of Nakatomigawa
- National Historic Site of Japan

Shōzui Castle (勝瑞城, Shōzui-jō) was a Muromachi to Sengoku period Japanese castle located in the town of Aizumi, Itano District, Tokushima Prefecture, Japan. Its ruins have been protected as a National Historic Site since 2001, with the area under protection expanded in 2015.

== History ==
Shōzui Castle is located on a loop of the former course of the Yoshino River, approximately five kilometers north from the center of Tokushima city. The present course of the river is now three kilometers to the south of the castle due to flood control projects in the Edo period, but when the castle was constructed it was directly on the river and could be reached by boat from the mainland of Honshu. The castle was surrounded by small creeks and marshes which formed part of its natural defenses.

It is unknown when this site was first fortified, but it is believed to have been by Ogasawara Nagakiyo in the Kamakura period. The castle was believed to have been taken over in the Nanboku-chō period by the Hosokawa clan, the shugo of Awa Province. The Hosokawa clan was large and was divided into several cadet houses. The Hosokawa clan rose to prominence during the Ōnin War against the Yamana clan, and under Hosokawa Masamoto; however, as he had no sons, he adopted Hosokawa Sumiyuki (1489-1507), Hosokawa Sumimoto (1489-1520) and Hosokawa Takakuni (1484-1531), who immediately became rivals.

Hosokawa Sumimoto was from the Awa Hosokawa, and he was challenged by Hosokawa Sumiyuki. Sumimoto mustered the support of the Miyoshi clan, who had once been the Awa Hosokawa's ancient enemies and how had now become their main retainers, and was able to defeat Sumiyuki. The next challenge came from Hosokawa Takakuni, who had allied with the powerful Ōuchi clan of Suō Province. Takakuni was more successful and defeated the Awa Hosokawa in Kyoto and their mainland territories, but he was unable to seize their territory in Shikoku which was successfully held by Hosokawa Harumoto (1514-1563), and Miyoshi Motonaga (1501-1532) at Shōzui Castle. Hosokawa Harumoto counterattacked in 1532, decisively defeating Takakuni, bout soon afterwards, he had a falling out with the Miyoshi clan which led to open warfare.

Under Miyoshi Nagayoshi, the Miyoshi clan displaced the Hosokawa as the most powerful retainers of the Ashikaga shogunate, and by eventually controlling eight provinces of western Japan, became one of the most powerful warlords in the country. Miyoshi Jikkyu (1527-1562), the younger brother of Nagayoshi, expelled Hosokawa Mochitaka and captured Shōzui Castle, which then became the main base of Miyoshi clan in Shikoku. Sogō Kazumasa was born in the castle in 1532.

However, the Miyoshi clan soon suffered from ill fortune, with the clan coming under the control of their senior retainer, Matsunaga Hisahide after Miyoshi Nagayoshi's brothers and sons were all killed one after another in battle, due to illness, or purged on suspicion of disloyalty. The weakened Miyoshi clan were driven back to Shikoku by the forces of Oda Nobunaga, where rent by internal squabbling, they were attacked by Chōsokabe Motochika from Tosa Province.

The Miyoshi made peace with Oda Nobunaga, who was concerned by the rapid expansion of the Chōsokabe. He ordered Hashiba Hideyoshi to Shikoku in 1582 to defeat the Chōsokabe. The death of Nobunaga stalled these plans, and the castle was attacked by Chōsokabe Motochika's army, Sogō Masayasu abandoned the castle in the Battle of Nakatomigawa and fled to Toramaru Castle. The castle was allowed to fall into ruins thereafter. Although Hideyoshi eventually defeated in Chōsokabe, the Miyoshi were not restored to their former territories and the castle was never rebuilt.

Currently, the ruins spread out over a series of enclosures measuring 1500 by 500 meters. The original residence of the Hosokawa was in the northwest corner of the castle, at the site of the Buddhist temple of Chifuku-ji. The residence of the Miyoshi clan was in the northeastern corner, where the temple of Kensho-ji snow located. Portons of a water moat which once surrounded a 100 square meter compound remain, along with the remnants of a dry landscape garden. The castlewas listed as one of the Continued Top 100 Japanese Castles in 2017.

The castle site is a ten-minute walk from JR Shikoku Shōzui Station.

== Gallery ==
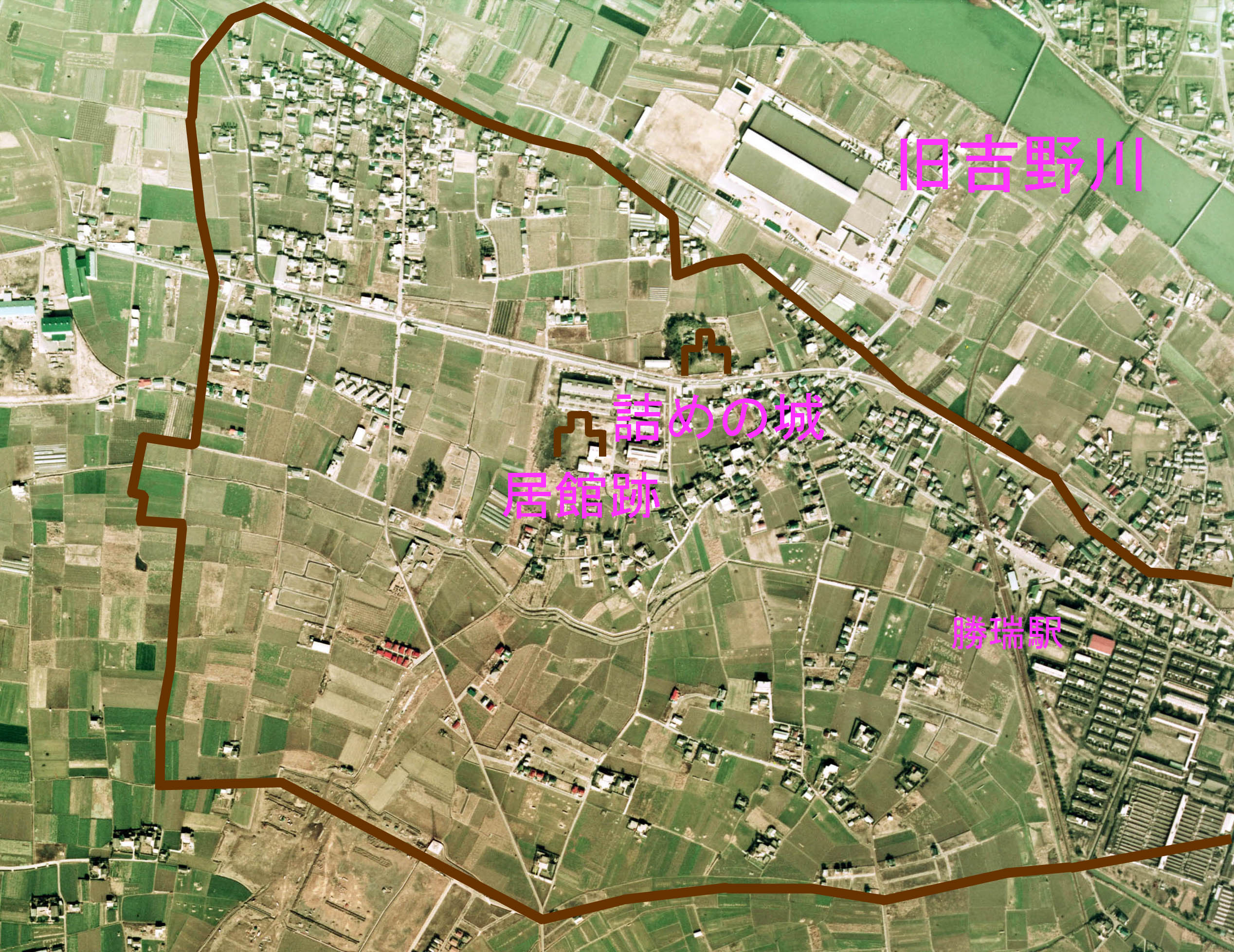
Aerual photograph

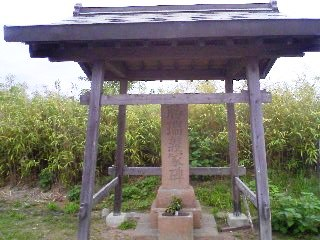
Shozui Gicho Monument

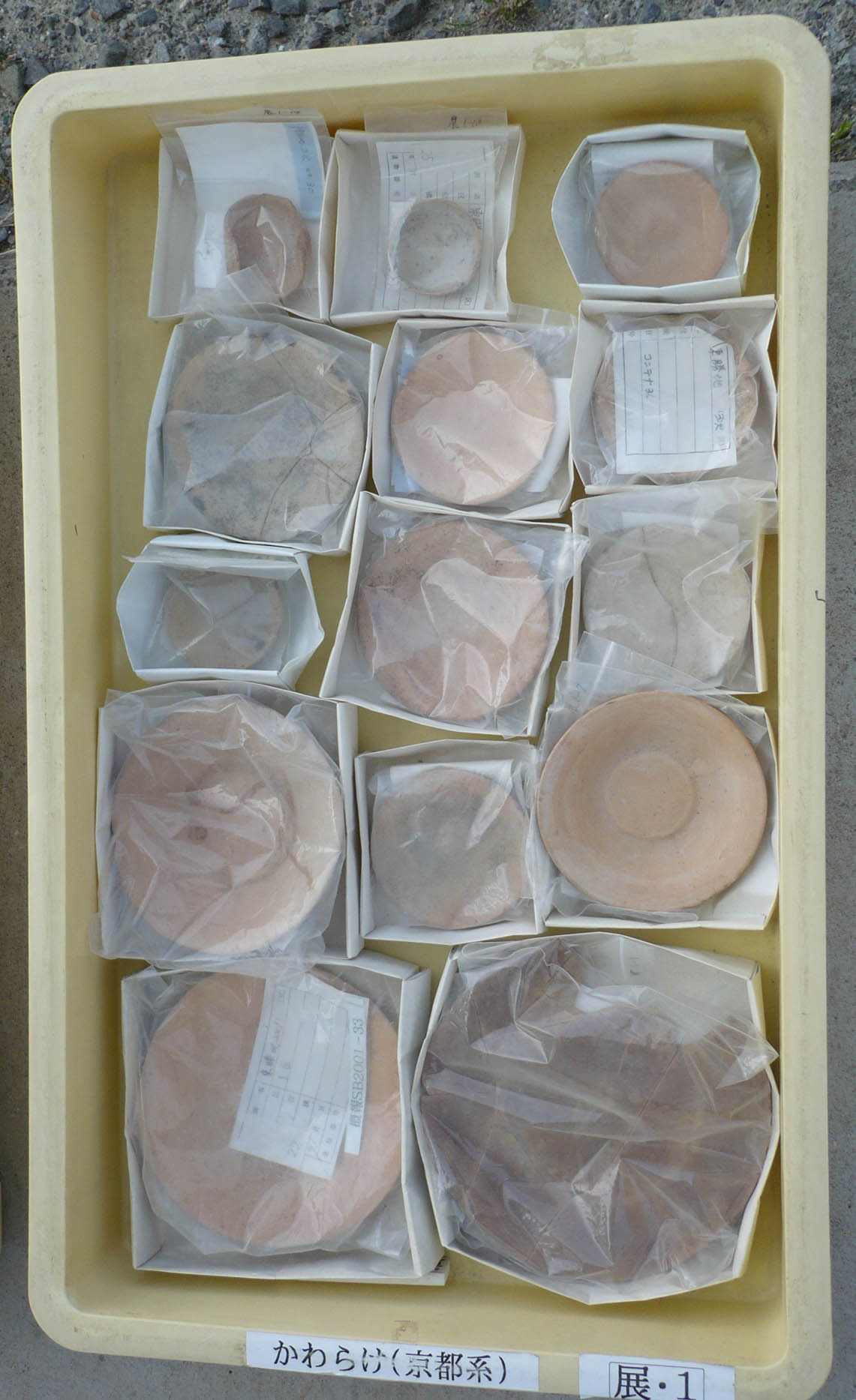
Artifacts found at the castle ruins

== See also ==
- List of Historic Sites of Japan (Tokushima)
