= Sogō Kazumasa =

- 十河 一存

Lord of Kawachi
- Succeeded by: Miyoshi Yoshitsugu

Personal details
- Born: 1532 Shōzui Castle, Awa Province (Tokushima)
- Died: April 2, 1561 (aged 29) Izumi Province
- Relations: Miyoshi Motonaga (father); Miyoshi Nagayoshi (brother); Miyoshi Yoshikata (brother); Atagi Fuyuyasu (brother); Miyoshi Yoshitsugu (son); Sogō Masayasu (adopted son)
- Nickname: Oni Sogō

Military service
- Allegiance: Miyoshi clan
- Unit: Sogō clan

Sogō Kazumasa (十河 一存; 1532 – April 2, 1561), other name Sogō Kazunari (十河 和也), fourth son of Miyoshi Motonaga, was a Japanese samurai of the Sengoku period who was a member of Miyoshi clan, daimyō of Kawachi Province.

Miyoshi Nagayoshi (eldest), Miyoshi Yukiyasu (second) and Atagi Fuyuyasu (third) are his elder brothers and Miyoshi Yoshitsugu is his son (later became Nagayoshi's adopted son). He latterly adopted Miyoshi Nagaharu (Yukiyasu's son) his child. He adopted Miyoshi Yoshikata's son, Masayasu.

His nickname was Oni Sogō as he was well known for his fighting skill and fierce like an Oni.
