= Akutagawayama Castle =

Castle ruins in Osaka, Japan

Akutayama Castle
- 芥川山城
- Takatsuki, Osaka Prefecture, Japan
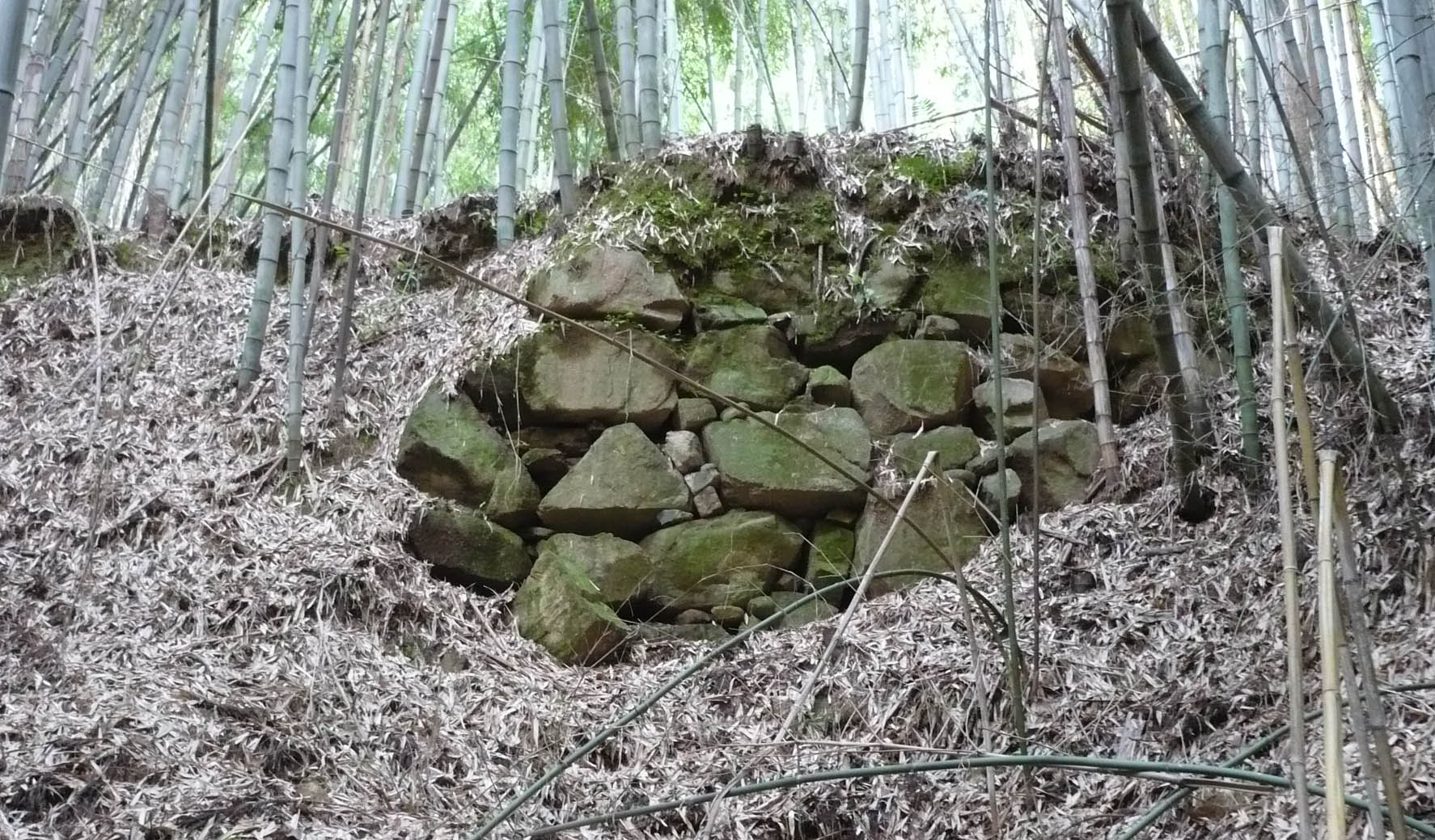
- Stone wall of the castle

Site information
- Type: mountaintop-style castle
- Owner: Miyoshi clan
- Condition: ruins

Location
- Coordinates: 34°52′51″N 135°35′17″E

Site history
- Built: 1515
- Built by: Hosokawa Takakuni
- Materials: Stone walls
- Demolished: 1571

Garrison information
- Past commanders: Miyoshi Nagayoshi, Wada Koremasa

Akutagawayama Castle (芥川山城, Akutagawayama-jō) was a Sengoku period mountain-top castle in Takatsuki, Osaka Prefecture, Japan. Located on a 182.6 meter mountain.

== History ==
Akutagawayama Castle was built by Hosokawa Takakuni but was later taken control of by the Miyoshi clan.

It was the original base of power for the Miyoshi clan before Miyoshi Nagayoshi moved to Iimoriyama Castle. After Nagayoshi left the castle, his son Miyoshi Yoshioki was in charge of the Castle.

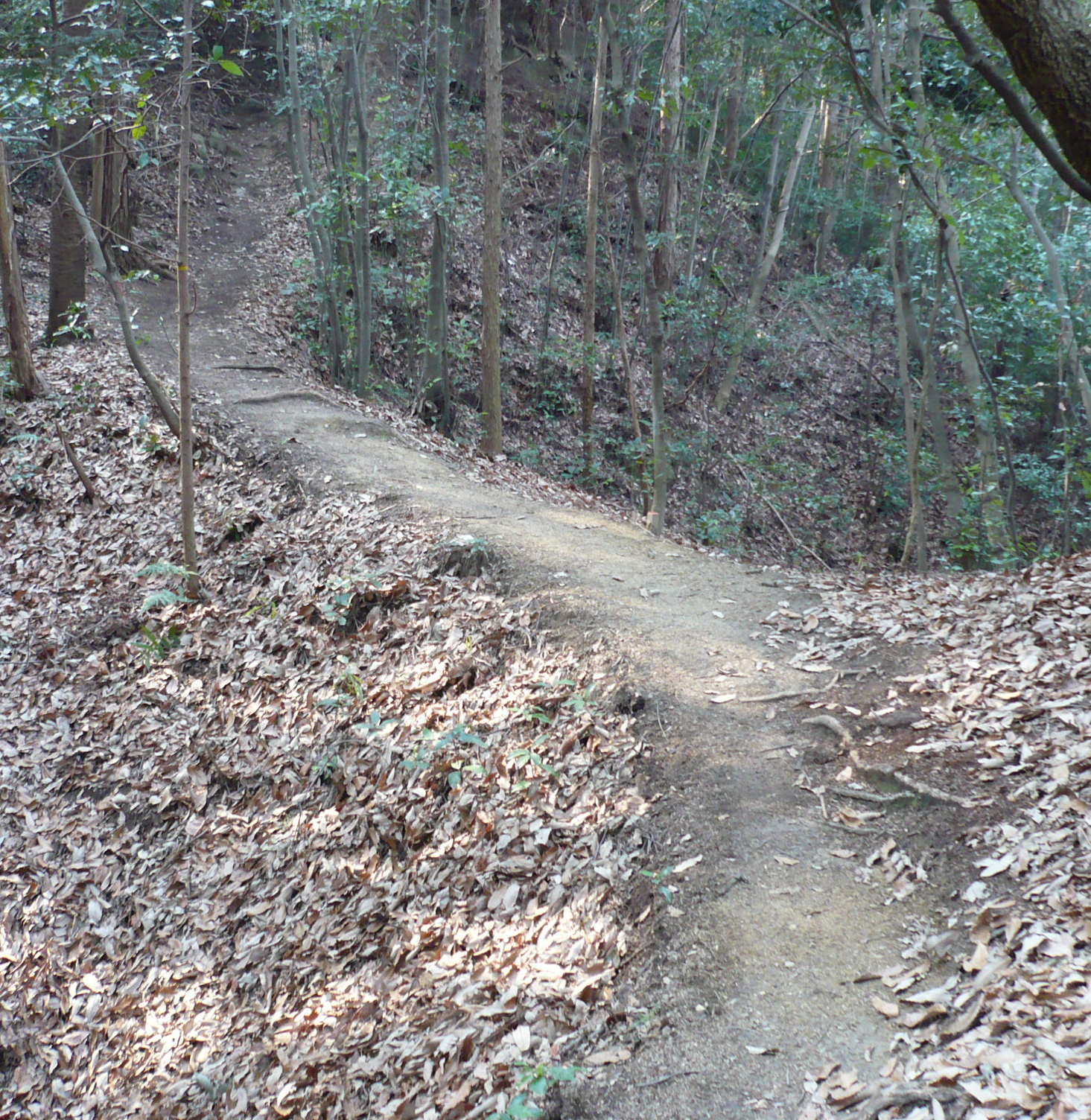
Eathen bridge of the castle

== Literature ==
- De Lange, William (2021). An Encyclopedia of Japanese Castles. Groningen: Toyo Press. pp. 600 pages. ISBN 978-9492722300.

== Preservation ==
The castle is now only ruins, with some stone walls, moats and Dobashi (earthen bridges).

The castle was listed as one of the Continued Top 100 Japanese Castles in 2017.

== Access ==
The castle ruins can be reached by bus from the Takatsuki Station.
