= Sogō Masayasu =

Japanese samurai

- 十河 存保

Lord of Shōzui Castle
- In office 1562–1587
- Preceded by: Miyoshi Yoshikata

Personal details
- Born: 1554 Shōzui Castle
- Died: 20 January 1587 (aged 32–33) Battle of Hetsugigawa, Bungo Province
- Relations: Miyoshi Yoshikata (father); Sogō Kazumasa (adoptive father)

Military service
- Allegiance: Miyoshi clan Toyotomi clan
- Rank: Daimyo
- Unit: Sogō clan
- Commands: Shōzui Castle
- Battles/wars: Battle of Nakatomigawa (1582); Invasion of Shikoku (1585); Battle of Hetsugigawa (1587)

Sogō Masayasu (十河存保; 1554 – 1587) was a Japanese samurai of the Sengoku period. He was second son of Miyoshi Yoshikata who was adopted by Sogō Kazumasa from the Sogō clan.

In 1582, Masayasu was defeated by Chōsokabe Motochika`s large army during the battle of Nakatomigawa, abandoned Shōzui Castle and asked Toyotomi Hideyoshi for help.

In 1585, he participated in Hideyoshi's successful campaign in Shikoku against Chosokabe clan.

In 1587, He died during the Kyushu campaign against the Shimazu clan as a result of Sengoku Hidehisa`s reckless actions at the battle of Hetsugigawa.
