= Atagi Nobuyasu =

Japanese samurai

- Born: 1549
- Died: 1578 (aged 28–29)

Atagi Nobuyasu (安宅 信康, 1549–1578) was the son of Atagi Fuyuyasu. He was a Japanese samurai of the Sengoku period. He was the nephew of Miyoshi Nagayoshi and was a naval commander of the Miyoshi clan.
