= Miyoshi Nagayoshi =

Japanese samurai (1522–1564)

- 三好 長慶
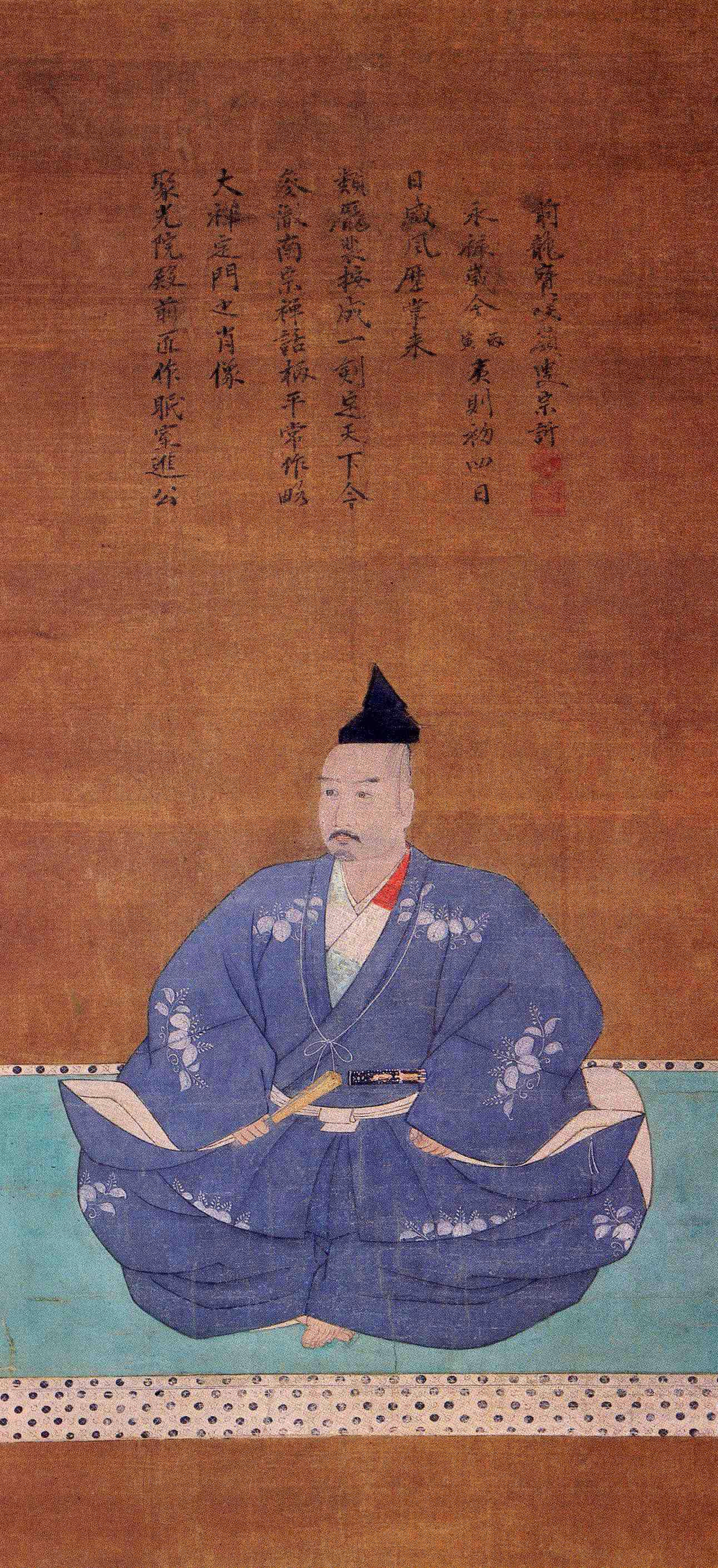

Head of Miyoshi clan
- In office 1549–1564
- Succeeded by: Miyoshi Yoshitsugu

Personal details
- Born: 1522 Yamashiro Province, Japan
- Died: July 4, 1564 (aged 42) Kawachi Province, Japan
- Spouse: Hatano Tanemichi's daughter
- Relations: Miyoshi Yoshikata (brother); Atagi Fuyuyasu (brother); Sogō Kazumasa (brother); Miyoshi Yoshitsugu (adopted son)
- Children: Miyoshi Yoshioki
- Parents: Miyoshi Motonaga (father); Unknown (mother)

Military service
- Allegiance: Miyoshi clan
- Rank: Daimyo (Lord)
- Battles/wars: Battle of Kyōkōji; Many others

Miyoshi Nagayoshi (三好 長慶; March 10, 1522 – August 10, 1564), or Miyoshi Choukei, the eldest son of Miyoshi Motonaga, was a Japanese samurai and daimyō who ruled seven provinces in Kansai. He was considered the most powerful figure during the Sengoku period before the rise of Oda Nobunaga, as Nagayoshi controlled the central government of the Shogunate.

Nagayoshi held the court titles of Shūri-dayū (修理太夫) and Chikuzen no Kami (筑前守). During his tenure, the Miyoshi clan would experience a great rise of power, and engage in a protracted military campaign against its rivals, the Rokkaku clan and the Hosokawa clan, while also engaging in conflict against Ashikaga Yoshiteru, the Shogun.

Nagayoshi was most known for his role in the political strife at Kyoto in the mid-16th century. Under his leadership, the Miyoshi clan was considered to be at the greatest extent of their power in history.

== Biography ==
Miyoshi Nagayoshi was born in 1522 to Miyoshi Motonaga. After his coming-of-age ceremony, Nagayoshi took the name Magojiro Toshinaga and was made governor of Iga. (Note: However, in the November 1536 edition of the Rokuen Nichiroku (Diary of the Rokuen Diary), he is recorded as Senkuma, so it seems that he was still known by his childhood name until he was 15 years old.)

In March 1536, Nagayoshi became a commander under Hosokawa Harumoto. He attacked the rebels in Nakajima in Settsu, which was led by Hosokawa Harukuni and the Hongan-ji Temple militant faction leader Shimotsuke Yorimori. However, Nagayoshi was defeated in this battle and fled to Nagamasa Kizawa. On July 29, with the support of Miyoshi Nagamasa and Miyoshi Masanaga, he attacked Nakajima and annihilated the rebel forces.

In 1538, Miyoshi Masanaga began to take control of Kyoto after Takahata Naganobu left Kyoto. However, Nagayoshi was dissatisfied with the fact that his father's former residence in Kyoto had been taken up by the shogun. On January 14, 1539, Nagayoshi, who was in Koshimizu Castle in Settsu Province, went to Kyoto, and accompanied Hosokawa Harumoto to the shogunate. (Note: Modern Japan historian Takahiro Babe claims that at this time there was a discussion about Masanaga's control of Kyoto, and that the shogunate was not happy with Masanaga's imposition. As a result, it is confirmed that Masanaga was in seclusion in Tanba Province in April 1539.) During the 1530s, a conflict between Nagayoshi and Masanaga is said to have been due to Masanaga's control of Kyoto and the extent of Masanaga's influence over Harumoto after the deaths of Katsukuken Shūsō and Kizō Nagamasa. The poor relationship with Masanaga extended to colleagues of Nagayoshi, such as Takabatake Naganobu and Yanagimoto Mototoshi, who also resented the influence of Masanaga.

=== Rise to power ===
In 1539, the shogunate requested that Nagayoshi send troops to support Akamatsu Harumasa during his visit to Kyoto, and Nagayoshi's subordinate Miyoshi Tsunemori sent troops. In return, Nagayoshi asked to be appointed governor of the 17 manors of Kawachi Province (Kawachi jū nana-kasho) in June of the same year, and the shogunate agreed. (Note: it was previously believed that Masanaga and Nagayoshi were in conflict over the position of governor of the 17 manors in Kawachi Province. However, this was refuted by the research of Takahiro Babe. He argued that Nagayoshi was able to take up the position of governor of the 17 manors of Kawachi because the shogunate and Nagayoshi had become close, and it was not because the conflict between Nagayoshi and Masanaga. In addition, Nagayoshi had dispatched deputies to those 17 regions in Kawachi even before he requested the shogun to grant him the position. The entry for May 3, 1557, in the Tenmon Nikki chronicle, has stated, "Gensuke Yoshida, Miyoshi deputy to seventeen places," and it was previously assumed that this was a deputy for Miyoshi Masanaga. However, since Gensuke appears as a deputy for Nagayoshi the following year, it became clear that the Miyoshi in the Tenmon Nikki was Nagayoshi.) Nagayoshi then led his army to enter Kyoto for the first time.

In April, Nagayoshi chose Masanaga, who was in seclusion in Tanba Province, to go into Kyoto at the will of Hosokawa Harumoto. On July 14, peace talks broke down, and Nagayoshi and Masanaga engaged in a small battle near Myōshin-ji Temple. On the 28th, Nagayoshi, fearing that he would make an enemy of daimyo clans like the Rokkaku and Takeda, accepted the peace agreement and retreated from Yamazaki. In the end, he was not given the magistrate position to control the 17 Manors. In August, he entered Koshimizu Castle in Settsu. Until then, the heads of the Miyoshi clan had always based themselves in Awa, and there were cases where they would retreat to Shikoku and try to make a comeback when they found themselves in political or military difficulties in the Kinai region, but after Nagayoshi entered the castle, he never returned to Awa province for the rest of his life, and instead established Settsu as his new base. After this, Nagayoshi became the deputy governor of Settsu Province and began serving the shogunate. Even as a lesser vassal, the political power of Nagayoshi had grown to the point that he could command the shogun himself to lead the armies from Settsu, Kawachi, Hokuriku, and Ōmi Province to Kyoto, posing a threat to his true superior, Harumoto.

=== Conflict against Harumoto and the Shogun ===
On December 15, 1540, Nagayoshi married the daughter of Hatano Hidetada, the lord of Yakami Castle. Later, around September 1541, Nagayoshi changed his name from Toshinaga to Norinaga, and in June of that year, Nagayoshi independently collected coin taxes from Tsuga Manor in Ubara County, which prompted a protest from Harumoto, since Harumoto had placed his close aide, Iwa Michisuke, in charge of collecting taxes. However, Nagayoshi ignored this, and proceeded with tax collection in Shimo District of Settsu Province (Toshima District, Southern Kawabe District, Muko District, Ubara District, and Yabe District). This led to the taxes being collected twice, as Nagayoshi and Michisuke collected tax separately, which deepened Nagayoshi's conflict with Harumoto. However, Nagayoshi, who by now controlled Koshimizu Castle and Nishinomiya, the central city of Shimo District, gradually extended his power to the local lords and peasantry (Kokujin).

In 1541, Kizawa Nagamasa rebelled against Harumoto Hosokawa, travelled to Kyoto and pursued shogun Yoshiharu and Harumoto. The Shugodai (military governor) of Kawachi, Yusa Naganori, expelled Hatakeyama Masakuni, another Shugodai whom Nagamasa had supported, and welcomed his brother Hatakeyama Tanenaga, and declared his support for Nagayoshi. As a result, on March 17, 1542, Nagamasa fought against Nagamasa at Taiheiji in an attempt to attack Kawachi Takaya Castle. Nagamasa was defeated and killed by Naganori, who had been joined by reinforcements from Masanaga and Nagayoshi. As a result of this battle, the Kizawa clan, which had been in power in the Kinai region for the past ten years, fell, and the Nagayoshi's power increased even further. Nagayoshi also appointed Matsunaga Hisahide as commander of the Miyoshi army in the southern part of Yamashiro Province to subjugate the remnants of opposing forces in Yamato who were still struggling after the subjugation of Kizawa Nagamasa. In 1544, Wada Shingorō, Nagayoshi's vassal, was brutally executed due to accusations of adultery by being sawed alive, it is speculated that Yoshiharu and Harumoto orchestrated this to ruin Nagayoshi's reputation.

On July 21, 1547, in a battle at Shariji against Hosokawa Harumoto, an account from the Ashikaga Kiseiki chronicle states that Nagayoshi emerged triumphant in battle against Harumoto, where 900 of his pike armed soldiers inflicted hundred of casualties on Harumoto's troops. After Shogun Yoshiharu's defeat, and Harumoto's return to Kyoto, Sadayori mediated peace between Nagayoshi and Yusa Naganori. Nagayoshi subsequently took Naganori's daughter as his second wife.

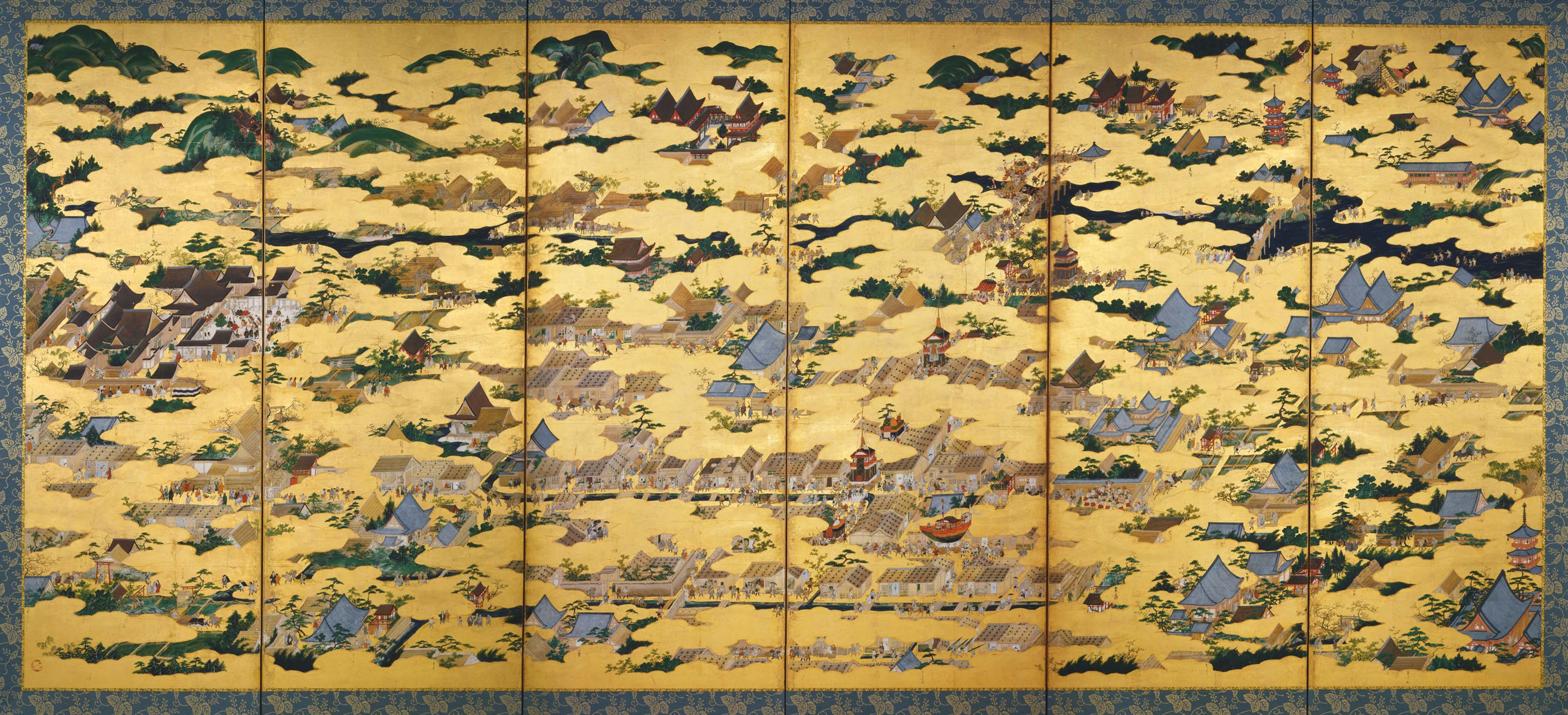
Painting of Kyoto in 16th century drawn by Kanō Eitoku

On Octer 12 1548, Nagayoshi asked Hosokawa Harumoto to pursue and kill Miyoshi Masanaga and his son, but his request was denied. So, on October 28, he joined forces with his former enemies, Hosokawa Ujitsuna and Yusa Naganori, and rebelled against Harumoto, sending troops to the 17 Manors of Kawachi, and besieging Enokami Castle, where Miyoshi Masakatsu was holed up. Nagayoshi's actions were dubbed the "Miyoshi Chikuzen no Kami (Nagayoshi) Treason" by Rokkaku Sadayori, who was allied to Harumoto. This conflict caused political turmoil in Kyoto as it also forced shogun Ashikaga Yoshiharu, who had returned to Kyoto just 2 years prior, to once again flee the city. (Note: Bardwell L. Smith recorded this happened in 1549)

In February 1549, Nagayoshi defeated the alliance of Hosokawa Harumoto, Miyoshi Masakatsu, and the Rokkaku clan, forcing them to retreat. Harumoto fled to Sakamoto in Omi Province with Ashikaga Yoshiharu and Yoshiteru. Nagayoshi supported Hosokawa Ujitsuna instead of Harumoto, and entered Kyoto on July 9. Six days later, on the 15th, he left Ujitsuna behind and returned to Settsu, where one of Harumoto's supporters, Itami Chikaoki, was. On June 24, Nagayoshi defeated Masanaga at the Battle of Eguchi in Settsu. This put Harumoto, who supported Masanaga, in a bad position, and Ashikaga Yoshiteru and Yoshiharu, accompanied by Harumoto, escaped from Kyoto along with Konoe Tanei and Kuga Harumichi on the 28th, seeking refuge in Omi Sakamoto, relying on Rokkaku Sadayori. On the 15th, Nagayoshi left Ujitsuna behind and returned to Settsu, where Itami Chikaoki was staying.

In March 1550, he captured the castle with the help of Yusa Naganori, and pacified Settsu Province. On November 21, Nagayoshi besieged Nagao Castle which was held by loyalists of Ashikaga Yoshiteru. The conflict progressed to small scale urban warfare. In late December, Nagayoshi finally took the castle, which was the last stronghold of the forces of Yoshiteru. This effectively led to the collapse of the Hosokawa government, and the creation of the "Miyoshi clan government".

=== Miyoshi clan domination ===
In March 1551, Nagayoshi faced two failed assassination attempts, planned by Yoshiteru. Later, On the night of March 7, Nagayoshi invited Ise Sadayoshi to the Kisshoin camp for a drinking party, and an arson incident occurred in attempt to harm Nagayoshi. On the 14th day of the same month, Nagayoshi was invited to the Ise residence and was attacked by a shogunate official, Shinji Kenko, and injured. The next morning, Miyoshi Masakatsu and Kozai Motonari, both working for Harumoto, set fire to the Higashiyama area. On May 5, Nagayoshi's ally and his wife's adoptive father, Yusa Naganori, was assassinated by the Jishu monk Shuami, who he revered. On July 14, Nagayoshi sent a large army of 40,000 soldiers gathered from Settsu, Awa, Izumi and other provinces under the command of Matsunaga Hisahide and his brother, Matsunaga Nagayori, to engage the army of Hosokawa Harumoto in the battle of Shokoku-ji Temple in Kamigyo Ward, Kyoto. After intense fighting that lasted until dawn of July 15, the Shokoku-ji Temple was set ablaze. As a result of this battle, Yoshiteru and Harumoto were unable to force their way into Kyoto, and Rokkaku Sadayori, who supported them, began peace negotiations.

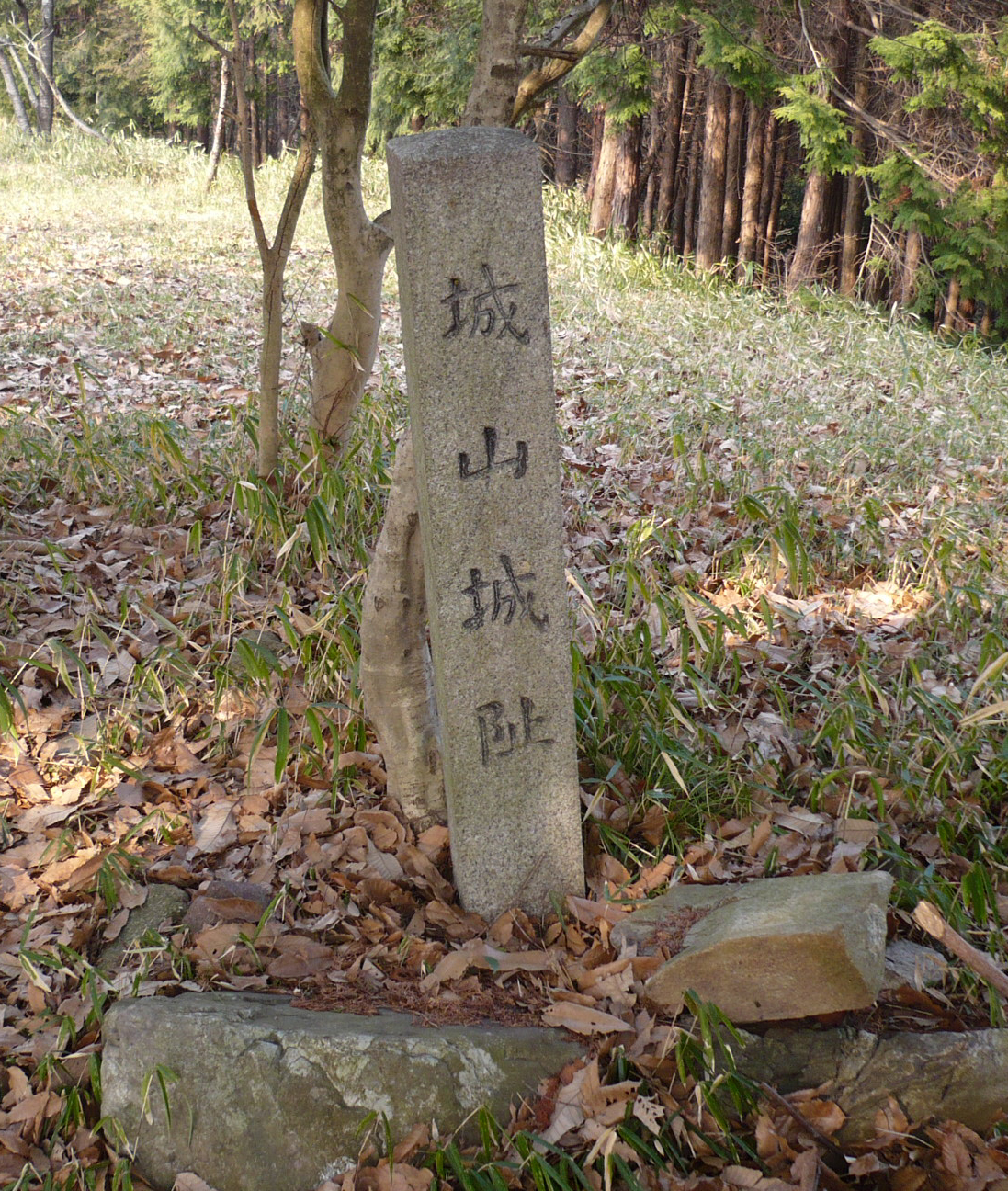
Stone monument at Mount Akutagawa Castle

In 1552, a peace agreement was reached on the condition that Ashikaga Yoshiteru would come to Kyoto. Yoshiteru arrived in Kyoto on January 28, and Nagayoshi came to Kyoto on February 26, where he was made a retainer of the Hosokawa clan, thus becoming a direct retainer of the shogunate instead of just a vassal of the Hosokawa clan. The shogunate was now headed by Yoshiteru, and Hosokawa Harumoto became Kanrei. However, the de facto power still rested with Nagayoshi.

In 1553, Nagayoshi worked to pacify his opposition such as the besieging of Mount Akutagawa Castle. However, On March 8, a conflict between Yoshiteru and Nagayoshi broke out as Yoshiteru captured Reizan Castle. On July 30, Yoshiteru personally took command of the troops. Despite the Shogun's presence, Harumoto's generals, fearing the loss of their troops, made no attempt to attack. On the Miyoshi side, the forces of Imamura Yoshimitsu attacked Ryozen Castle. After the fall of Ryozen Castle, Yoshiteru fled from Kyoto and lived in seclusion in Kutsuki for the next five years. In response to this, Nagayoshi announced an ultimatum that any nobles or samurai clans who decide to follow Yoshiteru will have their domains confiscated. This ultimatum led many to abandon Yoshiteru until only about 40 followers left to accompany him in Kutsuki. Meanwhile, after Akutagawa Magojuro's downfall, Nagayoshi moved into the Castle of Mount Akutagawa and made it his residence. While Koshimizu Castle was the political base of Shimogori, Akutagawa Castle had risen from a political base of Kamigori in Settsu to a central government of the Kinai region for the Hosokawa government during the reign of Takakuni and Harumoto, and Nagayoshi took over as its base. Later, Nagayoshi also negotiated with the Imperial Court and repaired the earthwalls of the Akutagawa castle, which followed with, the Miyoshi army was active in military activities, with the Matsunaga brothers dispatching troops to Tanba Province.

In 1554, the Miyoshi clan dispatched troops to Harima.

In June 1558, Yoshiteru, alongside Hosokawa Harumoto, Mitoshi Masakatsu, and Kozai Motonari, moved to recapture Kyoto. This led to a confrontation with Miyoshi forces at Shogunyama Castle, and the subsequent Battle of Kitashirakawa. The Miyoshi gained the advantage when Miyoshi Yasunaga, Miyoshi Sanekyu, Ataka Fuyuyasu, and Togawa Kazutoshi arrived, crossing the sea to Settsu. Rokkaku Yoshikata, realizing that he could not save Yoshiteru, attempted to make peace. Later, Nagayoshi once again banished Yoshiteru from Kyoto. On November 30, after the assassination of Yusa Naganori, Yasumi Munefusa (Naomasa), the new shugodai (military governor), banished Hatakeyama Takamasa to Kii Province. In response to this development, Nagayoshi ordered Matsunaga Hisahide to march to Izumi Province on May 29, 1559, but he was defeated by Yasumi's Negoro-shu, and Hisahide retreated to Settsu Province. Nagayoshi joined Hisahide and advanced to Kawachi on June 26 with an army of 20,000. On August 1, he took Takaya Castle, and on August 4, he took Iimoriyama Castle, restoring Takamasa as Kawachi shugo. He banished Munefusa to Yamato Province and appointed Yukawa Naomitsu, who had been in league with him, as shugodai. Hisahide also marched to Yamato on the pretext of pursuing Munefusa, and began his conquest of Yamato from Shigisan Castle, near the border between Kawachi and Yamato.

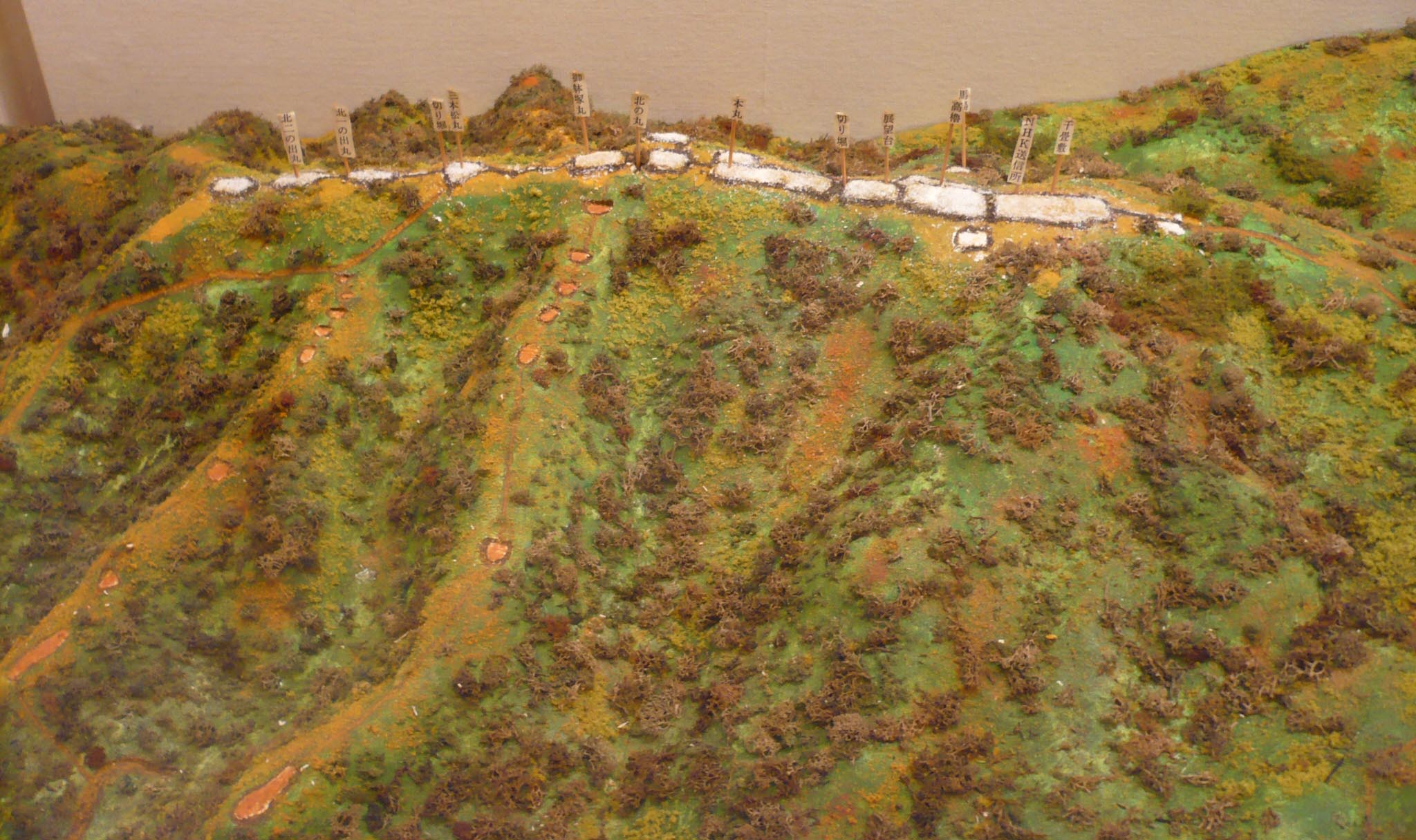
Model of Iimoriyama Castle

In 1560, Nagayoshi moved from Akutagawayama Castle to Iimoriyama Castle. He handed over Akutagawayama Castle to his son, Yoshinaga (Yoshioki). (Note: It is theorized the reason why Nagayoshi moved his castle to Imoriyama Castle was because it is close to Kyoto and by making it his base, it allows him to control the Osaka Plain effectively, and it also allows him to advance smoothly into Yamato Province. In addition, the Miyoshi clan's main territory was Awa Province, and if they used Imoriyama, they could return to their main territory, Awa, more quickly and easily via Sakai. However, Nagahara Keiji points out that Imoriyama was farther from Kyoto than Akutagawayama Castle. Nagahara points out that although the distance from Kyoto was greater, this change of base showed Nagayoshi's strong desire to advance and advance in the Yamato, Izumi, and Kawachi areas, and that Nagayoshi at that moment were too overconfident about the security of his position. In addition, according to Amano Tadayuki, there were two other possible bases, Takaya Castle and Imoriyama Castle, but while Takaya Castle was a political base for the entire Kawachi province, Imoriyama Castle was a political base that could exert political influence not only on Kawachi but also on Yamato and Yamashiro provinces, a total of three provinces, and therefore this was chosen as the base.) (Note: On the other hand, apart from the political perspective, there are also studies on the shift to Iimoriyama from Nagayoshi's spiritual perspective. Hiroshi Sugiyama points out that "at this time Nagayoshi's heart was turned to the literary world of Ginpu Nogetsu. Hiroo Tsurusaki and Shigeki Sudo also point out that "Nagayoshi's spirit shows a tendency towards hermitage Furthermore, Tadayuki Amano emphasizes that Nagayoshi's eldest son, Yoshioki, was given the character "chikuzen no kami" by the shogun and was appointed to the position of Chikuzen no kami, a position held by successive Miyoshi clan officials, and sees Nagayoshi's transfer of base and the issue of the Miyoshi clan's base as separate issues. He argues that with the transfer to Imoriyama, the headship of the Miyoshi clan was in effect passed from Nagayoshi to Yoshioki, and that at the same time, Akutagawayama Castle, the Miyoshi clan's base, was also inherited by Yoshioki, the new head of the family. Amano speculates that the reason for the succession to the family headship at this time was that the new head of the family, Yoshioki, wanted to build a new relationship with Shogun Yoshiteru in order to settle the long-standing conflict between him and the Miyoshi clan, and that he himself thought it would be better to maintain a certain distance from the authority of the Shogun)

On March 30, 1561, he welcomed Yoshiteru to his residence as Shogun, and on May 6, at Yoshiteru's recommendation, he made peace with Hosokawa Harumoto and welcomed him to Fumon-ji Temple in Settsu. His eldest son, Yoshioki, was also promoted to Junior Fourth Rank and a member of the "Gosoubanshu" that same year, and the preferential treatment of the Miyoshi family by the shogunate and imperial court continued. By this year, Nagayoshi's sphere of influence had expanded to 10 provinces, including Kawachi and Yamato, in addition to the eight provinces mentioned above, and he had also strengthened his control over two counties in eastern Iyo Province and southern Yamashiro. As a result, many daimyo, such as the Kono clan of Iyo Province, established friendly relations with Nagayoshi. During this year, Nagayoshi also met with Jesuit missionary Vilela and issued Shogun's privilege patent for him.

=== Further conflicts & final years ===
The death of Togawa Kazumasa (Nagayoshi's younger brother) in April 1561 marked the beginning of Nagayoshi's decline. This weakened Izumi's control (Izumi Kishiwada Castle was a retainer castle). Taking the advantage of this gap in July, Hatakeyama Takamasa and Rokkaku Yoshikata, with Hosokawa Harumoto's second son Haruyuki as their leader, raised an army and attacked the Miyoshi clan from the north and south. This continued until March 5, 1562, when Miyoshi Saneyasu was defeated and killed by Takamasa in the series of Battles of Kumeda.

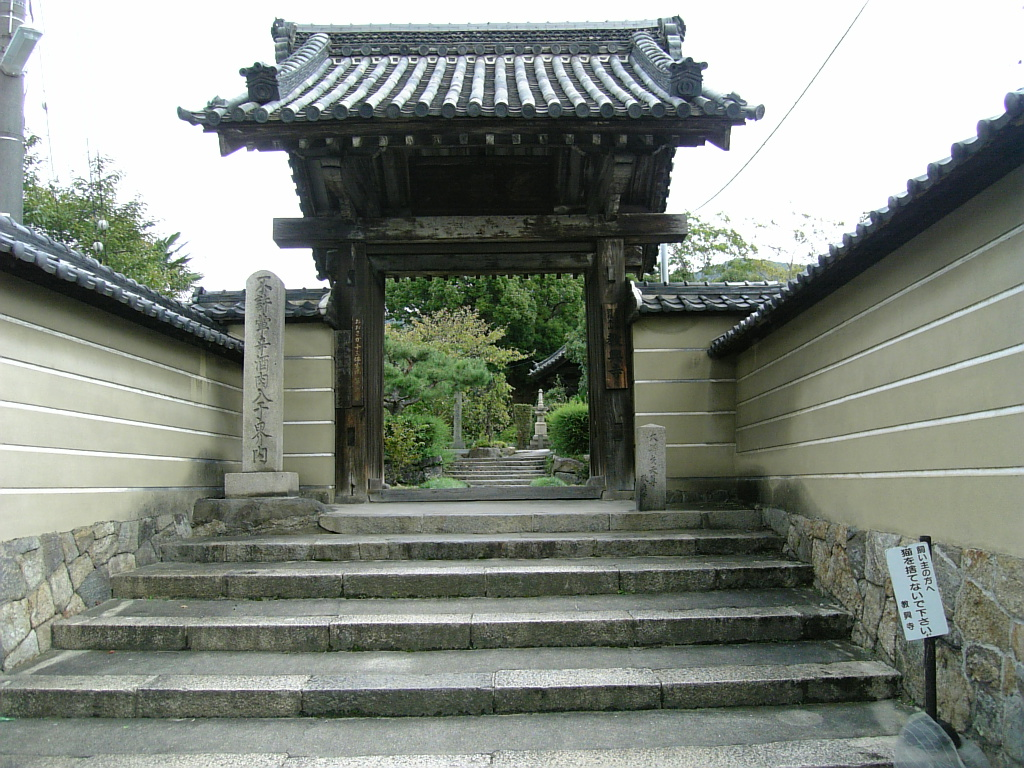
The gate of Kyokoji Temple

Simultaneously, a military engagement occurred between Nagayoshi and Hatakeyama Takamasa in Kumeda, Izumi Province (Kishiwada City), where Nagayoshi's older brother, Miyoshi Saneyasu, was killed and Takaya Castle fell to the Takamasa army. In response, on March 6, Nagayoshi's eldest son, Yoshioki, and Matsunaga Hisahide evacuated Shogun Ashikaga Yoshiteru from Kyoto to Iwashimizu Hachimangū Shrine. On the next day, the Rokkaku forces entered Kyoto. Nagayoshi's younger brother, Ataka Fuyuyasu, barricaded himself in Kishiwada Castle in Izumi for a while, before retreating. Nagayoshi himself barricaded his forces in Imoriyama Castle, as Yasumi Munefusa and the Negoro-ji Temple sect rebels besieged him. On May 20, 1562, the Battle of Kyōkōji occurred between the Hatakeyama forces surrounding Imoriyama Castle and the forces of Miyoshi Yoshioki and Yasunaga. At some point during this battle, the Matsura clan forces assisting Hatakeyama collapsed, and a fire broke out at their camp. Seeing this, Nagayoshi's charged out from Imoriyama Castle and attacked the Hatakeyama from both sides, with Yukawa Naomitsu being the first death, and the soldiers from Kishu and Negoro-ji rebels being completely annihilated. In the end, Nagayoshi was victorious, which effectively eliminated the Hatakeyama clan's influence from Yamato and Minami Kawachi, and solidified Miyoshi clan control over both provinces.

In August 1563, Nagayoshi, who had just lost his only heir, adopted Togo Kazumasa's son, his nephew Shigeari (Yoshitsugu). Shigeari, who should have succeeded the Togo clan after Kazumasa's death, was chosen as the successor because his birth mother was the daughter of Kujo Tanemichi, the regent. In December, Nagayoshi suffered another setback, Hosokawa Harumoto died of an illness. Shortly thereafter, Hosokawa Ujitsuna, the nominal lord of the Miyoshi clan, also died of an illness, leaving the Miyoshi clan regime without a Kanrei official to serve as their puppet in Kyoto.

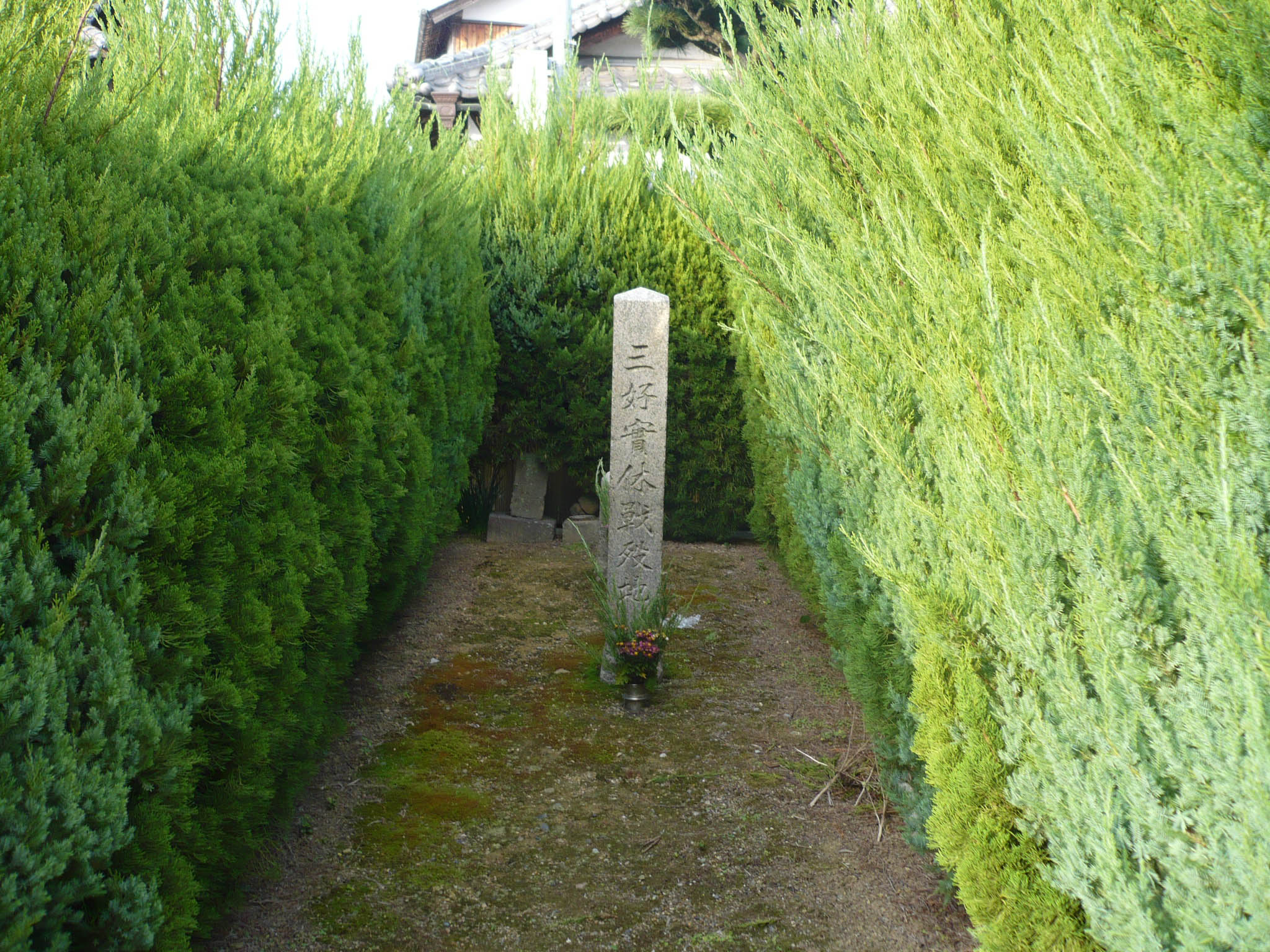
Stone marker at the site of the death of Nagayoshi

On May 9, 1564, Nagayoshi summoned his younger brother Ataka Fuyuyasu to his residence, Imoriyama Castle, and executed him. According to the chronical Ashikaga Kiseki he did this because he believed Matsunaga Hisahide's lie that Fuyuyasu wanted to usurp the leadership of the Miyoshi clan, but, due to the successive deaths of those around him, Nagayoshi had declined both physically and mentally. He regretted killing Fuyuyasu, and his illness only deteriorated further when he learned of Hisahide's lies. (Note: Amano and Shoichi suggested modern historians theory that the reason of Fuyuyasu execution was actually because Nagayoshi thought he would be an obstacle to Yoshitsugu's succession as head of the clan.) As a result, on June 22, Yoshitsugu, who had become the heir, went to Kyoto to inherit the family headship. Nagayoshi arrived at Iimoriyama Castle on the 23rd, and paid respects to Yoshiteru and the others. His illness appears to have become terminal by this time, and just 11 days later, on July 4, 1564, Nagayoshi succumbed to his illness. He was 42 years old.

Following his death, Nagayoshi was succeeded by his adopted son, Miyoshi Yoshitsugu (the son of Sogō Kazunari, his younger brother). During his life, it has never been confirmed whether or not Nagayoshi ever took a concubine. He had only one child, Yoshioki, who is thought to have been born to his first wife.

== Personal info ==
In retrospect for the assessment of Miyoshi Nagayoshi's leadership character, the strong connection between Nagayoshi with wealthy merchants and tea masters also somewhat contribute to him military, such as when Nagayoshi manage to escape from Hosokawa Ujitsuna's army with the help of citizens of Sakai. Nagayoshi also placed importance on his relationship with Kenhon-ji Temple and its merchants, and protected these temples and their followers, which strengthened his influence over the cities. Modern political theorists John Ferejohn and Frances McCall Rosenbluth further said that the achievement of Nagayoshi in 1547 against his former lord, Hosokawa Harumoto, were quite overlooked in the study of late Sengoku-period. They also saw how militarily Nagayoshi manage to maintain high standard and discipline of his soldiers were the key of his success.

On the other hand, other western historians such as George Elison and Bardwell L Smith also saw that Nagayoshi was not a solely a military man, as he also balanced his military achievements with his literary & cultural appropriations such as his promotions of Japanese tea ceremony masters and Renga poetries. However, historian Hiroshi Sugiyama also said that the later years of his life, Nagayoshi has lost his fierceness due to focus with Renga poetry activities. It was reported that Nagayoshi was holding a renga poetry gathering when his younger brother, Miyoshi Yoshikata. was killed in the Battle of Kumeda. When the news of Yoshikata's death reached him, Nagayoshi recited a poem that impressed everyone around him. (Note: However, Shoichi Nagae has questioned the veracity of this story, as it is only appeared from the later era story of Nagayoshi)

Shoichi Nagae also saw that the case of Nagayoshi's rise to power were though as a model of overthrowing the ruling class and old regimes, although apart from asserting his own interests, Nagayoshi is still a man of integrity who respects old traditions and order, based on how he often does not pursued and annihilate the losing enemies such as Ashikaga Yoshiteru. Hori Takashi quoted Nagae's comment and presented his own argument that the reason Nagayoshi did not pursue or attack Yoshiteru was that it was Nagayoshi's character to abhor excessive violence of war, by reckoning the history of the bloodsheds which suffered by the Miyoshi clan before him. Meanwhile, Akira Imatani also his own opinion that his generosity and tolerance in dealing with the "problematic Shogun" were actually his flaw of character in war condition. Imatani drew parallel here with how Nobunaga dealing against Ashikaga Yoshiaki with heavy hands and more severely was more effective and reasonable from military perspective than how Nagayoshi dealing with the opposition from Ashikaga Yoshiteru. In contrast with Imatani and Nagae, Thomas D. Conlan saw Nagayoshi as usurper and deem him as "brutal conqueror of Kyoto", while John Whitney Hall called him as "treacherous yet valorous" for his reign after his grand entrance on Kyoto in 1539. Nevertheless.

Allan Grapard thought that Nagayoshi has converted to Christianity by a Jesuit missionary, Gaspar Vilela. However, Sugiyama pointed out the historical records that he did not convert to Christian, although he tolerated the missionary activities and many of his vassals converted. Sugiyama suggested that Nagayoshi was just similar to Nobunaga, who is tolerant with new system of faiths and had huge curiosity for exotic things.

== Historical evaluations ==
=== Classical era evaluation ===
Historical evaluations of Miyoshi Nagayoshi tends to be fluctuates each periods change. There are references to Miyoshi Nagayoshi in books such as "Asakura Soteki Waki," "Koyo Gunkan," "Hojo Godaiki," and "Todai-ki.", which portray Nagayoshi in a favorable light, and "Hojo Godaiki" places him on the same level as warlords of the following Sengoku period such as Oda Nobunaga, Akechi Mitsuhide, and Toyotomi Hideyoshi.

However, mid-Edo period onwards were less generous to Nagayoshi as his image being denigrated. Historicities during this era began to relegate him as just a backdrop post-mortem character for the villainous and treacherous Matsunaga Hisahide, his top vassal. Furthermore, being compared to the so-called "Three Unifiers of Japan"(Oda Nobunaga, Toyotomi Hideyoshi, & Tokugawa Ieyasu), Nagayoshi's existence in historical records gradually fell into obscurity, and he was not even mentioned in Tanaka Yoshinari's historical works of "Ashikaga Jidai-shi" and "Oda Jidai-shi". For long time, the prevailed opinions of Miyoshi Nagayoshi assessments tends to judge him as a mediocre ruler who allowed Matsunaga Hisahide to monopolize the central government. For example, Rai San'yō has portrayed Nagayoshi as "old", "sick", and "ignorant", in his works.

For early modern period, historian Amano Tadayuki has pointed out the comment of Ryōtarō Shiba in his work, "kaidōwoyuku" about Nagayoshi, that Shiba described him as following: "The Miyoshi clan had a refined lifestyle, but they lacked ambition" Tadayuki stated that this view of Shiba were, unfortunately, the general public's assessment of that time about Nagayoshi and the rule of Miyoshi clan, as historians argued that this bias also because the rich history materials of more popular clans such as Takeda clan, Hōjō clan, and Mōri clan, in comparison with the Miyoshi clan and their lords which only possessed very few historical documents about their clan, although documents issued by Nagayoshi's vassals, such as Okonogi Munekuni, remain in a fair number of places, mainly temples and shrines in Kyoto.

Furthermore, Nagayoshi was always compared to the "innovative" and "progressive style" of Oda Nobunaga reign, and is labeled as an old guard politician who is too conservative and cannot adapt to the rapid political changes and upheavals.

=== Modern historians evaluation ===
Modern history researchers reevaluate and challenged the negative and obscure assessments of Nagayoshi in Edo period, Furthermore, Amano also stated that such assessments of Nagayoshi's "weak character" were completely inappropriate, based on a lack of understanding of the common sense of the Sengoku (Warring states) period. Modern reevaluators such as Akira Imatani, Amano Tadayuki, or Yamada Yasuhiro published several books on the Miyoshi government and the final period of the Muromachi shogunate, which had close ties to it, has renewed the academic interests to research further about the topic of Nagayoshi and the Miyoshi clan reign before Nobunaga.

Thus, modern era Japanese historians recently concluded that Miyoshi Nagayoshi was actually a capable Sengoku period leader, with some kind of "proto-Nobunaga" characteristic as he implemented several policies which were though as innovative during his time. Like Oda Nobunaga, Nagayoshi had his eye on the economic power of Sakai, as the wealth of the city economy and lucrative trades of the city has allowed him to easily obtain huge military expenses and military supplies. Nagayoshi also had connections with local samurai in the Hosokawa domain area since his great-grandfather Miyoshi Yukinaga and his father Motonaga, and the military power of Shikoku, ruled by his capable younger brothers, especially the powerful navy, and the excellent personal talent of Nagayoshi added to the military power of the Miyoshi army at its peak. In addition, the Miyoshi family's sense of kinship had been strong since Awa was called Ogasawara, and therefore during the time of Nagayoshi, his younger brothers firm defense of Awa enabled him to advance into other regions.

In fact, the so-called Miyoshi Government (Miyoshi-seiken) that run by Nagayoshi from 1549 to 1568 which controlled the central government of both Imperial court and Shogunate was viewed by Amano as pioneer of a unified government that preceded the Nobunaga unification. The only difference was, while the Miyoshi government kept the existence of Shogunate administrations as their puppet and controlling the extents of ceremonial orders and bureaucracy from behind, Nobunaga was simply disband the Shogunate and replace them with his own administration. Regarding the rise of Miyoshi clan, Takahiro Babe has added his own assessment it was also due to the lack of traditional order of the central government which supposedly fill by the Hosokawa clan, which represent the old regime of the central government.

== Family ==
- Father: Miyoshi Motonaga
- Mother: Unknown
- Siblings:
  - Miyoshi Yoshikata
  - Atagi Fuyuyasu
  - Sogō Kazumasa
- Wives
  - Hatano Tanemichi's daughter
- Children
  - Miyoshi Yoshioki

== Appendix ==
=== Bibliography ===
- Amano, Tadayuki (2010). 戦国期三好政権の研究 [Research on the Miyoshi government during the Sengoku period] (in Japanese). 清文堂出版. pp. 344–345.
- Amano, Tadayuki (2014). 三好長慶 諸人之を仰ぐこと北斗泰山 [Miyoshi Nagayoshi: People look up to him as Mount Taizo of the North Star] (in Japanese). ミネルヴァ書房. ISBN 978-4-623-07072-5.
- Amano, Tadayuki (2015). 増補版 戦国期三好政権の研究 [Research on the Miyoshi Government in the Sengoku Period, Expanded Edition] (in Japanese). 清文堂. ISBN 978-4-7924-1039-1.
- Conlan, Thomas D. (2024). Kings in All But Name: The Lost History of Ouchi Rule in Japan, 1350-1569. Oxford University Press. p. 333. ISBN 978-0197677339.
- Elison, George; Smith, Bardwell L., eds. (2021). Warlords, Artists and Commoners: Japan in the Sixteenth Century. University of Hawaii Press. p. 47. ISBN 978-0824844929.
- Enohara, Masaharu; Shimizu, Katsuyuki (2017). 室町幕府将軍列伝 [Biographies of the Shoguns of the Muromachi Shogunate] (in Japanese). 戎光祥出版.
- Ferejohn, John; Rosenbluth, Frances McCall (2010). War and State Building in Medieval Japan. Stanford University Press. pp. 149, 170 glossary. ISBN 9780804774314.
- Grapard, Allan (2023). The Protocol of the Gods: A Study of the Kasuga Cult in Japanese History. University of California Press. p. 241. ISBN 978-0520910362.
- Hall, John Whitney (1991). The Cambridge History of Japan, Volume 4 (reprint). Cambridge University Press. p. 319. ISBN 0521223555.
- Iimoriyama jo to Miyoshi Nagayoshi(Iimoriyama Castle and Miyoshi Nagayoshi) 『飯盛山城と三好長慶』 仁木宏,中井均,中西裕樹 (戎光祥出版 2015) ISBN 4864031770
- Imatani, Akira (2007). 戦国三好一族 天下に号令した戦国大名. MC新書. 洋泉社. ISBN 978-4-86248-135-1.
- Imatani, Akira; Amano, Tadayuki (2013). 三好長慶 [Nagayoshi Miyoshi]. 宮帯出版社. ISBN 978-4-86366-902-4.
- Katsuhiko, Fukushima (2009). 戦争の日本史 [Japanese War History]. 畿内・近国の戦国合戦. Vol. 11. 吉川弘文館.
- Masashi, Kuno (2017). 足利義昭と織田信長 [Ashikaga Yoshiaki and Oda Nobunaga]. 中世武士選書40. 戒光祥出版. ISBN 978-4864032599.
- Miyoshi Nagayoshi 『三好長慶』 人物文庫 (学陽書房2010) Tokunaga Shinichirō ISBN 4313752609
- Otani, Toshiaki (2015), "文献史料からみた私部城", in 交野市 教育委員会 (ed.), 私部城跡発掘調査報告 [Excavation report of Otani Castle ruins], 交野市教育委員会, doi:10.24484/sitereports.17362
- Shigemi, Okazaki (2008). 新約・名将言行録 [New Testament: Records of Famous Generals' Words and Deeds]. PHP新書. Translated by Nisohachi Hyōdō (兵頭二十八). pp. 275–276. ISBN 978-4-569-70266-7.
- Shoichi, Nagae (1968). 三好長慶. 人物叢書. 吉川弘文館. ISBN 978-4-642-05154-5.
- Shoichi, Nagae (1989). 三好長慶. 人物叢書 (新装版 ed.). 吉川弘文館. pp. 116–122. ISBN 978-4-642-05154-5.
- Sugiyama, Hiroshi (1971). 日本の歴史 11．戦国大名 [History of Japan 11. Sengoku Daimyo]. 中公バックス. 中央公論新社. pp. 276–278.
- Tadayuki, Amano (2021). 三好一族―戦国最初の「天下人」 [The Miyoshi Clan: The First "Ruler of Japan" of the Warring States Period]. 中公新書 2665. 中央公論新社. ISBN 978-4-12-102665-1.（electronic version available）
- Yamada, Yasuhiro (2019). 足利義輝・義昭 天下諸侍、御主に候 [Ashikaga Yoshiteru and Yoshiaki: Lords of the Samurai Under Heaven]. ミネルヴァ日本評伝選. ミネルヴァ書房. ISBN 978-4623087914.
- Yumikura, Hiroshi (2006), 中世後期畿内近国守護の研究 [Study on the shugo of Kinai and Kinki Provinces in the late Middle Ages], 清文堂出版, ISBN 4-7924-0616-1
