= Atagi Fuyuyasu =

Japanese samurai

- 安宅 冬康
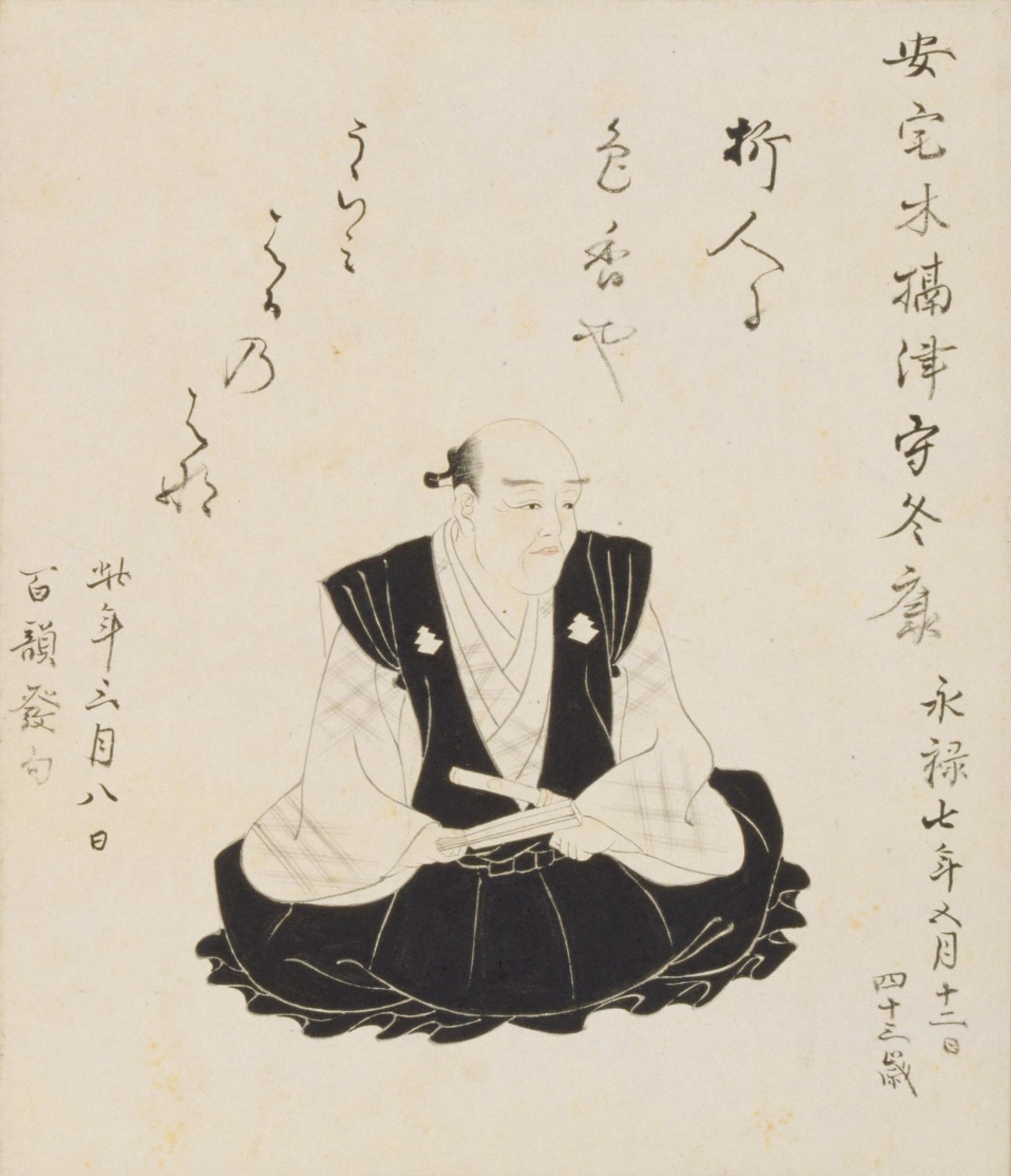
- Born: 1528
- Died: July 17, 1564 (aged 35–36)
- Children: Atagi Nobuyasu
- Relatives: Miyoshi Motonaga (father); Miyoshi Nagayoshi (brother); Miyoshi Yoshikata (brother); Sogō Kazumasa (brother)
- Military career
- Allegiance: Miyoshi clan

Atagi Fuyuyasu (安宅 冬康; 1528 – June 17, 1564), third son of Miyoshi Motonaga, brothers of Miyoshi Nagayoshi, Miyoshi Yukiyasu and Sogō Kazunari, was a Japanese samurai who lived in the Sengoku period. He was active in the Awaji region, and was also known as a poet.

He had a son named Atagi Nobuyasu. He was also known as Waka poet.

He was purged by his brother Miyoshi Nagayoshi in 1564.
