= Kawachi Province =

Former province of Japan

Map of Japanese provinces (1868) with Kawachi Province highlighted.

Kawachi Province (河内国, Kawachi no Kuni; Japanese pronunciation: [kä́.β̞ä̀.c̟͡ɕì (nò̞ kɯ̈̀.ɲ̟ì)]) was a province of Japan in the eastern part of modern Osaka Prefecture. It originally held the southwestern area that was split off into Izumi Province. It was also known as Kashū (河州).

== Geography ==
The area was radically different in the past, with Kawachi Bay and lake dominating the area over what is now land. That the became the plains in the west of the province was in part due to the sediment flowing from the Yodo and Yamato Rivers.

== Chiku ==
Kawachi was divided into three counties (地区, chiku): northern (北河内, Kita Kawachi), central (中河内, Naka Kawachi), and southern (南河内, Minami Kawachi).

- The northern county comprised the modern Hirakata, Neyagawa, Kadoma, Moriguchi, Shijōnawate, Daitō, and Katano, Osaka areas.
- The central county comprised the modern Higashiōsaka, Yao, and Kashiwara, Osaka areas.
- The southern county comprised the modern Sakai's eastern part (all of Higashi-ku and Mihara-ku, and part of Kita-ku), Matsubara, Habikino, Fujiidera, Tondabayashi, Kawachinagano, Ōsakasayama, and Minamikawachi District areas.

== Development ==
Kawachi province was established in the 7th century. On 11 May 716, the Ōtori, Izumi, and Hine districts were split off to form Izumi Province (和泉監, Izumi-gen). In December 720, the Katashimo (堅下郡, Katashimo-gun) and Katakami (堅上郡, Katakami-gun) districts were combined to become Ōagata (大縣郡, Ōagata-gun). On 15 September 740, Izumi Province was merged back in. On 30 May 757, that area was again separated to form Izumi Province (this time with the normal kuni designation).

Under Dōkyō's administration, Yuge-no-Miya (由義宮) was established, taking the name of Nishi-no-Miyako (西京, "Western Capital"); moreover, in 769 the office of Kawachi kokushi was abolished, and the special administration structure of Kawachi shiki (河内職) was established. With the downfall of Dōkyō, the prior system was restored the following year.

== Capital ==
The provincial capital was in Shiki District, which is believed to have been at Kouiseki (国府遺跡, "provincial capital ruins") in Fujiidera, but this is not known for certain. It may have been moved during the Nara period (both locations would still be within modern Fujiidera). However, in the Shūgaishō, the capital was in Ōagata District. In the Setsuyōshū, Tanboku District was mentioned as the seat.

It seems that there was no office of shugo before the Jōkyū War. It is unknown where the original shugo's residence was, but afterwards, it transferred to the Tannan, Furuichi, Wakae, and Takaya areas.

== Temples ==
A provincial temple for monks was constructed in the Tenpyō era; they were at modern Kokubuhiganjō in Kashiwara, but they went out of use in sometime around the Nanboku-chō period. Similarly, one for nuns was also near the same place, but it seems that it was in ruin by the Heian period.

Hiraoka Shrine was designated as the chief Shinto shrine (ichinomiya) of Kawachi Province. The shrine is located in Higashiōsaka. In addition, Katano Shrine in Hirakata, is labelled the "Primary Shrine of Kashū" (河州一ノ宮, Kashū Ichi-no-Miya), but this may be a mixup where what was once the primary shrine for the Katano township was confused for the primary shrine of Kawachi.

The secondary shrine is said to have been Onji Shrine. However, just having the second most influence in Kawachi Province does not necessarily mean it was a secondary shrine in the shrine system. That it is called the secondary shrine is also a recent innovation.

There were no lower-level shrines.

The sōja (Shinto) was Shiki-Agatanushi Shrine; there is a theory that this shrine was moved to where the sōja's land was, and another theory that it came to be the sōja due to its proximity to the capital.

== History ==
=== Ancient – Kamakura period ===
The province of Kawachi was once the power of the Mononobe clan; Kizuri in Higashiōsaka was, in ancient times, one of their strongholds.

Tsuboi in Habikino became a stronghold of the warrior family that was the Minamoto clan (i.e., the Kawachi Genji). The likes of Hachimantarō Yoshiie who made vassals out of the samurai of the eastern provinces, his father Minamoto no Yoriyoshi, and Yoshiyori's father Minamoto no Yorinobu's tomb of three generations is even now close to the Tsūhō-ji remains that was the Kawachi Genji's family temple. Minamoto no Yoritomo (who founded the Kamakura shogunate) was a descendant of these Kawachi Genji.

Near the end of the Kamakura period, Kusunoki Masashige and his household, being a powerful clan of southern Kawachi, rose up in defiance of the shogunate; barricaded in the Shimo Akasaka, Kami Akasaka, and Chihaya castles, he baffled the Kamakura shogunal armies. With the direct imperial rule of Kenmu, Kusunoki was appointed as both kokushi and shugo.

=== Muromachi period ===
The Nanboku-chō period arrived as Ashikaga Takauji opposed Emperor Go-Daigo, and Kawachi became a hotspot for battles; Kusunoki Masashige's eldest son Kusunoki Masatsura was killed in action at the battle of Shijō Nawate.

"After the death of Chikafusa the Southern Court moved from Anau to Amano in the province of Kawachi, making the Kongoji its headquarters."

With the advent of the Muromachi period, the post of Kawachi shugo fell to one of the three kanrei, of the Hatakeyama clan; Hatakeyama Mitsuie and Hatakeyama Mochikuni continued this, making what should have been a dynasty of sorts, but in dispute over Mochikuni's family headship, the adopted Hatakeyama Masanaga and the begotten Hatakeyama Yoshinari quarreled, and as Kawachi became the background for that feud, it fell to waste.

Masanaga was attacked at Shōgaku-ji (正覚寺; Kami-Shōgaku-ji, Hirano-ku, Osaka) by Hosokawa Masamoto and Hatakeyama Yoshitoyo, but his son Hisayoshi was in Kishū attempting to recoup for another attack; finally, they succeeded in making a comeback as the shugo of Kawachi and Kishū, and Hisayoshi's son Tanenaga ultimately managed to destroy Yoshihide of Yoshinari's line, once again consolidating the house of Hatakeyama. However, through all this, Kawachi had been the battleground, and had essentially been reduced to scorched earth.

=== Sengoku period ===
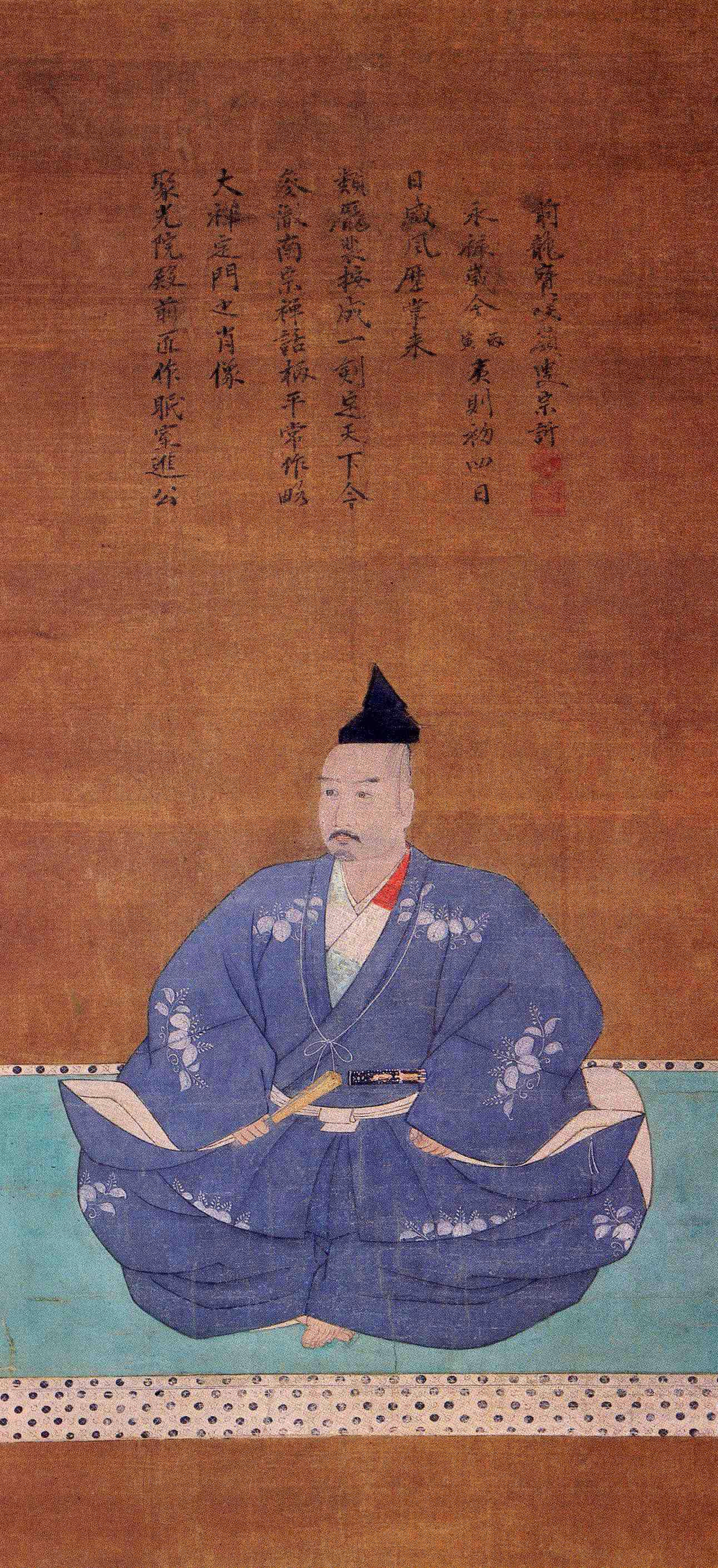
Portrait of Miyoshi Nagayoshi

By the Sengoku period, the consolidated Kawachi was the asset of Hatakeyama Tanenaga, but the real power was imbued in the shugodai, a title that passed into the hands of Yusa Naganori: the shugo came to be reduced to a mere figurehead. Moreover, the kanrei house of Hosokawa continued to face internal strife; in addition to the Hosokawa inheritance dispute between Takakuni, Sumimoto, and Sumiyuki, the son of Sumimoto (the victor of that conflict) Harumoto attacked and overthrew the shugodai in Sakai who played an active role in the Hosokawa clan's internal strife, Miyoshi Motonaga.

The bakufu, which was an asset for Harumoto, had been preserved, but Miyoshi's son Nagayoshi proceeded to the capital from Awa; while he accepting a wife from the shugodai of Kawachi who had the de facto power (Yusa Naganori) and received other such favors of power, in subordination to Harumoto, but not in subordination to the wishes of Harumoto, he played an active role in such things as attacking Kizawa Nagamasa in Takaida (in modern Kashiwara, Osaka).

However, being in opposition later on, Nagayoshi would fight his father's cousin in Harumoto's faction, Miyoshi Masanaga, in dispute over Kawachi Jū Nana Kasho at places like Enami Castle, going on to break down Harumoto's controlled political power; the shōgun was reduced to a figurehead and along with seizing the real power of the bakufu, he transferred the stronghold from Akutagawa Mountain Castle in Settsu to Iimori Mountain Castle in Kawachi (Shijōnawate, Osaka).

But even Nagayoshi had to pass away at the age of 42, and afterwards retainers were in conflict (the Miyoshi triumvirate and Matsunaga Hisahide), making a battleground of Kawachi and Yamato. The event that finally closed the period and these conflicts was Oda Nobunaga's procession to the capital.

=== Azuchi-Momoyama period ===
Upon his ascension to the capital, Oda Nobunaga gave the task of governing the northern half of Kawachi to Miyoshi Yoshitsugu, and that of the southern half to Hatakeyama Akitaka (his son-in-law). However, they both fell in the conflicts around the Genki era, and control of Kawachi fell to Oda's chief vassal Sakuma Nobumori. But even Nobumori would later be shunned and banished by Nobunaga.

When Oda died in the Incident at Honnō-ji, Hashiba Hideyoshi, who attacked Akechi Mitsuhide at the battle of Yamazaki, as a result of the Kiyosu Conference, came to control the province.

Hideyoshi came to rule all Japan, and when Osaka Castle was built, Wakae Castle, which had once been an important spot in Kawachi, became derelict.

After the death of Hideyoshi, the Battle of Sekigahara ensued, and Tokugawa Ieyasu became ruler of all Japan: the Sei-i Taishōgun; he opened his bakufu, but as Kawachi was Toyotomi Hideyori's fiefdom, it was not entered into the bakuhan taisei.

When Tokugawa Ieyasu and Toyotomi Hideyori had their showdown at the Siege of Osaka, Kawachi also became a battleground. This fight had a winter and a summer campaign, but since the winter campaign was a battle around Osaka Castle, Kawachi was not a war location then. The aspect of the summer campaign was completely turned about, and the outer moat of Osaka Castle was buried, leaving the castle exposed; the Osaka side judged a siege defense to be impossible, and intercepted Tokugawa's side going from Kyoto to Osaka in the field. Therefore, fights occurred at various places in Kawachi, it being between Kyoto and Osaka. The primary battles that developed were the Battle of Dōmyōji (Gotō Matabee vs. Date Masamune, Matsudaira Tadateru, and Mizuno Katsunari; Sanada Yukimura, Kitagawa Nobukatsu, and Susukida Kanesuke vs. Date Masamune, Matsudaira Tadateru, and Mizuno Katsunari) and the battle of Yao and Wakae (Kimura Shigenari vs. Ii Naotaka; Chōsokabe Morichika vs. Tōdō Takatora).

=== Edo period ===
In the Edo period, Kawachi was dotted with tenryō as well as hatamotos. As for daimyōs, there were only two: the Hōjō of Sayama Domain and the Takagi of Tannan Domain. In addition, the Inaba of Yodo Domain had many territories.

== Historical districts ==
- Osaka Prefecture
  - Asukabe District (安宿部郡)
  - Furuichi District (古市郡)
  - Ishikawa District (石川郡)
  - Katano District (交野郡)
  - Kawachi District (河内郡)
  - Matta District (茨田郡)
  - Nishigori District (錦部郡)
  - Ōgata District (大県郡)
  - Sasara District (讃良郡)
  - Shibukawa District (渋川郡)
  - Shiki District (志紀郡)
  - Tajihi District (丹比郡) - split into the following districts during the Heian period:
    - Tanboku District (丹北郡)
    - Tannan District (丹南郡)
    - Yakami District (八上郡)
  - Takayasu District (高安郡)
  - Wakae District (若江郡)

=== Meiji era reorganization ===
- Kitakawachi District (北河内郡) – merger of Katano, Matta and Sasara Districts; making the former Kawachi Province's northern portion a single district on April 1, 1896
- Nakakawachi District (中河内郡) – merger of Kawachi, Ōgata, Shibukawa, Takayasu, Tanboku and Wakae Districts, along with part of Shiki District (Mikimoto-mura); making the former Kawachi Province's central portion a single district on April 1, 1896
- Minamikawachi District (南河内郡) – merger of Asukabe, Furuichi, Ishikawa, Nishigori, Tannan and Yakami Districts, along with part of Shiki District (all but Mikimoto-mura); making the former Kawachi Province's southern portion a single district on April 1, 1896

== Kokushi ==
- 672, August – Kume
- 708, April – Ishikawa no Iwatari
- 724 – c. 749 – Kudara no Konikishi Kyōfuku (self-styled)
- 746, April – Ōtomo no Koshibi (dismissed)
- 760 – Yamato no Nagaoka
- 769, November – Fujiwara no Momokawa
- 790, April – Ōtomo no Otomaro
- 806, February – Kudara no Koniki Shikyōjin
- 817, July – Fujiwara no Otsugu
- 878, February – Abe no Fusakami

== Shugo ==
=== Kamakura bakufu ===
- 1221–? – Miura Yoshimura
- ?–1247 – Miura Yasumura
- 1280–? – Hōjō Hisatoki
- ?–1333 – someone from the Hōjō clan

=== Muromachi bakufu ===
- 1336–1347 – Hosokawa Akiuji
- 1347–1349 – Kō no Moroyasu
- 1349–1351 – Hatakeyama Kunikiyo
- 1352–1353 – Kō no Morihide
- 1359–1360 – Hatakeyama Kunikiyo
- 1369–1382 – Kusunoki Masanori
- 1382–1406 – Hatakeyama Motokuni
- 1406–1408 – Hatakeyama Mitsunori
- 1408–1433 – Hatakeyama Mitsuie
- 1433–1441 – Hatakeyama Mochikuni
- 1441 – Hatakeyama Mochinaga
- 1441–1455 – Hatakeyama Mochikuni
- 1455–1460 – Hatakeyama Yoshinari
- 1460–1467 – Hatakeyama Masanaga
- 1467 – Hatakeyama Yoshinari
- 1467–1493 – Hatakeyama Masanaga
- 1493–1499 – Hatakeyama Yoshitoyo
- 1499–1504 – Hatakeyama Yoshihide
- 1504–1507 – Hosokawa Masamoto
- 1507–1517 – Hatakeyama Hisayoshi
- 1517–1534 – Hatakeyama Tanenaga
- 1534–1538 – Hatakeyama Nagatsune
- 1538–1542 – Hatakeyama Ariuji / Hatakeyama Masakuni
- 1542–1545 – Hatakeyama Tanenaga
- 1545 – Hatakeyama Haruhiro
- 1545–1550 – Hatakeyama Masakuni
- 1550–1560 – Hatakeyama Takamasa
- 1568–1569 – Hatakeyama Takamasa
- 1568–1573 – Miyoshi Yoshitsugu
- 1569–1573 – Hatakeyama Akitaka

== Kawachi figures ==
Though Kawachi was a very small province, many important people in ancient and medieval Japan had to do with the area and the decisive moments in Japanese history that took place there or around it.

- Mononobe no Moriya – From the Mononobe clan powerful in ancient times, he was part of the anti-Buddhist faction, and defeated by the allied forces of Soga no Umako and Prince Shōtoku.
- Kudara no Konikishi clan – Descendants of the royal house of Baekje, and a noble family of ancient times based in Kawachi.
- Fujii clan – An ancient family originally from China based in Kawachi. Likely progenitors of Jing Zhencheng.

- Jing Zhencheng – A student who studied abroad in Tang. His grave marker was discovered in the suburbs of Chang'an (modern Xi'an).

- Takamuko clan – An ancient noble family of Kawachi that produced many diplomats and statesmen such as Takamuko no Kuromaro.
- Kawachi Imoji – A group of medieval metal-working experts based in Tannan District.
- Mizuhai clan – Bushi of Kawachi descended from a priest of Hiraoka Shrine (Kawachi's ichinomiya), and descendants of the Hiraoka Muraji.
- Kawachi Genji – A branch of the warrior clan Minamoto. They were based in Kawachi, and at their peak controlled the eastern samurai.

- Minamoto no Yorinobu – The commander who put down Taira no Tadatsune's Rebellion. Founder and leader of the Kawachi Genji.
- Minamoto no Yoriyoshi – The commander who overcame the Abe clan in the Zenkunen War. Second-generation leader of the Kawachi Genji.
- Minamoto no Yoshiie – A commander in the Zenkunen and Gosannen wars. Third-generation leader of the Kawachi Genji.
- Minamoto no Yoshitada – Fourth son of Yoshiie, kami of Kawachi, fourth-generation leader of the Kawachi Genji. Assassinated by his uncle Minamoto no Yoshimitsu.
- Minamoto no Yoshitoki – Sixth son of Yoshiie, defended the inherited land of the Minamoto clan. Progenitor of the Ishikawa clan, among others.

- Ishikawa clan – A line derived from Yoshitoki's third son Minamoto no Yoshimoto, taking its name from Ishikawa in Kawachi.
- Kawachi clan – Family name taken by Kawachi kami and such.
- Kusunoki clan – A local family of Kawachi, offshoot of the Tachibana clan through being anti-Shogunist.

- Kusunoki Masashige – General who fought against the Kamakura shogunate. For his loyalty towards the emperor, he earned the name "Dainankō".
- Kusunoki Masatsura – Son of Masashige. For succeeding his father in his efforts, he received the name "Shōnankō".
- Kusunoki Masanori – Successor of Masatsura.
- Kusunoki Masasue – Masashige's younger brother. Committed suicide with his brother at the battle of Minatogawa.

- Kainoshō clan – Offspring of Kusunoki Masasue; served the Hatakeyama and Tokugawa clans.
- Hatakeyama clan – Offshoot of the Ashikaga clan, and one of the three Kanrei; a notable family that produced many Kawachi Province shugo.

- Hatakeyama Mitsuie – Kawachi shugo and Muromachi shogunate kanrei.
- Hatakeyama Mochikuni – Son of Mitsuie; Kawachi shugo and Muromachi shogunate kanrei.
- Hatakeyama Masanaga – Nephew and adopted son of Mochikuni; Kawachi shugo and Muromachi shogunate kanrei. Died in dispute with the shogunate.
- Hatakeyama Hisayoshi – Son of Masanaga; Kawachi shugo.
- Hatakeyama Tanenaga – Son of Hisayoshi; Kawachi shugo but puppet of shugodai Yusa Naganori.
- Hatakeyama Takamasa – Younger brother of Tanenaga; Kawachi shugo and anti-Miyoshi vanguard.
- Hatakeyama Akitaka – Younger brother of Tanenaga; followed in Takamasa's footsteps but was defeated by the Yusa.
- Hatakeyama Yoshinari – True son of Mochikuni; Kawachi shugo and regarded as a great commander.
- Hatakeyama Yoshitoyo – Son of Yoshinari; though he defeated Masanaga in the Meiō Coup, he was defeated by Hisayoshi in a comeback.
- Hatakeyama Yoshihide – Son of Yoshitoyo.

- Hosokawa Katsumoto – Shugo of Settsu, Tanba, and Yamashiro among others. Also a kanrei.
- Hosokawa Masamoto – Son of Katsumoto and a kanrei.

- Hosokawa Sumimoto – Adopted son of Masamoto.
- Hosokawa Takakuni – Adopted son of Masamoto.
- Hosokawa Sumiyuki – Adopted son of Masamoto.

- Hosokawa Harumoto – Son of Sumimoto; kanrei. Political power collapsed when defeated by Miyoshi Nagayoshi.
- Hosokawa Ujitsuna – Takakuni's orphan. Shouldered the anti-Harumoto faction.
- Yusa Naganori – Shugodai of Kawachi. Seized the real power of the Hatakeyama and reduced them to a Sengoku daimyō.
- Miyoshi clan – Sengoku daimyō. Originally the shugo of Awa Province; became the lords of Iimori Mountain Castle in Kawachi.

- Miyoshi Nagayoshi – Hegemon; a commander that expanded power to Awa, Tosa, Iyo, Sanuki, Awaji, Harima, Settsu, Tanba, Yamashiro, Kawachi, and Yamato.
- Miyoshi Yoshitsugu – After the death of Nagayoshi, he inherited the family hardship, but the house of Miyoshi fell apart.
- Miyoshi Yasunaga – Nagayoshi's uncle. Lord of Takaya Castle.
- Miyoshi Masanaga – Grand-uncle of Nagayoshi.
- Miyoshi triumvirate – A triple alliance in the house of Miyoshi between Iwanari Tomomichi, Miyoshi Masayasu, and Miyoshi Nagayasu.

- Kizawa Nagamasa – A Sengoku daimyō who temporarily held Yamato and Kawachi.
- Toyotomi Hideyoshi – Shogun and ruler of all Japan who succeeded Oda Nobunaga.
- Toyotomi Hideyori – Son of Hideyoshi; supreme commander of the western army in the Siege of Osaka.
- Sanada Yukimura – Second son of Sanada Masayuki of the Shinshū Sanada. Took the Osaka side in the siege of Osaka and banished to Kudoyama.
- Gotō Mototsugu – Commander with long service; was a chief vassal of the Kuroda clan, but opposed Kuroda Nagamasa. On the Osaka side in the Siege of Osaka.
- Chōsokabe Morichika – Fourth son of Chōsokabe Motochika; after his father's death, he inherited the family responsibility and fought for the Toyotomi side at the Battle of Sekigahara and Siege of Osaka.
- Kimura Shigenari – A young talent of the Toyotomi side in opposition to the bakufu.
- Iijima Saburōemon – A peasant of Takaida in Kawachi Province who served Shigenari, he died in action at the Battle of Wakae.
- Yamaguchi Hirosada – Son of Yamaguchi Munenaga; a subordinate commander for Shigenari, and husband of Shigenari's younger sister; the vanguard at the Battle of Wakae, where he died in the intense fighting.
- Yasui Dōton – The man who dug (and whose name graces) Dōtonbori; may have also been born in Kawachi.
- Shuntokumaru – A man said to be from Takayasu District. The subject of various theatre productions.
- Naka Jinbee – The village headman who re-routed the Yamato River.

== See also ==
- Cotton – Kawachi cotton was popular from the early Edo period until before World War II; it was Kawachi's top industry.
- Kami of Kawachi – The kokushi of the province.
- List of provinces of ancient Japan
- Sayama Domain – Belonged to the Hōjō (descendants of Hōjō Sōun).
- Tannan Domain – Belonged to the Takagi clan.
- Yodo Domain – Belonged to the Inaba clan (into which Lady Kasuga was married).
