= Shikoku Saburo Bridge =

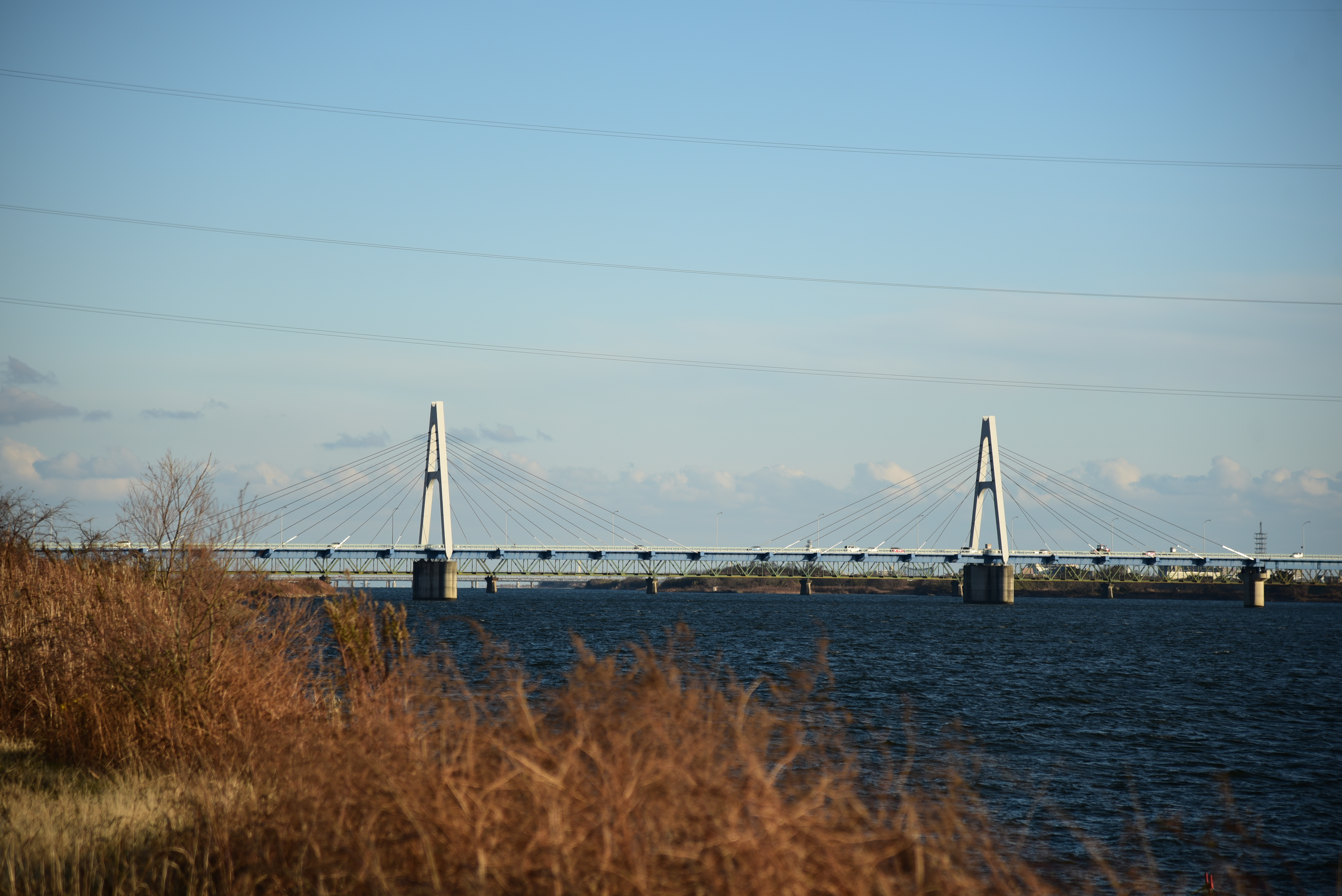
- Shikoku Saburo Bridge
- Coordinates: 34°06′14″N 134°31′04″E / 34.10389°N 134.51778°E
- Crosses: Yoshino River
- Locale: Tokushima Prefecture, Japan

Characteristics
- Total length: 910.5 metres
- Width: 14 metres

History
- Opened: 1998

The Shikoku Saburo Bridge (四国三郎橋) is a bridge in Tokushima Prefecture, Shikoku that spans the Yoshino River. It joins Ojin-cho on the north of the river to Fudouhigashi-cho on the south of the river. The bridge is 910.5 metres in length and 14 metres in width, with a two-lane highway running atop. The bridge was opened to the public in 1998.

The Yoshino River is regarded as one of the three great rivers in Japan; Saburo is a popular name for third-born sons in Japan.
