= Allan Grapard =

French historian

- Allan Georges Grapard
- Born: June 6, 1944 (age 82); Normandy, France
- Died: December 8, 2025 (aged 81); Hilo, Hawaii, United States
- Occupations: Historian, religious studies scholar
- Spouse: Carolyn Isono-Grapard
- Children: Cecile Grapard Retrosi, Pascal Grapard

Academic background
- Education: National Institute of Oriental Languages and Civilizations

Academic work
- Discipline: History, religious studies, Japanese studies
- Institutions: University of California, Santa Barbara
- Main interests: Shinto, Japanese Buddhism, history of Japan

Allan Georges Grapard (born June 6, 1944, Normandy, France; died December 8, 2025, Hilo, Hawaii, United States) was a French academic, historian and Japanologist.

== Early life ==
Grapard earned his Ph.D. at the National Institute of Oriental Languages and Civilizations in Paris.

== Career ==
In 1985, Grapard came to University of California, Santa Barbara as a visiting professor in Japanese religions; and in 1986, he was invited to join the faculty of the Religious Studies Department.

Today Grapard was Professor Emeritus of East Asian Languages and Cultural Studies (EALCS) at the same institute.

In the historiography of Japanese religions, he is known for developing innovative theoretical propositions:

- "Japanese religiosity is grounded in specific sites at which beliefs and practices were combined."
- "Japanese religiosity is neither Shinto nor Buddhist nor sectarian but is essentially combinative."
- "Those combinative systems which evolved in specific sites are related to institutions of power and, therefore, to political, social, and economic order, all of which are interrelated and embodied in rituals and institutions marking those sites."

== Selected works ==
In a statistical overview derived from writings by and about Allan Grapard, OCLC/WorldCat encompasses roughly 10 works in 10+ publications in 4 languages and 500+ library holdings.

- Japan's Ignored Cultural Revolution: the Separation of Shinto and Buddhist Divinities in Meiji (shimbutsu bunri) and a Case Study: Tonomine (1984)
- Kukai: la vérité finale des trois enseignements (1985)
- Voltaire and East Asia: a Few Reflections on the Nature of Humanism (1985)
- Lotus in the Mountain, Mountain in the Lotus: Rokugō kaizan Nimmon daibosatsu hongi (1986)
- The Protocol of the Gods: a Study of the Kasuga Cult in Japanese History (1992)
- The Shinto of Yoshida Kanetomo (1992)
- Mountain Mandalas: Shugendō in Kyushu (2016)

Articles

- "Institution, Ritual, and Ideology: The Twenty-Two Shrine-Temple Multiplexes of Heian Japan." History of Religions, 27 (1988): 246-269
