= Miyoshi Yoshikata =

- 三好 義賢
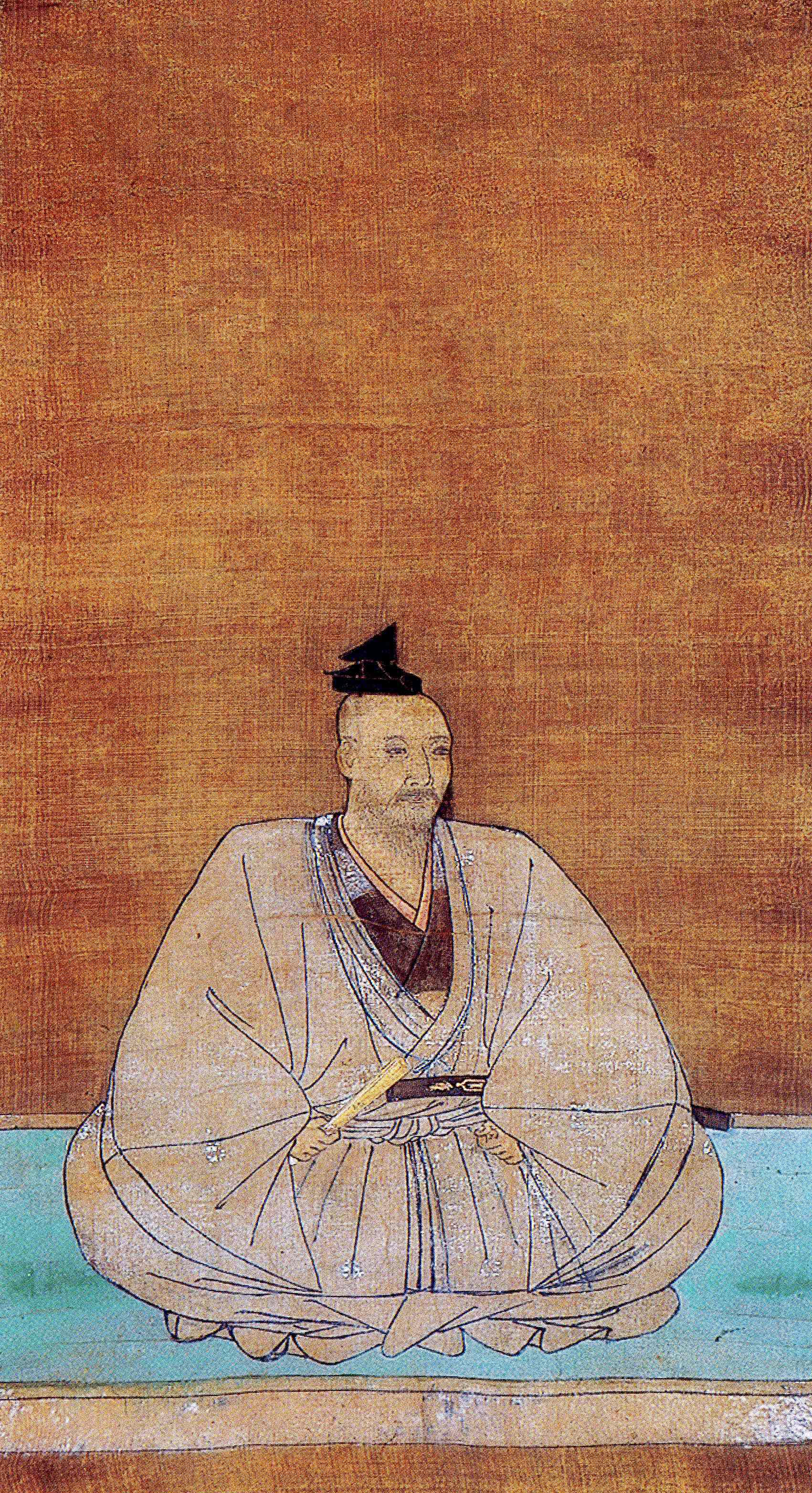

Lord of Shōzui Castle
- In office 1553–1562
- Preceded by: Hosokawa Mochitaka
- Succeeded by: Sogō Masayasu

Personal details
- Born: c. 1527
- Died: April 8, 1562
- Relations: Miyoshi Motonaga (father); Miyoshi Nagayoshi (brother); Atagi Fuyuyasu (brother); Sogō Kazumasa (brother)
- Children: Miyoshi Nagaharu; Sogō Masayasu

Military service
- Allegiance: Miyoshi clan
- Battles/wars: Shōzui Incident (1553); Kumeta War (1562)

Miyoshi Yoshikata (三好 義賢; c. 1527 – April 8, 1562), other name Miyoshi Yukiyasu (三好 之康) or Miyoshi Jikkyu (三好 実休), second son of Miyoshi Motonaga, was a Japanese samurai of the Sengoku period, who served the Miyoshi clan.

His other brothers were Miyoshi Nagayoshi (first child), Atagi Fuyuyasu (third child), and Sogō Kazumasa (fourth child). His son was Miyoshi Nagaharu. He was also the castle lord in command of Shōzui Castle. Yoshitaka expelled Hosokawa Mochitaka and captured Shōzui Castle, which then became the main base of Miyoshi clan in Shikoku.

He was shot and killed during Kumeta war in 1562. He was one of the most important vassals of Nagayoshi as the power of the Miyoshi clan declined sharply after his death.
