= Hatakeyama Takamasa =

Daimyō of the Hatakeyama clan

Hatakeyama Takamasa (畠山 高政; 1527 – November 5, 1576) was a daimyō of the Hatakeyama clan of Kawachi Province during the late Sengoku period of Japanese history.

In 1562, he led Hatakeyama clan at the Battle of Kyōkōji, one of the many battles fought between the Miyoshi and Hatakeyama in the Sengoku period. On 19–20 May of that year, the battle was won by Miyoshi Nagayoshi over Hatakeyama.
