= Taihei-ji =

Buddhist temple in Osaka, Japan

Coordinates: 34.6593°N 135.5137°E

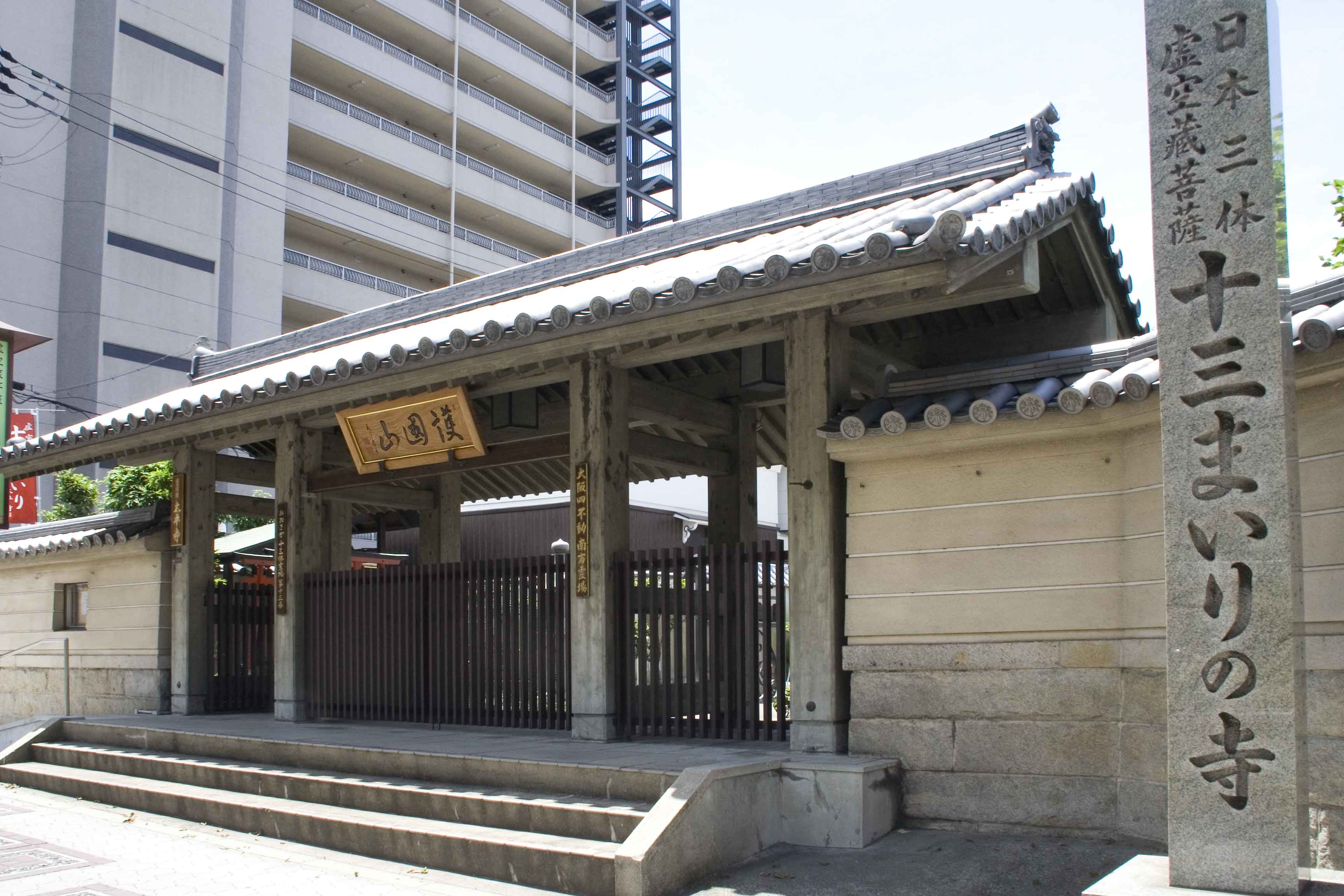
Taihei-ji

Taihei-ji (太平寺) is a Buddhist temple in Osaka Prefecture, Japan. It was founded in about 1555 during the tumultuous Senguoku period, and it is affiliated with Sōtō school of Japanese Zen Buddhism.

== See also ==
- Thirteen Buddhist Sites of Osaka
