= Meiō incident =

15th-century coup d'état in Japan

Meiō incident (Meiō coup)
- Part of the Sengoku period
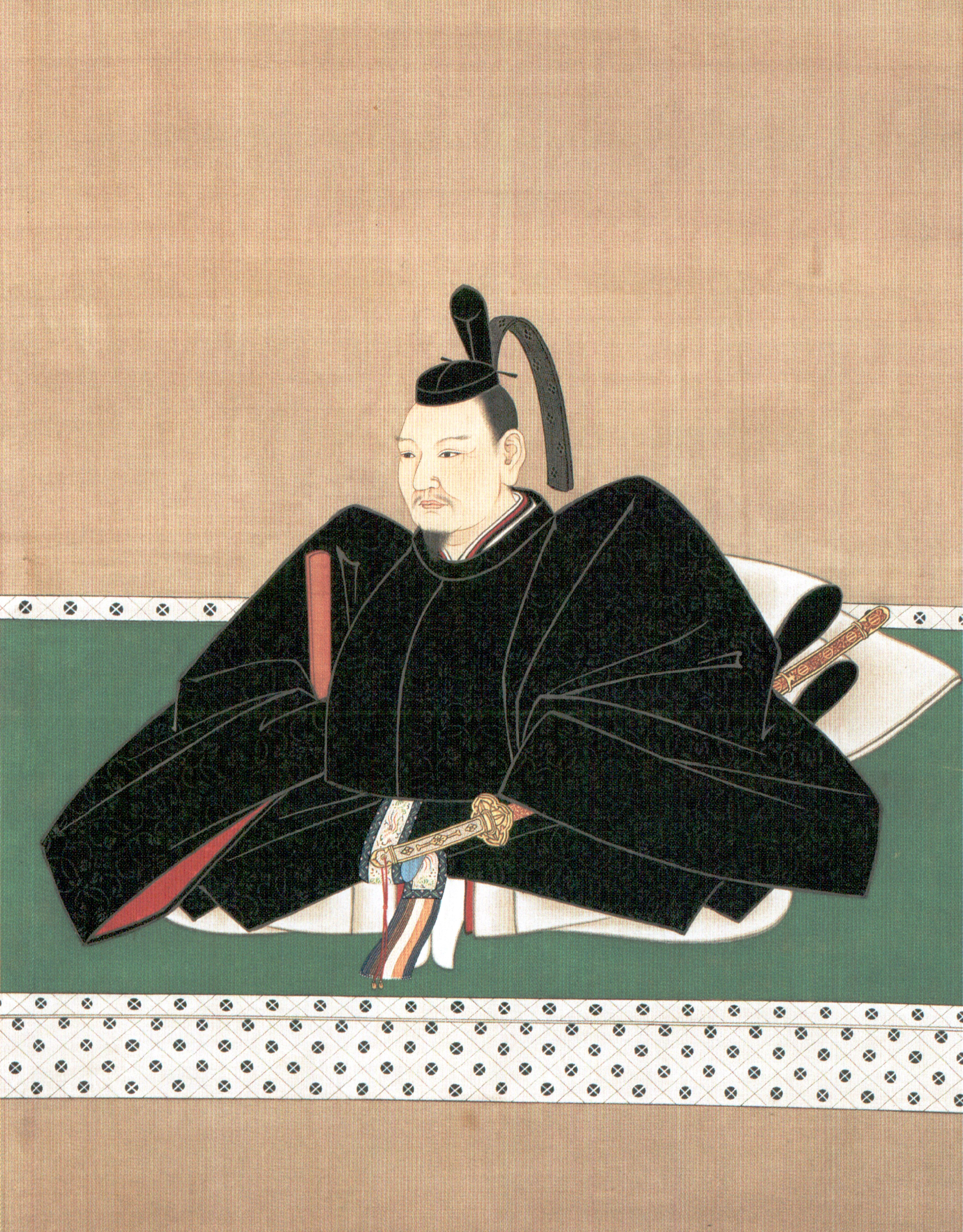
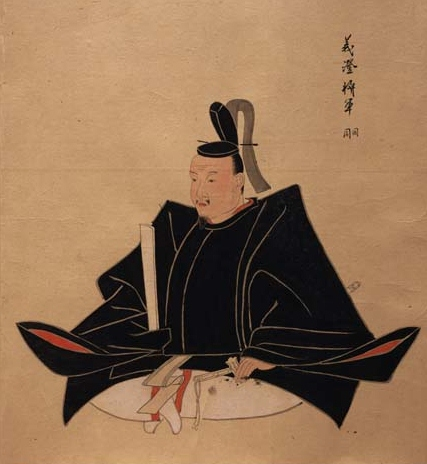
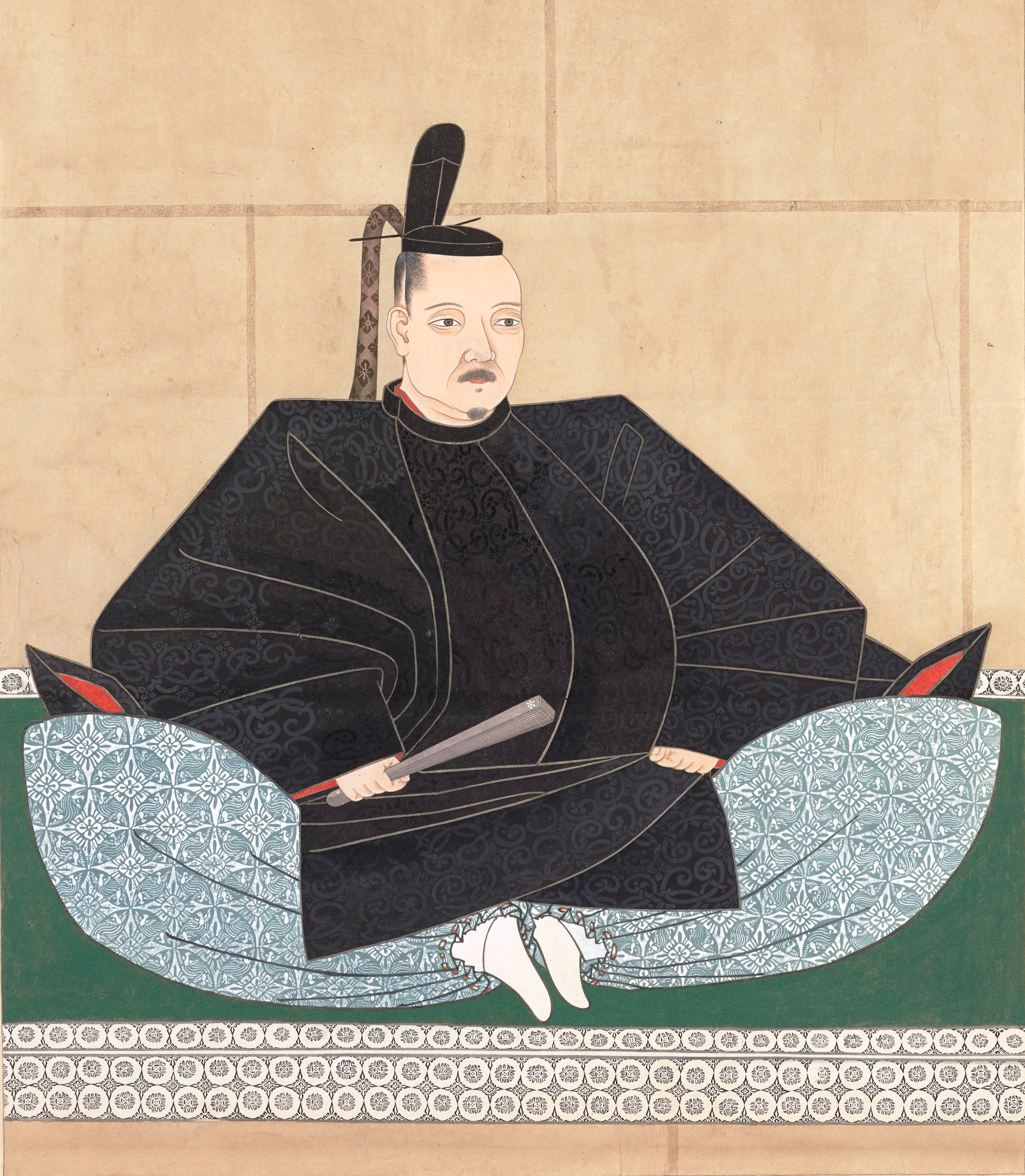
- From left to right, top to bottom: Hosokawa Masamoto; Ashikaga Yoshitō; Ashikaga Yoshiki
Date	8 May–10 June, 1493 (Initial coup); 1493–1508 (Subsequent conflict)
Location	Kansai region, Japan
Action	Raising of troops in the capital
Result	See text

Major clans involved
During coup: Hosokawa; Hatakeyama (Sōshū branch); Ise; Ashikaga (under Yoshitō)	During coup: Hatakeyama (Oshū branch); Ashikaga (under Yoshiki)
Following coup: Ashikaga (under Yoshitō); Hosokawa (main branch); Hatakeyama (Sōchū branch) (1493-1499)	Following coup: Ashikaga (under Yoshiki); Hatakeyama (Oshū branch); Ōuchi

Commanders and leaders
During coup: Hosokawa Masamoto; Ise Sadamune; Hino Tomiko	During coup: Ashikaga Yoshiki; Hatakeyama Masanaga †
Following coup: Hosokawa Masamoto X; Hosokawa Sumimoto; Ashikaga Yoshitō (Note: Later Yoshitaka, then Yoshizumi.); Hatakeyama Motoie	Following coup: Ashikaga Yoshiki (Note: Later Yoshitada.); Hatakeyama Hisanobu; Ōuchi Yoshioki

The Meiō incident, or Meiō coup (Japanese: 明応の政変, Hepburn: meiō no seihen), was a late 15th century coup d'état in Japan, when deputy-shogun Hosokawa Masamoto deposed the tenth shogun of Japan, Ashikaga Yoshitane. On the night of 9 May, 1493, (Note: Late in the fourth month of Meiō 2.) Masamoto raised troops in Kyoto. With support from Hino Tomiko and Ise Sadamune, he deposed Yoshitane (at the time Yoshiki), (Note: In medieval Japan, it was common for people to change their names to reflect changes of status.) installing Ashikaga Yoshizumi (at the time Yoshitō) as the new shogun. Although the coup was initially successful, Yoshitane escaped from house arrest in Kyoto and established himself in Etchū Province. (Note: Modern-day Toyama Prefecture.) Masamoto failed to decisively defeat him again, effectively splitting Japan between two rival governments. Masamoto also faced internal opposition from the Awa branch of the Hosokawa clan, especially after he adopted an heir from outside the clan. In 1507, Masamoto was assassinated, and Yoshiki deposed Yoshitō the following year.

The primary cause of the Meiō incident was that Yoshitane continued fighting military campaigns despite Masamoto's objections, particularly his campaign against Hatakeyama Yoshitoyo in Kawachi Province. (Note: Eastern Osaka Prefecture.) The aim of the campaign was the reunification of the Hatakeyama clan under Hatakeyama Masanaga, (Note: The Hatakeyama clan had been divided between the Oshū and Sōshū branches from c. 1455 over a dispute of leadership between Masanaga and Yoshinari.) which Masamoto opposed because the Hatakeyama clan was the most powerful rival to the Hosokawa clan for the position of kanrei. In addition, Yoshiki had begun to rely more on other daimyo, including Masamoto's rival Hosokawa Yoshiharu, with the intention of reducing his dependency on Masamoto.

The coup and the subsequent conflict heavily reduced the shogunate's power over the daimyo, as it was forced to rely on the support of powerful clans. The Hosokawa clan was divided into two warring factions after Masamoto's death, while the Ōuchi clan under Ōuchi Yoshioki reached the height of its influence. In addition, the shōgun-ke (将軍家; family members of the shogun who could succeed him) was subsequently divided into those descended from Yoshitō and those descended from Yoshiki.

== Background ==
In the Ōnin War, Yoshiki supported his father Ashikaga Yoshimi, who was the commander of the Western Army. After the conflict, the Western Army was weakened, and the pair took refuge with Toki Shigeyori in Mino Province. Yoshiki's cousin, shogun Ashikaga Yoshihisa, led a military expedition to Ōmi Province in order to subjugate the Rokkaku clan, led by Rokkaku Yukitaka (later Takayori), during which he unexpectedly died of an illness on the 26th day of the third month of Chōkyō 3 (Note: Also Entoku 1; the era name was changed in August 1489.) (26 April 1489). (Note: Gahō 1834, p. 361.)

With his father, Yoshiki went to Kyoto to claim the title of shogun. Many people, including the former shogun Ashikaga Yoshimasa and kanrei Hosokawa Masamoto disapproved of him, and instead supported the claim of Seikō (later Yoshitō), the son of Yoshiki and Yoshihisa's cousin Ashikaga Masatomo, who was horigoe kubō (堀越公方). (Note: A deputy of the kantō kubō at horigoe gosho near the modern-day city of Izunokuni.) However, Yoshiki's aunt, Hino Tomiko, supported him, and when Yoshimasa died in the first month of Entoku 2 (January 1490), it was agreed that he would become shogun on the condition that Yoshimi became a monk. Tomiko had been a member of the shogunal family for nearly 40 years, first as Yoshimasa's wife and later as Yoshihisa's mother. As a result, she occasionally handled governmental affairs on behalf of the shogun. Her support significantly helped Yoshiki become shogun, and she was the person who informed the Imperial Court of his succession.

The new shogun was also opposed by Ise Sadamune, who resigned as head of the mandokoro on 27th day of the fourth month (15 May 1490). Although Sadamune had Tomiko's trust, as he had been a close aide of Yoshihisa since Yoshihisa was a young child and had devoted himself to the former shogun's upbringing, his father, Ise Sadachika, had lost favor after advising Yoshimasa to have Yoshimi killed during the Bunshō incident.

Despite supporting Yoshiki, Tomiko unexpectedly decided to transfer Ogawa palace to Seikō in order to curb the excesses of Yoshiki and Yoshimi, who had suddenly risen to power. Yoshimi was enraged when he found out that Seikō was to inherit the residence, which was a symbol of the shogun, and demolished Ogawa palace and seized the land in the fifth month (May-June), without permission from Tomiko. Tomiko subsequently turned against Yoshimi and Yoshiki, and continued to oppose Yoshiki after Yoshimi's death. Afterwards, on the 26th day of the eighth month (21 September 1490), Yoshiki and Seikō met in person and reconciled. This was due to the efforts of Masamoto and Ashizu Toshiyori, who agreed with Masamoto's intentions.

On the fifth day of the seventh month (2 August 1490), Yoshiki was officially appointed shogun by the Imperial Court while Yoshimi was granted the rank of Quasi-Third Prince, and it was believed that the father-son duo would remain in power. But Yoshimi developed boils in the eleventh month and died on the seventh day of the first month of Entoku 3 (15 February 1491) after treatment proved ineffective. For Yoshiki, his death was a severe blow, as Yoshimi, who had accumulated political experience while commanding the Western Army during the Ōnin War, was a reliable ally. Yoshiki was subsequently forced to think of a way to solidify his political situation on his own. After consulting with his close retainers, he decided to subjugate powerful daimyo to increase his authority.

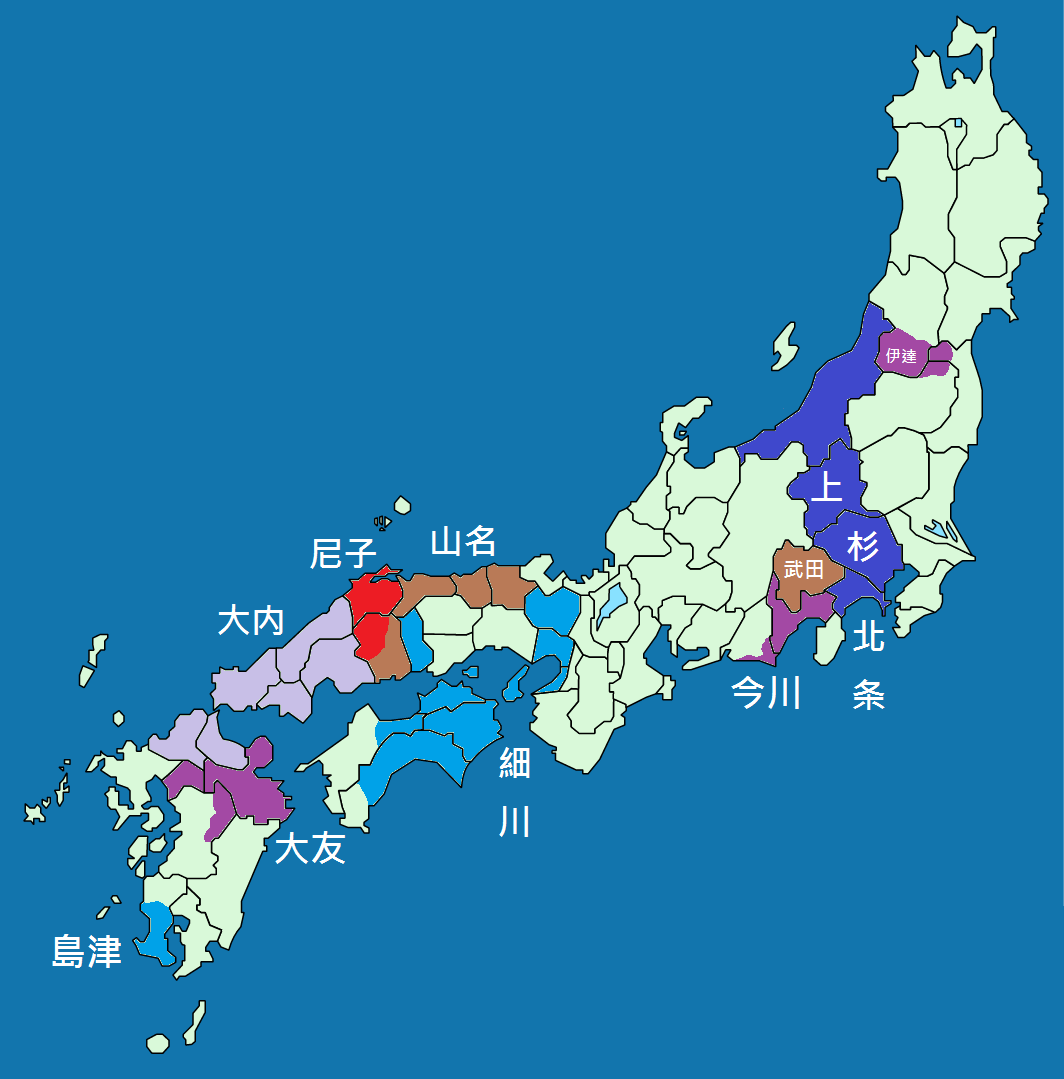
Major daimyo in 1490

=== Ōmi and Kawachi campaigns ===
Yoshiki continued policies of Yoshihisa, and responded to provincial uprisings in Tanba, Yamashiro, and other provinces in the Kinai region by ordering an attack on Rokkaku Yukitaka in Ōmi Province and strengthening the military. Many daimyo, including the Hosokawa clan, participated in the expedition, successfully overwhelming Yukitaka and driving him to Kōka and then Ise Province. At the same time, because Masamoto opposed the expedition (Note: Jinson, Entry for Entoku 3, 7th of the 8th month.) and Masamoto's general Yasutomi Motoie was defeated by the Rokkaku army, Yoshiki began to rely more on other daimyo.

In the first month of Meiō 2 (January-February 1493), at the request of the former kanrei Hatakeyama Masanaga, Yoshiki issued an order to attack Hatakeyama Motoie in Kawachi Province and once again called for the daimyo to provide troops. During the Ōnin War, Masanaga had fought with his cousin Yoshinari over the family succession, dividing the Hatakeyama clan into two warring families, the Sōshū, led by Yoshinari, and the Oshū, led by Masanaga. Masanaga continued to fight with Motoie after Yoshinari's death. Yoshiki responded by accepting Masanaga's appeal for a dispatch of troops, in order to both settle the succession question in Masanaga's favor and reduce his dependence on Masamoto. The daimyo who had been ordered to do so then massed their forces in the capital, but Masamoto did not send troops.

Like with the Rokkaku campaign, Masamoto was opposed to this campaign. The Hatakeyama and Hosokawa clans both had the right to become kanrei, and Masamoto (and, by extension, the Hosokawa clan) benefitted from the division of the Hatakeyama clan, as it reduced their power. For that reason, Masamoto's father Katsumoto had intervened in the succession dispute during the Ōnin War, and reduced the Hatakeyama's power by supporting Masanaga in his fight with Yoshinari. But Yoshiki's Kawachi campaign would reunite the Hatakeyama clan under Masanaga, and the reinvigorated Hatakeyama would once again have the ability to threaten the Hosokawa.

Eventually, Yoshiki overcame Masamoto's opposition, and on the 15th day of the second month of Meiō 2 (3 March 1493), the expedition marched from Kyōto to Kawachi Province. Yoshiki entered Shōgaku-ji on the 24th (12 March), and set up his headquarters there. The daimyo also surrounded and besieged Honda castle (Takaya castle), where Hatakeyama Motoie had established himself. As a result, smaller castles that supported Motoie surrendered one by one, and he was forced into isolation by the third month (late March). Victory for Yoshiki and Masanaga had seemingly become imminent.

But Masamoto colluded with Motoie to prevent the reunification of the Hatakeyama. Masamoto had already been in contact with Motoie's retainers just prior to the start of the Kawachi campaign, and Motoie's chief vassal reportedly boasted on Meiō 2, 23rd of the 2nd month (11 March 1493) that "even if the shogun comes to assault us, this wouldn't even be an issue. That is because Ise Sadamune and all the other daimyo have already reached an agreement with us." (Note: Jinson, Entry for Meiō 2, 23rd of the 2nd month.) Spurred by rumors that Yoshiki would attack him next, Masamoto aligned himself with Akamatsu Masanori and Ise Sadamune, as well as Hino Tomiko.

== The coup ==
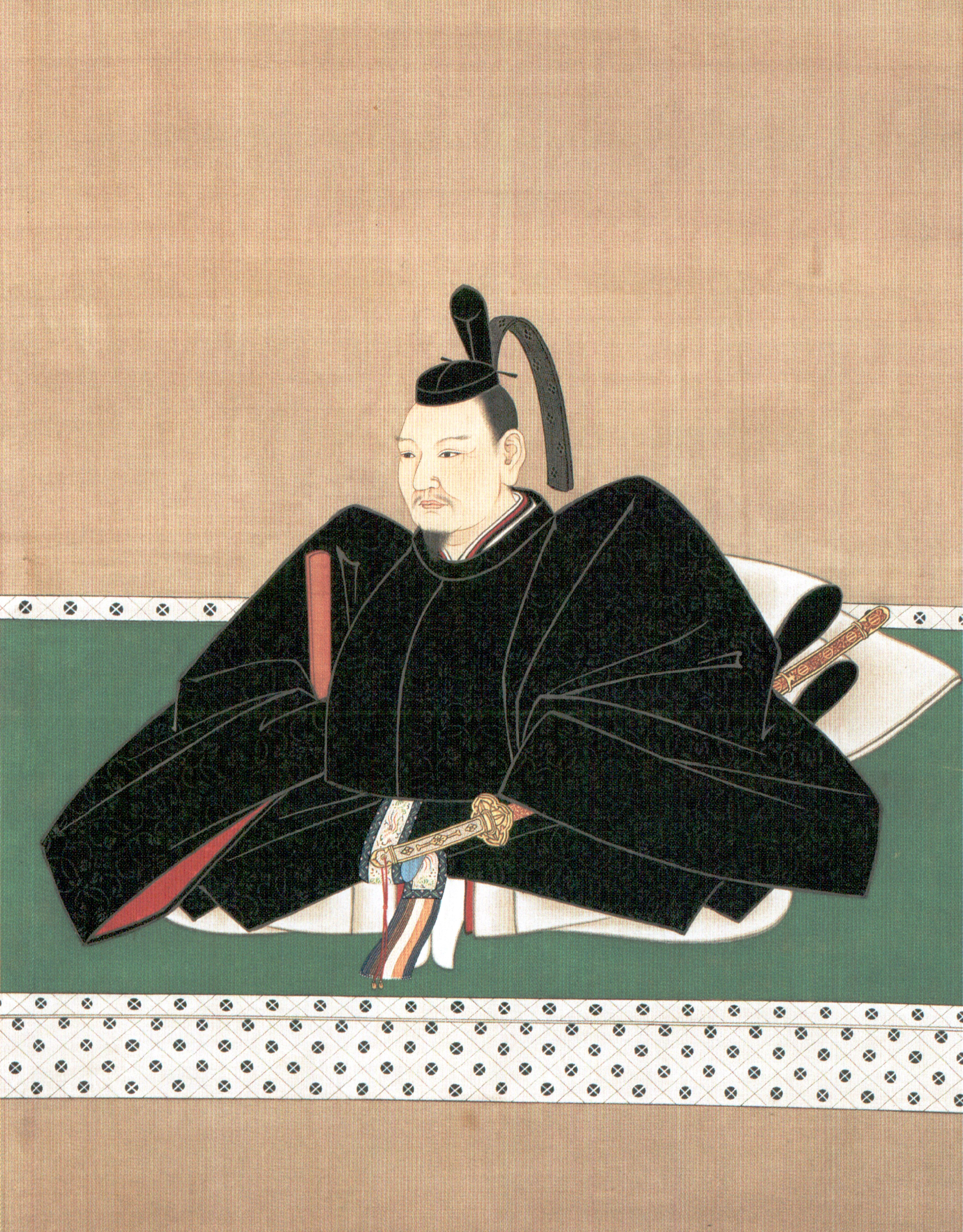
Hosokawa Masamoto

On the night of the 22nd day of the fourth month (8 May 1493), Masamoto raised an army. He immediately ushered Seikō to Yushoken, (Note: One of Masamoto's residences in Kyoto.) and sent soldiers to the residences of Yoshiki's staff. In addition to these residences, the temples where Yoshiki's younger siblings had been sent (Note: Sanbō-in, Donge-in, and Ginkaku-ji.) were raided and destroyed by the army on the 23rd. According to contemporary records, Tomiko, being midaidokoro of Yoshimasa, assumed direct command (Note: Jinson, Entry for Meiō 2, 4th of the intercalary 4th month.) and had Masamoto take control of the capital.

Masamoto declared that he was going to depose Yoshiki and support Seikō as shogun, and that Masanaga was relieved of his duties as shugo of Kawachi. On the 28th day of the fourth month (14 May), he had Seikō return to secular life and take the name Yoshitō, supporting him as the 11th shogun.

Yoshiki and the various daimyo, as well as the shogun's followers (such as numerous servants and bugyō), were taken by surprise. When forged documents containing orders to obey the new shogun were sent from Ise Sadamune to Yoshiki's daimyo and servants, most of them returned to Kyoto from Kawachi on the 27th day (13 May). (Note: Kanroji 1499, Entry for Meiō 2, 26th of the 4th month.) They then assembled under Yoshitō, while none of the daimyo supported Yoshiki except for Hatakeyama Masanaga.

Immediately following Masamoto's actions, it was rumored that Akamatsu Masanori was supporting Yoshiki instead of Masamoto, as he had proactively cooperated in the recent Rokkaku campaign and had an intimate connection with Yoshiki. But because Masanori had married Masamoto's sister Tōshōin prior to Masamoto raising his troops, he ultimately decided to align himself with Masamoto.

Ōuchi Yoshioki, the son of Ōuchi Masahiro, who was the shugo of Suō and Nagato Provinces, also aligned himself with Masamoto. On the first day of the intercalary (Note: In the Chinese lunar calendar, a month is periodically added every few years.) fourth month (16 May 1493), Yoshioki's sister in Kyoto was abducted by subordinates of Takeda Motonobu. (Note: Jinson, Entry for Meiō 2, 1st of the intercalary 4th month.) It is possible that, in order to prevent Masahiro (who had fought in the Western Army in support of Yoshimi and Yoshiki up to the end of the Ōnin War) from conspiring with Yoshiki, Masamoto and Motonobu took his daughter as a hostage to force him to consent to the coup.

However, even as the daimyo returned to their provinces, Yoshiki still had 8,000 of Masanaga's soldiers, who remained in high spirits and were prepared to fight to the death. On the third day of the intercalary fourth month (18 May), Takeda Motonobu went to the capital from Wakasa Province to join Masamoto. Around the same time, Akamatsu Masanori and Ōuchi Yoshioki unsuccessfully proposed the idea of having Yoshitō succeed Yoshiki as the latter's adopted son. (Note: Jinson, Entry for Meiō 2, 19th of the intercalary 4th month.)

=== Reaction of the Imperial Court ===
Upon hearing of the event, Emperor Go-Tsuchimikado commanded Shirakawa Tadatomiō, who was the Mōshitsugi and director of the Department of Divinities, to summon three key retainers: Kajūji Norihide, Kanroji Chikanaga, and Sanjōnishi Sanetaka. The Emperor expressed a desire to abdicate, both because he was enraged that the shogun he had appointed had been overthrown, and because Prince Katsuhito (later Emperor Go-Kashiwabara) had come of age. Chikagana and Tadatomiō were against this, with Chikanaga saying "Even if the shogunal family changes and asks difficult things of him, the Emperor's rule is to do as he is told. It would be good if the crown prince were also asked to abdicate by the shogunal family." As a result, the Emperor changed his mind. (Note: Kanroji 1499, Frame 126.)

For five days starting on the 24th day (10 May 1493), the Imperial Court held a planned discussion on the Amitābha Sūtra, and delayed responding to the coup as the Emperor was listening. On the 28th day (14 May), Hosokawa Masamoto made an imperial visit, (Note: A donation of necessary dues.) and Yoshitō was promoted to Junior Fifth Rank, Lower Grade (従五位下, Ju go-i no ge). At this time, Chikanaga, who was involved with imperial proclamations, mentioned that "if an imperial visitation is not observed, one must not mutually obey." Although a joi donation (Note: An imparting of rank similar to investiture.) of 300 bolts of cloth had been made, Yoshitō's proclamation as shogun was postponed because Masamoto had not yet met the necessary expenses. (Note: Kanroji 1499, Entry for Meiō 2, 28th of the 4th month.)

=== Masanaga dies and Yoshiki surrenders ===
On the fifth day of the intercalary fourth month (20 May 1493), Kisen Shūshō resigned from the position of Inryōshiki, which he had held since Bunmei 18 (1486). Ashizu Toshiyori, descended from the Tenjiku branch of the Hosokawa clan, was appointed as his replacement.

On the seventh day of the intercalary fourth month (22 May), Masamoto deployed troops under Uehara Motohide and Yasutomi Motoie to Kawachi province in order to subjugate Masanaga.

Yoshiki and Masanaga were cornered by the Hosokawa army and made a stand at Shōgaku-ji, still maintaining their determination to fight to the end. Yoshiki placed his chambers in the tallest of Shingaku-ji's more than 100 turrets, and the temple was turned into a fortress and its defenses strengthened.

Soon, in the middle of the same month, a large army, including the Negoro-shū, up to 10,000 strong departed from Kii Province, one of Masanaga's territories, and headed towards Shōgaku-ji. However, the Kii forces were forced to stay at Sakai on the way by Akamatsu Masanori. The two armies faced each other at Sakai and began negotiations, but on the 21st (6 June) they started fighting. The Kii forces had several warships that assisted their land forces, and relentlessly attacked the Akamatsu army. In turn, Masanori personally led the Akamatsu forces and fought hard, and after several hours, defeated the Kii army.

The defeat of the Kii forces, which had been one of Yoshiki and Masanaga's last hopes, shocked them. Had the Kii army won, there would have been an opportunity to cover up the coup, but that prospect vanished, and with food running out Masanaga despaired greatly. On the 24th of the same month (9 June 1493), the besieging forces started an assault on Shōgaku-ji. On the morning of the 25th (10 June), the fortress fell. Masanaga, along with his chief vassals such as Yusa Naganao, committed suicide. Afterwards, Yoshiki and his entourage surrendered to Uehara Motohide and carried with them Onkosode and Mitsurugi. (Note: A hereditary piece of armor and sword, respectively.) They were sent to the capital, where they were first confined to Ryōan-ji, then to Motohide's residence.

Furthermore, kuge Hamuro Mitsutada was killed by Motohide, who took orders from Masamoto. As Mitsutada had been a close aide of Yoshimi, and highly trusted by Yoshiki, he had been appointed dainagon over 18 officials, and for a short while held greater power than the five regent houses, the Buddhist temples, and the kanrei. Even Masamoto had proven unable to offer reports to Yoshiki without going through Mitsutada. For Masamoto, he needed to be eliminated like Masanaga. The Hamuro residence in the capital was also demolished when Masamoto raised his troops.

Masanaga's heir, Hatakeyama Hisanobu, was forced to abandon his claim to the Hatakeyama family succession and fled from Shōgaku-ji to Kii before his father committed suicide. (Note: Yamada 2016, pp. 78, 110.) The Hosokawa forces were unable to capture Hisanobu, and on the 10th day of the ninth month (20 October 1493) Motohide burned down Sumiyoshi-taisha, as he believed that the kannushi of the shrine, Tsumori Kuninori, was harboring one of the Oshū family's retainers, a member of the Yusa clan.

== Subsequent conflict ==
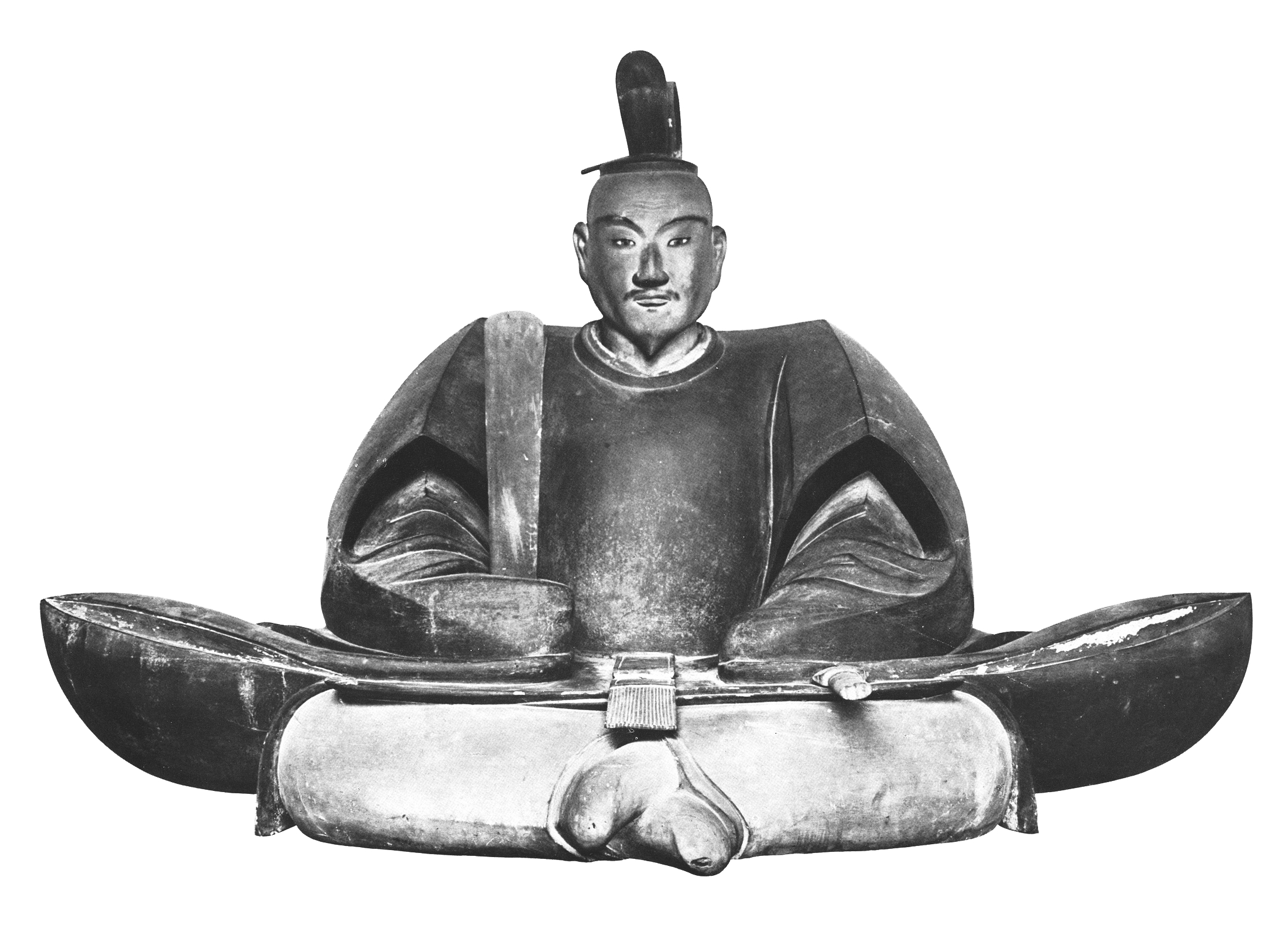
Ashikaga Yoshizumi (Yoshitō)

In the eleventh month of Meiō 3 (December 1494), Yoshitō was officially granted the rank of shō go-i no jō (Senior Fifth Rank, Upper Grade) and appointed Captain of the Left Division of the Bureau of Horses (左馬頭 (sama no kami)), and changed his name to Yoshitaka. In the next month (January 1495), he was officially created shogun. (Note: Gahō 1834, p. 362.)

On the night of the 29th day of the sixth month of Meiō 2 (11 August 1493), Yoshiki, who had been confined to Uehara Motohide's residence in Kyōto, escaped to Hōjōdzu in Imizu District, Etchū Province with assistance from his attendants, where he was received by the shugodai of the province and Hatakeyama Masanaga's chief statesman, Jinbō Naganobu.

From Etchū, Yoshiki circulated a demand for Hosokawa Masamoto to be subdued, after which the Noto Hatakeyama, Echizen Asakura, Echigo Uesugi, and Kaga Togashi, among other daimyo, came to him and proclaimed their loyalty. Starting with the Ōtomo clan from Kyūshū, daimyo from more distance provinces also declared their intention to support Yoshiki. Masamoto promptly deployed an army to Etchū, but in the beginning of the ninth month (October) it suffered a significant defeat after fighting the Etchū forces and was driven back. Consequently, Etchū and its neighboring areas completely sided with Yoshiki, and the shogunate at Kyoto could not make a move. Later, in the ninth month of Meiō 7 (September-October 1498), Yoshiki left Etchū, relying on the Echizen Asakura, and changed his name to Yoshitada. (Note: Yamada 2016, pp. 99–100, 108.)

=== The conflict escalates ===
Early in Meiō 5 (1496), the Ōtomo clan under Ōtomo Masachika sided with Masamoto. Masachika broke the Ōtomo clan's alliance with the Ōuchi clan by killing his son and Ōuchi Yoshioki's cousin, Yoshisuke, as the Ōuchi were enemies of the Hosokawa. Masachika was quickly captured by Ōuchi forces and forced to commit seppuku. Yoshioki then invaded northern Kyushu, successfully defeating Shōni Masasuke by the ninth month of Meiō 6 (October 1497). Yoshioki then began fighting the Ōtomo clan directly. Masachika's heir, Chikaharu, responded by invading Buzen Province on the second of the tenth month, Meiō 7 (16 October 1498). During this conflict, Masamoto convinced Yoshioki's brother Sonkō to join him. The plot was discovered in Meiō 8 (1499), and Sonkō rebelled. He was laicized and took the name Takahiro, and fled to Chikaharu in Bungo Province. On the 25th of the seventh month of Meiō 8 (31 August), Yoshioki dispatched an army under Sugi Shigekata to Buzen. (Note: Conlan 2024, pp. 253–55.)

Hatakeyama Hisanobu, who had escaped to Kii after Shōgaku-ji surrendered, resisted Masamoto's ally Motoie while building his power, and eventually killed Motoie in the second month of Meiō 8 (March 1499). Hisanobu built a massive power base in the region south of Kyōto, from Kii to Kawachi. While struggling to contact Yoshitada in Echizen, he kept watch over the capital, and so became a threat to the Hosokawa forces. (Note: Yamada 2016, p. 110.)

After the ninth month of Meiō 8 (October 1499), Yoshitada and Hisanobu cooperated, and each attempted to move on the capital from Echizen and Kawachi, respectively, in a pincer movement. But after a hard fight, Masamoto defeated Yoshitada, who fled to the Ōuchi clan's capital in Suō Province in Bunki 1 (1501). (Note: Gahō 1834, p. 364.) After this, Hisanobu's pincer operation also failed, and he retreated to Kii. Despite this, Yoshitada and Hisanobu remained threats to Masamoto. In addition, Yoshitaka became an adult and took personal control of governmental affairs, and the conflict between him and Masamoto intensified. (Note: Yamada 2016, pp. 120, 26.)

In the seventh month of Bunki 2 (August 1502), Yoshitaka changed his name to Yoshizumi, was elevated to Senior Fourth Rank, and was made a sangi (Associate Counselor (参議)) and sahyō'e no suke (Assistant Head of Left Military Guards (左兵衛佐)). In the first month of the following year (February 1503), he was further elevated to Senior Third Rank. (Note: Gahō 1834, pp. 364–65.)

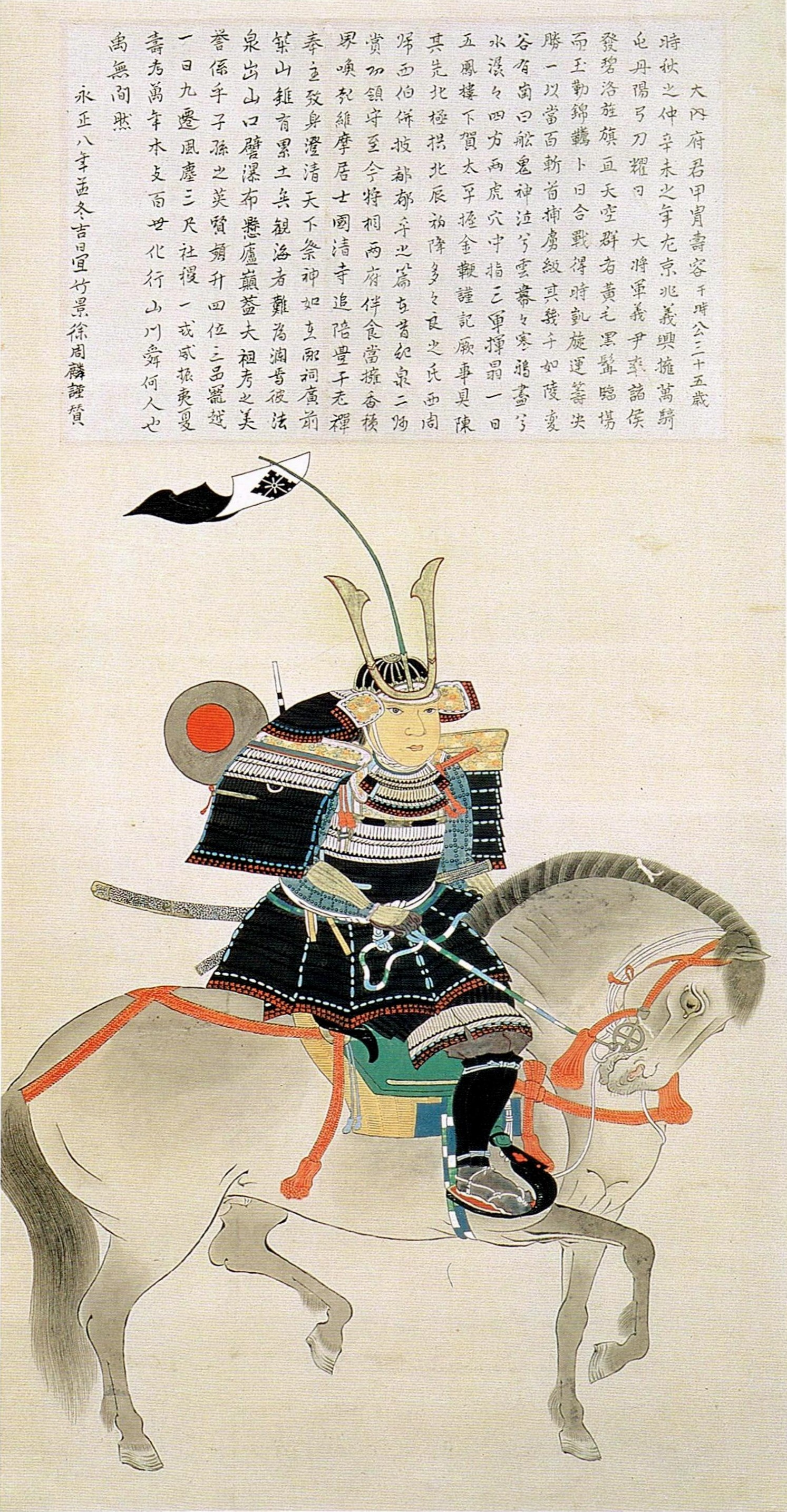
Ōuchi Yoshioki

Yoshitada entered Yamaguchi on the second day of Meiō 10 (20 January 1501). At the same time, the Imperial Court began to support Yoshitada (even naming the following era 文亀 (Bunki) (Note: lit. 'Cultured Turtle') in reference to Myōken, the tutelary deity of the Ōuchi), as did Yoshida Shrine. Yoshizumi and Masamoto responded by forcing Emperor Go-Kashiwabara to declare Yoshitada an enemy of the court. By the end of Bunki 2 (1502), Yoshioki had decisively defeated the Ōtomo clan. He subsequently began preparing to march on Kyoto, reinstating the practice of hanzei (半税) (Note: The taxing of half of a province's revenue for provisions.) for Chikuzen and Buzen in Bunki 3 and 4 (1503-1504). In Eishō 4 (1507), Yoshioki wrote letters in which he declared his intention to restore prosperity to Japan. (Note: Conlan 2024, pp. 254–57, 258.)

=== The tide turns ===
At the same time, the divide between the Keijō branch (which Masamoto was the head of) and the Awa branch of the Hosokawa worsened. Hosokawa Yoshiharu, who had been established as a rival candidate to Masamoto by Yoshitada, died two years after the coup, seemingly ending the rivalry between the two branches of the Hosokawa clan. However, as he was dedicated to Shugendō, Masamoto had no children, and as he feared the rise of cadet branches such as the Awa Hosokawa, he purposely adopted Hosokawa Sumiyuki from the Kujō clan, one of the five regent houses, instead of someone from the Hosokawa clan. But the cadet clans strongly opposed Sumiyuki, who was unrelated to the Hosokawa clan, being the clan's successor, and in Bunki 3 (1503) Masamoto was forced to adopt Yoshiharu's son Sumimoto and disinherit Sumiyuki. (Note: Yamada 2016, p. 133.) This resulted in Sumiyuki's partisans, including Kōzai Motonaga, killing Masamoto on the 23rd of the sixth month of Eishō 4 (1 August 1507). (Note: Gahō 1834, pp. 365–66.) (Note: Arai 1982, pp. 269–70.)

Masanaga supported the youngest son of kampaku Kujō Hisatsune, Hosokawa Tsuneyuki, as Masamoto's successor. Sumimoto was not in the capital at the time of Masamoto's death, so he and his supporters, including Miyoshi Nagateru, marched with an army of 3,000 men from Awa in the seventh month of Eishō 4 (August 1507). They defeated Masanaga in the following month, and Sumimoto was declared kanrei. In the first month of the same year (February 1507), the news of Masamoto's death reached Ōuchi Yoshioki. (Note: Gahō 1834, pp. 366, 366–67.) (Note: Arai 1982, pp. 270–71.) By the 25th day of the eleventh month (28 December), Yoshioki and Yoshitada started marching north, with an army of 11,000-13,000 troops and a fleet of 660 ships. The fleet arrived at Hyōgo on the 23rd of the fourth month of Eishō 5 (22 May 1508), while the army arrived six weeks later, on the eighth of the sixth month (17 July). (Note: Conlan 2024, p. 259.)

In the fourth month (May 1508), Sumimoto moved to Awa, while Yoshizumi went to Ōmi and requested the support of Rokkaku Takayori. (Note: Gahō 1834, p. 367.) (Note: Arai 1982, p. 271.) When Hosokawa Sumimoto fled, he was replaced by Hosokawa Takakuni, (Note: Masamoto's third adopted son.) who supported Yoshitada and Yoshioki. At the same time, Yoshitada set up camp at Sakai. Nagateru marched to Kyoto in the following month (June) and combined his forces with Takayori's. They were defeated, and Yoshitada entered the capital in the sixth month (July). In the seventh month (August 1508), he was reinstated as shogun, made dainagon (Great Counselor (大納言)), and returned to Senior Third Rank. In addition, Yoshioki was made kanrei. In the twelfth month (December 1508 – January 1509), Yoshitada was further elevated to Senior Second Rank.

On the 17th day of the sixth month of Eishō 6 (4 July 1509), Sumimoto and Nagateru established a force of 3000 soldiers at Nyoigatake. (Note: In Sakyō-ku, Kyoto) Yoshioki and Takakuni sent a force of 20-30 thousand soldiers, which quickly defeated Sumimoto and Nagateru. On the 27th of the tenth month (8 December), supporters of Yoshizumi and Sumimoto broke into the shogun's residence. Yoshitada fought them, and received nine minor injuries. In the same month, Yoshitada raised an army to attack Ōmi Province, which entered the province on the 14th of the second month of Eishō 7 (23 March 1510). They were repelled on the 26th (4 April).

In the 8th month of the following year (August–September 1511), Yoshizumi died in Ōmi Province. (Note: Gahō 1834, p. 368.) (Note: Arai 1982, p. 272.) In the same month, Hosokawa Masakata gathered troops from Shikoku and eastern provinces and prepared to attack Kyoto. Yoshitada and Yoshioki fled to Tanba Province, and Masakata entered the capital. In response, Yoshitada assembled an army and fought Masakata at Mount Funaoka, (Note: Conlan 2024, p. 250.) the latter of whom was killed in the battle.

== Aftermath ==
In addition to adopting Sumiyuki and Sumimoto, Masamoto also adopted Hosokawa Takakuni from the Yashū branch of the Hosokawa. After Masamoto's assassination, Takakuni sided with Sumimoto, defeating Sumiyuki and driving him to suicide on the first day of the eighth month of Eishō 4 (7 September, 1507). Sumimoto then assumed leadership of the Keijō branch, with Takakuni supporting him. Takakuni ceased supporting Sumimoto early in Eishō 5 (1508), supporting Yoshitane in the fourth month (June). After the Battle of Nyoigatake and defeat of the shogunate in Ōmi, the division between the pro-Takakuni and pro-Sumimoto factions, known as the Both Hosokawas War, continued for several decades.

Following the Meiō incident, the shogunal family was divided into the "Yoshitane branch" (Ashikaga Yoshitsuna and Ashikaga Yoshihide) and the "Yoshizumi branch" (Ashikaga Yoshiharu, Ashikaga Yoshiteru, and Ashikaga Yoshiaki), all of whom were given titles used by the head of Ashikaga shogunal family such as "Muromachi-dono," "Kubō," and "Taiju." The Miyoshi Sanninshū and Matsunaga Hisamichi may have assassinated the 13th shogun, Yoshiteru, in order to end this division. The division of the shogunal family and the conflicts among various factions continued throughout the Sengoku period, which ended when Oda Nobunaga entered the capital.

== Analysis ==
The Meiō incident had an influence on the third kanrei clan, (Note: The Hosokawa, Hatakeyama, and Shiba clans officially alternated as kanrei from 1398.) the Shiba. Shiba Yoshitoshi, a retired member of the Buei branch of the Shiba Clan, sided with Yoshiki to curtail Masamoto's influence, and Yoshitoshi's son and head of the family, Shiba Yoshihiro, reorganized the administrations of Owari and Tōtōmi provinces. These actions succeeded in recovering their influence in the shogunate and controlling their shugodai such as the Oda, but the Imagawa clan's intermittent invasions of Tōtōmi that had started during the Ōnin War intensified. This forced Yoshihiro to send troops to Tōtōmi from Owari, and the Shiba clan effectively disappeared from the central government.

Throughout Japan, especially in the east, warfare and gekokujō (Note: A person or group of lower status overthrowing a person or group of higher status.) created significant opportunities to change the status quo as a result of the Meiō incident. Although the Sengoku period is traditionally considered to have started with the Ōnin War, historian Ryōichi Suzuki's 1963 proposal to set the Meiō incident as the start of the Sengoku period has become more commonly accepted by Japanese historians. (Note: Conlan 2024, pp. 249–50.)

== Causes ==
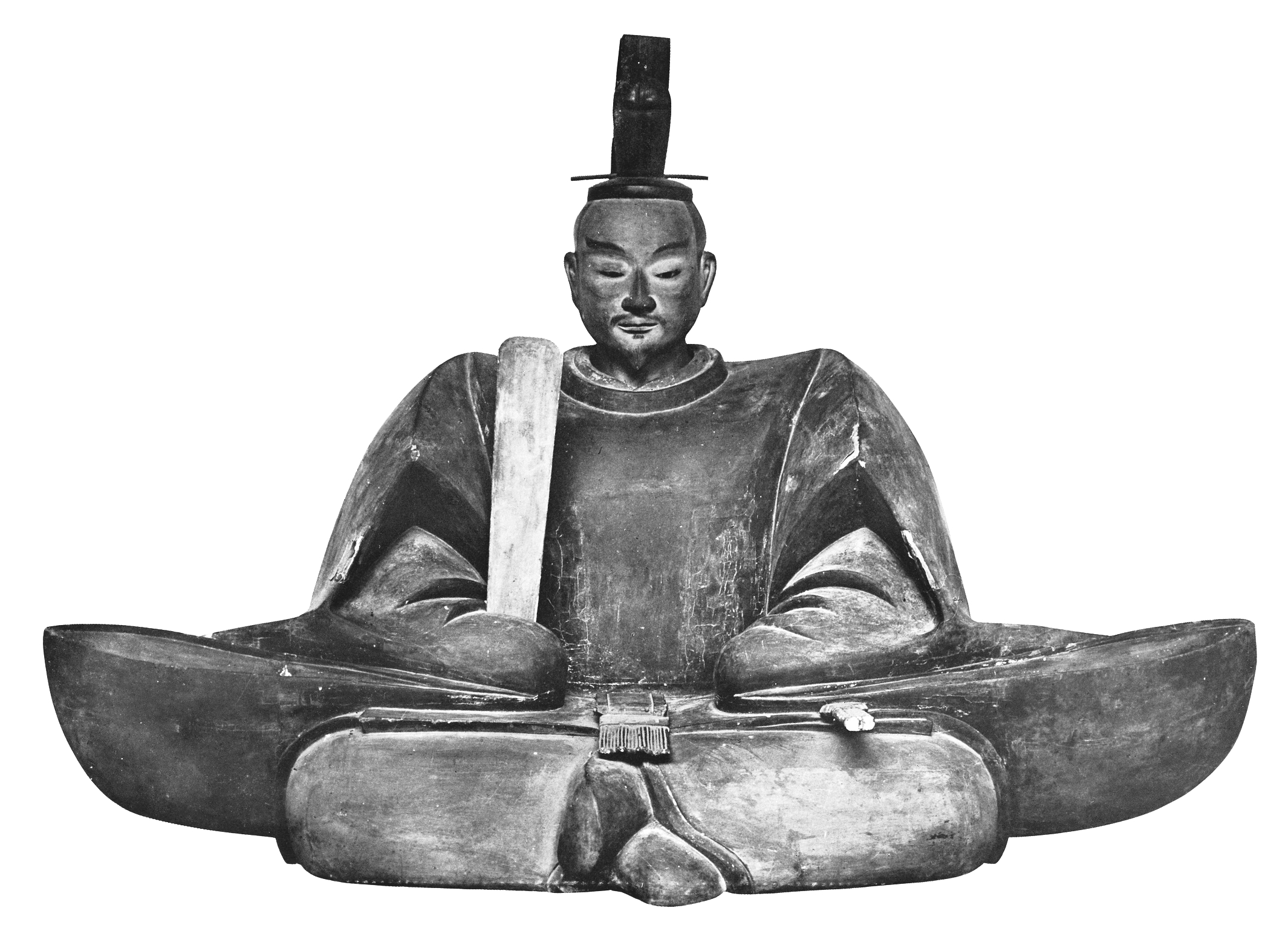
A statue of Ashikaga Yoshitane (Yoshiki)

=== Masamoto ===
According to Masamoto's reports to the Imperial Court and Jinson's records, (Note: Jinson, Entry for Meiō 2, 10th of the intercalary 4th month.) Yoshiki ignored Masamoto's objections to the large-scale Rokkaku and Kawachi military campaigns, despite having promised to leave government affairs to him. Yoshiki decided on the Kawachi expedition on Hatakeyama Masanaga's request. Yoshiki approached Masanaga in order to reduce his dependence on Masamoto, with the expectation that in doing so he could demand Masanaga's gratitude. As mentioned above, it was essential for Masamoto that the reunification of the Hatakeyama clan be prevented, but Yoshiki disregarded his objections. Hatakeyama Motoie had been chased to the point of nearly being ruined, and the reunification of the Hatakeyama was imminently approaching. It was only a matter of time until the Hatakeyama, whose power had been steadily reduced since Masamoto's father was alive, were restored as a powerful daimyo in Kinai.

Moreover, Yoshiki may have been planning Masamoto's removal, and Jinson records that the coup happened because Yoshiki had wanted to remove Masamoto from the government due to his opposition. Yoshiki was quickly turning to Masamoto's rival Hosokawa Yoshiharu, who was head of the most powerful branch of the Hosokawa clan, the Awa Hosokawa. In the sixth month of Entoku 3 (July 1491), Yoshiki gave him the character 義 (yoshi) and allowed him to change his name to Yoshiharu (義春) from Yukikatsu (之勝), (Note: 義 was the inherited character (通字, tōriji/tsūji) of the Ashikaga clan; by allowing Yukikatsu to use it, Yoshiki was showing significant favor.) and moved his residence from the palace on Sanjō Street to Yoshiharu's mansion on Ichijō Street and Aburanokōji Street.

Not only was Yoshiharu's status rising, Yoshiki's personal authority was increasing while Masamoto's was decreasing. Yoshiki had not initially been in a position to become shogun, and as he had suddenly become shogun after Yoshihisa's death, his connections with his close followers and the daimyo were weak, so it was vital for him to prove his abilities. This is likely why he continued the campaigns over Masamoto's objections. Yoshiki then increased his power by showing his bravery on the front lines, subjugating the Rokkaku and conquering Kawachi. Along with the strengthening of his authority, political power in Japan was centering around Yoshiki while Masamoto was becoming increasingly isolated.

=== Others ===
The daimyo participated in the Rokkaku and Kawachi campaigns because they were opportunities to prove their loyalty to the shogun, and they could expect assistance from a large army from other daimyo in the name of the shogun. In the Rokkaku campaign, Shiba Yoshihiro demanded the recovery of Echizen Province, which had been annexed by the Asakura clan in the Ōnin War. Yoshiki responded favorably, and he is believed to have planned an Echizen campaign following the Kawachi campaign. Had Yoshiki actually made the order for the Echizen campaign, the mobilizing of the various daimyo could have been enough to destroy the Asakura clan. But Yoshiki's decision to dispatch troops twice in succession imposed a burden on the daimyo, with large war expenditures and supply of provisions. For example, the Ōuchi clan raised 16,000 koku of army provisions from their home province during the Rokkaku campaign. It was obvious that the Echizen campaign, planned to begin after the Kawachi campaign, would further burden the daimyo. This likely caused a feeling of war-weariness to spread among the daimyo, and when Masamoto's coup forced them to choose between Masamoto and Yoshiki, everyone except Masanaga joined him.

Hino Tomiko supported Yoshitō because, as a representative of the shogunal family, she was concerned by Yoshiki's reckless use of power. This was already a worry of hers since his father, Yoshimi, had destroyed Ogawa-gosho, but as Yoshiki had continued to increase the burden of the daimyō with large military campaigns, the daimyō slowly grew to be dissatisfied with the shogunate. Tomiko, who had come to carry the burden of the shogunal family for many years, likely felt that a great crisis of the existence of the Ashikaga shogunate was approaching. Ultimately, the decision to overthrow Yoshiki was not only Masamoto's, but also Tomiko's: As a member of the shogunal family, Yoshiki's decisions depended on her support, and the shogun's immediate followers' decisions are believed to have been heavily influenced by her. When Tomiko decided to depose Yoshiki, her recognition of the coup lent it significant legitimacy, resulting in the daimyo and the shogun's immediate followers abandoning Yoshiki and supporting Yoshitō. The coup was not something that Masamoto was able to do on his own, but was rather something that could only be done with Tomiko and mandokoro Ise Sadamune's support.

Like Masamoto, Sadamune was in contact with Hatakeyama Motoie's retainers and the daimyo participating in the Kawachi campaign, as well as the shogun's immediate followers, who deserted Yoshiki due to forged documents, the exact wording of which is unknown. Furthermore, it is recorded that, a month before the incident, Motoie was told of a plot to overthrow the shogun, so Sadamune was already laying the groundwork to support Yoshitō. Sadamune's actions contributed greatly to the coup's success, as Yoshitō declared that he would entrust all government affairs to Sadamune.

== Works cited ==
- Arai, Hakuseki (1982). Lessons from History: The Yoron Tokushi. Translated by Ackroyd, J. I. St Lucia, Queensland: University of Queensland Press. ISBN 978-0-70-221485-1.
- Conlan, Thomas D. (2024). "Yoshioki and the Apogee of Ōuchi Rule (1495–1528)". Kings in All but Name. pp. 242–291. doi:10.1093/oso/9780197677339.003.0009. ISBN 978-0-19-767733-9.
- Gahō, Hayashi (1834). Nipon o Daï Itsi Ran, ou Annales des Empereurs du Japon [The Table of the Rulers of Japan, or the Annals of the Emperors of Japan] (in French). Translated by Titsingh, Isaac. Introduction and Mythological History by Julius Klaproth (1st ed.). Paris: Oriental Translation Fund.
- Jinson. Daijō'in Jisha Zōjiki 大乗院寺社雑事記 [Miscellaneous Records of the Daijō'in Shrines and Temples] (in Japanese). Daijō'in.
- Kanroji, Chikanaga (1499). Chikanaga Kyōki 親長卿記 [State Minister Chikanaga's Records] (in Japanese). ndlpid:1229789.
- Yamada, Yasuhiro (2016). Ashikaga Yoshitane -Sengoku ni Ikita Fukutsu no Daishōgun- 足利義稙 -戦国に生きた不屈の大将軍- [Ashikaga Yoshitane: The Persistent Taishōgun of the Sengoku] (in Japanese). Ebisu-Kōshō Publishing.
