= Horigoe Gosho =

Archaeological site Shizuoka, Japan

Horigoe Palace ruins
- 堀越御所跡 (Japanese)
- Horigoe Palace ruins Horigoe Gosho (Japan)
- 35°2′54.6″N 138°56′17.6″E
- Type: settlement
- Periods: Muromachi period
- Location: Izunokuni, Shizuoka, Japan
- Region: Tōkai region

Site notes
- Public access: Yes (no public facilities)

The Horigoe Palace site (堀越御所跡, Horigoe Gosho ato) is an archaeological site containing the ruins of the Muromachi period residence of the Ashikaga clan in the Jike neighborhood of the city of Izunokuni, Shizuoka in the Tōkai region of Japan. The site was designated a National Historic Site of Japan in 1984, with the area under protection extended in 1987. The name is also sometimes transliterated as "Horigoshi Gosho".

== Background ==
In 1439 Shōgun Ashikaga Yoshinori invaded Kamakura to enforce the authority of the central government, forcing Ashikaga Mochiuji and his eldest son to commit seppuku His three younger sons escaped and were sheltered by the Yūki clan at Koga, Shimōsa Province. The shogunate later attacked Koga, capturing and killing two of the sons, with only the youngest, Eijuō-maru, surviving The shogunate then appointed the Uesugi clan to rule the Kantō region until 1449.

In that same year, Eijuō-maru's uncle Ōi Mochimitsu managed to have him appointed to the post of Kantō kubō, nominally the Shōgun's deputy in the Kantō region, and Eijuō-maru changed his name to Ashikaga Shigeuji. However, Shōgun Ashikaga Yoshimasa, not trusting Shigeuji, nominated his ally Uesugi Noritada as kanrei with the task of keeping him informed of whatever was happening in Kamakura. The relationship between the two men, already difficult because of the role the Uesugi clan had had in Ashikaga Mochiuji's death, was therefore strained from the beginning. Tension culminated with Shigeuji's 1454 killing of Uesugi Noritada, who was invited to Shigeuji's mansion where he was murdered. This killing caused the Kantō region to fall into chaos as all of the Uesugi vassals rose in revolt against Shigeuji. This conflict was later known as the Kyōtoku Incident.

Shogunal forces led by Imagawa Noritada defeated Shigeuji at Kamakura in 1455 and he fled back Koga, where he later became known as the Koga kubō. The Uesugi clan asked Ashikaga Yoshimasa to send someone to replace Shigeuji, so Yoshimasa sent his younger brother, Ashikaga Masatomo, from Kyoto. However, as many clans in the Kantō region remained loyal to Shigeuji and suspicious of the intentions of the Kyoto-based shogunate, Masatomo found that he was unable to even enter Kamakura. Instead, he set up his headquarters in Horigoe in Izu Province, which was thereafter known as the Horigoe Gosho. Thus, per the historian George Bailey Sansom, the Kantō therefore found itself with two rulers, one in Koga and one in Horigoe, neither of whom was able to rule.

The precise site of the Horigoe Gosho was not certain for many years, but was by tradition held to be at this location due to its local place names of "Goshonouchi" and "Tsukiyama". Archaeological excavations in 2007 and 2008 found the foundations of a large structure and the remains of a garden with ponds, along with pottery shards, some of which was very high status ceramics which had been imported from China, indicating the presence of a Muromachi-period palace, confirming that the Horigoe Palace was most likely at this location.

The site was backfilled after excavation and is now an empty field. It is about a 15-minute walk from Nirayama Station on the Izuhakone Railway.

== See also ==
- List of Historic Sites of Japan (Shizuoka)
