= Kyōtoku incident =

Series of conflicts in 15th century Japan

Kyōtoku incident 享徳の乱
- Part of the end of the Muromachi period
Date	1454–1482
Location	Kantō region, Japan
Result	Peace negotiated.

Belligerents
Ashikaga clan	Uesugi clan, Imagawa clan

Commanders and leaders
Ashikaga Shigeuji	Imagawa Noritada

The Kyōtoku incident (享徳の乱, Kyōtoku no Ran) was a long series of skirmishes and conflicts fought for control of the Kantō region of Japan in the 15th century. The conflict began in 1454 with the assassination of Uesugi Noritada by Kantō kubō Ashikaga Shigeuji. The Ashikaga, Uesugi, and other clans then leapt to battle, either defending or assaulting Shigeuji. The chaos ended in 1482, when a peace was negotiated.

== Chronology ==
Ashikaga Shigeuji was appointed to the post of Kantō kubō (shōgun's deputy in the Kantō region) in 1449, the first Ashikaga to hold the post since his father's death ten years earlier. At that point, in 1439, Uesugi Norizane had seized power for his clan. Ten years later, the Uesugi remained powerful in the Kantō; in 1454, Shigeuji arranged to have his deputy, Uesugi Noritada, killed.

This was taken as rebellion against the Ashikaga shogunate, and armed conflict quickly broke out. The Uesugi clan mobilized to attack Shigeuji, and Imagawa Noritada, loyal to the shogunate, captured and burned Kamakura, which was the center of the Kantō bureaucracy and Shigeuji's home. Shigeuji then fled the area, to Koga, in Shimotsuke Province, and became known as the Koga kubō. The Uesugi called for the shogunate to send a new kubō to replace Shigeuji, and in 1459, the shōgun's brother, Ashikaga Masatomo, arrived to take up that position. However, Shigeuji's supporters refused to acknowledge this, and maintained Shigeuji's rightful claim to the post. Masatomo set up his new home in Horigoe, in Izu Province. As the fighting continued, both claimed to be on the side of the shogunate; but both sides prevented one another from wielding true power, and so the Uesugi were once again in control of the region.

Due to their growing power and numbers, the Uesugi clan now split in three branches (Yamanouchi, Ōgigayatsu, and Inukake), named after the localities within the Kantō where they resided.

The Ōnin War broke out in Kyoto in 1467, signalling the end of the shogunate's real power and the beginning of the Sengoku period, a period of chaos and war which would last 150 years. Fighting in the Kantō between the Ashikaga and Uesugi calmed for about ten years, resuming in 1477 and ending in 1482, with negotiations for peace.
