= Sengoku period =

Period of Japanese history from 1467 to 1615

The Sengoku period (戦国時代, Sengoku jidai; Japanese pronunciation: [seŋ.ɡo.kɯ (d)ʑiꜜ.dai, -ŋo.kɯ-] lit. 'Warring States period') was the period in Japanese history in which civil wars and social upheavals took place almost continuously in the 15th and 16th centuries. The Kyōtoku incident (1454), Ōnin War (1467), or Meiō incident (1493) are generally chosen as the period's start date, but there are many competing historiographies for its end date, ranging from 1568, the date of Oda Nobunaga's march on Kyoto, to the suppression of the Shimabara Rebellion in 1638, deep into what was traditionally considered the Edo period. Regardless of the dates chosen, the Sengoku period overlaps substantially with the Muromachi period (1336–1573).

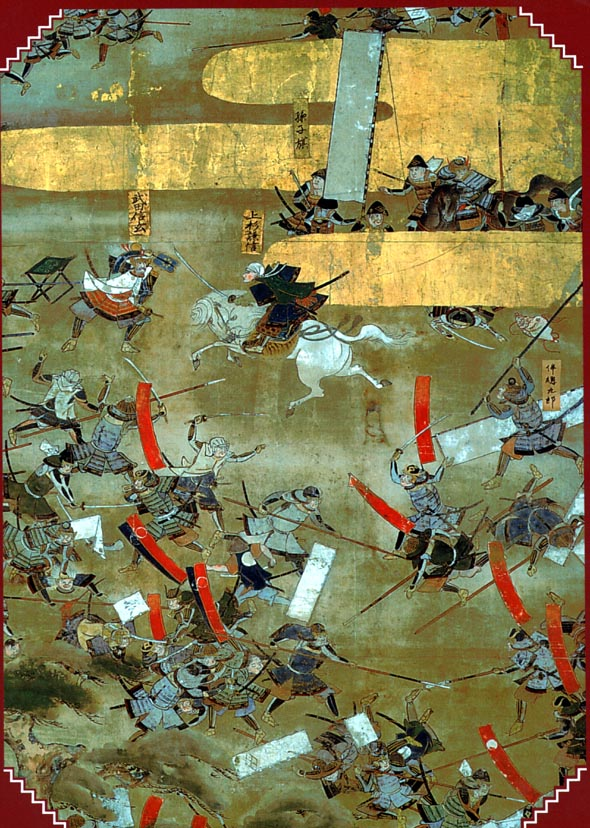
Takeda Shingen deflects Uesugi Kenshin's strike at the fourth Battle of Kawanakajima during the Sengoku period

This period was characterized by the decline of the Ashikaga shogunate, the de facto central government, while the feudal lords (daimyo), acquired greater political influence. The people rebelled against the feudal lords in revolts known as Ikkō-ikki (Ikkō-shū uprising).

The period saw a breakdown in the traditional master-servant relationship between a lord and his vassals, with many instances of vassals rebelling against their lords, internal dynastic conflict over lordships within noble families (in which vassals would take sides), and the installation of figurehead lords by cadet branches of noble families. The period was also marked by the loosening of samurai culture, with people born into other social strata sometimes making a name for themselves as warriors and thus becoming samurai. In turn, events sometimes allowed common samurai to rise to the rank of sengoku daimyo; these included Hōjō Sōun (the first to do so), and Uesugi Kenshin, a shugodai (deputy shugo) who attained power by weakening and eventually replacing his lord. The most spectacular example of a sengoku-era rise is often considered to be that of Toyotomi Hideyoshi, who rose from a peasant background to successively become a samurai, sengoku daimyo, and kampaku (Imperial Regent).

Modern Japan recognizes Oda Nobunaga, Toyotomi Hideyoshi, and Tokugawa Ieyasu as the "three great unifiers" (三英傑) for their restoration of Japan's central government.

== Background ==
During this period, although the Emperor of Japan was officially the ruler of the state and every lord swore loyalty to him, he was largely a marginalized, ceremonial, and religious figure who delegated power to the shōgun, a noble who was roughly equivalent to a military dictator.

From 1346 to 1358, during the Nanboku-cho period, the Ashikaga shogunate gradually expanded the authority of the shugo, the local military and police officials established by the Kamakura shogunate, giving the shugo jurisdiction over land disputes between gokenin and allowing the shugo to receive half of all taxes from the areas they controlled. The Shugo shared their newfound wealth with the local samurai, creating a hierarchical relationship between the shugo and the samurai, and the first early daimyo, called shugo daimyo, appeared.

In 1428, Ashikaga Yoshimochi, the fourth Ashikaga shogun, was ill and the question of his succession arose. Ashikaga Yoshikazu, the 5th Ashikaga shogun, died of illness at the age of 19, so the 6th Ashikaga shogun was chosen from among Yoshimochi's four brothers, and to ensure fairness, a lottery was held. The sixth Ashikaga shogun was Ashikaga Yoshinori. He was not educated to be shogun, and his temperamental and despotic behaviour caused resentment. Akamatsu Mitsusuke assassinated him during the Kakitsu Rebellion. This led to instability in the Ashikaga shogunate system. The shogunate gradually lost influence and control over the daimyo.

== Beginning of the Sengoku period ==
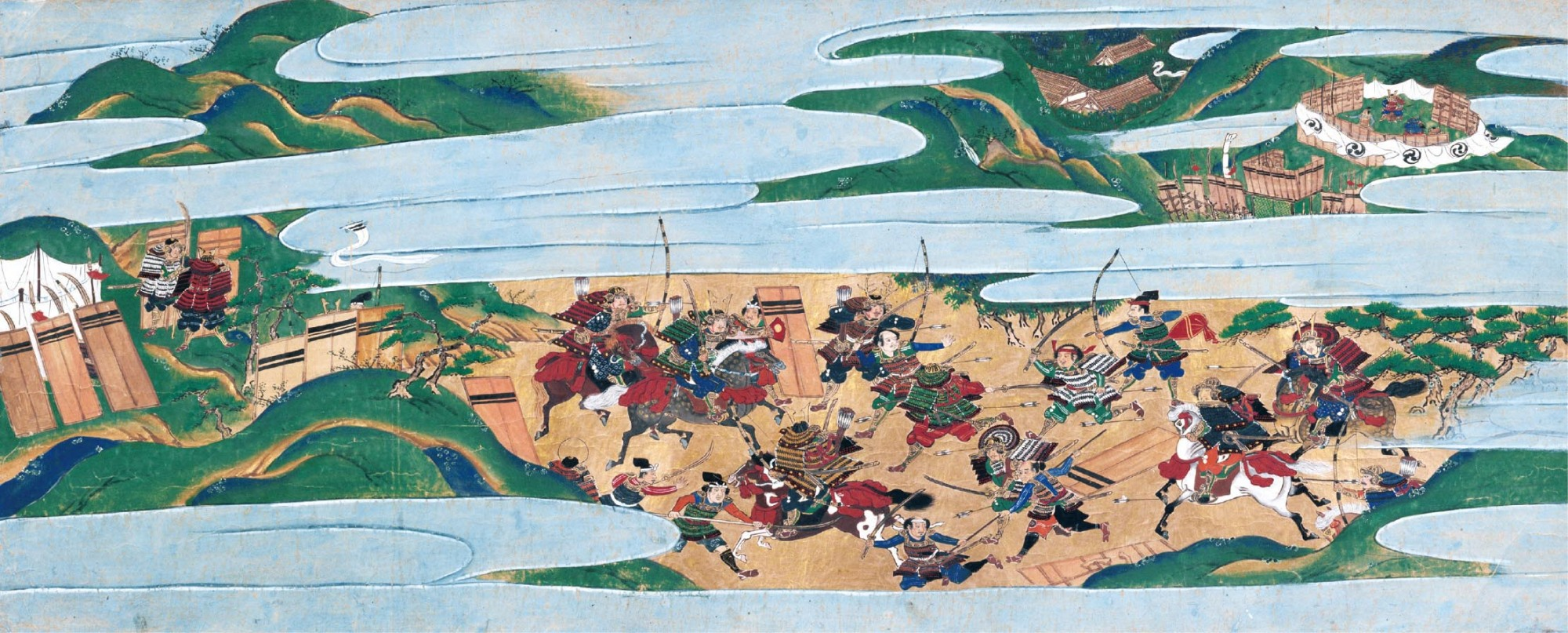
Painting depicting a battle during the Ōnin War

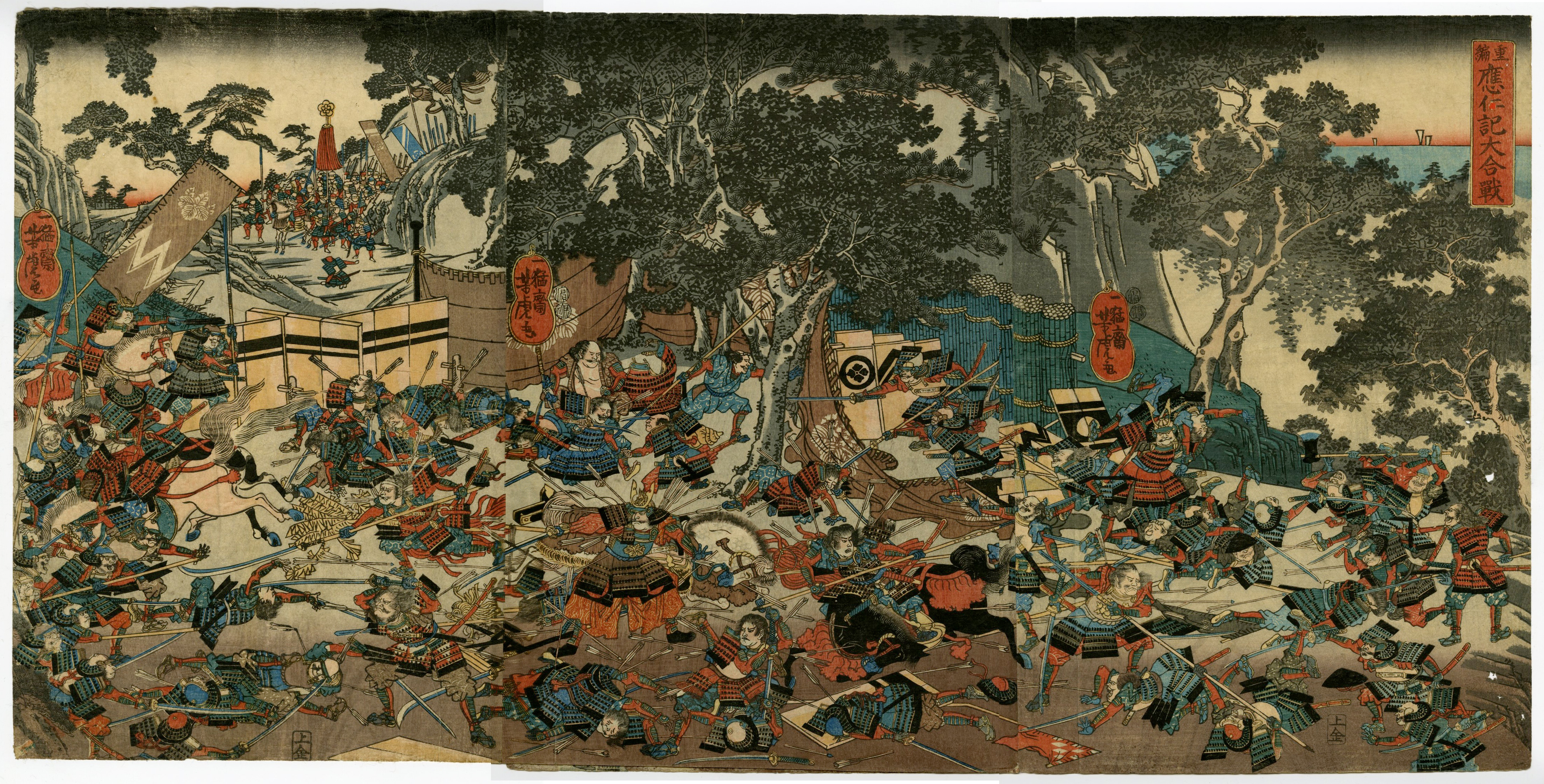
19th century ukiyo-e by Utagawa Yoshitora, depicting a battle of the war

The beginning of the Sengoku Period is considered to be the Kyōtoku incident, Ōnin War, or Meiō incident.

The Kyōtoku Incident was a major war in the Kanto region that lasted from 1454 to 1482. The war began when Ashikaga Shigeuji of Kantō kubō, the office of the Ashikaga shogunate in charge of the Kanto region, killed Uesugi Noritada of Kantō Kanrei, Kantō kubō's assistant. The various forces in the Kanto region divided and fought between the Kubō and Kanrei sides, with the Ashikaga shogunate supporting the Kanrei side.

Ashikaga Yoshimasa, the 8th Ashikaga shogun, tried to strengthen the power of the shogun, but his close associates did not follow his instructions, leading to political chaos and increasing social unrest. Since he had no sons, he tried to install his younger brother Ashikaga Yoshimi as the ninth shogun, but when his wife Hino Tomiko gave birth to Ashikaga Yoshihisa, a conflict arose among the shugo daimyo as to whether Yoshimi or Yoshihisa would be the next shogun. The Hatakeyama and Shiba clans were also divided into two opposing factions over succession within their own clans, and Hosokawa Katsumoto and Yamana Sōzen, who were father-in-law and son-in-law, were politically at odds with each other.

In 1467, these conflicts finally led to the Ōnin War (1467–1477) between the Eastern Army, led by Hosokawa Katsumoto and including Hatakeyama Masanaga, Shiba Yoshitoshi, and Ashikaga Yoshimi, and the Western Army, led by Yamana Sōzen and including Hatakeyama Yoshinari, Shiba Yoshikado, and Ashikaga Yoshihisa. In 1469, the war spread to the provinces, but in 1473, Hosokawa Katsumoto and Yamana Sōzen, the leaders of both armies, died. In 1477, the war ended when the western lords, including Hatakeyama Yoshinari and Ōuchi Masahiro, withdrew their armies from Kyoto.

The war devastated two-thirds of Kyoto, destroying many aristocratic and samurai residences, Shinto shrines, and Buddhist temples, and undermining the authority of the Ashikaga shoguns, greatly reducing their control over the various regions. The war caused disarray which rippled across Japan. In addition to the military confrontations between separate states, there was also domestic fallout. In contempt of the shogunate, the daimyo who were subjected to remain in Kyoto instead returned to their provinces. Consequentially, some of these daimyo found that their designated retainers or shugodai, representatives of their states appointed in a daimyo's absence, rose in power either to seize control of the domain or proclaim independence as a separate domain.

Thus began the Sengoku period, a period of civil war in which the daimyo of various regions fought to expand their own power. Daimyo who became more powerful as the shogunate's control weakened were called sengoku daimyo, and they often came from shugo daimyo, shugodai, and kokujin or kunibito (国人, local masters). In other words, sengoku daimyo differed from shugo daimyo in that a sengoku daimyo was able to rule the region on his own, without being appointed by the shogun.

Historians often consider the Ōnin War, a ten-year conflict wrought by political turmoil, to be the trigger for what would come to be known as the Sengoku period. This civil war would clearly reveal the Ashikaga shogunate's reduced authority over its shogunal administration, the provincial daimyo and Japan as a whole; thereby a wave of unbridled conflict would spread across Japan and consume the states in an age of war. Furthermore, weariness of war, socioeconomic unrest and poor treatment by aristocrats provoked the wrath of the peasant class. Farmers, craftsmen, merchants and even villages would organize uprisings (known as "ikki") against the ruling class. An extraordinary example is the Kaga Rebellion, in which the local ikki had staged a large-scale revolt with the support of the True Pure Land sect (thereby establishing the term ikkō ikki) and assumed control of the entire province of Kaga. It is suggested by both scholars and authors that "these succession disputes still might not have led to war were it not for the shōgun's lack of leadership."

== Timeline ==
=== Start and end dates ===
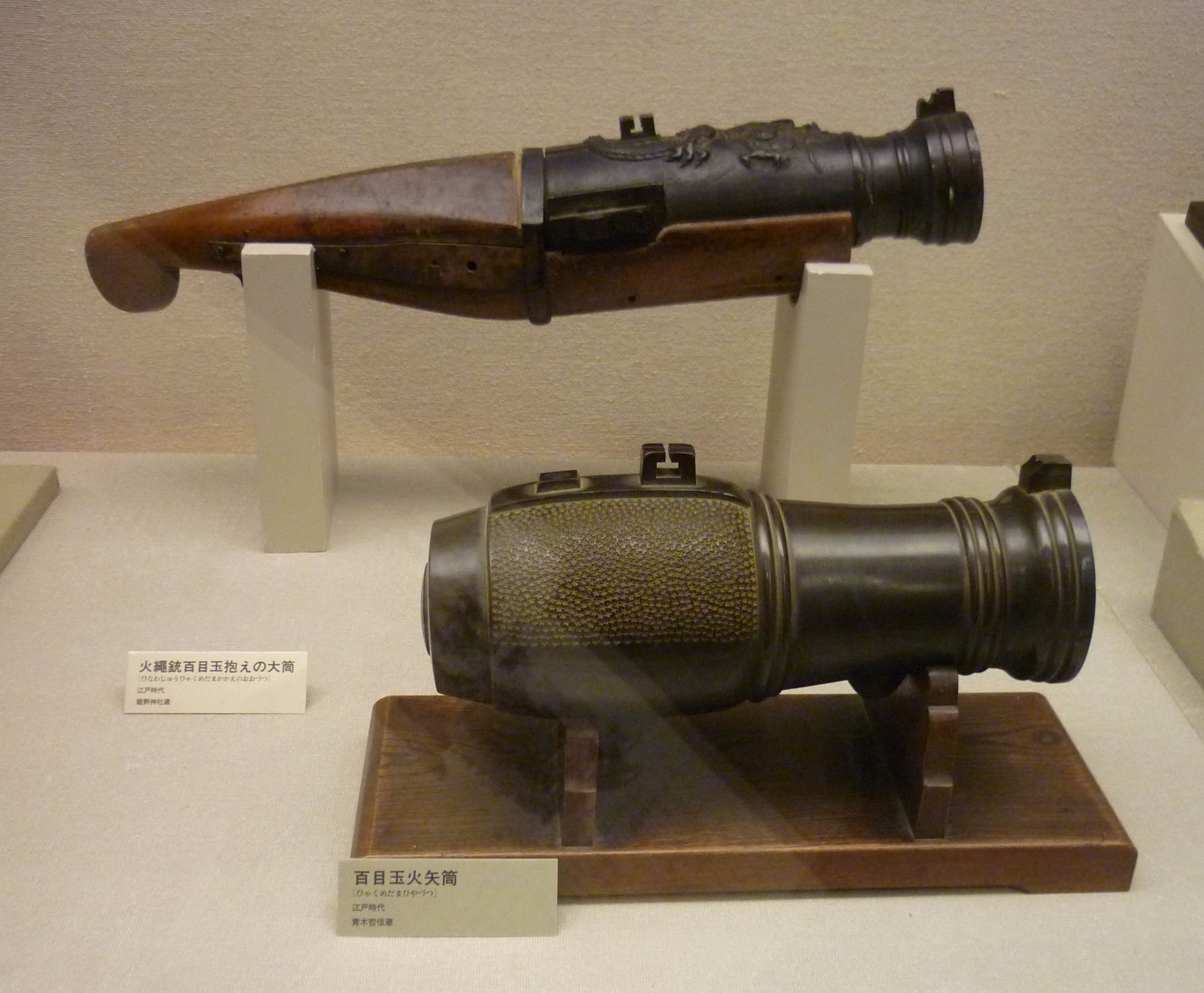
Ōzutsu (Big Gun)

The Kyōtoku incident in 1454, Ōnin War in 1467, or Meiō incident in 1493 is usually considered the starting point of the Sengoku period. There are several events which could be considered the end of it: Nobunaga's entry to Kyoto (1568) or abolition of the Muromachi shogunate (1573) or entry into Azuchi Castle (1576), Hideyoshi's promulgation of the Sōbujirei law prohibiting war (1587), the siege of Odawara (1590), the Battle of Sekigahara (1600), the establishment of the Tokugawa shogunate (1603), the siege of Osaka (1615), or the suppression of the Shimabara Rebellion (1638). The old, well-known definition is that the Onin War initiated the Sengoku period in 1467; and that it ended in 1568, when Oda Nobunaga entered Kyoto in support of Ashikaga Yoshiaki.

Japanese screen depicting the Battle of Sekigahara (1600)

However, even if 1568 is the end date of the Sengoku period, there are also various theories about the beginning and end dates of the following Azuchi-Momoyama period. The Azuchi-Momoyama period refers to the period when Oda Nobunaga and Toyotomi Hideyoshi were in power. They and Tokugawa Ieyasu are the three unifiers of Japan. The name "Azuchi-Momoyama" comes from the fact that Nobunaga's castle, Azuchi Castle, was located in Azuchi, Shiga, and Fushimi Castle, where Hideyoshi lived after his retirement, was located in Momoyama. The beginning date could be either when Oda Nobunaga entered Kyoto in 1568 to support Ashikaga Yoshiaki, or when Nobunaga expelled Ashikaga Yoshiaki from Kyoto in 1573 and destroyed the Muromachi Shogunate, or when Nobunaga moved to Azuchi Castle in 1576. It ended either when Toyotomi Hideyoshi died in 1598, or at the Battle of Sekigahara in 1600, or with the opening of the Tokugawa shogunate in 1603.

Kaga ikki occurred in 1488, Hōjō Sōun conquered Izu province in 1491, and in 1492 Hosokawa Masamoto banished the 10th shogun Ashikaga Yoshitane from Kyoto and installed Ashikaga Yoshizumi as the 11th shogun. Around this time, civil wars began to occur frequently throughout the country, and Buddhist temples in various regions grew as armed forces.

=== Kansai region and Kyoto ===
==== Creation of the puppet Ashikaga Shogunate by the Hosokawa clan ====
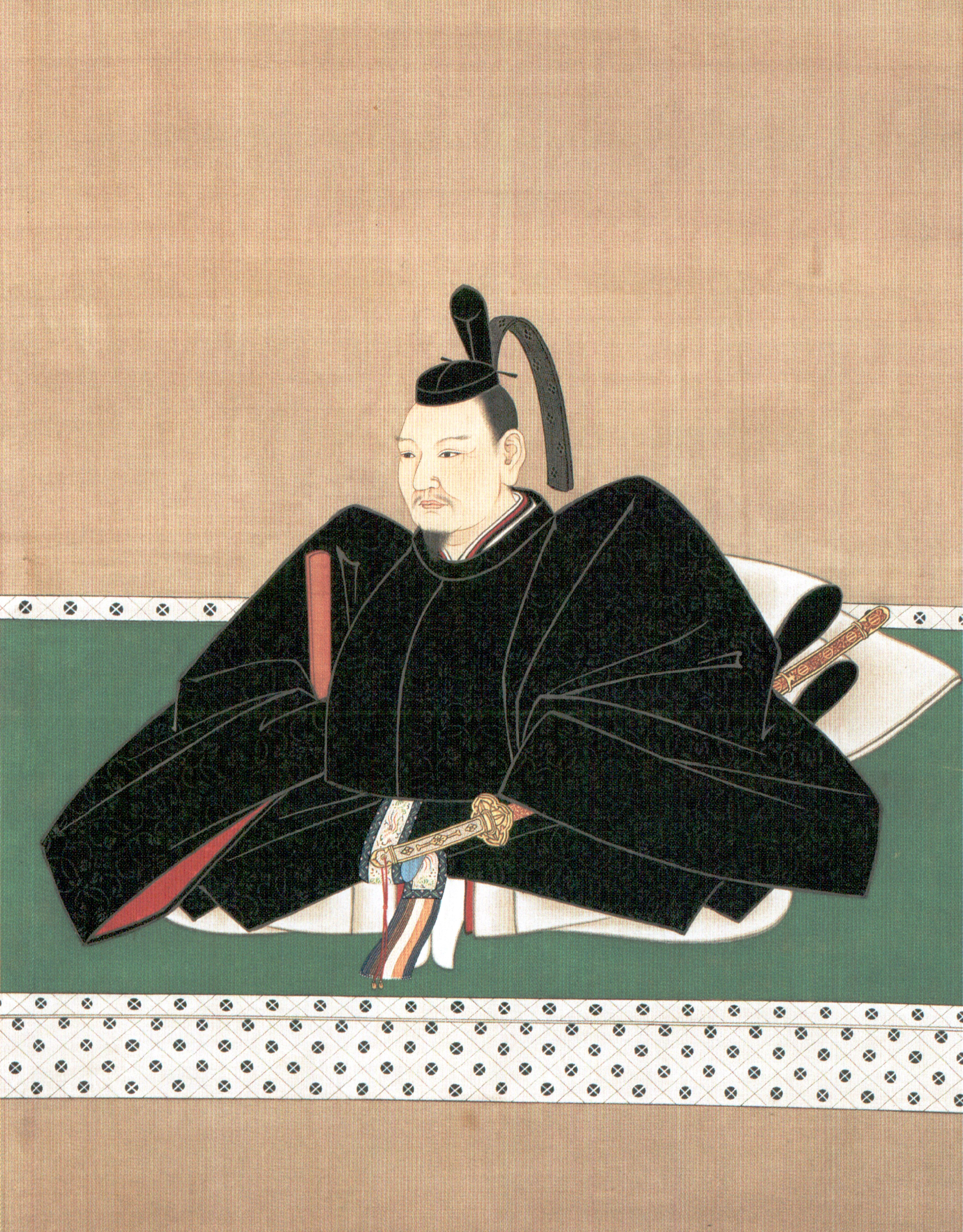
Hosokawa Masamoto

Ashikaga Yoshihisa, who had become the ninth shogun during the Onin War, died at the age of 25, and Ashikaga Yoshitane became the 10th shogun. However, in 1493, Hosokawa Masamoto raised an army while shogun Yoshitane was away in Kyoto and installed the 11th shogun, Ashikaga Yoshizumi, in a de facto coup known as the Meiō incident (明応の政変). Masamoto held the position of Kanrei, second only to the shogun in the Ashikaga shogunate, and the equivalent of Shikken in the Kamakura shogunate. This made the shogun a puppet of the Hosokawa clan, which served as the Kanrei. In recent years, it has been theorized that this incident marked the beginning of the Sengoku period.

Hosokawa Masamoto remained a bachelor for the rest of his life and adopted three people as his heirs. Following the advice of his vassals, Masamoto named Hosokawa Sumimoto as his successor instead of Hosokawa Sumiyuki, who had been adopted first. As a result, Masamoto was killed by Sumiyuki in 1507. This incident is called Eishō no sakuran (永正の錯乱, Eishō delirium). This triggered a struggle for the succession of the Hosokawa clan, which was divided into the Hosokawa Sumimoto faction and the Hosokawa Takakuni faction, and started a war called Ryō Hosokawa War (両細川の乱), which was won by Hosokawa Takakuni.

Hosokawa Takakuni installed Ashikaga Yoshiharu as the 12th shogun. Meanwhile, Hosokawa Harumoto, son of Hosokawa Sumimoto, who had lost the war, collaborated with Miyoshi Motonaga to defeat Takakuni at the Battle of Katsuragawa (桂川の戦い) in 1527 and expel him from Kyoto. The authority of the Kanrei was thus destroyed, and with almost no support for Hosokawa Takakuni, he was forced to move from place to place. He gained the sengoku daimyo Uragami Muramune as an ally and fought Hosokawa Harumoto in a war called Daimotsu kuzure (大物崩れ) in 1531, but was defeated.

Hosokawa Harumoto seized power, but he alienated Miyoshi Motonaga, who was his retainer but still held a strong position of power. Harumoto seduced the Ikkō-shū into a Ikkō-ikki against Motonaga, which resulted in Motonaga's death in 1532.

==== The rise of the Miyoshi clan ====
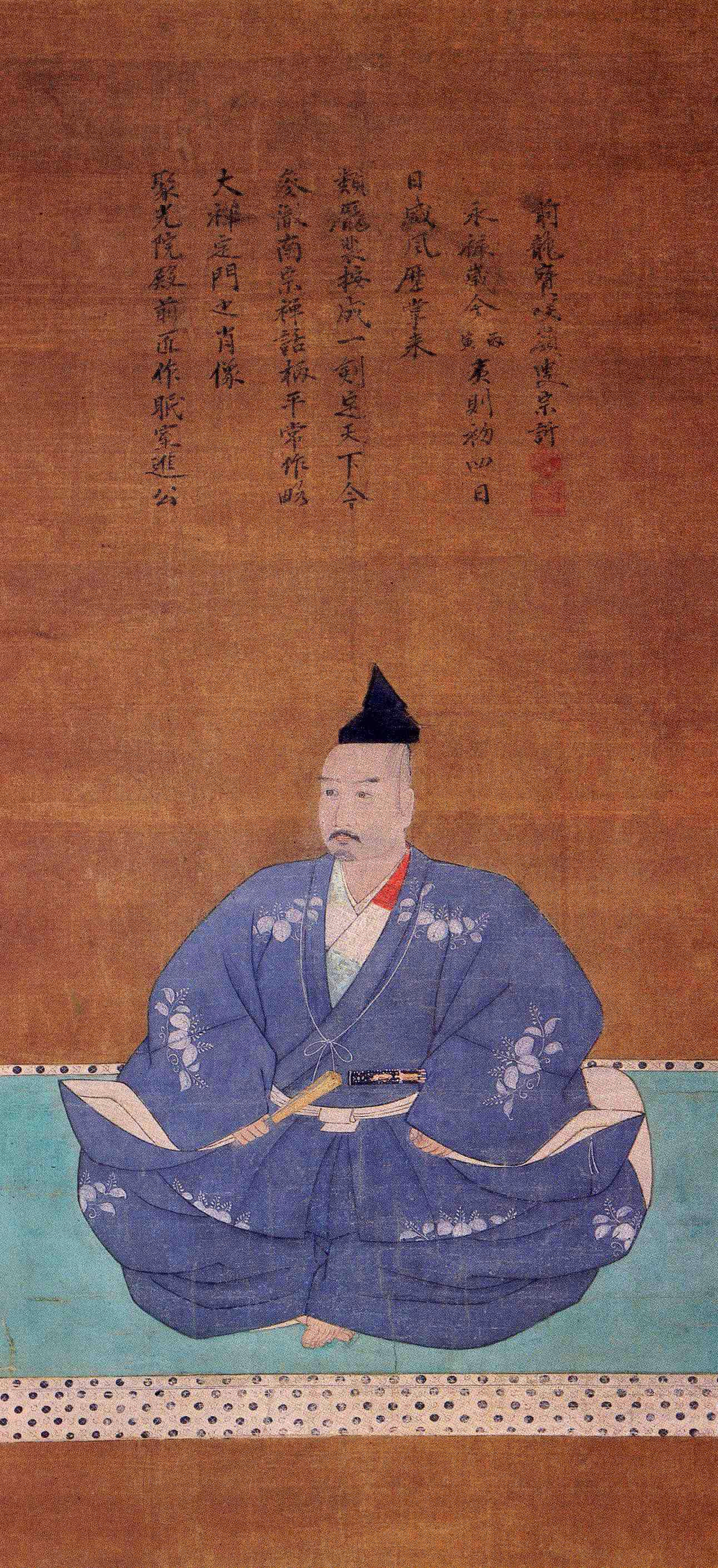
Miyoshi Nagayoshi

Miyoshi Motonaga's son, Miyoshi Nagayoshi, fought against Hosokawa Harumoto, but chose to subordinate himself to Harumoto. As a follower of Harumoto, Miyoshi Nagayoshi defeated Kizawa Nagamasa, the most powerful member of the Hatakeyama clan who served as Kanrei, and in 1547 defeated the 12th shogun, Ashikaga Yoshiharu and Hosokawa Ujitsuna, son of Hosokawa Takakuni, in the Battle of Shari-ji (舎利寺の戦い). This further reduced the power of the Ashikaga Shogunate. Miyoshi Nagayoshi was told by a retainer of the Hosokawa family that Miyoshi Masanaga had played a dark role in his father's death, and he petitioned his lord Hosokawa Harumoto to overthrow Masanaga, but this petition was not accepted, and, in turn, Nagayoshi was almost eliminated by Harumoto. In response, Miyoshi Nagayoshi attacked and defeated Miyoshi Masanaga, expelled Hosokawa Harumoto, Ashikaga Yoshiharu, the 12th shogun, and his son Ashikaga Yoshiteru from Kyoto, and established control over the Kyoto area in 1549. After that, he fought several times against Ashikaga Yoshiteru, who became the 13th shogun, for control of the Kyoto area. However, one by one, his sons died in war or from disease, and the Miyoshi clan began to decline rapidly.

By the time of the 13th shogun, Ashikaga Yoshiteru, the shogun already had few direct fiefs and direct military forces, and his sphere of influence was limited to a few lands around Kyoto, losing both economic and military power. As a result, Ashikaga Yoshiteru was often chased out of Kyoto by the sengoku daimyo Miyoshi Nagayoshi and his forces, and was finally killed in an attack by the forces of Miyoshi Yoshitsugu and Matsunaga Hisahide. Ashikaga Yoshiteru was known as a great swordsman and was a student of Tsukahara Bokuden, who was known as one of the strongest swordsmen. According to Yagyū Munenori, a swordsmanship instructor in the Tokugawa Shogunate, Ashikaga Yoshiteru was one of the five best swordsmen of his time. According to several historical books, including Luís Fróis' Historia de Japam, he fought hard with naginata and tachi during a raid, defeating many of his enemies, but eventually ran out of strength and was killed.

The trio (三好三人衆) of Miyoshi Nagayasu, Miyoshi Soui, and Iwanari Tomomichi supported the young head of the clan, Miyoshi Yoshitsugu, in leading the Miyoshi clan. However, after the assassination of the 13th Shogun, the trio fell out with another Miyoshi follower, Matsunaga Hisashige, over the 14th Shogun, Ashikaga Yoshihide, and war broke out. The latter three also came into conflict with Yoshitsugu. The Miyoshi regime virtually collapsed when Oda Nobunaga entered Kyoto in 1568. Miyoshi Yoshitugu and Matsunaga Hisahide submitted to Nobunaga, but were later killed by Nobunaga's forces. The trio was weakened and the Miyoshi clan declined.

=== Other regions ===
==== Chūgoku region (Mōri Motonari) ====
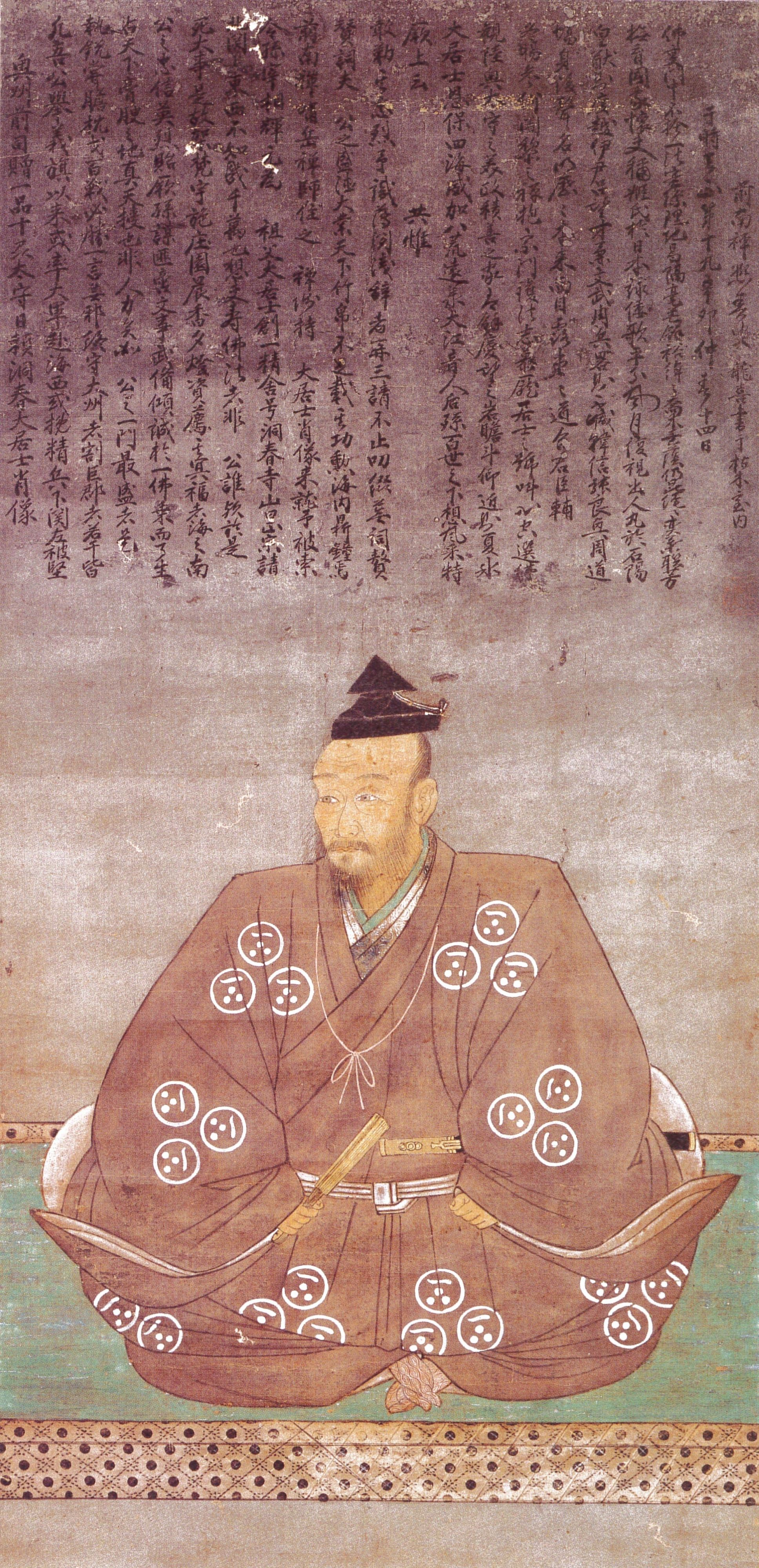
Mōri Motonari

Mōri Motonari was a sengoku daimyo who pacified the Chūgoku region and is famous for his parable of the "Three Arrows", which explains the importance of clan unity. In his first battle, the Battle of Arita-Nakaide in 1517, he defeated the overwhelming majority of the Aki-Takeda clan with a small force, which later became known as the "Battle of Okehazama in the West" as a battle in which a small force defeated a large army. Motonari became head of the Mōri clan in 1523 at the age of 27. The Amago and Ōuchi clans were sharing power in the Chūgoku region at the time, and he switched the Mōri clan's allegiance from the Amago to the Ōuchi clan in 1525. Motonari destroyed the Takahashi clan by 1535 and ruled Aki Province, Iwami Province, and Bingo Province, and destroyed the Aki-Takeda clan at the siege of Yoshida-Kōriyama Castle in 1541. Motonaga adopted his sons into the Kikkawa clan and Kobayakawa clans to expand the power of the Mōri clan, and the three clans cooperated with each other. In 1554, Motonaga became independent of the Ōuchi clan, and after inciting the Ōuchi clan to internal divisions through political maneuvering, he defeated Sue Harukata, who had been in control of the Ōuchi clan, at the Battle of Itsukushima in 1555, and defeated Ōuchi Yoshinaga in 1557, destroying the Ōuchi clan and pacifying Nagato and Suou provinces. Motonari destroyed the Amago clan at the siege of Gassantoda Castle in 1567, and then pacified Izumo, Oki, and Hōki Provinces, thus pacifying the Chūgoku region, and later extended his power to parts of Shikoku. He died in 1571 at the age of 75.

==== Hokuriku, Kantō, and Chūbu regions (Uesugi Kenshin) ====
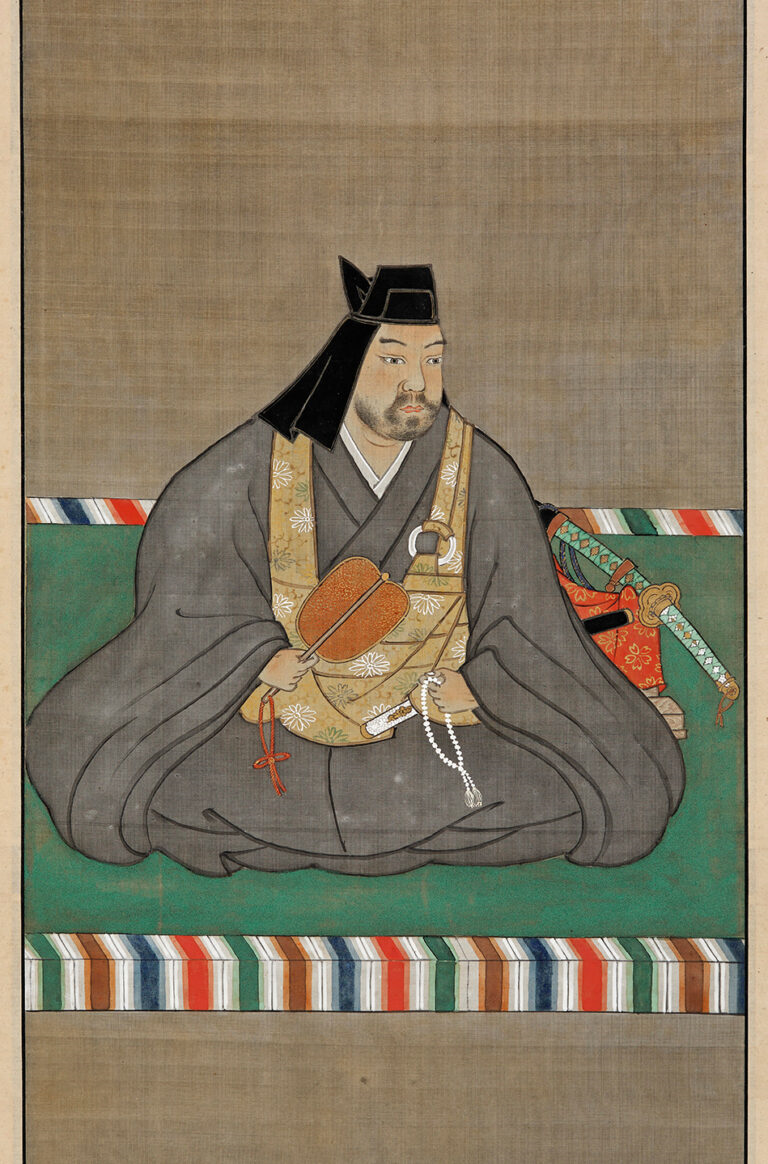
Uesugi Kenshin

In 1546, Hōjō Ujiyasu defeated Uesugi Tomosada at the siege of Kawagoe Castle, and the Later Hōjō clan established its power in the Kantō region.

Uesugi Kenshin (Nagao Kagetora) was a sengoku daimyo based in Echigo Province who fought various sengoku daimyo and increased his power through aggressive invasions. After unifying Echigo in 1551, he invaded the Kantō region several times from 1552 to 1569 and fought against Hōjō Ujiyasu. He also invaded the territory of Takeda Shingen, who ruled Kai and Shinano Provinces from 1553 to 1573, and fought in the Battle of Kawanakajima five times between 1553 and 1564. In 1559, Kenshin had an audience with Emperor Ōgimachi and the 13th Shogun, Ashikaga Yoshiteru. When Imagawa Yoshimoto was killed by Oda Nobunaga's forces at the Battle of Okehazama in 1560, the Alliance Kai-Sagami-Suruga formed in 1554 between Takeda Shingen in Kai, Hojo Ujiyasu in Sagami, and Imagawa Yoshimoto in Suruga was broken. Kenshin used this as an opportunity to seize Hojo Ujiyasu's territories one by one, and cornered the Later Hōjō clan at the siege of Odawara in 1561, but was unable to defeat them. On his return from the siege of Odawara, he performed a ceremony at the Tsurugaoka Hachimangū and assumed the position of kantō kanrei. Kenshin made peace with Hōjō Ujiyasu, who ceded part of his territory to him in 1569, and made Takeda Shingen a common enemy of Kenshin and Ujiyasu, but Shingen died of illness in 1573. After Takeda Shingen's death, he fell out with Oda Nobunaga and destroyed the Noto Hatakeyama clan, which was close to Nobunaga, at the siege of Nanao in 1577, pacifying Noto Province. He then defeated Oda Nobunaga's forces at the Battle of Tedorigawa. However, he died of a cerebral hemorrhage in 1578 at the young age of 49.

=== Social changes with the advent of matchlock guns ===
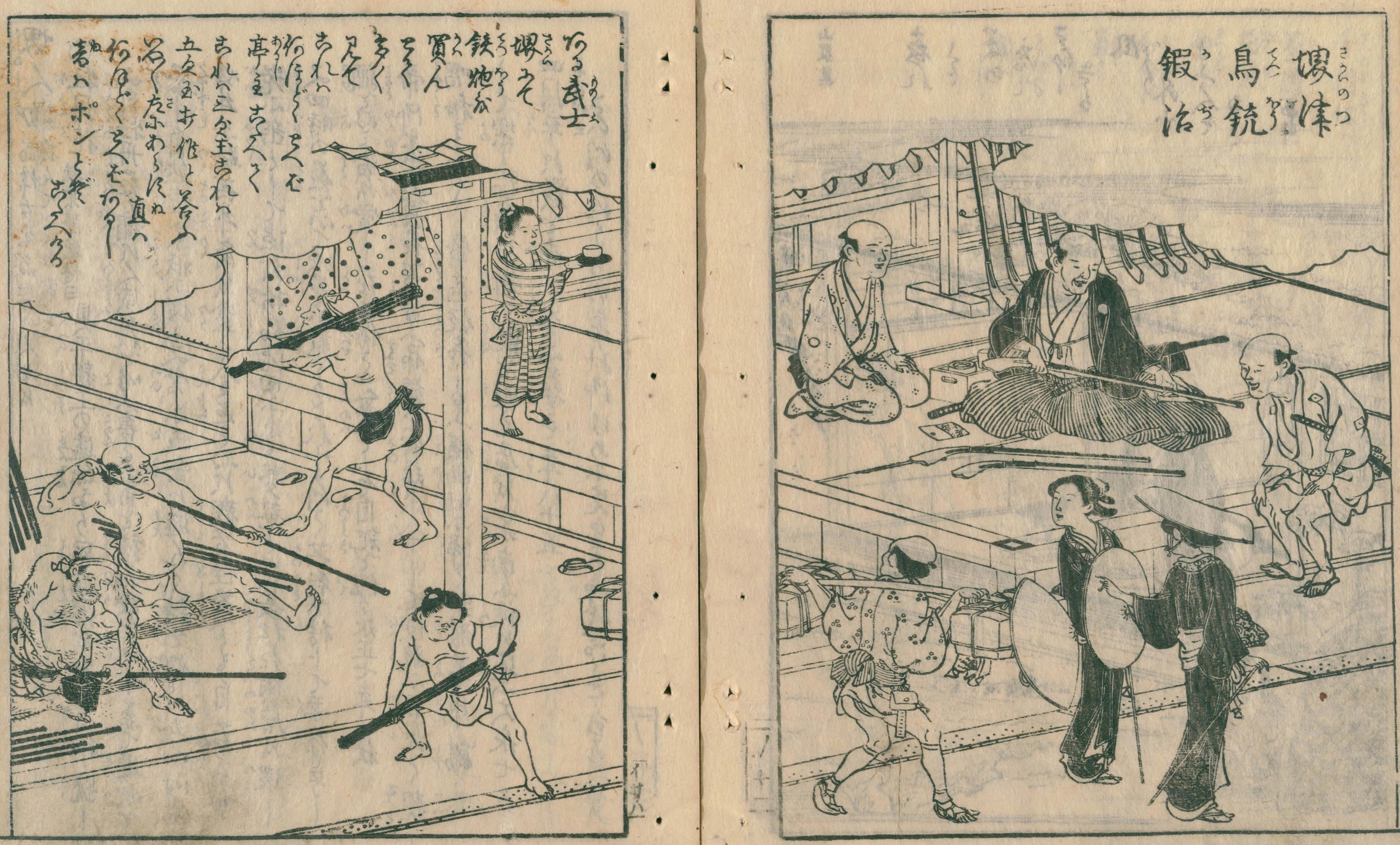
Gunsmith storefront, Sakai, Osaka

When the Portuguese brought the matchlock gun to Japan in 1543, it was mass-produced in Japan, and a gun called the tanegashima began to be used in wars. With the introduction of guns, a standing army of ashigaru (foot soldier) became essential to victory in war, making it impossible for small local lords to remain independent, and lands were consolidated under sengoku daimyo with vast territories, and battles between sengoku daimyo became more intense.

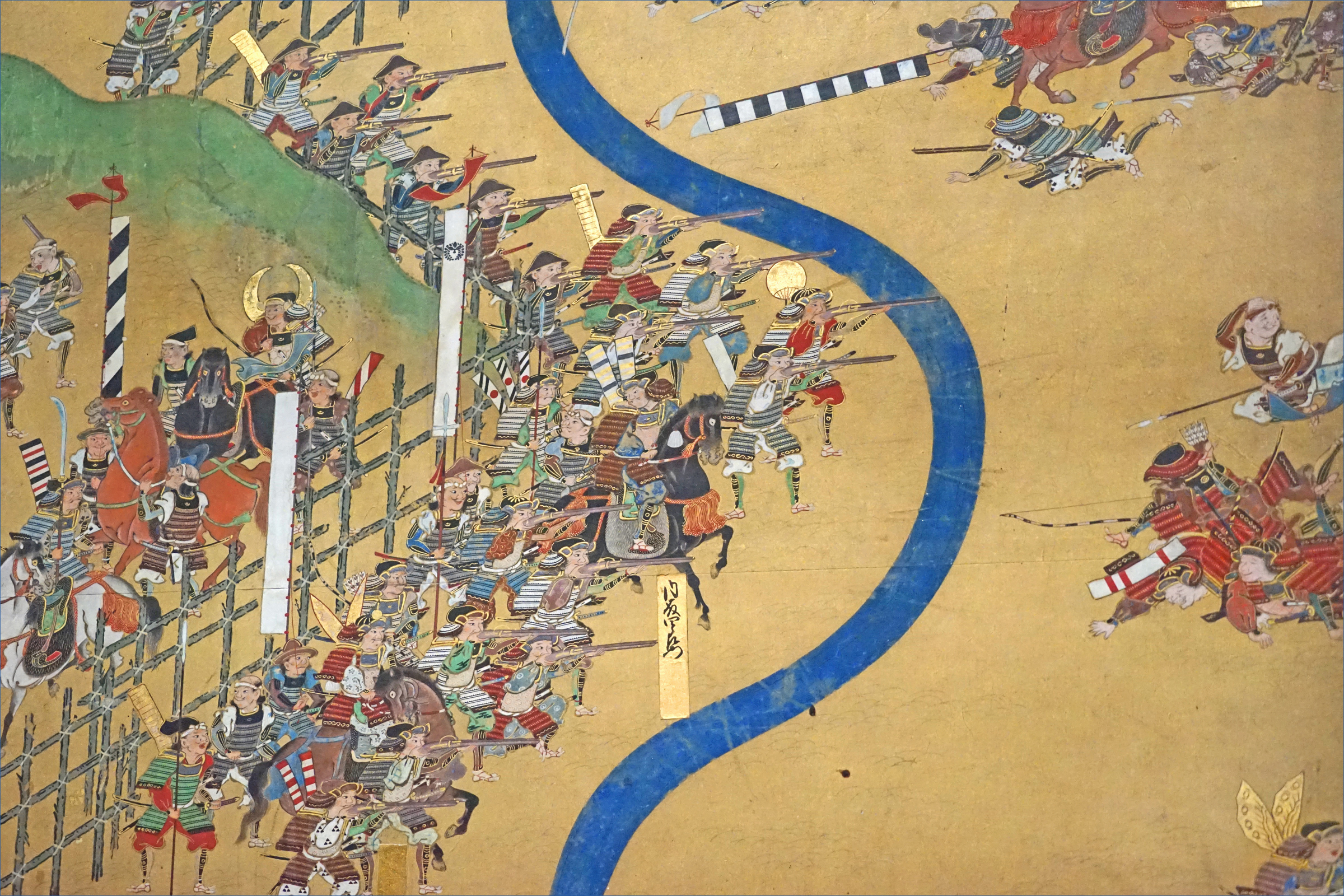
The Battle of Nagashino in 1575. Key to Oda's success during the battle was the deployment of 10,000 Ashigaru arquebusiers.

During this period, the organized use of large numbers of tanegashima (guns) was essential to winning the war. In order for the daimyo to win the war, they had to secure a large number of gunsmiths and arms dealers, import large quantities of lead, the raw material for bullets, and nitre, the raw material for gunpowder, conduct routine marksmanship training, and secure large quantities of materials for building war positions. It was Oda Nobunaga who did this most successfully. He built Azuchi Castle at a strategic distribution point, brought several gunsmithing centers under his control, and established friendly relations with the Portuguese and merchants in Sakai, which had become an international port. He examined the rice yields of the lands under his control and did not allow his retainers to take private ownership of the lands, leaving the management of the lands to his retainers. This made it possible to efficiently change territories according to the performance of the vassals, thus eliminating land disputes. In addition, he made it possible to form a standing army by assigning military service to each region according to rice production. He encouraged the economic activities of the common people. In this way, he rapidly increased his power.

=== Oda Nobunaga ===
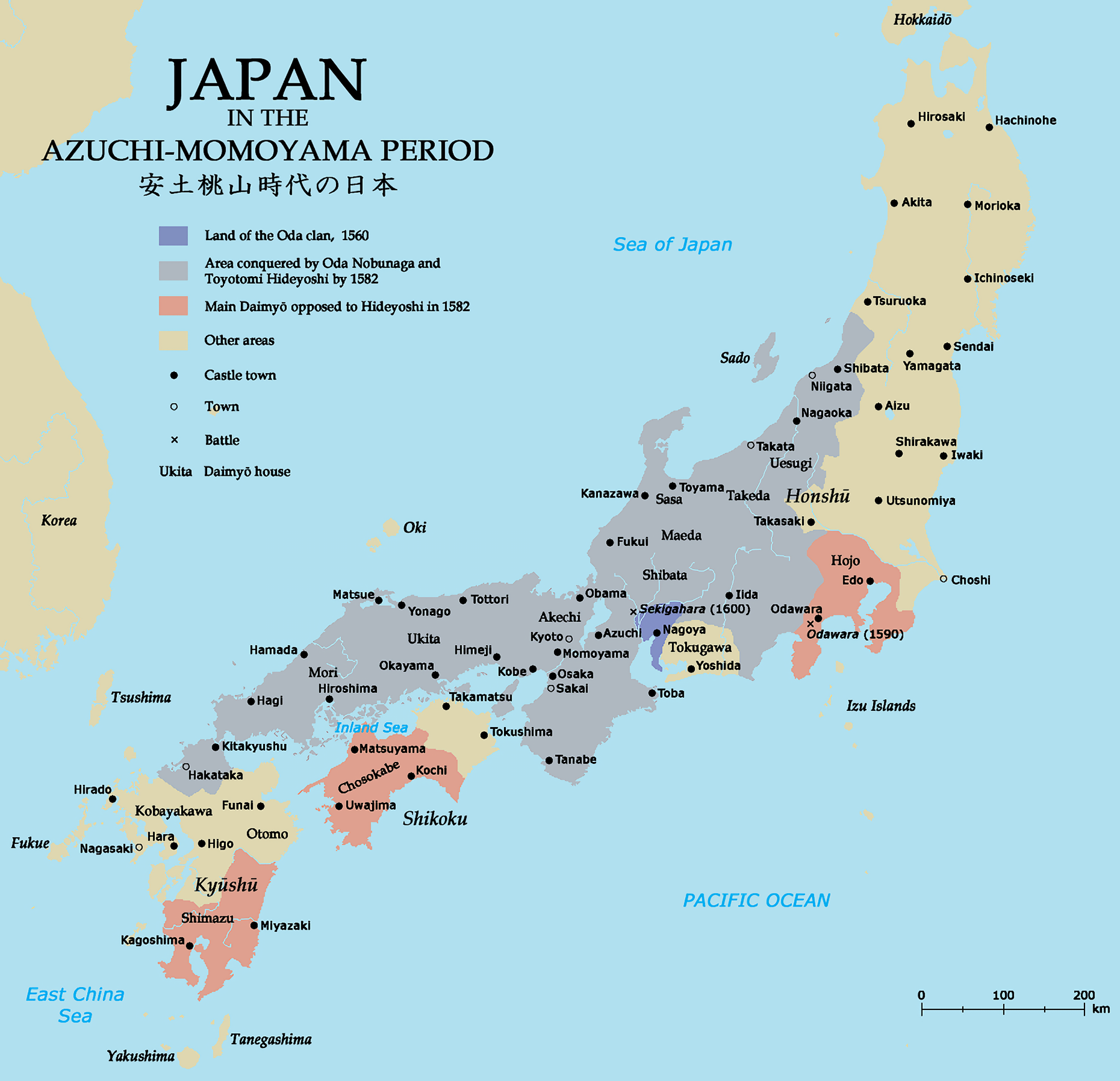
Japan in the late 16th century

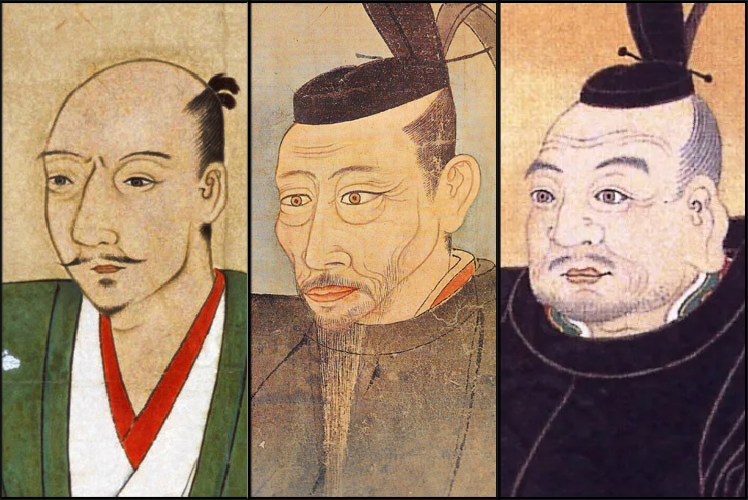
The three unifiers of Japan: from left to right: Oda Nobunaga, Toyotomi Hideyoshi and Tokugawa Ieyasu

In and around the Kinai, the most politically important region in Japan, Oda Nobunaga allied with Tokugawa Ieyasu to increase his power. Nobunaga defeated Imagawa Yoshimoto at the Battle of Okehazama in 1560 and moved to Kyoto in 1568 to support the 15th shogun, Ashikaga Yoshiaki. Nobunaga defeated Miyoshi Yoshitsugu in 1569, laid siege to Mount Hiei in 1571, defeated Asakura Yoshikage at the siege of Ichijōdani Castle in 1573, defeated Asai Nagamasa at the siege of Odani Castle in the same year, and expelled Ashikaga Yoshiaki from Kyoto in 1573, thus destroying the Ashikaga shogunate. He overpowered the Nagashima ikko ikki in 1574, defeated Takeda Katsuyori at the Battle of Nagashino in 1575, and defeated Ishiyama Hongan-ji in the Ishiyama Hongan-ji War in 1580. However, he was betrayed by his vassal Akechi Mitsuhide, who drove him to suicide in the Honnō-ji Incident of 1582.

At the same time, the Mōri clan overthrew the Ouchi clan in the Chūgoku region, and the Shimazu and Otomo clans became major powers in Kyushu. In this way, regional unification was promoted.

=== Toyotomi (Hashiba) Hideyoshi ===
Though a peasant by birth, Toyotomi Hideyoshi had risen through the ranks of ashigaru (足軽, foot soldier), samurai, and sengoku daimyo under Nobunaga to become the most capable general of them all. When he learned that his lord Nobunaga had been killed by Akechi Mitsuhide, he immediately made peace with the Mōri clan, who were in the midst of a battle, and turned his army back faster than anyone could have predicted, defeating Akechi Mitsuhide at the Battle of Yamazaki. Hideyoshi avenged his lord only 11 days after Nobunaga's death. The men who had been Nobunaga's chief vassals discussed future policy at the Kiyosu Conference, and Hideyoshi began his path to becoming Nobunaga's successor. In 1582, Hideyoshi defeated Shibata Katsuie and Oda Nobutaka, who had been enemies over Nobunaga's succession, at the Battle of Shizugatake, and in 1583 he began construction of Osaka Castle. In 1584, he fought bitterly against the allied forces of Tokugawa Ieyasu and Oda Nobuo at the Battle of Komaki and Nagakute, but was able to make a truce with Nobuo by making peace with him. In 1585, he defeated Chōsokabe Motochika in an Invasion of Shikoku and pacified Shikoku. In 1586, he became Kampaku (Imperial Regent) and Daijō-daijin (Chancellor of the Realm) for the first time in history, although he was not a native-born aristocrat. In 1586, he also succeeded in getting Ieyasu to swear allegiance to him. In 1587, he defeated the Shimazu clan in a Kyūshū campaign and pacified Kyūshū. In 1590, he defeated the Later Hōjō clan in the siege of Odawara and pacified the Kantō region. In the same year, he forced the clans of the Tōhoku region to swear allegiance to him and finally achieved the unification of Japan.

==== Tōhoku region (Date Masamune) ====
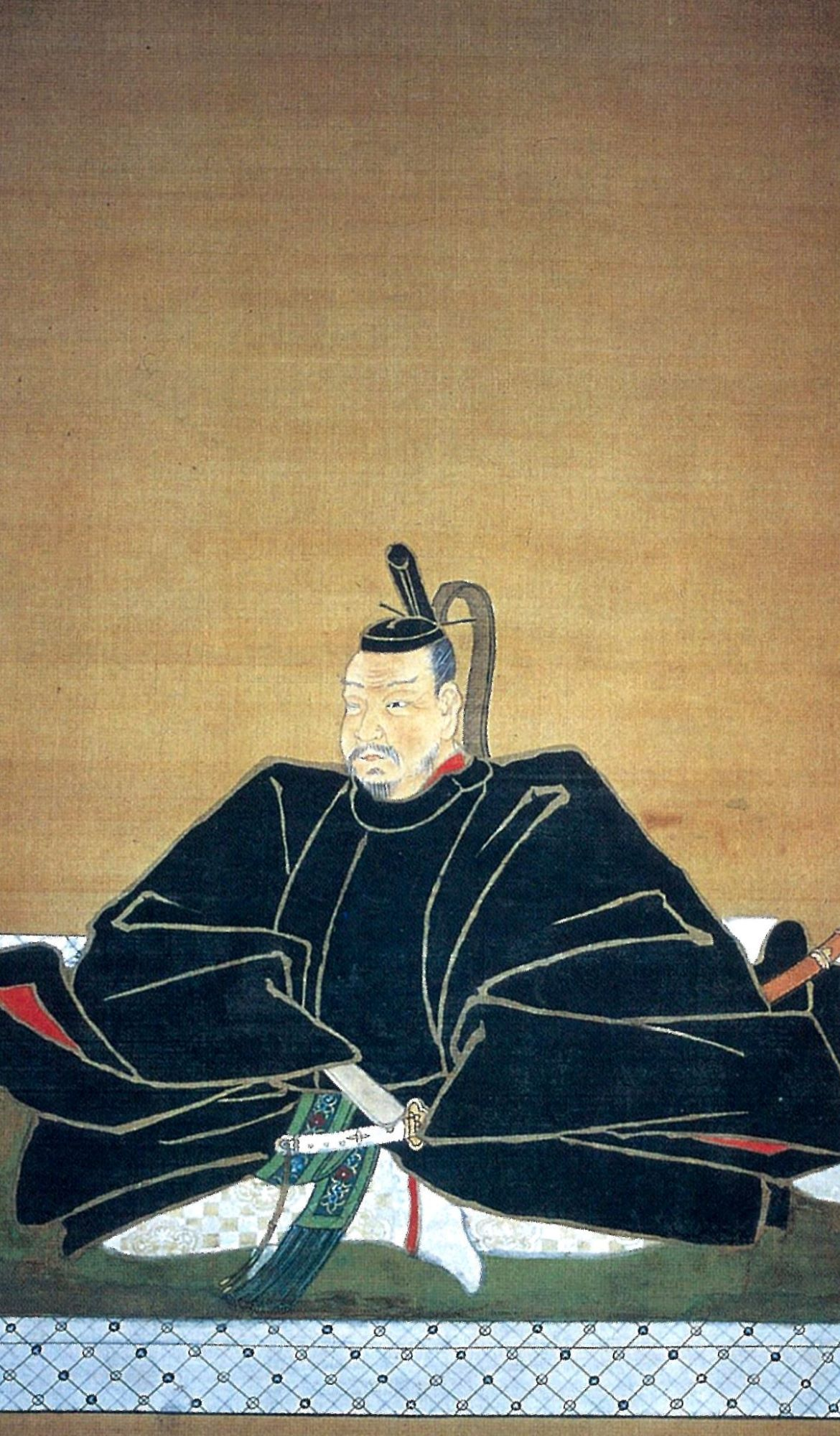
Date Masamune

Date Masamune was a one-eyed warlord, a famous sengoku daimyo who is often said to have had the potential to unite the country if only he had been born 20 years earlier. He became the head of the Date clan in 1584, two years after the death of Oda Nobunaga, destroyed the Nihonmatsu clan and other clans, and then in 1589, at the Battle of Suriagehara, defeated the Ashina clan to conquer the Aizu province, and continued to expand his territory to conquer most of the Tōhoku region. On the other hand, Toyotomi Hideyoshi, who had only the Kantō and Tōhoku regions left to unify Japan, enacted a law called the Sōbujirei (惣無事令) in 1587, which prohibited sengoku daimyo from waging war against each other, and Masamune's conquest of the Tōhoku region was a serious violation of this law. After destroying the Later Hōjō clan at the siege of Odawara, Hideyoshi wanted to destroy the Date clan and other sengoku daimyo in the Tōhoku region who were reluctant to show their deference. Hideyoshi had his subordinate Maeda Toshiie question Masamune, who had arrived late to give the order to participate in the siege of Odawara, but after hearing Masamune's bold attitude, he decided to meet with him. Masamune showed his reverence by appearing before Hideyoshi in a pure white death robe, ready to be executed. Hideyoshi placed his staff on Masamune's neck and said, "If you had come a little later, you would have been beheaded," and Masamune pledged his reverence to Hideyoshi. He did not lose his life, only some of his territory was confiscated. He was later interrogated by Hideyoshi on suspicion of inciting a peasant uprising and participating in the rebellion of Toyotomi Hidetsugu, but he defended himself with his usual courage and dignity and was not punished.

He was on the side of Tokugawa Ieyasu at the Battle of Sekigahara, and as the first lord of the Sendai Domain during the Edo period, he developed Sendai and laid the foundations of the city as the center of the present-day Tōhoku region. In 1613, he sent Hasekura Tsunenaga as an ambassador to Europe, where he was granted an audience with the Pope Paul V.

=== Events ===
Time	Event
1454	Beginning of Kyōtoku incident
1467	Beginning of Ōnin War
1477	End of Ōnin War. The effective independence of the Iga ikki is noted
1482	End of Kyōtoku incident
1485	The Yamashiro uprising results in the formation of the Yamashiro ikki
1487	Battle of Magari: Rokkaku Takayori, assisted by ninjas from the Iga and Kōka ikkis, defeats Ashikaga Yoshihisa
1488	The Kaga Rebellion establishes the Kaga ikki
1493	Hosokawa Masamoto succeeds in the Coup of Meio (Meio incident)
1493	Hōjō Sōun seizes Izu Province
1493	The Ashikaga shogunate destroys the Yamashiro ikki
1507	Beginning of the Ryo Hosokawa War (the succession dispute in the Hosokawa family)
1520	Hosokawa Takakuni defeats Hosokawa Sumimoto
1523	Ming China suspends all diplomatic and trade relations with Japan due to the conflict
1531	Hosokawa Harumoto defeats Hosokawa Takakuni
1535	Battle of Idano The forces of the Matsudaira defeat the rebel Masatoyo
1543	The Portuguese land on Tanegashima, becoming the first Europeans to arrive in Japan, and introduce the arquebus into Japanese warfare
1546	Siege of Kawagoe Castle: Hojo Ujiyasu defeats the Uesugi clan and becomes ruler of the Kanto Region
1549	Miyoshi Nagayoshi betrays Hosokawa Harumoto
1549	Japan officially ends its recognition of China's regional hegemony and cancels any further tribute missions
1551	Tainei-ji incident: Sue Harukata betrays Ōuchi Yoshitaka, taking control of western Honshu
1554	The tripartite pact among Takeda, Hōjō and Imagawa is signed
1555	Battle of Itsukushima: Mōri Motonari defeats Sue Harukata and goes on to supplant the Ōuchi as the foremost daimyo of western Honshu
1560	Battle of Okehazama: The outnumbered Oda Nobunaga defeats and kills Imagawa Yoshimoto in a surprise attack
1561	Fourth Battle of Kawanakajima: The legendary battle between Takeda Shingen and Uesugi Kenshin
1561	Portuguese vessels bombard Moji at the request of Otomo Sorin, who fails to take it in a siege.
1562	Omura Sumitada converted to Christianity, becoming the first Japanese lord to do so.
1565	Portuguese and Japanese vessels belonging to the Matsura clan clash at the Battle of Fukuda Bay.
1568	Oda Nobunaga marches toward Kyoto forcing Matsunaga Hisahide to relinquish control of the city
1570	Battle of Anegawa and the beginning of the Ishiyama Hongan-ji War
1571	Nagasaki is established as a trade port for Portuguese merchants, with authorization of daimyo Ōmura Sumitada
1573	The end of the Ashikaga shogunate
1574	The Rokkaku clan and Kōka ikki surrender to Oda Nobunaga
1575	Battle of Nagashino: Oda Nobunaga and Tokugawa Ieyasu decisively defeat the Takeda clan cavalry with innovative arquebus tactics
1577	Battle of Tedorigawa: The epic battle between Uesugi Kenshin against Oda Nobunaga
1580	End of the Ishiyama Hongan-ji War. Oda Nobunaga unifies central Japan under his rule
1581	The Tenshō Iga War ends with the destruction of the Iga ikki.
1582	Akechi Mitsuhide assassinates Oda Nobunaga in the Honnō-ji Incident; Hashiba Hideyoshi defeats Akechi at the Battle of Yamazaki; Tokugawa Ieyasu gained much of Kai Province and Shinano Province in the Tenshō-Jingo war
1583	Chosokabe Motochika extends his power to all of Shikoku island
1584	Shimazu Yoshihisa succeeds in controlling the entire Kyushu region
1585	Invasion of Shikoku (1585):Hashiba Hideyoshi conquest of Shikoku
1585	Hashiba Hideyoshi is granted the title of Kampaku, establishing his predominant authority; he is granted the surname Toyotomi a year after.
1587	Kyūshū campaign: Toyotomi Hideyoshi defeats the Shimazu clan
1587	Toyotomi Hideyoshi announces the first anti-Christian sentiment
1590	Siege of Odawara: Toyotomi Hideyoshi defeats the Hōjō clan
1590	Toyotomi Hideyoshi achieves the unification of the entire country under the loyalty of the clans of Mutsu Province.
1591	Kunohe rebellion: Toyotomi Hideyoshi and Tokugawa Ieyasu defeat the forces of Kunohe Masazane, unifying Japan under the rule of Toyotomi Hideyoshi
1592–98	Japanese invasions of Korea
1598	Toyotomi Hideyoshi dies
1600	Battle of Sekigahara: The Eastern Army under Tokugawa Ieyasu defeats the Western Army of Toyotomi loyalists
1603	Rokugō Rebellion: Satake clan under Satake Yoshinobu takes full control of Kubota Domain
1603	Tokugawa Ieyasu unifies all of Japan under his rule and establishes the Tokugawa shogunate
1609	Invasion of Ryukyu: The Ryukyu Kingdom becomes a vassal state under the Satsuma Domain of Japan
1614	Catholicism is officially banned and all missionaries are ordered to leave the country for two centuries
1615	Siege of Osaka: The last of the Toyotomi opposition to the Tokugawa shogunate is stamped out

== Gekokujō ==
Japan in 1570

The upheaval resulted in the further weakening of central authority, and throughout Japan, regional lords, called daimyōs, rose to fill the vacuum. In the course of this power shift, well-established clans such as the Takeda and the Imagawa, who had ruled under the authority of both the Kamakura and Muromachi bakufu, were able to expand their spheres of influence. There were many, however, whose positions eroded and were eventually usurped by more capable underlings. This phenomenon of social meritocracy, in which capable subordinates rejected the status quo and forcefully overthrew an emancipated aristocracy, became known as gekokujō, which means "low conquers high".

One of the earliest instances of this was Hōjō Sōun, who rose from relatively humble origins and eventually seized power in Izu Province in 1493. Building on the accomplishments of Sōun, the Hōjō clan remained a major power in the Kantō region until its subjugation by Toyotomi Hideyoshi late in the Sengoku period. Other notable examples include the supplanting of the Hosokawa clan by the Miyoshi, the Toki by the Saitō, and the Shiba clan by the Oda clan, which was in turn replaced by its underling, Toyotomi Hideyoshi, a son of a peasant with no family name.

Well-organized religious groups also gained political power at this time by uniting farmers in resistance and rebellion against the rule of the daimyōs. The monks of the Buddhist True Pure Land sect formed numerous Ikkō-ikki, the most successful of which, in Kaga Province, remained independent for nearly 100 years.

== See also ==
- Crisis of the Third Century – a similar period in Roman history
- Horses in East Asian warfare
- Kabukimono
- List of Japanese battles
- Warring States period – a similar period in Chinese history

== Sources ==
- "Sengoku Jidai". Hōfu-shi Rekishi Yōgo-shū (in Japanese). Hōfu Web Rekishi-kan.
- Hane, Mikiso (1992). Modern Japan: a historical survey (2nd ed.). Boulder, Colo.: Westview Press. ISBN 978-0-8133-1368-9.
- Chaplin, Danny (2018). Sengoku Jidai. Nobunaga, Hideyoshi, and Ieyasu: Three Unifiers of Japan. CreateSpace Independent Publishing Platform. ISBN 978-1-9834-5020-4.
- Hall, John Whitney (May 1961). "Foundations of the Modern Japanese Daimyo". The Journal of Asian Studies. 20 (3). Association for Asian Studies: 317–329. doi:10.2307/2050818. ISSN 0021-9118. JSTOR 2050818. S2CID 56154455.
- Jansen, Marius B. (2002). The making of modern Japan (PDF). Cambridge, Mass.: Harvard University Press. ISBN 978-0-674-00991-2. OCLC 44090600.
- Lorimer, Michael (2008). Sengokujidai: autonomy, division and unity in later medieval Japan. London: Olympia. ISBN 978-1-905513-45-1.
- "Sengoku Jidai". Mypaedia (in Japanese). Hitachi. 1996.

Preceded by Nanboku-chō period (1334–1392) (of Muromachi Period)	History of Japan; Sengoku period 1467–1573 (of Muromachi Period)	Succeeded by Azuchi–Momoyama period 1573–1603
