= Gekokujō =

Japanese word for a type of coup

Gekokujō (下克上; also 下剋上) is a Japanese word which refers to someone of a lower position overthrowing or overruling someone of a higher position using military or political might, seizing power. It is variously translated as "the lower rules the higher" or "the low overcomes the high".

== History ==
The term originated from Sui dynasty China. In Japan, it came into use during the 12th–13th century Kamakura period.

Instances of gekokujō date back to the 15th–16th century Sengoku period. Through the chaotic political climate of the era, Oda Nobunaga and Toyotomi Hideyoshi were able to create fervour and acquire political and military power. In 1588, Hideyoshi ordered the sword hunt, a nationwide confiscation of weapons, to try to prevent further insurrection. After the shogunate was established, social mobility and the freedom of soldiers and farmers was restricted to try to prevent further gekokujō. The Tokugawa shogunate adopted a Confucian system of social stratification, which put all members of society into distinct groups, making it difficult for anyone to leave their given social class.

== Twentieth-century military usage ==
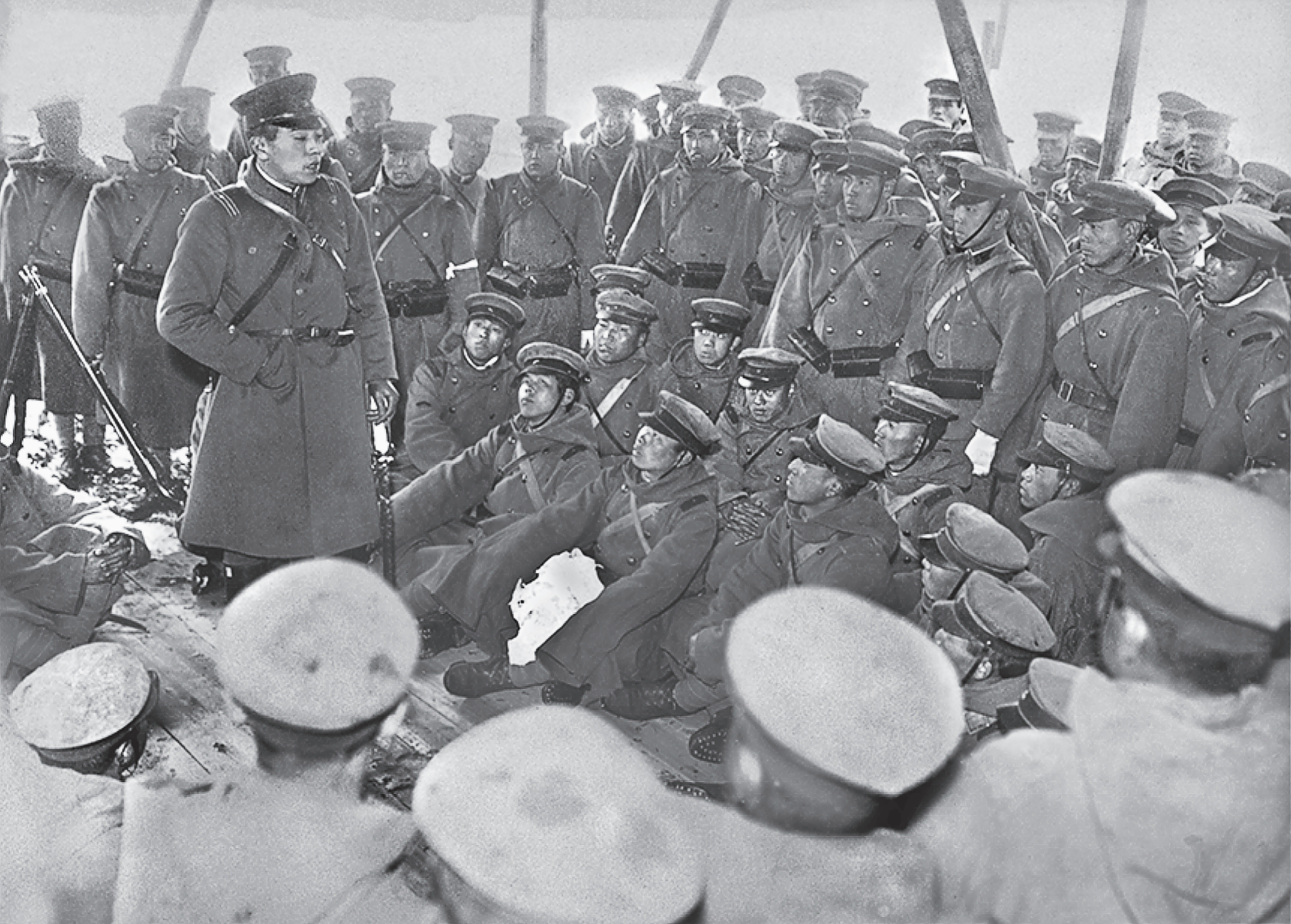
Japanese troops during the February 26 Incident

The term was later used in a distinct, metaphorical sense to describe insubordination by junior officers and other subordinates within the Imperial Japanese military. During the early Showa period (20th century), repeated acts of gekokujō in this sense occurred. The Kōdōha ("Imperial Way") faction were responsible for attempting to assassinate many public figures in the 1920s and 1930s, including the visiting Charlie Chaplin, but were given light prison sentences because they received public support. Inspired by the Kōdōha, the Kwantung Army orchestrated the Mukden Incident in 1931, leading to the Japanese invasion of Manchuria. British correspondent Hugh Byas described the phenomenon as "government by assassination". Masanobu Tsuji (辻 政信) was a well known supporter of extreme gekokujō during World War II.

== See also ==
- Saigō Takamori
- Underdog
- Coup d'état
