= Ashikaga Masatomo =

Son of Ashikaga Yoshinori

- 足利政知

Horigoe Kubo
- In office December 19, 1457 – 1485
- Preceded by: Position created
- Succeeded by: Ashikaga Chachamaru

Sahyoe no Kami
- In office September 9, 1475 – 1485

Personal details
- Born: 1435
- Died: 1491 (aged 55–56)

Ashikaga Masatomo (Japanese: 足利政知; 1435–1491) was a Japanese warrior of the Muromachi period and member of the Ashikaga family. He was the first Horigoe Kubo (Governor-general based in Horigoe, Izu Province, sometimes referred to as Horikoshi or Horiguchi Kubo), and half-brother of Ashikaga Yoshimasa and Ashikaga Yoshimi.

== Life ==
Ashikaga Masatomo was born in 1435, the son of 6th Ashikaga shogun Yoshinori. He became a Rinzai monk at Tenryu-ji temple (the Ashikaga family temple) in Kyoto in his childhood, but by 1457, at the age of 22, was appointed Kanto kubo of Kamakura-fu by Yoshimasa and thus forced to return to secular life.

However, he was not allowed access to Kamakura by the unrecognized Kanto administrator. Weakness of shogunal authority meant that Masatomo would not be able to enter Kamakura, and he therefore ended up living in Horigoe, Izu Province, where he was recognized as the first Horigoe Kubo. The reason for the relocation to Izu was to challenge the authority of a shogunal enemy, Ashikaga Shigeuji.

As Horigoe Kubo, he notified Yoshimasa of the "rebellion" of Uesugi Mochitomo, which caused him to lose favor with the Uesugi, who effectively controlled the Kanto region; he spent much of his time in office fighting against the Koga kubo.

== Death ==
Masatomo disinherited his son Chachamaru, who would go on to murder his father during a succession dispute in 1491. He was succeeded in office as Horigoe kubo by this same son, and forced Masatomo's other son Yoshizumi into the protection of the Imagawa.
