= 1528 =

1528 in various calendars
- Gregorian calendar: 1528; MDXXVIII
- Ab urbe condita: 2281
- Armenian calendar: 977; ԹՎ ՋՀԷ
- Assyrian calendar: 6278
- Balinese saka calendar: 1449–1450
- Bengali calendar: 934–935
- Berber calendar: 2478
- English Regnal year: 19 Hen. 8 – 20 Hen. 8
- Buddhist calendar: 2072
- Burmese calendar: 890
- Byzantine calendar: 7036–7037
- Chinese calendar: 丁亥年 (Fire Pig); 4225 or 4018 — to — 戊子年 (Earth Rat); 4226 or 4019
- Coptic calendar: 1244–1245
- Discordian calendar: 2694
- Ethiopian calendar: 1520–1521
- Hebrew calendar: 5288–5289
- Hindu calendars
- Vikram Samvat: 1584–1585
- Shaka Samvat: 1449–1450
- Kali Yuga: 4628–4629
- Holocene calendar: 11528
- Igbo calendar: 528–529
- Iranian calendar: 906–907
- Islamic calendar: 934–935
- Japanese calendar: Daiei 8 / Kyōroku 1 (享禄元年)
- Javanese calendar: 1446–1447
- Julian calendar: 1528; MDXXVIII
- Korean calendar: 3861
- Minguo calendar: 384 before ROC 民前384年
- Nanakshahi calendar: 60
- Thai solar calendar: 2070–2071
- Tibetan calendar: མེ་མོ་ཕག་ལོ་ (female Fire-Boar); 1654 or 1273 or 501 — to — ས་ཕོ་བྱི་བ་ལོ་ (male Earth-Rat); 1655 or 1274 or 502

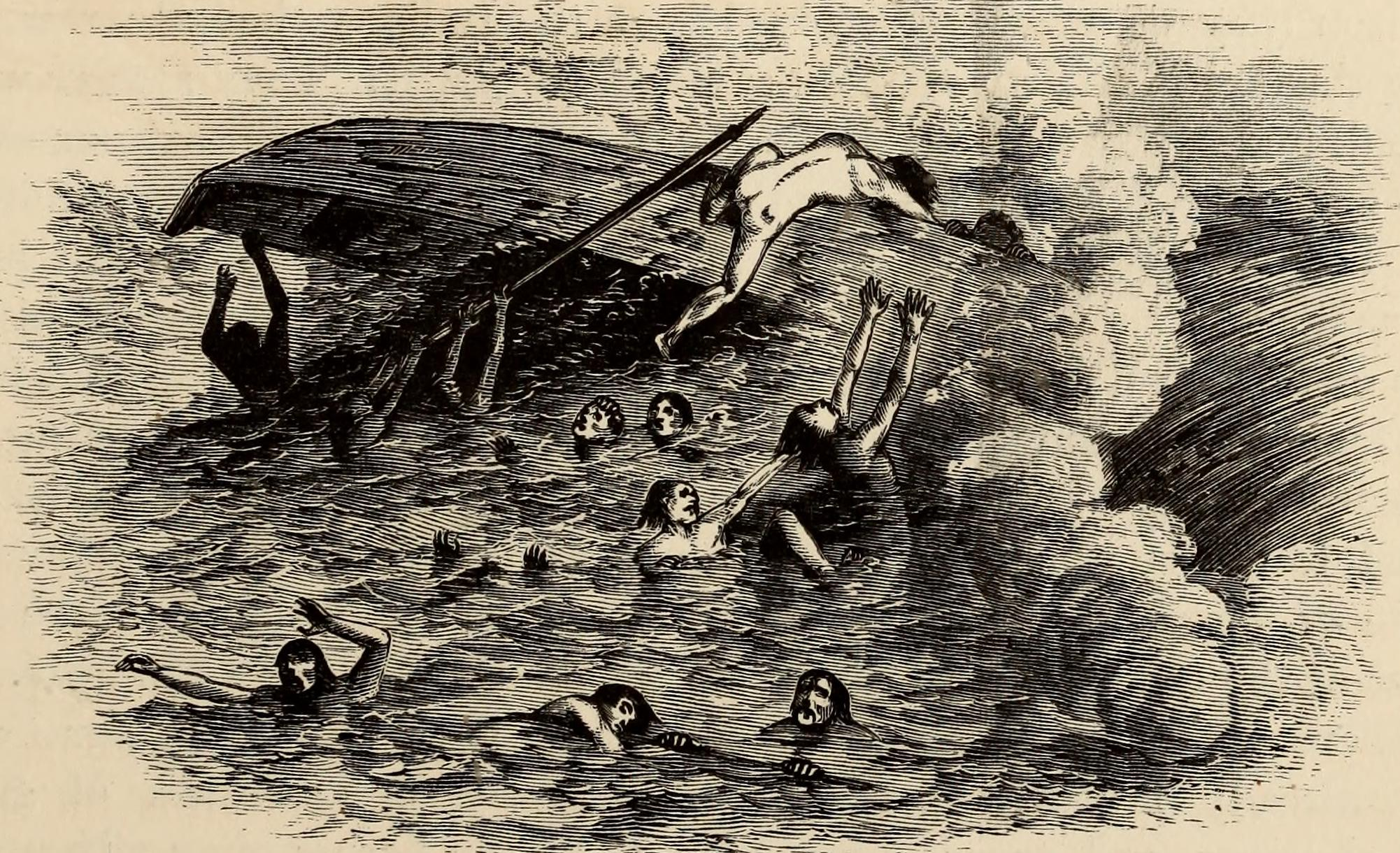
November 6: Spanish explorers are wrecked on Galveston Island, becoming the first Europeans in what is now Texas.

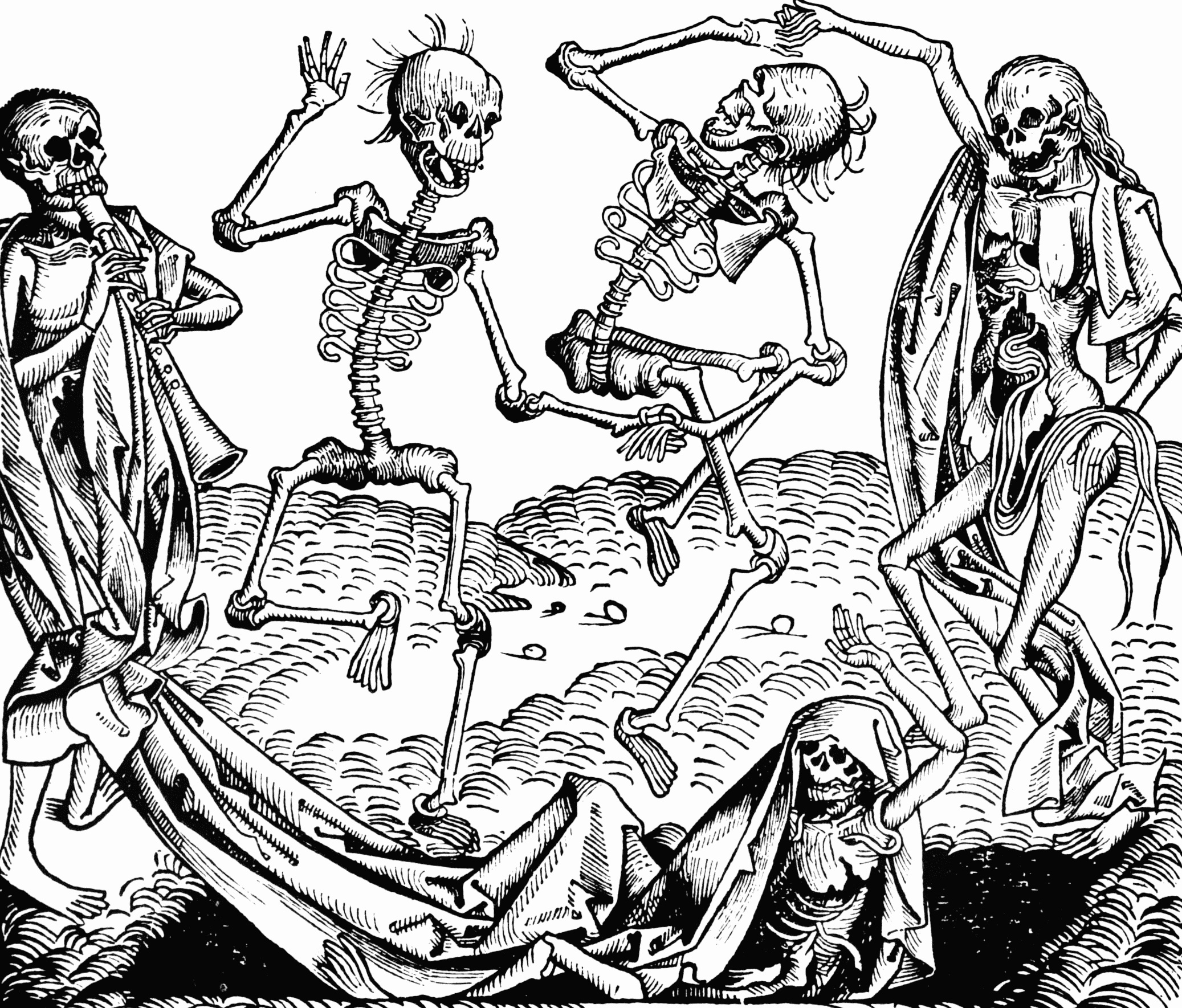
June 5: The sweating sickness plague is first noticed in England.

Year 1528 (MDXXVIII) was a leap year starting on Wednesday of the Julian calendar, there is also a Leap year starting on Sunday of the Gregorian calendar.

== Events ==
=== January–March ===
- January 12 – Gustav I of Sweden is crowned king of Sweden, having already reigned since his election in June 1523.
- January 26 – The Canton of Bern becomes the second in Switzerland to officially adopt Protestantism after 21-day debate, the Bern Disputation
- February 29 – John Zápolya, ruler of the remaining eastern portion of Hungary after its the acquisition of the western section by the Habsburg Austrians, joins in an alliance with the Sultan Suleiman the Magnificent of the Ottoman Turks, receiving protection and autonomy in return for allowing Turkish occupation of his Eastern Hungarian Kingdom.
- February
  - Peasant uprising in Dalarna, Sweden: The rebel campaign fails, and the rebel leader, later known as Daljunkern, flees to Rostock.
  - Diego García de Moguer explores the Sierra de la Plata along the Río de la Plata, and begins to travel up the Paraná River.
- March 20 – The Battle of Szina is fought in the Kingdom of Hungary between the two rival kings, John Zápolya of Eastern Hungary and Archduke Ferdinand of Austria, the Habsburg King of Western Hungary. Zapolya and his 15,000-man army are defeated by mercenaries hired by the Habsburgs.
- March 22 – Siege of the southern Italian city of Melfi is started by the French Army, under the command of Marshal Odet of Foix, Viscount of Lautrec. After killing the defenders and pulling down the city walls, the French troops plunder what remains and massacre more than 3,000 men, women and children.

=== April–June ===
- April 28 – Battle of Capo d'Orso: The French fleet, under mercenary captain Filippino Doria, crushes the Spanish squadron trying to run the blockade of Naples.
- May 9 – King James V of Scotland, 16, held captive for more than two years under the guardianship of the Earl of Angus, is able to escape from Edinburgh to Stirling after several failed rescue attempts.
- June 5 – The fourth major outbreak of the sweating sickness is noted for the first time, with a reference in a letter to Bishop Tunstall of London from someone who has fled his home because a servant at his house has become infected with the disease, with sweating soon followed by death.
- June 17 – The Italian city of Rimini and its surrounding area, ruled by the House of Malatesta, is conquered by troops of the Papal States and subsequently annexed.

=== July–September ===
- July 3 – Pope Clement VII issues the bull Religionis zelus, recognizing the Order of Friars Minor Capuchin (Ordo Fratrum Minorum Capuccinorum), commonly known as the Capuchin monks, as a reformist branch of the Franciscans order of Roman Catholicism.
- July 8 – After surviving a mutiny of his crew and the death of 18 of his men in an ambush in what is now Argentina, Italian Venetian explorer Sebastian Cabot dispatches his flagship, Trinidad, back to Spain with reports and evidence against the mutineers, and a request for further military aid.
- August 4 – The "Peace of St. Ambrose" is signed in Milan at the Basilica of Sant'Ambrogio, bringing an end to the civil strife between the Milanese nobility and the local merchants.
- August 26 – Askia Muhammad I, ruler of the Songhai Empire in West Africa since 1493, is forced to abdicate by his son, Askia Musa, who declares himself to be the new Songhai Emperor.
- August 29 – The Siege of Naples, at the time a part of the Holy Roman Empire, fails four months after it was launched by troops from France, led by Odet de Foix, who had died of illness on August 15. The Imperial, Spanish and Genoese armies pursue their French attackers, who were attempting to retreat to the nearby city of Aversa, and eliminate the survivors.
- September 3 – The Kyōroku era begins in Japan, with the last day of the Daiei era ending on Daiei 8, 20th day of the 8th month.
- September 12 – Italian Admiral Andrea Doria defeats his former allies, the French, and establishes the independence of Genoa.
- September 19 – War of the League of Cognac: The Italian city of Pavia is besieged for the fifth and last time during the decade, after having been attacked in 1522, 1524, 1527, and in May of 1528. Troops from a coalition of the Venetian Republic, the Kingdom of France and the Duchy of Milan break through the city walls after six days of bombardment, kill 700 of the defenders, and recover the city for Francesco II Sforza, Duke of Milan.

=== October–December ===
- October 3 – Álvaro de Saavedra Cerón arrives in the Maluku Islands.
- October 13 – Cardinal Thomas Wolsey founds a college in his birthplace of Ipswich, England, which becomes the modern-day Ipswich School (incorporating institutions in the town dating back to 1299).
- October 20 – The Treaty of Gorinchem is signed between Charles V, Holy Roman Emperor, and Charles, Duke of Guelders.
- November 6 – Spanish conquistador Álvar Núñez Cabeza de Vaca and his companions become the first known Europeans to set foot on the shores of what is present-day Texas, when they and 80 survivors are wrecked on Galveston Island following a storm. Only 15 live beyond winter, and they are eventually enslaved by various Indian tribes. Eventually, only four of the 81 Spanish survivors— Cabeza de Vaca, Andrés Dorantes de Carranza, Alonso del Castillo Maldonado, and an African slave of Dorantes, Estevanico— are able to escape and return home.
- December 9 – A new, three-member executive junta is appointed by the King of Spain to govern New Spain and the West Indies, with Nuño Beltrán de Guzmán, Juan Ortiz de Matienzo, and Diego Delgadillo forming the first Audiencia Real. Beltran de Guzmán, Ortiz and Delgadillo succeed the two viceroys, Alonso de Estrada and Luis de la Torre. Beltran de Guzmán is designated as the President of the Audiencia.

=== Date unknown ===
- With the death of Skender Bey Crnojević, the Sanjak of Montenegro was disintegrated. The Montenegro Vilayet was formed and joined to the Sanjak of Scutari as a unique administrative unit with a certain degree of autonomy.
- Spanish Conquistador Francisco de Montejo attempts an invasion of the Yucatán, but is driven out by the Maya peoples.
- Spain takes direct control of Acapulco.
- Bubonic plague breaks out in England.
- St George's Chapel in Windsor Castle is completed.
- Chateau Fontainebleau in France is begun.
- Michelangelo Buonarroti begins work on the fortifications of Florence.
- Baldassare Castiglione publishes The Book of the Courtier.
- In Henan province, China, during the mid Ming dynasty, a vast drought deprives the region of harvests for the next two years, killing off half the people in some communities, due to starvation and cannibalism.
- Perak Sultanate and Johor Sultanate were established, both states being ruled by the sons of Mahmud Shah of Malacca.

== Births ==
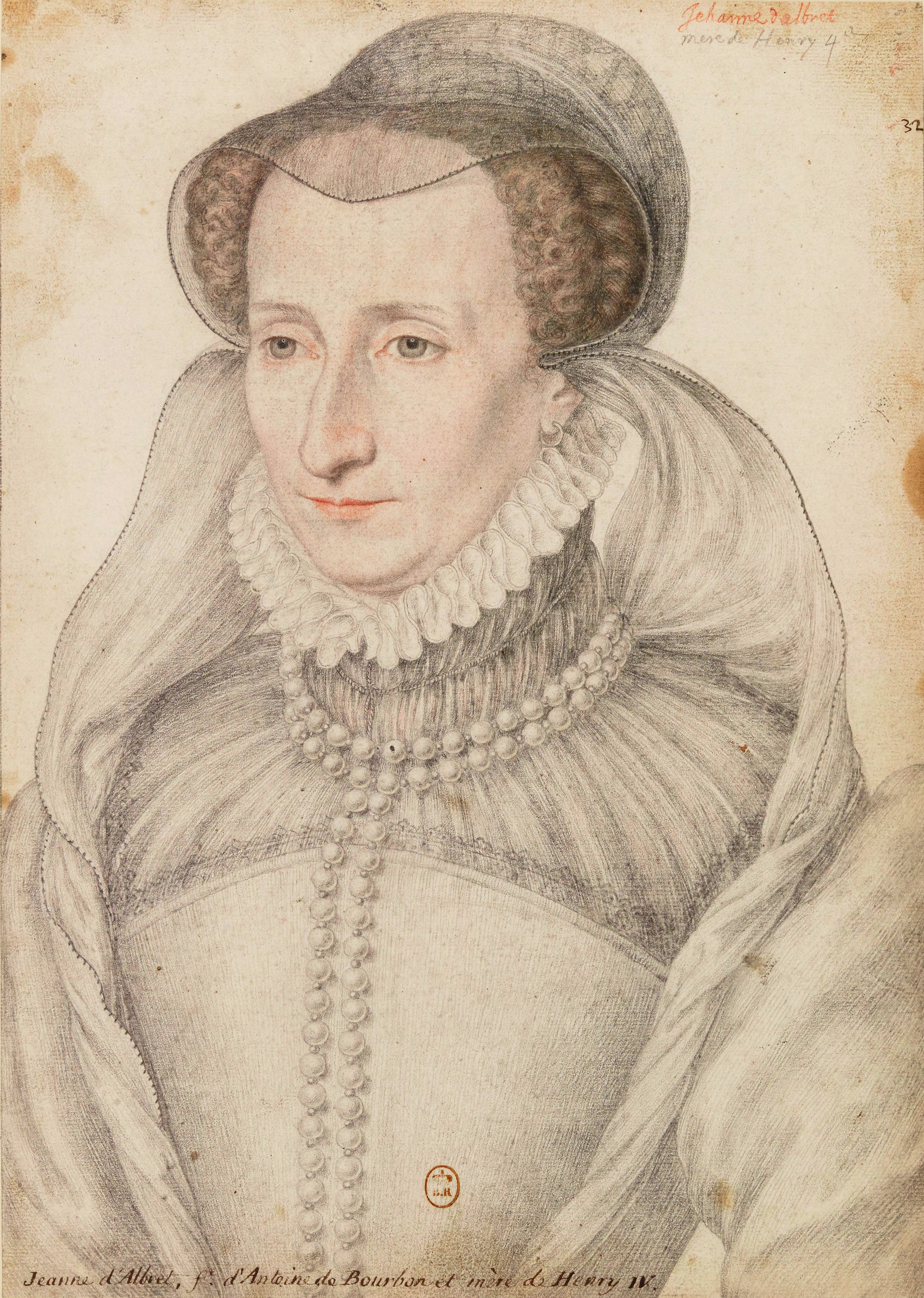
Jeanne III of Navarre

- February 29
  - Domingo Báñez, Spanish theologian (d. 1604)
  - Albert V of Bavaria (d. 1579)
- March 10 – Akechi Mitsuhide, Japanese samurai and warlord (d. 1582)
- March 25 – Jakob Andreae, German theologian (d. 1590)
- June 7 – Cyriacus Spangenberg, German theologian and historian (d. 1604)
- June 21 – Maria of Austria, Holy Roman Empress (d. 1603)
- June 29 – Julius, Duke of Brunswick-Lüneburg (d. 1589)
- July 7 – Archduchess Anna of Austria, Duchess of Bavaria (d. 1590)
- July 8 – Emmanuel Philibert, Duke of Savoy (d. 1580)
- July 26 – Diego Andrada de Payva, Portuguese theologian (d. 1575)
- August 10 – Eric II of Brunswick-Lüneburg (d. 1584)
- September 25 – Otto II of Brunswick-Harburg (d. 1603)
- October 4? – Francisco Guerrero, Spanish composer (d. 1599)
- October 10 – Adam Lonicer, German botanist (d. 1586)
- November 2 – Petrus Lotichius Secundus, German Neo-Latin poet (d. 1560)
- November 6 – Gabriel Goodman, Dean of Westminster (d. 1601)
- November 12 – Qi Jiguang, Chinese military general (d. 1588)
- November 14 – Francisco Pérez de Valenzuela, Spanish noble (d. 1599)
- November 16 – Jeanne d'Albret, Queen of Navarre (d. 1572)
- November 29 – Anthony Browne, 1st Viscount Montagu, English politician (d. 1592)
- date unknown
  - Igram van Achelen, Dutch statesman (d. 1604)
  - Adam von Bodenstein, Swiss alchemist and physician (d. 1577)
  - Jean-Jacques Boissard, French antiquary and Latin poet (d. 1602)
  - Andrey Kurbsky, Russian writer (d. 1583)
  - George Talbot, 6th Earl of Shrewsbury, English statesman (d. 1590)
  - Phùng Khắc Khoan, Vietnamese military strategist, politician, diplomat and poet (d. 1613)
  - Sabina, Duchess of Bavaria (d. 1578)
  - Sakuma Nobumori, Japanese retainer and samurai (d. 1582)
  - Tanegashima Tokitaka, Japanese daimyō (d. 1579)
  - Thomas Whythorne, English musician and author (d. 1595)
- probable
  - Ambrose Dudley, 3rd Earl of Warwick, English general (d. 1590)
  - Paul de Foix, French diplomat (d. 1584)
  - Jean de Ligne, stadtholder of the Dutch provinces of Friesland (d. 1568)
  - Costanzo Porta, Italian composer (d. 1601)

== Deaths ==
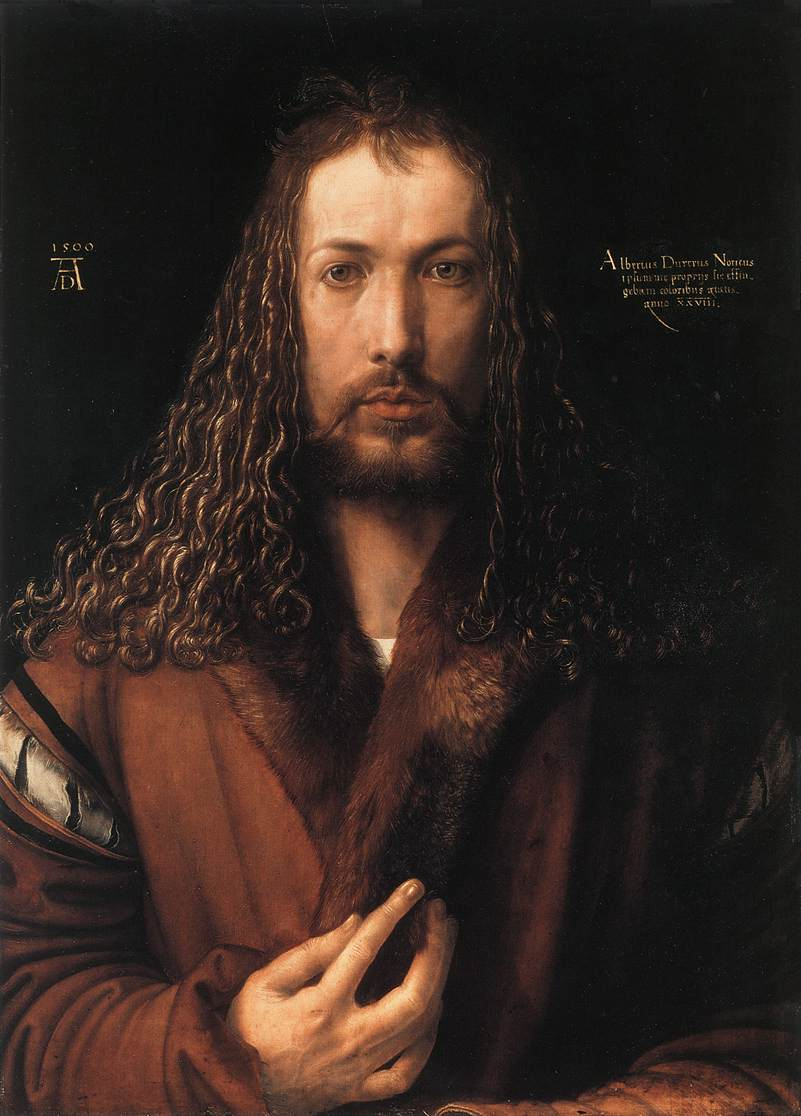
Albrecht Dürer

- January 30 – Maharana Sangram Singh, Rana of Mewar (b. 1484)
- February 29 – Patrick Hamilton, Scottish religious reformer (martyred) (b. 1504)
- March 10 – Balthasar Hübmaier, influential German/Moravian Anabaptist leader (b. 1480)
- April 1 – Francisco de Peñalosa, Spanish composer (b. c. 1470)
- April 6 – Albrecht Dürer, German artist, writer, and mathematician (b. 1471)
- July – Palma il Vecchio, Italian painter (b. 1480)
- August 15 – Odet de Foix, Vicomte de Lautrec, French military leader (b. 1485)
- August 20 – Georg von Frundsberg, German knight and landowner (b. 1473)
- August 23 – Louis, Count of Vaudémont, Italian bishop (b. 1500)
- August 31 – Matthias Grünewald, German artist (b. 1470)
- September – Pánfilo de Narváez, Spanish conqueror and soldier in the Americas (b. 1480)
- October 5 – Richard Foxe, English churchman (b. c. 1448)
- October 18 – Michele Antonio, Marquess of Saluzzo (b. 1495)
- October 21 – Johann of Schwarzenberg, German judge and poet (b. 1463)
- November 17 – Jakob Wimpfeling, Renaissance humanist (b. 1450)
- December 7 – Margaret of Saxony, Duchess of Brunswick-Lüneburg (b. 1469)
- date unknown
  - Giovanni da Verrazzano, Italian explorer (b. 1485)
  - Peter Vischer the Younger, German sculptor (b. 1487)
  - Mahmud Shah of Malacca, Malaccan sultan
  - Daljunkern, Swedish rebel leader who may have been pretender Nils Sture (b. 1512)
  - Barbro Stigsdotter, Swedish noblewoman and heroine (b. 1472)
  - Guru Ravidas, (b. 1377)
