= 1599 =

1599 in various calendars
- Gregorian calendar: 1599; MDXCIX
- Ab urbe condita: 2352
- Armenian calendar: 1048; ԹՎ ՌԽԸ
- Assyrian calendar: 6349
- Balinese saka calendar: 1520–1521
- Bengali calendar: 1005–1006
- Berber calendar: 2549
- English Regnal year: 41 Eliz. 1 – 42 Eliz. 1
- Buddhist calendar: 2143
- Burmese calendar: 961
- Byzantine calendar: 7107–7108
- Chinese calendar: 戊戌年 (Earth Dog); 4296 or 4089 — to — 己亥年 (Earth Pig); 4297 or 4090
- Coptic calendar: 1315–1316
- Discordian calendar: 2765
- Ethiopian calendar: 1591–1592
- Hebrew calendar: 5359–5360
- Hindu calendars
- Vikram Samvat: 1655–1656
- Shaka Samvat: 1520–1521
- Kali Yuga: 4699–4700
- Holocene calendar: 11599
- Igbo calendar: 599–600
- Iranian calendar: 977–978
- Islamic calendar: 1007–1008
- Japanese calendar: Keichō 4 (慶長４年)
- Javanese calendar: 1519–1520
- Julian calendar: Gregorian minus 10 days
- Korean calendar: 3932
- Minguo calendar: 313 before ROC 民前313年
- Nanakshahi calendar: 131
- Thai solar calendar: 2141–2142
- Tibetan calendar: ས་ཕོ་ཁྱི་ལོ་ (male Earth-Dog); 1725 or 1344 or 572 — to — ས་མོ་ཕག་ལོ་ (female Earth-Boar); 1726 or 1345 or 573

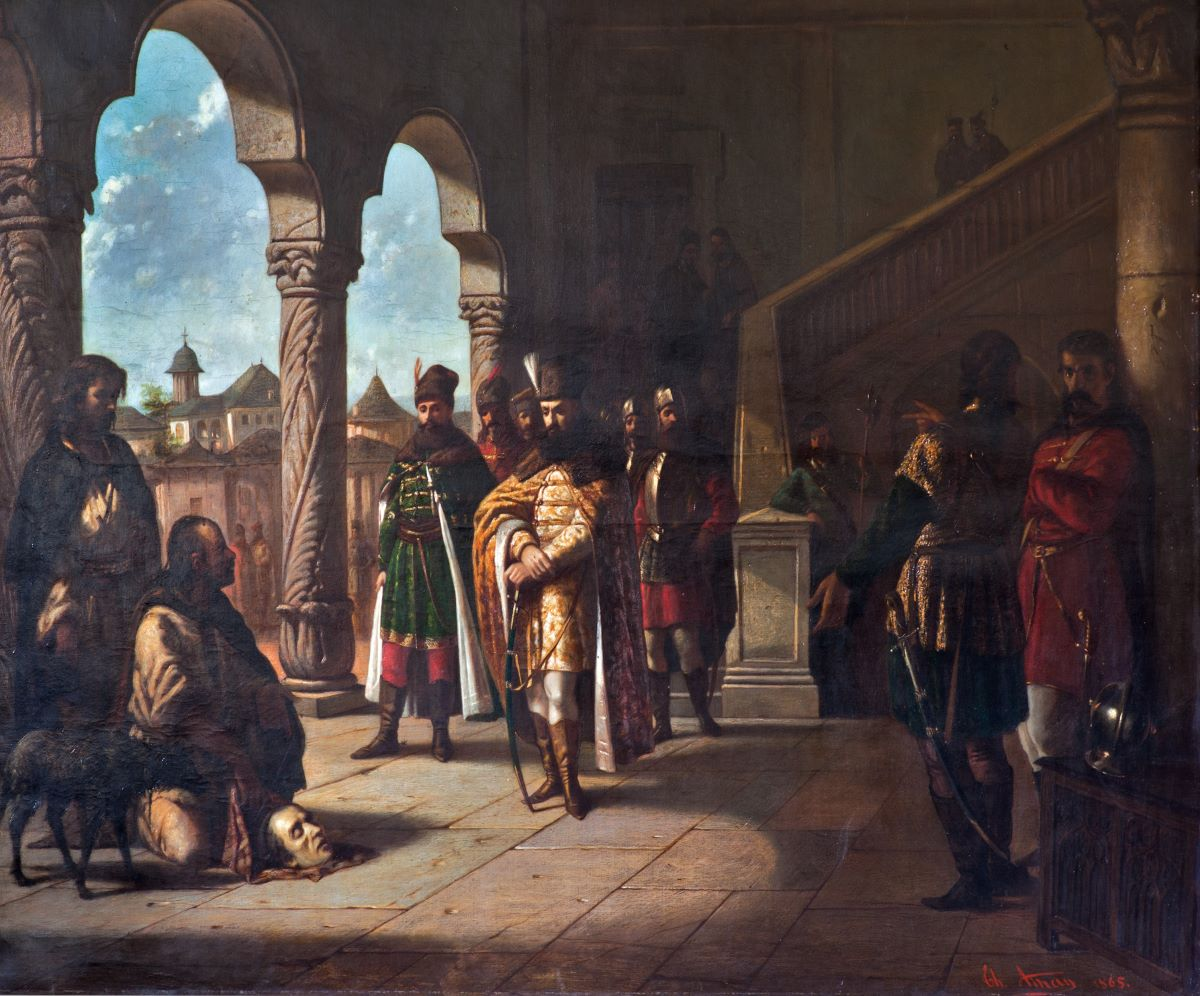
October 18: Battle of Șelimbăr

1599 (MDXCIX) was a common year starting on Friday of the Gregorian calendar and a common year starting on Monday of the Julian calendar, the 1599th year of the Common Era (CE) and Anno Domini (AD) designations, the 599th year of the 2nd millennium, the 99th year of the 16th century, and the 10th and last year of the 1590s decade. As of the start of 1599, the Gregorian calendar was 10 days ahead of the Julian calendar, which remained in localized use until 1923.

== Events ==
=== January–March ===
- January 8 – The Jesuit educational plan, known as the Ratio Studiorum, is issued.
- January 22 – Acoma Massacre: Santa Fe de Nuevo Mexico viceroy Juan de Oñate leads 70 armed Spanish soldiers against the indigenous Keres people at Aak'u (the Acoma Pueblo), near what is now Albuquerque, New Mexico. In three days, 500 Acoma men and 300 women and children are killed by the Spanish.
- February 20 – On Shrove Tuesday, the earliest known performance of William Shakespeare's play As You Like It is given, presented at Richmond Park for Queen Elizabeth.
- February 21
  - At Southwark, near London on the south bank of the River Thames, the land upon which the Globe Theatre will be built is leased by Nicholas Brend to a team of investors led by William Shakespeare, Thomas Pope, actors Cuthbert and Richard Burbage, and three others.
  - Lorenzo Sauli becomes the new Doge of the Republic of Genoa, succeeding Lazzaro Grimaldi Cebà. Sauli will serve until 1601.
- March 12 – Robert Devereux, 2nd Earl of Essex, is appointed Lord Lieutenant of Ireland, by Queen Elizabeth I of England.

=== April–June ===
- April 23 – The Earl of Essex arrives in Dublin at the head of 16,000 troops, the largest army ever seen in Ireland.
- May 15 – Anglo-Spanish War (1585–1604): The Siege of Zaltbommel, located in the Dutch Republic, is begun by Spanish general Francisco López de Mendoza.
- May 16 – The Kalmar Bloodbath takes place in Kalmar, Sweden.
- May 29 – Essex takes Cahir Castle, supposedly the strongest in Ireland, after a short siege.
- June 1 – Bishops' Ban of 1599: The Archbishop of Canterbury, John Whitgift, and the Bishop of London, Richard Bancroft order a ban on a selection of literary works, including Microcynicon: Six Snarling Satires, by Thomas Middleton.
- June 20 – The Synod of Diamper is convened.

=== July–September ===
- July 17 – Second Dutch Expedition to East Indies: A Dutch fleet returns to Amsterdam from what is now Indonesia, carrying 600,000 pounds of pepper and 250,000 pounds of cloves and nutmeg.
- July 22 – The combined Dutch and English armies successfully defend Zaltbommel after a siege of two months.
- July 24 – Swedish King Sigismund III Vasa is dethroned by his uncle Duke Charles, who takes over as regent of the realm until 1604, when he becomes King Charles IX.
- August 15 – First Battle of Curlew Pass: Irish forces defeat the English.
- September 21 – The first reported performance at the Globe Theatre in London (erected over Spring/Summer), a presentation of Shakespeare's Julius Caesar (probably new to that year), is recorded by Swiss traveller Thomas Platter the Younger.
- September 28 – The Earl of Essex arrives back in England, disobeying the Queen's strict orders.

=== October–December ===
- October 18 – Battle of Sellenberk: Michael the Brave, Prince of Wallachia, defeats the army of Andrew Báthory near Șelimbăr, leading to the first recorded unification of the Romanians.
- November 10 – The Åbo Bloodbath takes place in Åbo (Turku), in modern-day Finland, which was part of Sweden at the time.
- November – Persian embassy to Europe (1599–1602): A diplomatic delegation from Safavid Persia, led by Hossein Ali Beg Bayat and his staff after being dispatched by the Shah Abbas the Great, arrives in Moscow as part of a mission to enlist European nations into an alliance against the Ottoman Empire. The Persians are accompanied by English adventurer Anthony Shirley, who had persuaded Shah Abbas to undertake the initiative.
- December 19 – The forces of Minye Thihathu II of Toungoo and his ally Min Razagyi of the Kingdom of Mrauk U end the First Toungoo Empire by capturing Pegu (modern-day Bago, Myanmar).

=== Date unknown ===
- The first Capuchin friar is entombed in the Catacombe dei Cappuccini in Palermo (Sicily).
- The Toyokuni Shrine in Kyoto and Oyama Shrine, dedicated to Maeda Toshiie, were founded.

== Births ==
=== January–March ===
- January 22 – Robert Petre, 3rd Baron Petre, English baron (d. 1638)
- January 31 – Juraj V Zrinski, Ban of Croatia (d. 1626)
- February 12
  - Duke Friedrich of Saxe-Altenburg, third son of Duke Friedrich Wilhelm I of Saxe-Weimar (d. 1625)
  - Thomas Whitmore, English lawyer and politician who sat in the House of Commons (d. 1677)
- February 13 – Pope Alexander VII (d. 1667)
- March 1 – John Mennes, English Royal Navy admiral (d. 1671)
- March 3 – Juan Alfonso Enríquez de Cabrera, Viceroy of Sicily and Viceroy of Naples (d. 1647)
- March 13 – John Berchmans, Belgian Jesuit scholastic and saint (d. 1621)
- March 22 – Anthony van Dyck, Flemish painter (d. 1641)
- March 23 – Thomas Selle, German baroque composer (d. 1663)
- March 28 – Witte de With, famous Dutch naval officer of the 17th century (d. 1658)

=== April–June ===
Oliver Cromwell

- April 9 – Sir Thomas Mauleverer, 1st Baronet (d. 1655)
- April 17 – Patrick Fleming, Irish Franciscan friar and scholar (d. 1631)
- April 25 – Oliver Cromwell, Lord Protector of England, Scotland, and Ireland (d. 1658)
- May 16 – Nicolaes Olycan, Dutch businessman (d. 1639)
- May 30 – Samuel Bochart, French Protestant biblical scholar (d. 1667)
- June 1 – Elizabeth Lucretia, Duchess of Cieszyn, Duchess suo jure of Cieszyn (d. 1653)
- June 6 – Diego Velázquez, Spanish painter (d. 1660)
- June 24 – Konoe Nobuhiro, Japanese court noble (d. 1649)

=== July–September ===
- July 23 – Stephanius, Danish historian (d. 1650)
- July 27 – Albert IV, Duke of Saxe-Eisenach (1640–1644) (d. 1644)
- August 11 – Christian II, Prince of Anhalt-Bernburg (1630–1656) (d. 1656)
- August 13 – Johannes Buxtorf II, Swiss theologian (d. 1664)
- August 14 – Méric Casaubon, English classicist (d. 1671)
- August 16 – Diego López Pacheco, 7th Duke of Escalona, Spanish noble (d. 1653)
- August 22 – Agatha Marie of Hanau, German noblewoman (d. 1636)
- September 7 – Jacob Westerbaen, Dutch poet (d. 1670)
- September 20 – Christian, Duke of Brunswick-Lüneburg-Wolfenbüttel, German Protestant military leader (d. 1626)
- September 24 – Adam Olearius, German scholar (d. 1671)
- September 25 – Francesco Borromini, Swiss sculptor and architect (d. 1667)
- September 30 – Frances Seymour, Duchess of Somerset (d. 1674)

=== October–December ===
- October 10
  - Samuel Clarke, English writer and priest (d. 1683)
  - Étienne Moulinié, French Baroque composer (d. 1676)
- October 11 – Abraham de Fabert, Marshal of France (d. 1662)
- October 15 – Cornelis de Graeff, Dutch mayor (d. 1664)
- October 28 – Marie of the Incarnation, French foundress of the Ursuline Monastery in Quebec (d. 1672)
- October 31 – Denzil Holles, 1st Baron Holles, English statesman and writer (d. 1680)
- November 5 – Carlo Emanuele Madruzzo, Italian prince-bishop (d. 1658)
- November 11
  - Maria Eleonora of Brandenburg, German princess and queen consort of Sweden (d. 1655)
  - Ottavio Piccolomini, Austrian-Italian field marshal (d. 1656)
- November 13 – Otto Christoph von Sparr, German general (d. 1668)
- November 15 – Werner Rolfinck, German physician, chemist, botanist and philosopher (d. 1673)
- November 29 – Peter Heylin, English ecclesiastic and author of many polemical works (d. 1662)
- November 30 – Andrea Sacchi, Italian painter of High Baroque Classicism (d. 1661)
- December 2
  - Thomas Bruce, 1st Earl of Elgin, Scottish nobleman (d. 1663)
  - Alexander Daniell, sole proprietor of the Manor of Alverton, Cornwall (d. 1668)
- December 11 – Pieter Codde, Dutch painter (d. 1678)
- December 14 – Charles Berkeley, 2nd Viscount Fitzhardinge, English politician (d. 1668)
- December 16 – Jacques Vallée, Sieur Des Barreaux, French poet (d. 1673)
- December 20 – Niels Trolle, Governor General of Norway (d. 1667)
- December 29 – Gabriel Bucelin, German historian (d. 1681)

=== Date unknown ===
- John Alden, English settler of Plymouth Colony (d. 1687)
- Stefan Czarniecki, Polish military commander (d. 1665)
- Lucy Hay, Countess of Carlisle, English courtier (d. 1660)
- Charlotte Stanley, Countess of Derby defender of Latham House (d. 1664)
- Jirgalang, Qing Dynasty prince (d. 1655)

== Deaths ==
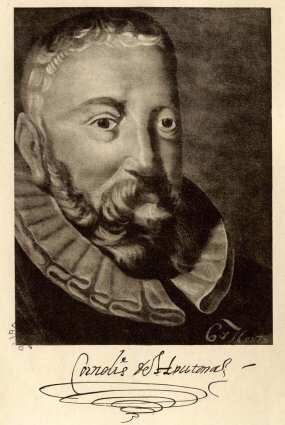
Cornelis de Houtman

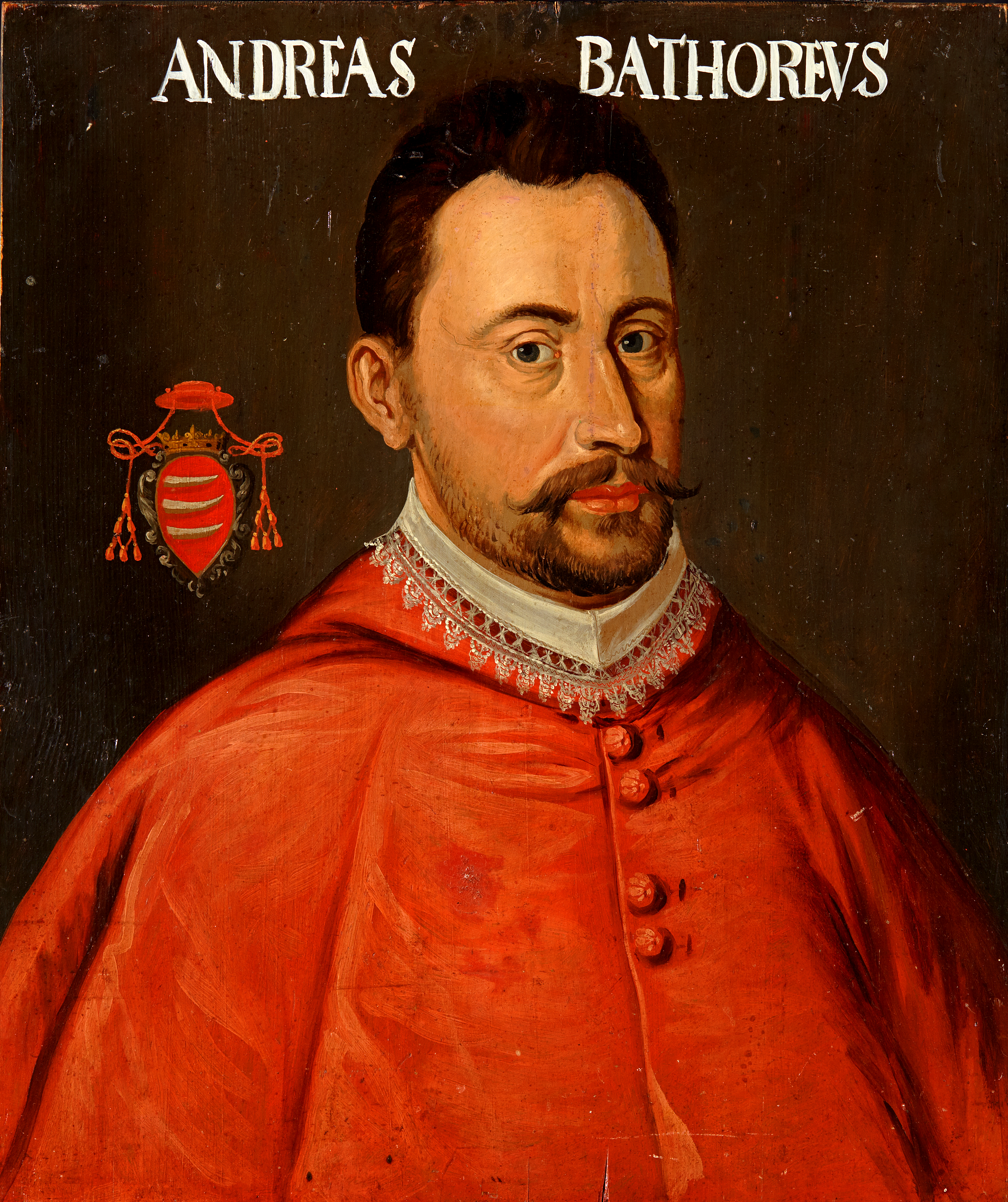
Andrew Báthory

- January 13 – Edmund Spenser, English poet (b. 1552)
- January 22 – Cristofano Malvezzi, Italian composer (b. 1547)
- February 8 – Robert Rollock, Scottish Presbyterian, first principal of the university of Edinburgh (b. 1555)
- March 19 – Stanisław Radziwiłł, Grand Marshal of Lithuania (b. 1559)
- April 1 – Matsura Takanobu, Japanese samurai (b, 1529)
- April 10 – Gabrielle d'Estrées, mistress of King Henry IV of France (b. 1573)
- April 14 – Henry Wallop, English statesman (b. c. 1540)
- April 22 – Lorenz Scholz von Rosenau, German botanist (b. 1552)
- April 27 – Maeda Toshiie, Japanese samurai and warlord (b. 1538)
- May 12 – Sultan Murad Mirza, Mughal prince (b. 1570)
- May 28 – Maria of Nassau, Dutch Countess (b. 1539)
- June 2 – Philipp V, Count of Hanau-Lichtenberg (b. 1541)
- June 14 – Kōriki Masanaga, Japanese military commander (b. 1558)
- June 29 – Archduchess Catherine Renata of Austria, Austrian archduchess (b. 1576)
- July – Kwon Yul, Korean military commander (b. 1537)
- July 11 – Chōsokabe Motochika, Japanese Sengoku Period daimyō
- August 22 – Luca Marenzio, Italian composer (b. 1553)
- September 1 – Cornelis de Houtman, Dutch explorer (b.1565)
- September 11 – Beatrice Cenci, Italian noblewoman (executed for patricide) (b. 1577)
- August 8 – Song Ikp'il, Korean scholar (b. 1534)
- October 18 – Daniel Adam z Veleslavína, Czech lexicographer (b. 1546)
- November 3 – Andrew Báthory, deposed Prince of Transylvania (decapitated) (b. c. 1563)
- November 7 – Gasparo Tagliacozzi, Italian surgeon (b. 1545)
- November 8 – Francisco Guerrero, Spanish composer (b. 1528)
- November 22 – Nanbu Nobunao, Japanese daimyō (b. 1546)
- December 13 – Enrico Caetani, Italian Catholic cardinal (b. 1550)
- December 14 – Joan Boyle, English noble, first spouse of Richard Boyle, 1st Earl of Cork (b. 1578)
- December 27 – Francisco Pérez de Valenzuela, Spanish noble (b. 1528)
- After December 18 – Minye Kyawswa II of Ava, Burmese defecting crown prince of the Toungoo Empire (killed by invading forces) (b. 1567)
- date unknown – Chand Bibi, Indian regent and warrior (b. 1550)
