= Mikawa Kokubun-ji =

Buddhist temple in Toyokawa, Aichi, Japan

- 三河国分寺
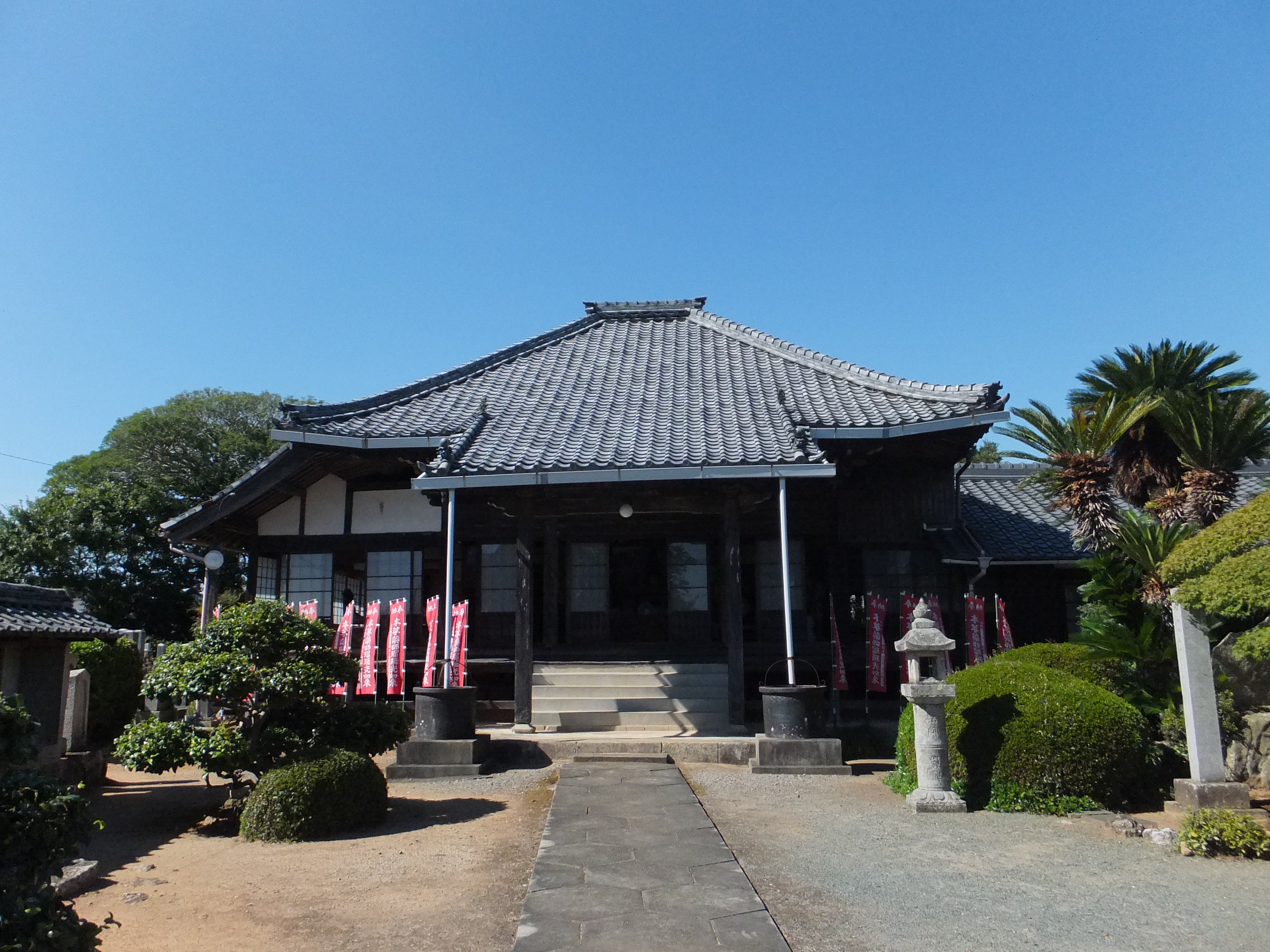
- Former Main Hall of Mikawa Kokubun-ji

- Location within Aichi Prefecture Location within Japan

Religion
- Affiliation: Buddhist
- Deity: Yakushi Nyōrai
- Rite: Sōtō
- Status: functional

Location
- Location: Hachiman-chō Hongo 31, Toyokawa-shi, Aichi-ken
- Country: Japan
- Interactive map of Mikawa Kokubun-ji
- Coordinates: 34°50′17.45″N 137°20′32.43″E

Architecture
- Founder: Emperor Shōmu
- Completed: 741
- National Important Cultural Property National Historic Site of Japan

The Mikawa Kokubun-ji (三河国分寺) is a Buddhist temple located in the Yawata neighborhood of the city of Toyokawa, Aichi, Japan. The temple belongs to the Sōtō school of Japanese Zen. Its main image is a statue of Yakushi Nyōrai. It is the modern successor of one of the provincial temples established by Emperor Shōmu during the Nara period (710–794) for the purpose of promoting Buddhism as the national religion of Japan and standardising control of imperial rule over the provinces.

The site of the original temple was designated as a National Historic Site in 1922, with the area under protection expanded in 2019.

== Mikawa Kokubun-ji ruins ==
The Shoku Nihongi records that in 741, as the country recovered from a major smallpox epidemic, Emperor Shōmu ordered that a monastery and nunnery be established in every province, the kokubunji (国分寺).

The Mikawa Kokubun-ji is located in the southern end of the alluvial plateau (Yahata Plateau) between the Otowa River and the Shirakawa River, west of Toyokawa city, in eastern Aichi Prefecture. In addition to the remains of the Mikawa Kokubun-niji provincial nunnery, the remains of the provincial capital of Mikawa Province (Shiratori Ruins) and Funayama No. 1 Kofun (the largest ancient tomb in eastern Mikawa) are also located in the vicinity.

The exact date that the Mikawa Kokubun-ji was founded is not known. It was long assumed that the temple was constructed in 741 as the provincial temple of Mikawa Province; however, recent excavations indicate that the pagoda was erected before the other structures in the temple. This implies that a temple already existed on this site, but was remodeled accordance with the standardized Shichidō garan formation, similar to Tōdai-ji in Nara, the template upon which the kokubunji temples were based, at some later date. Also, from the style of the onigawara roof tiles, the temple appears to have been built somewhat later than the kokubunji temples in other provinces. The temple's bell is estimated to date to the early Heian period.

The layout of the original temple was 180 meters square, and it was originally surrounded by an earthen wall. Archaeological excavations have discovered the foundations of the South Gate, Central Gate, Kondō and Lecture Hall, as wells as the foundations of the surrounding cloister. The 16.8 meters square foundation stones for the pagoda have been exposed since antiquity.

Per the Engishiki records, the temple was allowed a revenue of 20,000 koku of rice land for its upkeep in 927 AD. Subsequent changes to the temple are unclear, and the temple appears to have been abandoned around the end of the 10th century.

The inner gate and part of the corridor of the ancient temple have been restored as full-scale buildings directly above the remains. In addition, the Mikawa Tenpyō Village Museum (三河天平の里資料館) opposite the site exhibits onigawara tiles and other items excavated from the Mikawa Kokubun-ji ruins. It is located about 20 minutes on foot from Kokufu Station on the Meitetsu Nagoya Main Line.

== Gallery ==
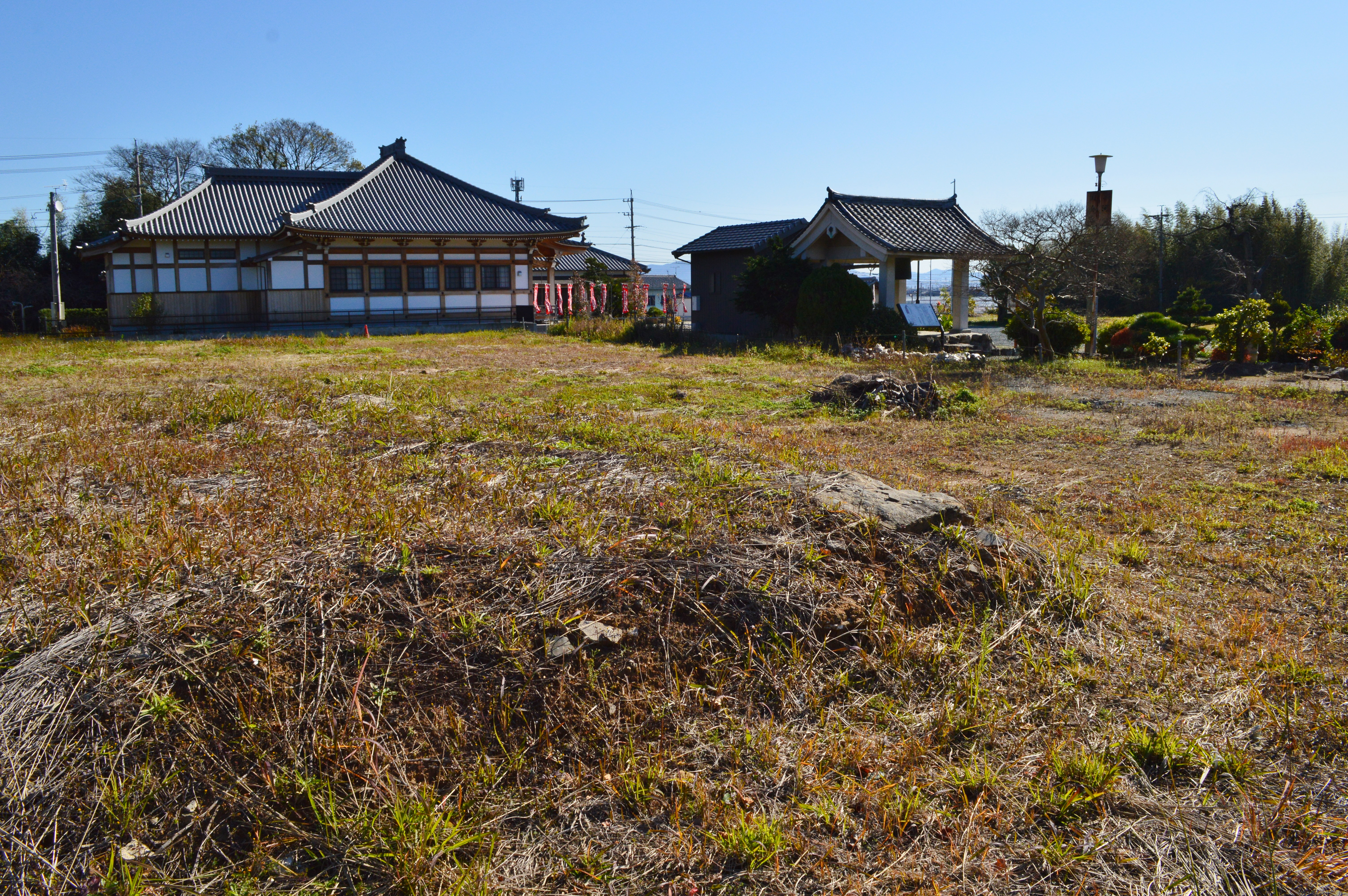
Site of the Kondō

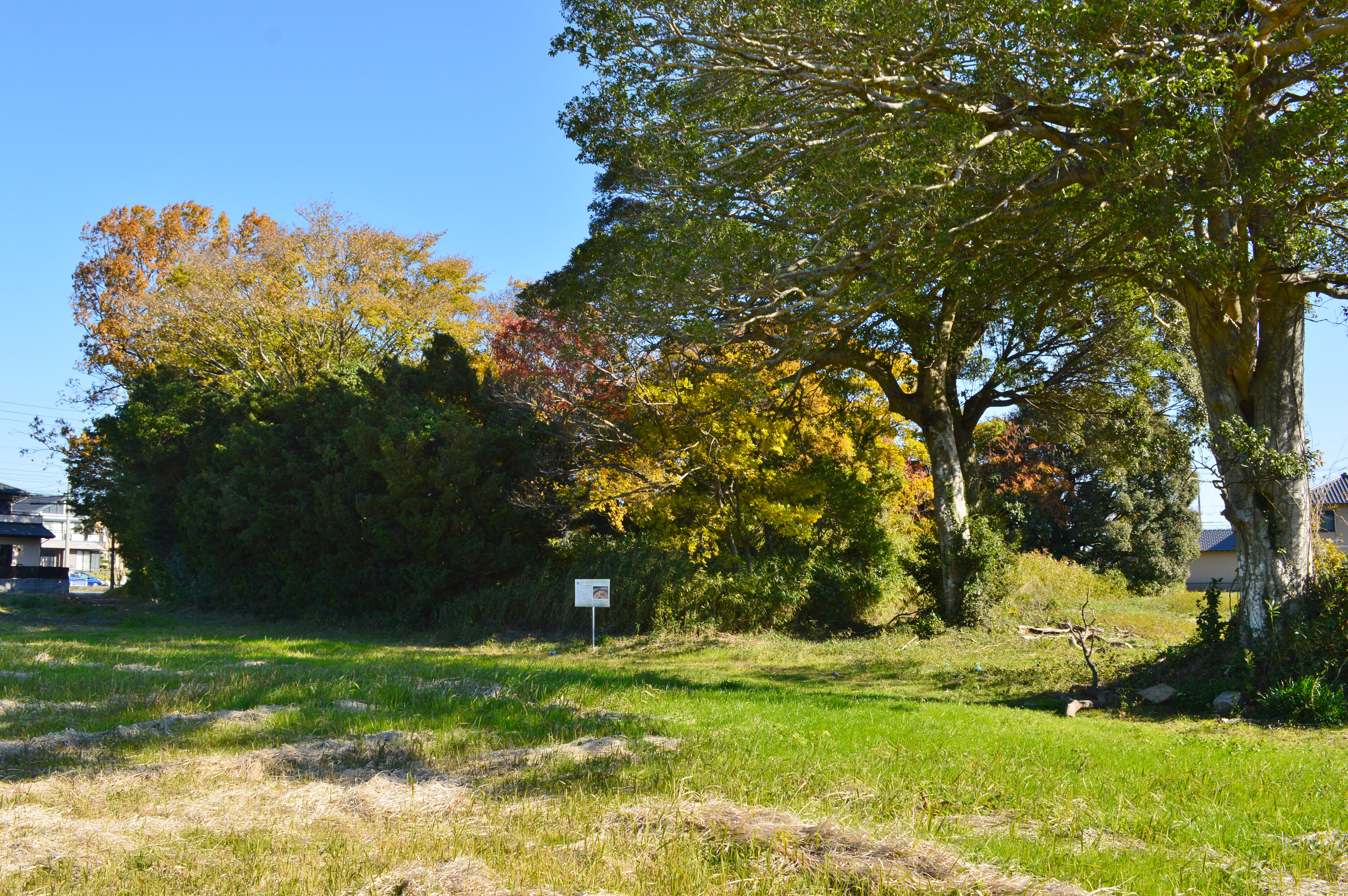
Site of Lecture Hall

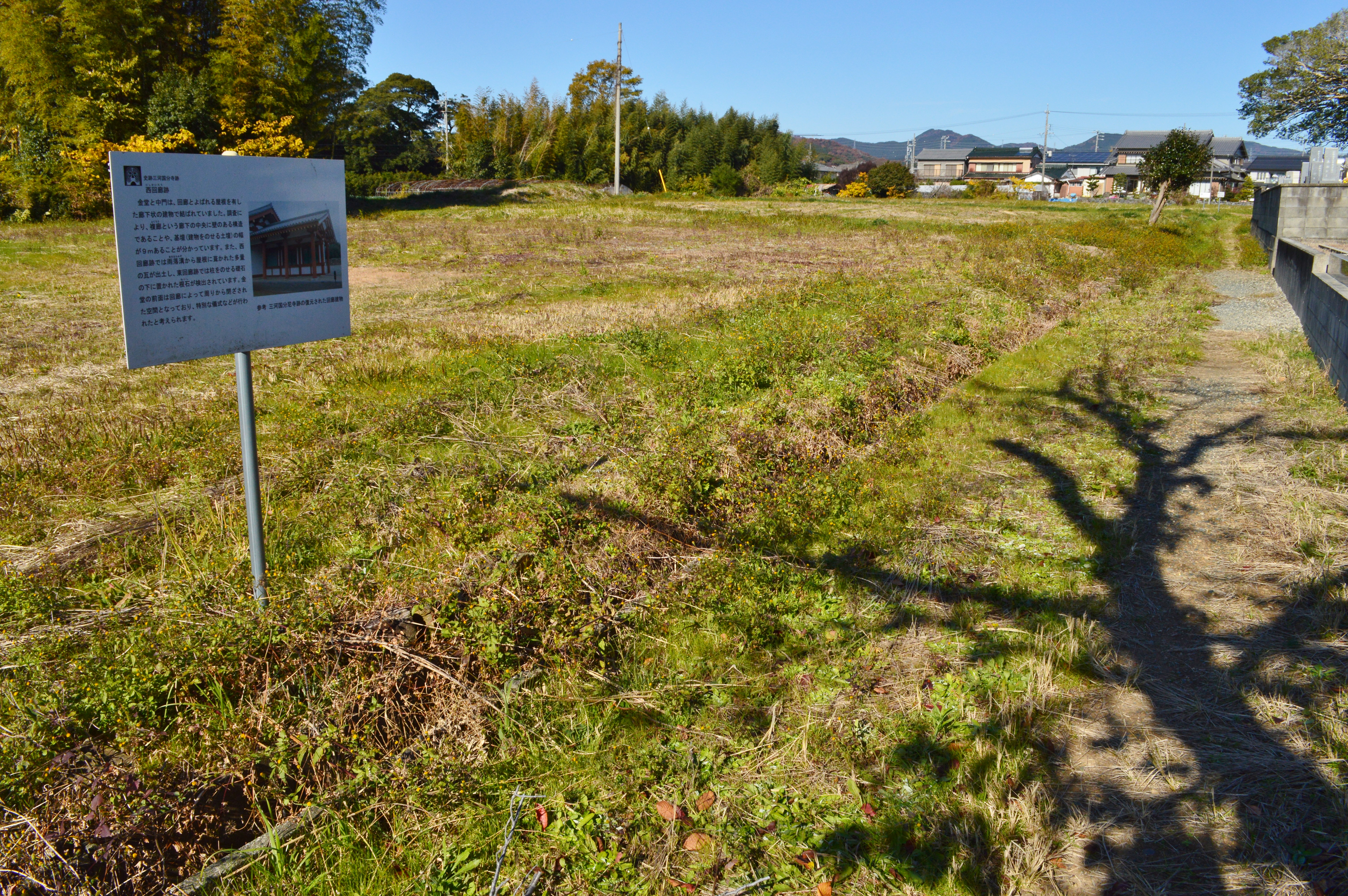
Site of Eastern Cloister

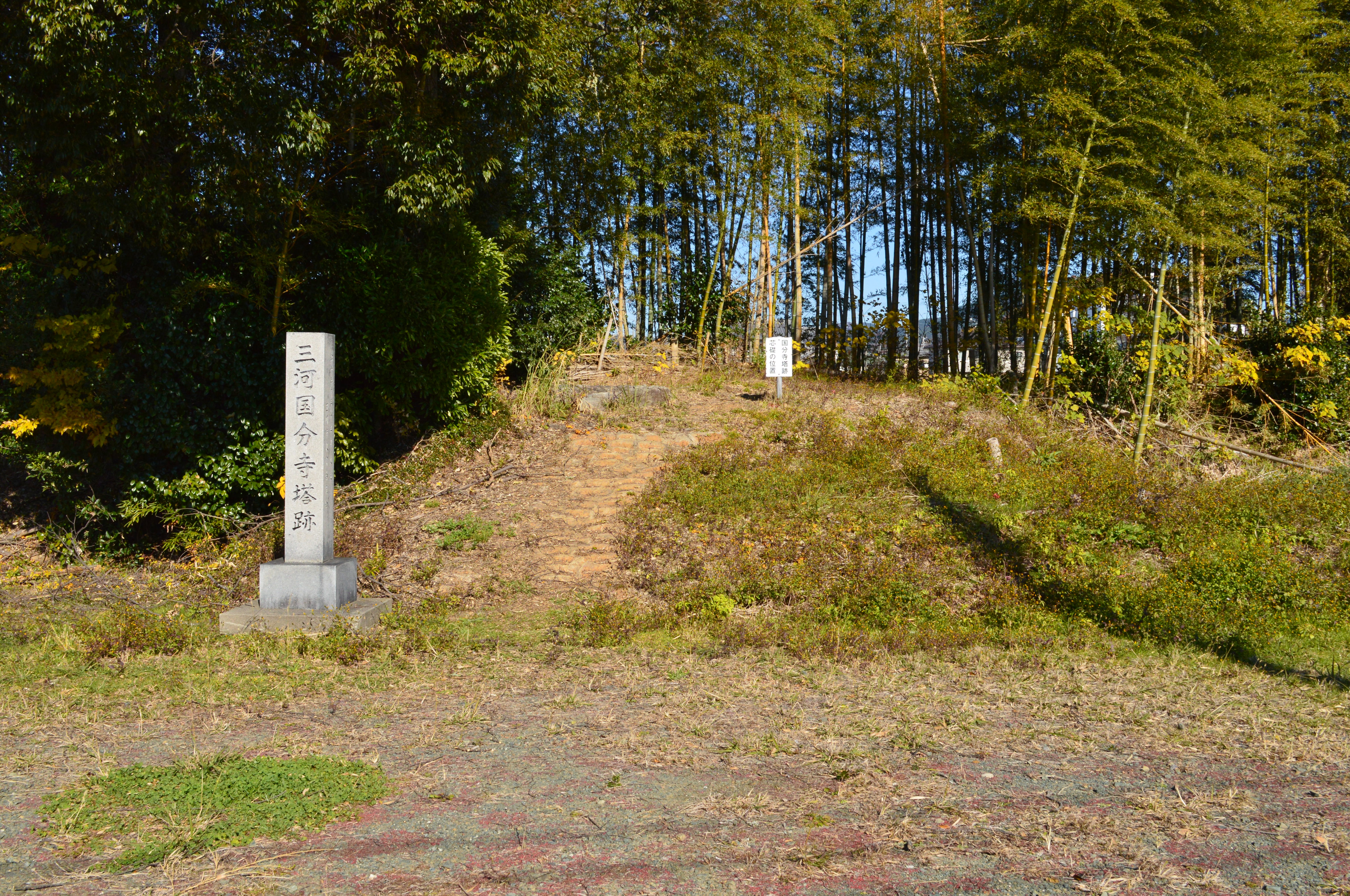
Site of Pagoda

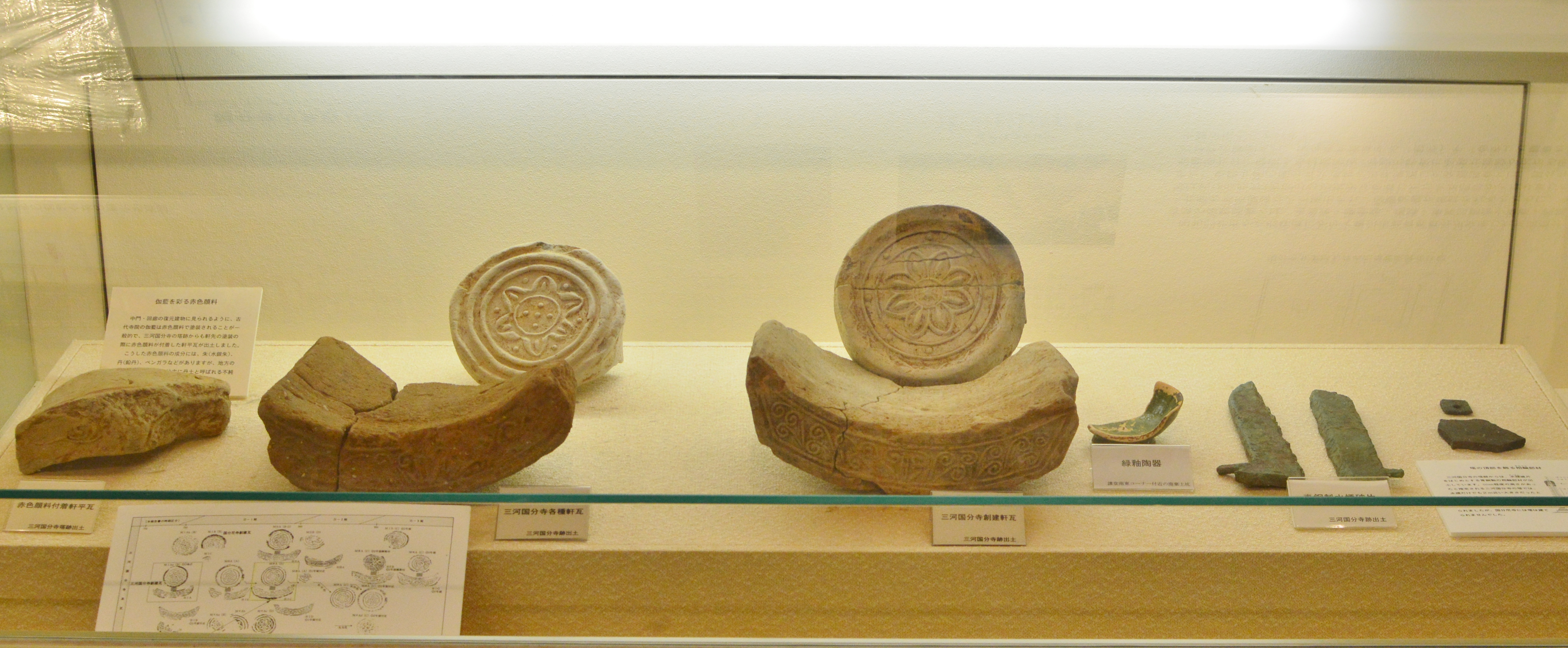
Excavated roof tiles

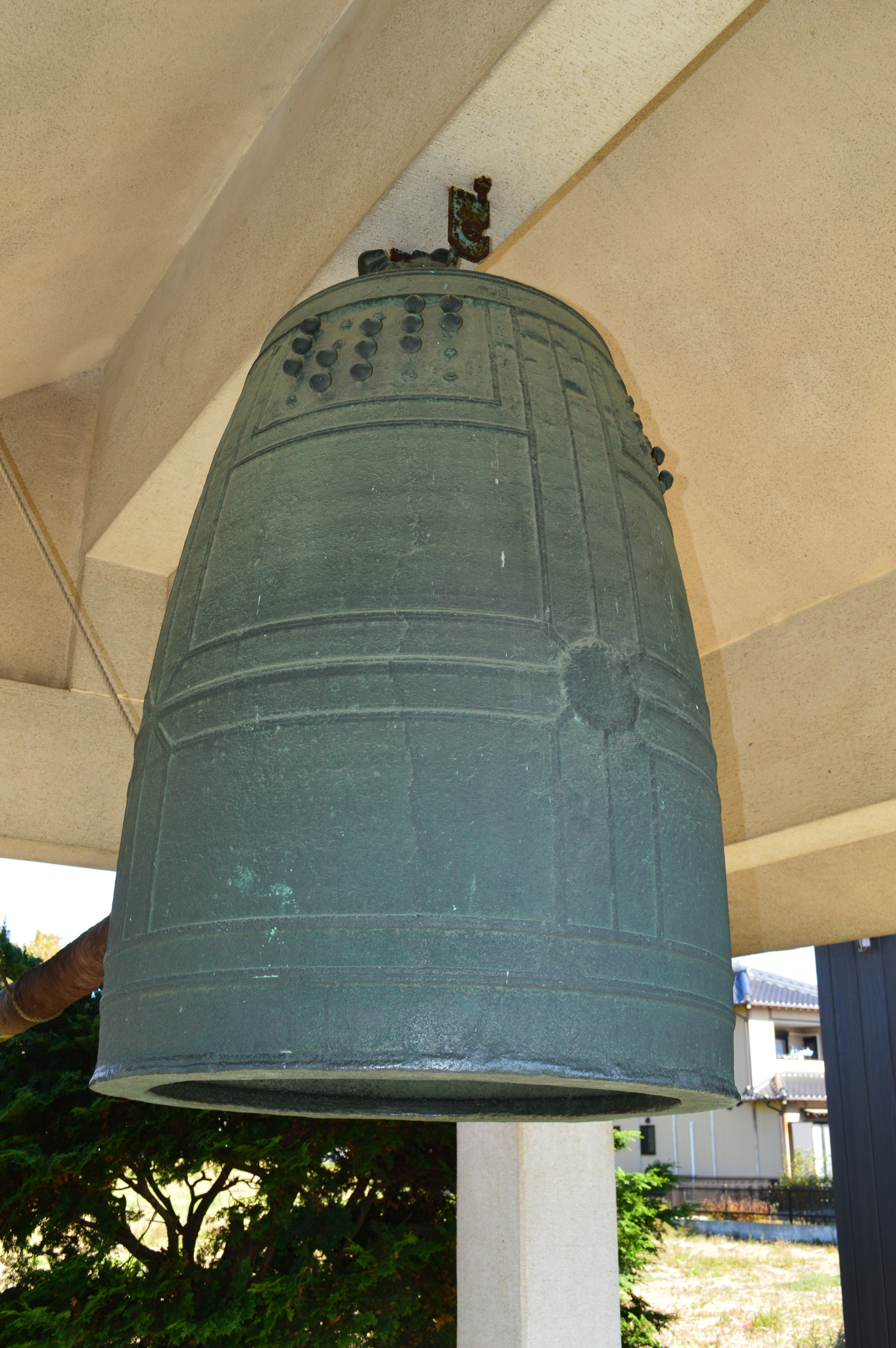
Bell (ICP)

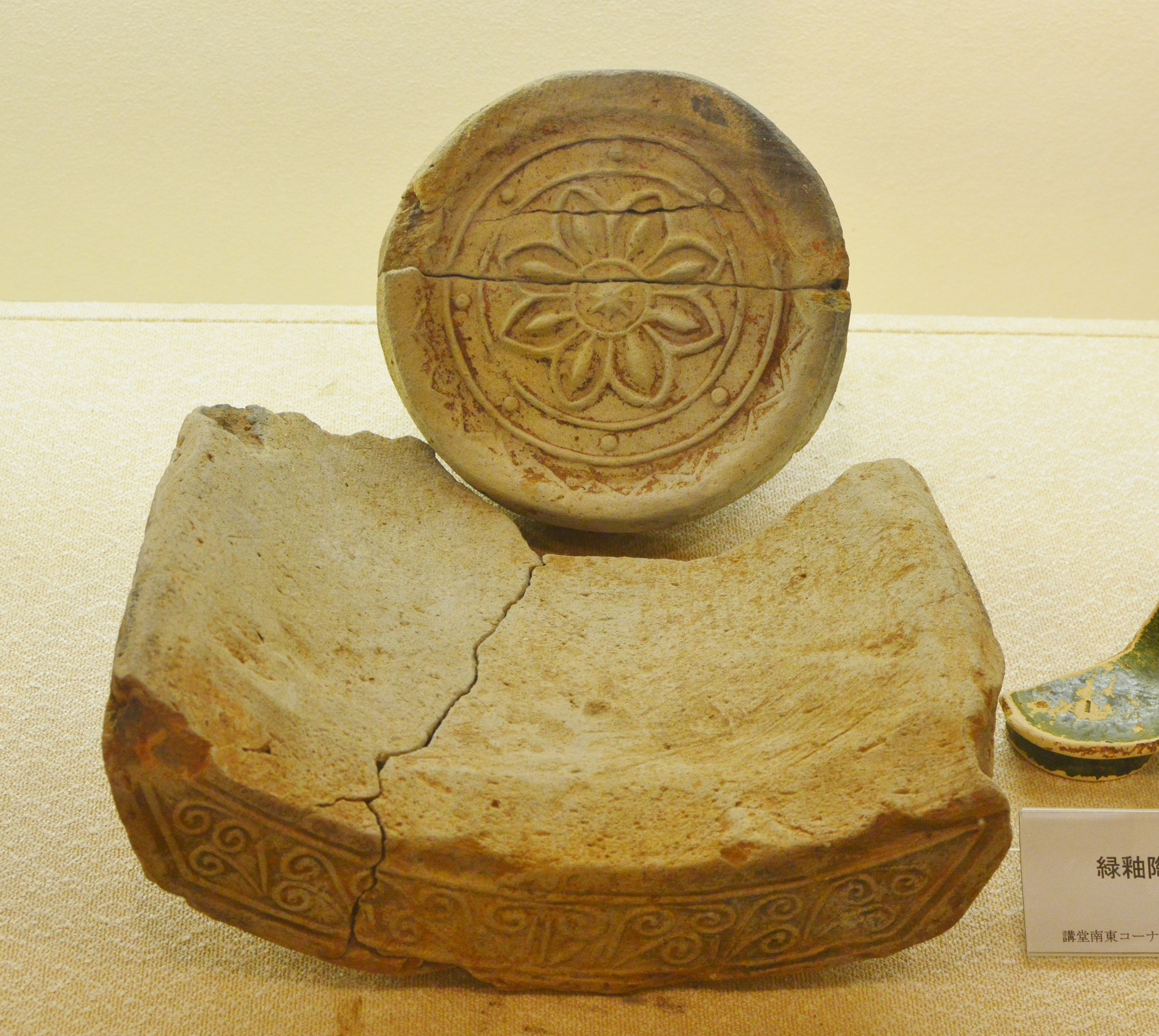
Excavated roof tiles

== Modern Mikawa Kokubun-ji ==
The Mikawa Kokubun-ji was restored during the Eishō era (1504-1521) of the Sengoku period under the sponsorship of the Imagawa clan, and the temple was renamed the Hachiman Kokubun-ji, indicating a connection with a nearby Hachiman shrine. Under Imagawa Ujizane both the temple and the shrine were under the control of Zaigai-ji in Toyokawa. The reconstructed temple belongs to the Sōtō sect of Japanese Zen. In 1649, under the Tokugawa shogunate, the temple had an assigned kokudaka of over five koku for its upkeep. The temple has a standing wooden statue of Yakushi Nyorai from the Heian period. This statue is designated a Tangible Cultural Property of Aichi Prefecture; however, it was brought to this temple from the neighboring Hachiman shrine in the early Meiji period due to the shinbutsu bunri policies of the Meiji government.

The temple grounds were excavated from 1985 to 1988 and again from 2007 to 2009 and 2019. The grounds of the rebuilt temple were confirmed to overlap the remains of the ancient temple, but the overall precincts have shifted slightly eastward.The Main Hall of the modern temple was found to have been built on the foundations of the Kondō of the Nara period temple.

== Cultural Properties ==
=== Important Cultural Properties ===
- Bonshō (梵鐘), early-Heian period (1440/1462) The bell is unsigned, and has a height of 118 cm, circumference of 256 cm, opening of 82.4 cm and a weight of 687 kilograms.

=== Aichi Prefecture Designated Tangible Cultural Properties ===
- Wooden statue of seated Yakushi Nyorai (木造薬師如来坐像), Heian period; The statue was originally enshrined at Hachimangu Shrine, but was transferred to Mikawa Kokubun-ji following the separation of Shinto and Buddhism

== See also ==
- List of Historic Sites of Japan (Aichi)
- provincial temple
- Mikawa Kokubun-niji
