= Hokke-ikki =

Rebels following Nichiren Buddhism in Japan

The Hokke-ikki (法華一揆) were a group of rebels who followed Nichiren (Hokke) Buddhism in Kyoto around the year 1532. Followers of the Nichiren sect refer to the rebellions and subsequent suppression of the Nichiren sect as the "Tenmon Persecution" (天文法難).

== Background ==
When Nichizō, one of the successors of Nichiren, first entered Kyoto in 1293, he was expelled several times by the Imperial Court due to the complaints of the monks at Enryaku-ji on Mount Hiei, but was eventually allowed to enter. He petitioned for the Nichiren sect to be granted official recognition by the Imperial Court, a request that would eventually be granted.

By the Tenbun Era, the Nichiren sect had spread to many townspeople (machi-shu, 町衆) in Kyoto, and was gaining strength, centering around Nichiren temples such as Honkoku-ji. In 1532, the Ikkō-ikki attacked Kyoto, and the Nichiren sect fought against them alongside Hosokawa Harumoto, Rokkaku Sadayori, and Kizawa Nagamasa, under the command of the shogun Ashikaga Yoshiharu. During the attack several Jōdo Shinshū temples in Kyoto such as the Yamashina Hongan-ji were razed and burned by both the samurai defending the city as well as a group of zealous Nichiren townspeople.

After this event, the Nichiren sect gained autonomy in the city of Kyoto, refused to pay land taxes, and expanded its influence in Kyoto over the span of five years. This expansion of the Hokke sect's influence is called the "Hokke-ikki" (法華一揆) by other sects.

On March 3, 1536, a debate took place between Nichiren laymen and the Tendai sect, which saw the Nichiren sect successful.

When rumors spread that Enryaku-ji monks had been defeated in argument by ordinary Nichiren sect followers, Enryaku-ji felt humiliated and asked the Muromachi Shogunate to stop calling itself the "Hokke sect". However, the Shogunate ruled in favor of Nichiren, citing the imperial charter of Emperor Go-Daigo in 1334, and Enryaku-ji lost the case as well. The historian Akira Imaya has argued that the Shogunate deliberately ruled in favor of Nichiren, thereby fanning the flames of conflict between the two sects.

The Rokuon Nichirokuki records that on May 23, rumors spread that the Nichiren sect would take up camp at Shokoku-ji Temple. In response to these rumors, Inryoken's owner met with the shogun and informed him that he would strengthen his defenses. On May 29, the moat around Shokoku-ji Temple was dug. On June 16, a tower was erected in the moat at the east gate. In the midst of this, someone appeared to mediate between the two sides. On May 29, Rokkaku Sadayori of Omi came to Kyoto. In July, Kizawa Nagamasa also tried to mediate. However, no agreement was reached.

On June 1, Enryaku-ji Temple held a meeting and resolved to annihilate the Kyoto Hokke sect. The resolution was reported to the Imperial Court and reported to the shogunate.

In July, a group of Enryaku-ji's warrior monks set out to destroy the Hokke sect. The masses of the entire Enryaku-ji temple gathered together and demanded that the 21 Nichiren sect temples in and around Kyoto become branch temples of Enryaku-ji and pay tribute .

However, the Nichiren sect rejected Enryaku-ji's request. After its request was rejected, Enryaku-ji asked the Imperial Court and the Shogunate for permission to defeat the Nichiren sect, and sought cooperation from the Echizen lord Asakura Takakage, as well as from other sects that were enemies of Enryaku-ji, such as Hongan-ji, Kofuku-ji, Onjo-ji, and To-ji. All of them refused to send reinforcements to Enryaku-ji, but promised to remain neutral . Hongan-ji sent 30,000 hiki on July 7.

=== The forces of both sides ===
According to the Yuzakki, the number of soldiers of Enryaku-ji Temple was 150,000, according to the Gensuke Ounenki it was 60,000, and according to the Nijō-ji Shuke-ki it was 30,000 including the main temple and its branch temples, plus 30,000 soldiers from the Ōmi daimyo Rokkaku Sadayori and 3,000 soldiers from Mii-dera. In contrast, according to the Yuzakki, the number of soldiers of the Nichiren sect was over 20,000 including soldiers from 21 temples .

== Tenbun Hokke Rebellion ==
Around July 20, Enryaku-ji Temple stationed tens of thousands of warrior monks from its branch temples in various provinces at the foot of Higashiyama, and 30,000 troops from Omi led by Rokkaku Sadayori and Yoshikata and Gamo Sadahide were deployed in Higashiyama, with 3,000 soldiers from Mii-dera Temple deployed to the north, completely blocking off the north and east of Kyoto. In response, 20,000 to 30,000 followers of the Nichiren sect strengthened their defenses in and around Kyoto.

On July 22, the battle at Matsugasaki broke out between the two sides. The Rokuon Nichirokuki records that the Nichiren sect fired first, but some sources say that the Enryakuji sect fired first.

Initially, the Nichiren sect had been digging fortified ditches in Kyoto since late May in preparation for an attack on Enryaku-ji Temple, so the Nichiren sect was initially favored in the battle, but on July 27, the Rokkaku army invaded from Shijoguchi and set fire to the temple, burning down all of the 21 Nichiren sect temples except Honkoku-ji Temple. Then, on the 28th, Honkoku-ji Temple was also burned down.

It is said that the Nichiren sect's casualties in this battle were as high as 10,000.

Furthermore, fires set by the Enryaku-ji and Rokkaku forces led to a major fire that burned down the entire Shimogyo district of Kyoto and about one-third of the Kamigyo district. The scale of damage caused by the fires was greater than that of the Onin War.

== Aftermath ==
After the rebellion, the once-prosperous Nichiren sect in Kyoto was annihilated, and its followers were exiled from the capital, with many of them fleeing to Sakai.

On October 7, 1536, the shogunate issued a three-article prohibition to the Nichiren sect, which prohibited Nichiren sect monks from wandering around Kyoto and beyond, from returning to secular life and joining other sects, and from rebuilding temples .

For the next six years, Nichiren Buddhism was banned in Kyoto. In 1542, with the help of Rokkaku Sadayori, the Imperial Court granted permission for the Nichiren sect to return to Kyoto. In 1543, Enryaku-ji Temple protested against the permission. In response, the Nichiren sect turned to Rokkaku Sadayori, who mediated between the two sides .

In 1547, through Sadayori's mediation, a peace agreement was reached between Enryaku-ji and the Nichiren sect. After that, 15 of the 21 Nichiren sect temples were rebuilt.

In addition, Honkokuji Temple rebuilt its main hall on August 10, the year the peace agreement was concluded, and a ceremony to enshrine the main battle was held.
