= Tenbun =

Period of Japanese history (1532–1555)

Tenbun (天文), also transliterated as Tenmon, was a Japanese era name (年号, nengō; "year name") after Kyōroku and before Kōji. This period spanned from July 1532 through October 1555. The reigning emperor was Go-Nara-tennō (後奈良天皇).

== Change of era ==
- 1532 Tenbun gannen (天文元年): At the request of Ashikaga Yoshiharu, the 12th shōgun of the Muromachi Bakufu, the era name was changed because of various battles. The previous era ended and a new one commenced in Kyōroku 5, on the 29th day of the 7th month.

== Events of the Tenbun era ==
- 23 September 1532 (Tenbun 1, 24th day of the 8th month): Yamashina Hongan-ji set on fire. Hokke Riot in Kyōto.
- 29 March 1535 (Tenbun 4, 26th day of the 2nd month): Go-Nara is formally installed as emperor.
- 7 July 1541 (Tenbun 10, 14th day of the 6th month): Takeda Harunobu (later Takeda Shingen) banishes his father, Takeda Nobutora.
- 4 September 1542 (Tenbun 11, 25th day of the 8th month): Imagawa Yoshimoto, who was daimyō of Suruga Province, conquered Tōtōmi Province; and from there, he entered Mikawa Province where he battled the daimyō of Owari Province, Oda Nobuhide. The Imagawa forces were defeated by the Oda army.
- 24 September 1543 (Tenbun 12, 25th day of the 8th month): Portuguese ship drifts ashore at Tanegashima, and the gun is first introduced into Japan.
- July/August 1544 (Tenbun 13, 7th month): Flooding in Heian-kyō and nearby areas.
- 11 January 1546 (Tenbun 15, 20th day of the 12th month): Ashikaga Yoshifushi becomes 13th Shōgun of the Ashikaga shogunate.
- 1547 (Tenbun 16): Joseon-Japanese "Treaty of Tenbun", trading limited to Joseon port of Pusan and Sō clan commerce limited to 20 ships annually.
- 28 January 1548 (Tenbun 17, 30th day of the 12th month): Nagao Kagetora (later Uesugi Kenshin) replaces his older brother Nagao Harukage as heir to Echigo Province, with triumphant entry in Kasugayama Castle.
- 23 March 1549 (Tenbun 18, 24th day of the 2nd month): Nōhime, daughter of Saitō Dōsan, daimyō of Mino Province, marries Oda Nobunaga.
- 27 July 1549 (Tenbun 18, 3rd day of the 7th month): Jesuit Catholic priest Francis Xavier arrives to Kagoshima.
- 15 December 1549 (Tenbun 18, 27th day of the 11th month): Matsudaira clan of Mikawa Province fall under Imagawa Yoshimoto's rule. Matsudaira Takechiyo (later Tokugawa Ieyasu) departs for Imagawa as a hostage.
- September 1551 (Tenbun 20, 8th month): Tainei-ji incident – Sue Takafusa (later Sue Harukata) leads a coup d'etat within the Ōuchi clan, forcing the head of the clan, Ōuchi Yoshitaka, to commit suicide at Tainei-ji temple. Ōuchi vassal Mōri Motonari would soon defeat Takafusa at the Battle of Miyajima in 1555.
- March/April 1554 (Tenbun 23, 2nd month): Shogun Yoshifushi changes his name to Yoshiteru.

== Notes ==
Preceded by Kyōroku	Era or nengō Tenbun; 1532–1555	Succeeded by Kōji
