= Mikawa Kokubunni-ji =

Mikawa Kokubun-niji
- 三河国分尼寺
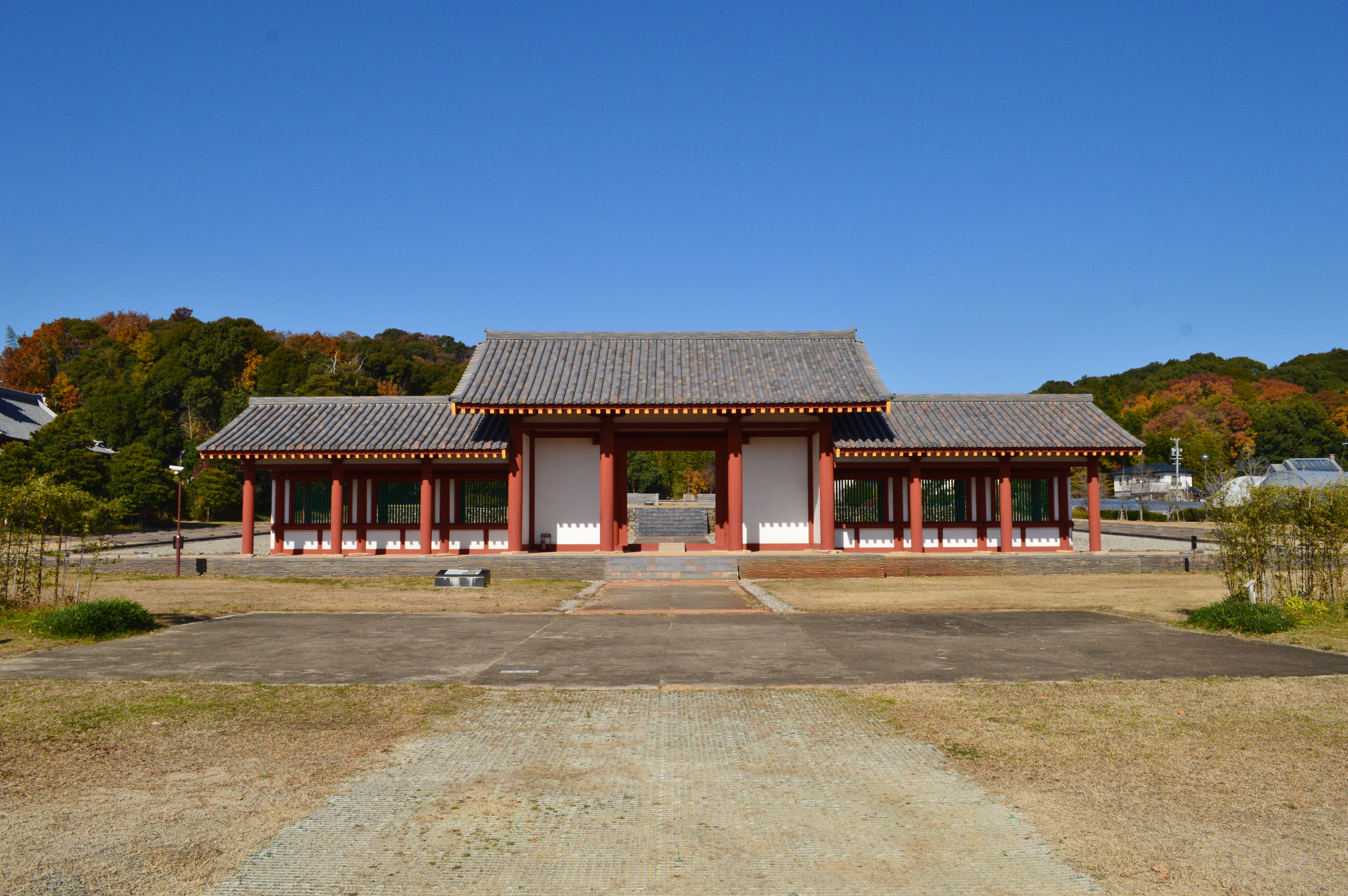
- Reconstructed Middle Gate of Mikawa Kokubun-niji

- Location within Aichi Prefecture Location within Japan

Religion
- Affiliation: Buddhist
- Status: ruins

Location
- Location: Hachiman-chō Hongo 31, Toyokawa-shi, Aichi-ken
- Country: Japan
- Coordinates: 34°50′26.18″N 137°20′41.37″E

Architecture
- Founder: Emperor Shōmu
- Completed: 741

Mikawa Kokubun-niji (三河国分尼寺) is a Buddhist nunnery located in the Yahata neighborhood of the city of Toyokawa, Aichi, Japan. It is the modern successor of one of the provincial temples established by Emperor Shōmu during the Nara period (710 – 794) for the purpose of promoting Buddhism as the national religion of Japan and standardising control of the imperial rule over the provinces.

The site of the nunnery was designated as a National Historic Site in 1922, with the area under protection expanded in 1972.

== History ==
The Shoku Nihongi records that in 741, as the country recovered from a major smallpox epidemic, Emperor Shōmu ordered that a monastery and nunnery be established in every province, the kokubunji (国分寺). While the locations of many of the kokubun-ji temples is known, the sites of the nunneries are comparatively rare.

The exact date that the Mikawa Kokubun-niji was founded is not known, and it is assumed that to have been constructed in 741 together with the neighboring Mikawa Kokubun-ji. The temple measured 150 meters square, and followed the standardized Shichidō garan layout of buildings, similar to Tōdai-ji in Nara, upon which the kokubunji temples were based, but on a one-third scale. However, per recent archaeological excavations, it was found that the construction of this nunnery was somewhat after the adjacent monastery, and that the Lecture Hall and kitchen were built earlier than the Kondō, Belfry, Cloister and Kyōzō. From the style of the roof tiles uncovered, it can be estimated that the temple dates from the Keiun era (767-770 AD). Despite being smaller in overall size than the adjacent monastery, the size of the Kondō was the largest of any of the kokubun-niji thus excavated, and presence of a double cloister layout is unique.

The history of the nunnery and when it was destroyed is completely unknown, but it vanished from historical records before the end of the Heian period. The ruins were discovered in 1920. The site was excavated in 1967 as part of a farmland improvement project, at which time the foundations of the Kondō, South Gate and eastern cloister were discovered outside the 1922 borders of the existing National Historic Site, so these borders were redrawn in 1972.

Currently, the site is maintained as part of the Mikawa Kokubunji Ruins Historic Site Park, and the red-painted middle gate and part of the corridor have been restored as full-scale buildings. It is located about a 25-minute walk from Kokufu Station on the Meitetsu Nagoya Main Line.

== Gallery ==
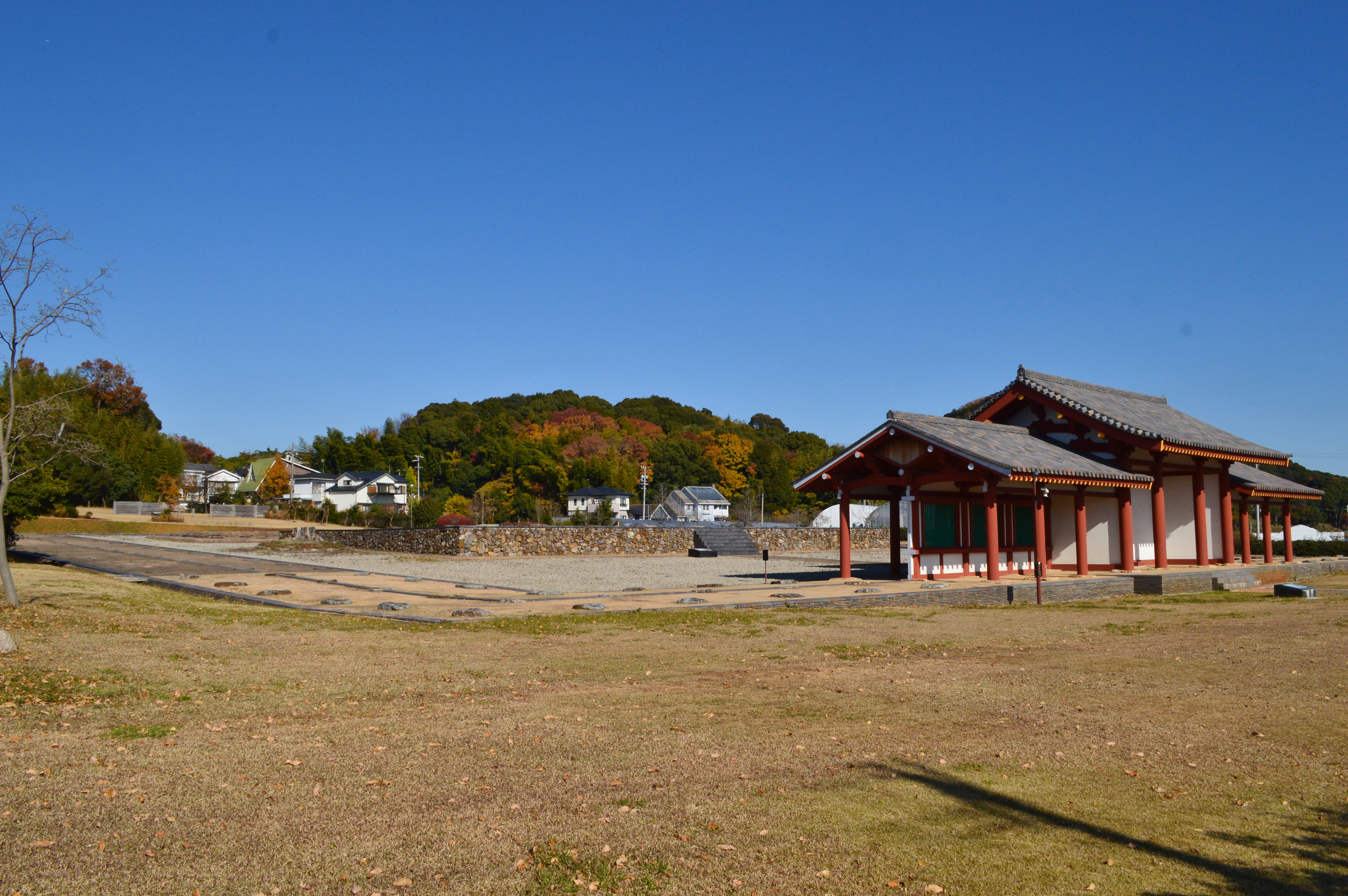
Overview

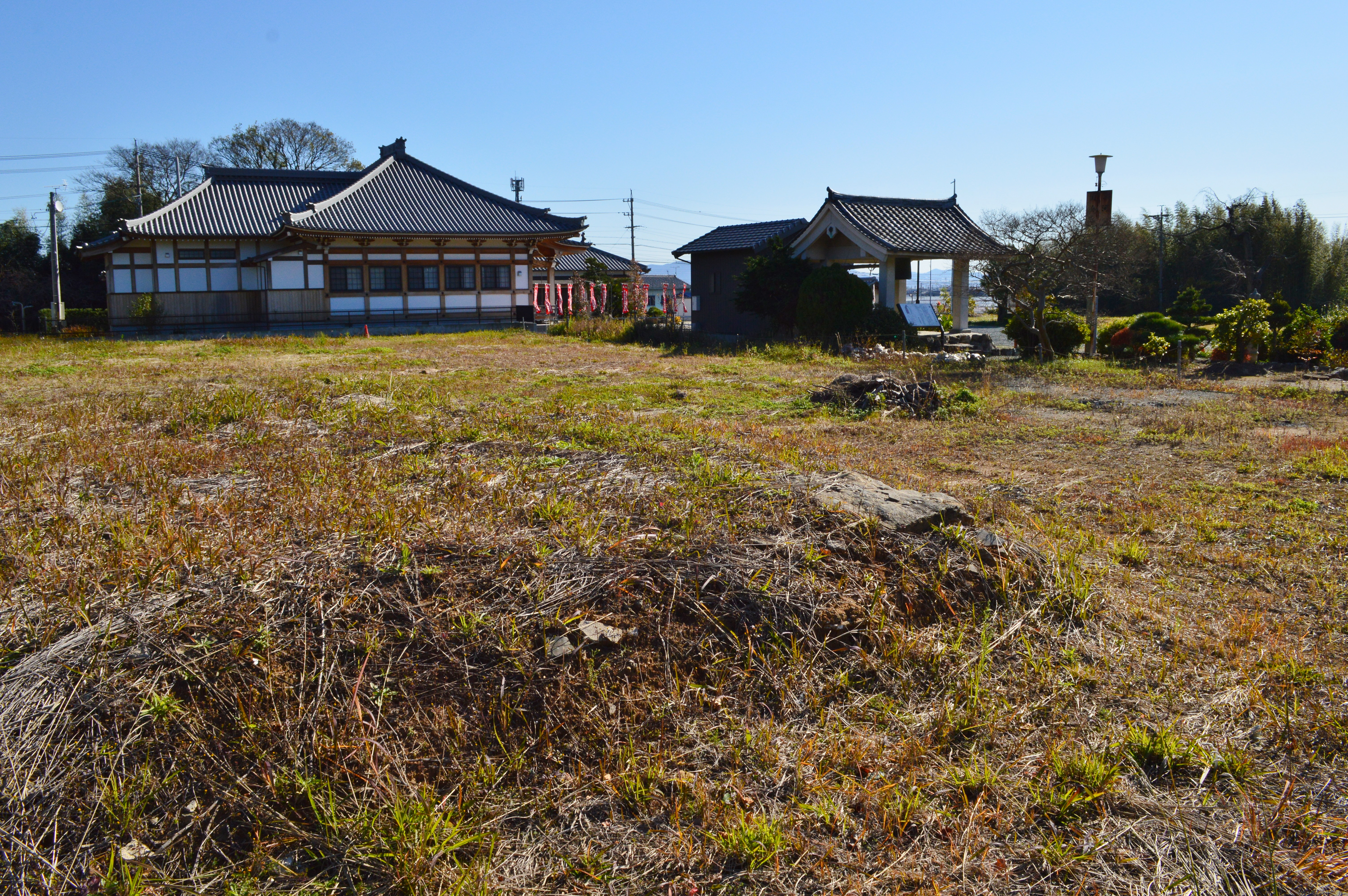
Site of Kondō

== See also ==
- List of Historic Sites of Japan (Aichi)
- provincial temple
