= Kyōroku =

Period of Japanese history (1528–1532)

Kyōroku (享禄) was a Japanese era name (年号, nengō, "year name") after Daiei and before Tenbun. This era spanned from August 1528 to July 1532. The reigning emperor was Go-Nara-tennō (後奈良天皇).

== Change of era ==
- 1528 Kyōroku gannen (享禄元年): The era name was changed to mark the enthronement of Emperor Go-Nara. The previous era ended and a new one commenced in Daiei 8, the 20th day of the 8th month.

This nengō takes its name from the I Ching: "He who sits on the Imperial Throne enjoys Heaven's Favor (居天位享天禄).

== Events of the Kyōroku era ==
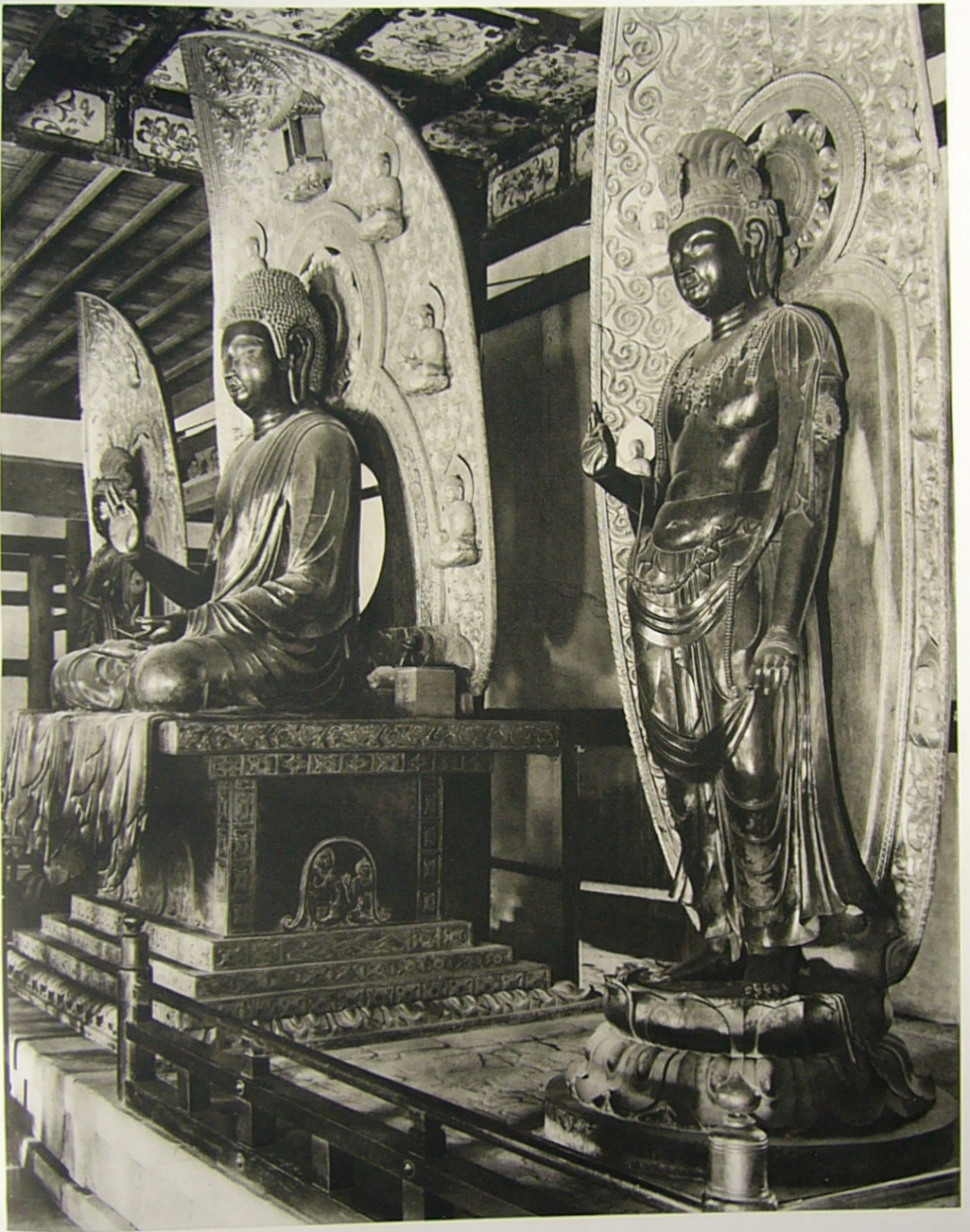
Statues were blackened in the fire at Yakushi-ji in 1528.

- 1528 (Kyōroku 1): Fire damaged Yakushi-ji in Nara.
- 1528 (Kyōroku 1): Former kampaku Konoe Tanye became sadaijin. The former naidaijin, Minamoto-no Mitsikoto, becomes the udaijin. Former dainagon Kiusho Tanemitsi becomes naidaijin.
- 1529 (Kyōroku 2): Neo-Confucian scholar Wang Yangming died.
- 1530 (Kyōroku 3, 7th month): The former-kampaku Kiyusho Hisatsune died at the age of 63.
- 1531 (Kyōroku 4): The Kamakura shogunate office of shugo (governor) is abolished.
- 1532 (Kyōroku 5): Followers of the Ikko sect were driven out of Kyoto; and they settled in Osaka.

== Notes ==
Preceded by Daiei	Era or nengō Kyōroku; 1528–1532	Succeeded by Tenbun
