= Yamashina Mido =

Yamashina Hongan-ji
- 山科本願寺 (Japanese)
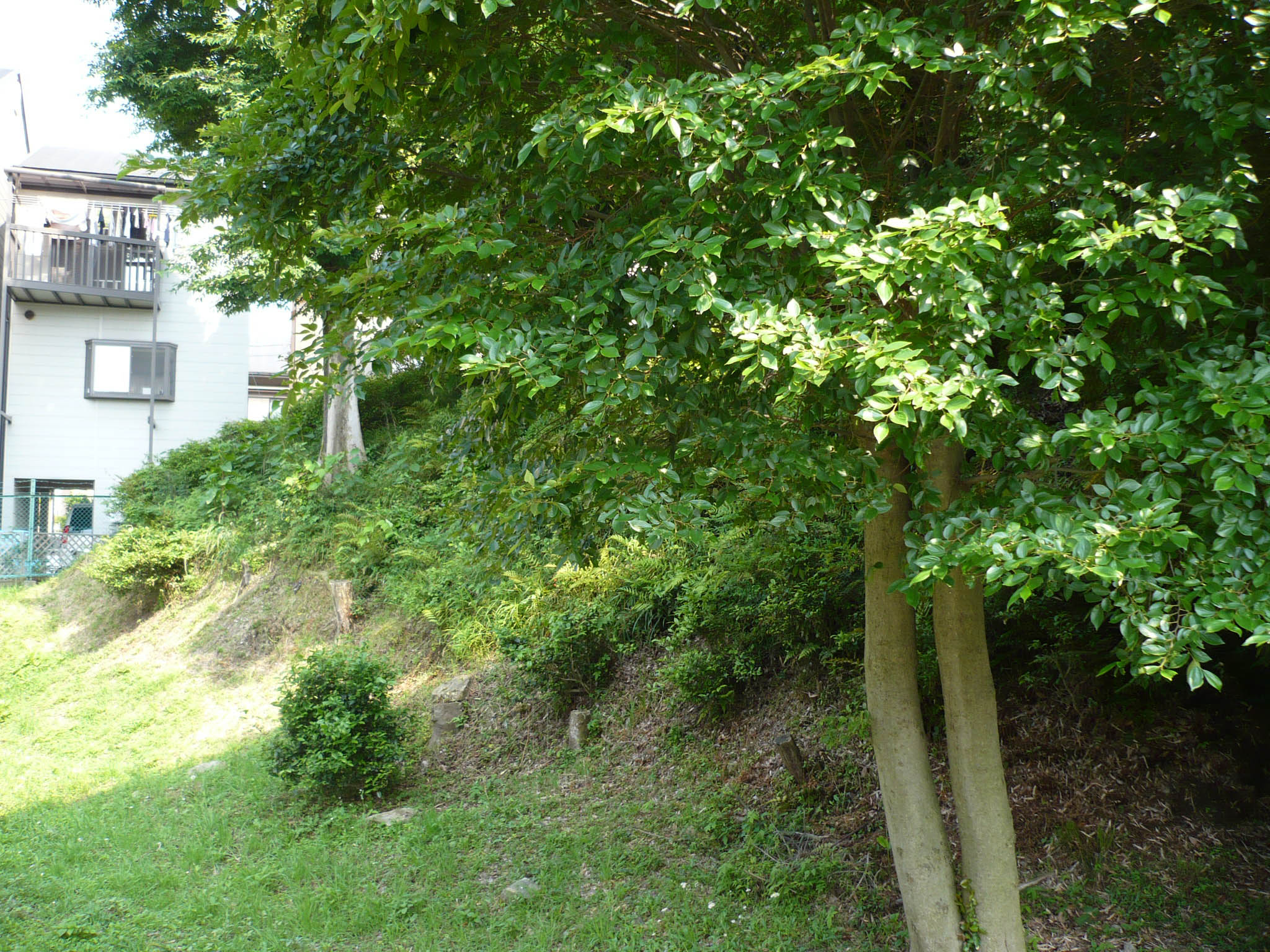
- Yamashina Hongan-ji earthworks ruins

- Yamashina Hongan-ji ruins Yamashina Mido (Japan)
- Interactive map of Yamashina Hongan-ji
- 34°59′4.5″N 135°48′44.7″E
- Type: fortified temple ruins
- Periods: Sengoku period
- Location: Yamashina-ku, Kyoto, Japan
- Region: Kinai region

History
- Built: 1478
- Abandoned: 1532

Site notes
- Public access: Yes (no facilities)

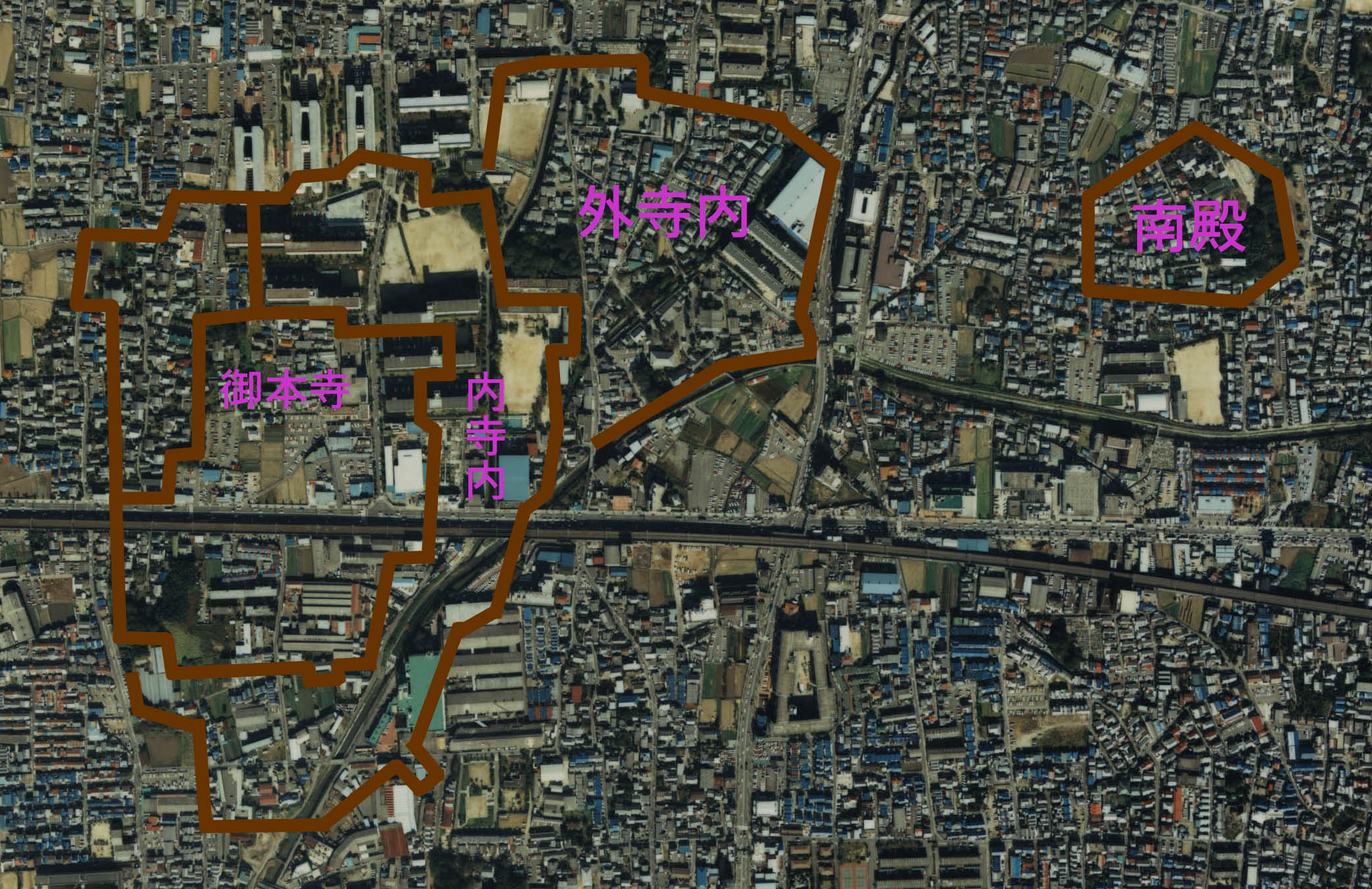
Yamashina Hongan-ji layout superimposed on a modern aerial photograph

Yamashina Midō (山科御堂), also known as Yamashina Hongan-ji (山科本願寺), was a fortified Buddhist temple located in what is now Yamashina-ku, Kyoto, Japan. Together with its fortified jōkamachi, it was a major center for the Ikkō-ikki, an organization of warrior monks and lay zealots who opposed samurai rule during the Sengoku period. Parts of its ruins were designated a National Historic Site in 2002.

== History ==
Yamashina Hongan-ji was completed in 1483 by Rennyo, abbot of the Jōdo Shinshū sect whose preachings spurred the creation of the Ikkō-ikki. Following the 1465 destruction of the chief Jōdo Shinshū temple, the Hongan-ji in Kyoto, Rennyo spent roughly a decade in the provinces, notably in Echizen Province, where the Ikkō-ikki had been most successful in overthrowing the secular hierarchy and where it had established the Yoshizaki Gobō fortified settlement. He returned to Kyoto by 1478, and after completion of the sect's new stronghold at Yamashina and the temple of Kōshō-ji to the south, left in 1496 for Osaka, where he would found the Ishiyama Hongan-ji.

The Yamashina Hongan-ji is located west of the center of the Yamashina Basin, at the confluence of the Shinomiya River and the Yamashina River (formerly the Otowa River). This area was a key transportation point, as it was the junction for both river traffic and where the Tōkaidō highway connected to the road to Uji. It is estimated that the size of the fortified settlement was one kilometer north-to-south and 0.8 kilometers east-to-west. A moat and earthworks were built around the temple, forming a temple town, with Rennyo bringing technicians and workers from Kaga Province. The "Kyohoin Nikki" from Tenbun 1 (1532) states that "the castle of Yamashina Honganji was built," so it was known as a "castle" from the start. Archaeological excavations have clarified the structure of the earthworks and moats. The earthworks were built by stacking layers of clay, soil, gravel, and stones alternately, and contemporary accounts and painting show that the walls were high, and were fortified with watchtowers at regular intervals. The moat was 12 meters wide and 4 meters deep. The layout of the fortification was with concentric circular enclosures, which predates similar designs for flatlands-style Japanese castles, and consisted of four major sections. The Gohonji (御本寺) was the equivalent to the inner bailey and contained the main religious structures. Currently, the surrounding area has been developed into residential land, and Japan National Route 1 and the Tokaido Shinkansen railway tracks cross it, so there is nothing remaining except part of the earthworks on the east side. The Uchijinai (内寺内) was equivalent to a castle's Ni-no-Maru, or second bailey. It contained the residences of Rennyo and his main lay followers. The main entrance to the temple complex was located in this area. The Sotoji-nai (外寺内) corresponded to a castle's San-no-Maru, or third bailey and contained the houses of merchants and craftsmen. After Rennyo's death, his mausoleum was built in this area. The Minami-den (南殿), or "Souther Hall" was Rennyo's retirement facility. An excavation in 2001 revealed defensive facilities such as a double moat, earthworks, fences, ditches, and remains of a watchtower-style building. Inside, a garden, a Buddhist hall, a moat, and other structures were constructed, some of the remains of which survive at Kōshō-ji.

Over the next several decades, the Yamashina Hongan-ji remained the central headquarters of the sect, even as the Ishiyama Hongan-ji and the city of Osaka grew in size and prominence. In the 1530s, the Ikkō-ikki began to undertake attacks on major religious centers in the cities as other bands of Ikkō mobs had done against samurai rulers in the provinces. The mobs attacked the Nichiren Kenpon-ji in Sakai, the Kōfuku-ji and Kasuga shrines in Nara, among other sites, and incurred the ire of both clergy and lay adherents to Nichiren and other sects. Kyoto, meanwhile, had been in the process, for decades, of being rebuilt following the extensive destruction of the city in the Ōnin War of 1467–1477. The rising urban merchant class consisted largely of adherents to the Nichiren-shu of Buddhism, and tensions soon led to attacks on the Ikkō-ikki in the city. In 1532, Hosokawa Harumoto and Rokkaku Sadayori led a combination of samurai and townspeople in attacking and destroying the Yamashina Hongan-ji on September 23, 1532.

Currently, the site is occupied by the Yamashina Betsu-in of the Jōdo Shinshū Hongan-ji school and the Shinshū Ōtani school, and the remains of the southern hall are located at Kōshō-ji of the Ōtani school, and the remains of the earthworks are in Yamashina Central Park. The remains of the southern hall and the earthworks were designated as a National Historic Site in 2002. The site is about a 15-minute walk from Higashino Station on the Kyoto Municipal Subway Tōzai Line.

== See also ==
- List of Historic Sites of Japan (Kyoto)
