= Eishō (Muromachi period) =

Period of Japanese history (1504–1521)

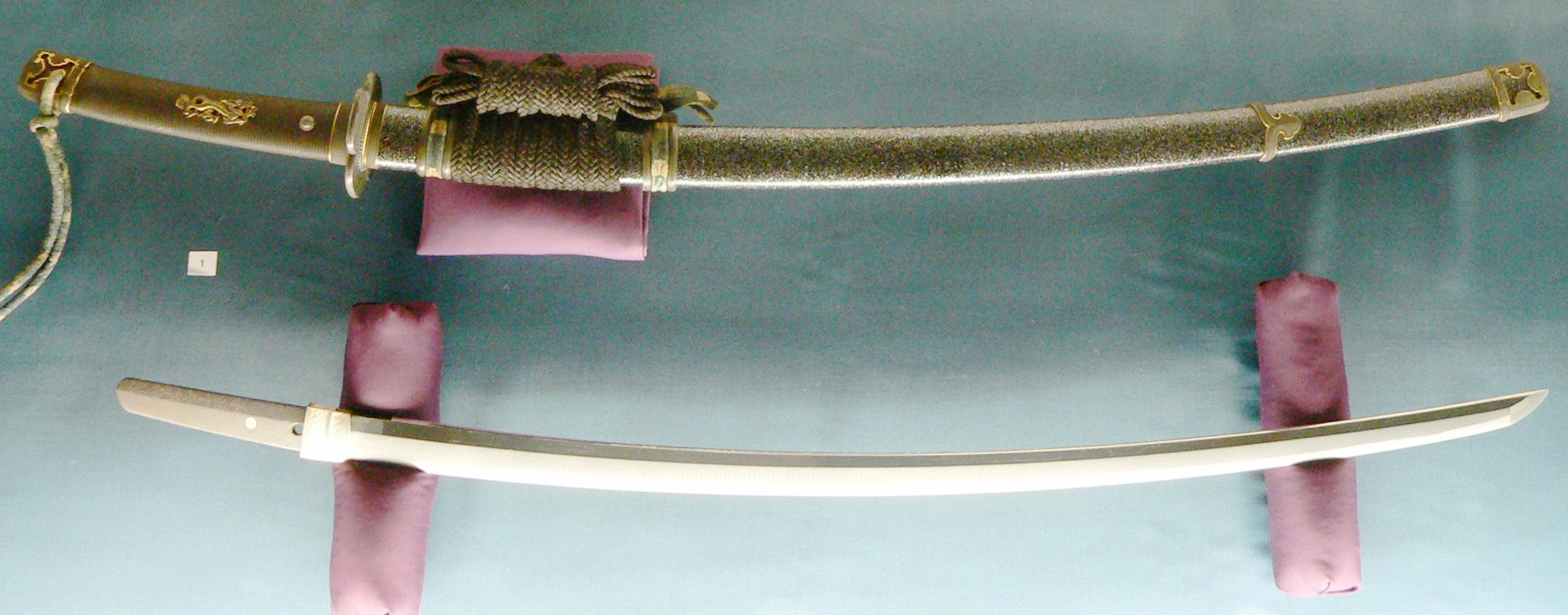
Tachi forged by Bizen Osafune Sukesada, 12th year of the Eishô era, February 1515.

Eishō (永正) was a Japanese era name (年号, nengō; "year name") after Bunki and before Daiei. The period spanned the years from February 1504 through August 1521. The reigning emperor was Go-Kashiwabara-tennō (後柏原天皇).

== Change of era ==
- 1504 Eishō gannen (永正元年): The era name was changed to mark the beginning of a new cycle of the Chinese zodiac. The previous era ended and a new one commenced in Bunki 4, on the 30th day of the 2nd month.

== Events of the Eishō era ==
- 1504 (Eishō 1): A great famine.
- 1505 (Eishō 2): Noda Castle built.
- 1508 (Eishō 5, 1st month): A new revolt in Miyako and the assassination of Hosokawa Masamoto encouraged former-Shōgun Ashikaga Yoshitane in believing that this would be a good opportunity to re-take Heian-kyō. He assembled his troops and marched at their head towards the capital; and by the 6th month of Eishō 5, he was once more in command of the streets of Miyako. Starting in 1508, Yoshitane is known as the Muromachi period's 10th shōgun.
- September 21, 1510 (Eishō 7, 18th day of the 8th month): Earthquake at Seionaikai (Latitude: 34.600/Longitude 135.400), 6.7 magnitude on the Surface wave magnitude scale (M_{s}).
- October 10, 1510 (Eishō 7, 8th day of the 9th month): Earthquake in the Enshunada Sea (Latitude: 34.500/Longitude: 137.600), 7.0 M_{s}.
- 1511 (Eishō 8, 2nd month): priest Yoshida Kanetomo died at the age of 77, which was considered a significant event in the chronicles of the Imperial history of Japan.
- September 16, 1511 (Eishō 8, 24th day of the 8th month): Battle of Funaokayama. Former shōgun Ashikaga Yoshitane returns from Tanba, fearing that Hosokawa Seiken is planning to attack Heian-kyō. Then, with the assistance of Ōuchi Yoshioki, Yoshitane entered the capital.
- 1512 (Eishō 9): Tamanawa Castle built.
- 1513 (Eishō 10, 5th month): Shōgun Ashikaga Yoshiki changes his name to Yoshitane, by which he is better known to historians.

Preceded by Bunki	Era or nengō Eishō; 1504-1521	Succeeded by Daiei
