= Daiei (era) =

Period of Japanese history (1521–1528)

Daiei (大永)

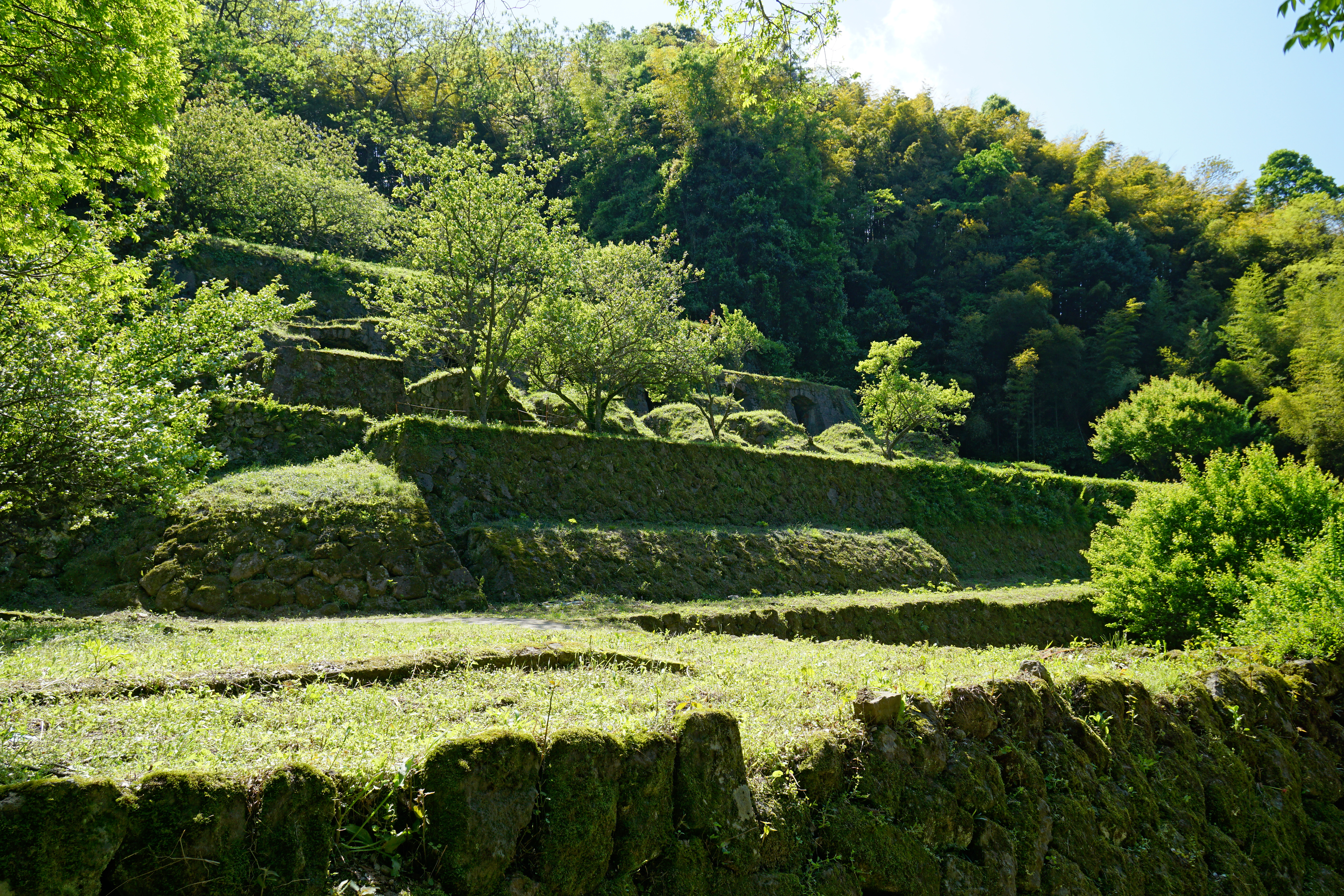
Iwami Ginzan Silver Mine and its Cultural Landscape, UNESCO World Heritage site established in the era

, also known as Taiei or Dai-ei, was a Japanese era name (年号, nengō; "year name") after Eishō and before Kyōroku. This period spanned the years from August 1521 through August 1528. The reigning emperors were Go-Kashiwabara-tennō (後柏原天皇) and Go-Nara-tennō (後奈良天皇).

== Change of era ==
- 1521 Daiei gannen (大永元年): The era name was changed because of the calamities of war and natural disasters. The previous era ended and a new one commenced in Eishō 18, on the 23rd day of the 8th month.

== Events of the Daiei era ==
- January 24, 1525 (Daiei 5, 1st day of the 1st month): All ceremonies in the court were suspended because of the lack of funds to support them.
- April 29, 1525 (Daiei 5, 7th day of the 4th month): Go-Kashiwabara died at the age of 63 years. He had reigned 26 years; that is, his reign lasted 3 years in the nengō Bunki, 17 years in the nengō Eishō, and 6 years in the nengo Daiei. The emperor was found dead in his archives.
- May 25, 1526 (Daiei 6, 14th day of the 4th month): Imagawa Ujichika, Shugo of Suruga Province establishes 33-article Imagawa Family Code (Imagawa Kana List).
- 1526 (Daiei 6, 4th month): Go-Nara was proclaimed emperor upon the death of his father, Emperor Go-Kashiwabara. He began his reign at age 31.
- 1526 (Daiei 6, 7th month): An army from Awa province marched towards Miyako. Hosokawa Takakuni attacked these forces at the Karsouragawa River, but his forces were unsuccessful. Fusokawa Takakage came to the aid of Takakuni, and their combined forces were successful in stopping the advancing army.
- 1526 (Daiei 6, 12th month): Shōgun Ashikaga Yoshiharu invited archers from neighboring provinces to come to the capital for an archery contest.
- 1527 (Daiei 6, 12th month): Large-scale mining operations commenced at the Iwami Ginzan Silver Mine in what is now Shimane Prefecture.

== Notes ==
| Preceded by Eishō | Era or nengō Daiei; 1521–1528 | Succeeded by Kyōroku |
