= Petrus Lotichius Secundus =

German scholar and Neo-Latin poet

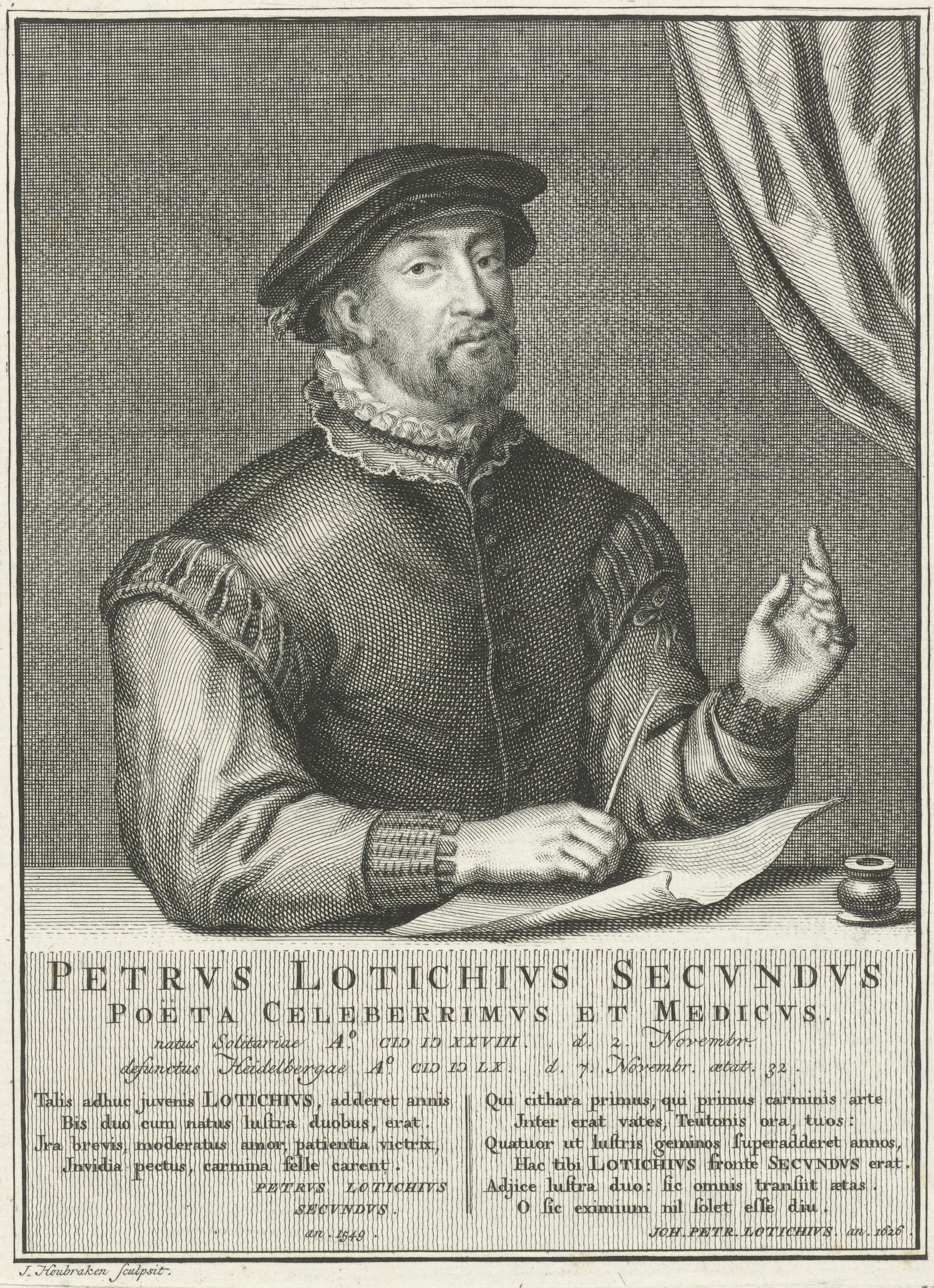
Engraving of Petrus Lotichius Secundus

Petrus Lotichius Secundus or Peter Lotz (2 November 1528 in Niederzell/Schlüchtern – 7 November 1560 in Heidelberg) was a scholar and a significant Neo-Latin poet of the 16th century.

Petrus Lotichius Secundus was born “Peter Lotz” in 1528 in Niederzell, today a district of Schlüchtern (Hesse). In his childhood he attended convent school in Schlüchtern (1535/1537), which was founded by his uncle, the abbot Petrus Lotichius (Peter Lotz). The Frankfurt humanist Jakob Micyllus inspired his interest in Latin poetry. He began his university education in Marburg in 1544, but quickly moved to Leipzig to study with Joachim Camerarius, and from there to Wittenberg to study with Philip Melanchthon. In the winter of 1546/47, he served as a soldier in the Schmalkaldic War on the Protestant side in Magdeburg. He earned his Master of Arts degree in Wittenberg in 1548. He traveled as a companion to the nephew of the Würzburg canon Daniel Stiebar to Paris in 1550/51. Towards the end of 1551 he commenced the study of medicine and botany at the Montpellier which he continued in late 1554 in Padua and later received his doctorate at the University of Bologna in 1556. He was appointed by Elector Otto Henry as professor of medicine and botany at the University of Heidelberg in 1557, where he quickly attracted a circle of young poets around him. He suffered from a reoccurring fever since 1556 and died on 7 November 1560 (possibly as a result of poisoning from his time in Bologna) as one of the most important German poets of his time. He left behind an extensive body of poems based on classical models.

== Works ==
- Elegiarum liber; Carminum libellus. Paris, 1551
- Elegiarum liber secundus; Venator. Lyon, 1553
- Carminum libellus. Bologna, 1556
- Poemata. Leipzig, 1563
- Opera omnia. Leipzig, 1586
- Poemata omnia, ed. Pieter Burmann der Jüngere. Amsterdam, Schouten, 1754. Reprint, New York: Olms (no date)
