= Francisco Pérez de Valenzuela =

Spanish aristocrat (1528–1599)

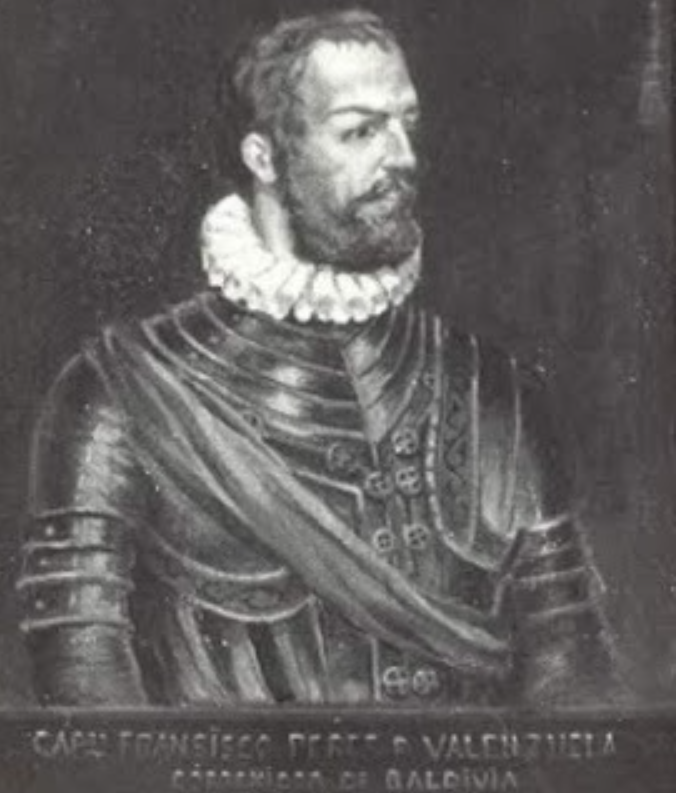
- Born: November 14, 1528; Andújar, Andalusia, Spain
- Died: November 24, 1599 (aged 71); Valdivia, Chile
- Occupations: Soldier; Merchant; Politician
- Known for: Corregidor of Valdivia
- Spouse: Beatriz Buisa de Vaca
- Children: At least 5
- Military career
- Allegiance: Spain
- Conflicts: Arauco War; Destruction of the Seven Cities †

Francisco Pérez de Valenzuela (14 November 1528 in Andújar, Spain – 24 November 1599 in Valdivia, Chile), was a Spanish aristocrat, soldier, and merchant in the Americas. He was killed by Mapuche Indians during the Destruction of the Seven Cities.

Valenzuela was born into an upper-class family, and he was a descendant of King Ferdinand II of León. At a young age in 1539, Valenzuela boarded a ship from Spain to Santo Domingo to go see his father who had already traveled to the Americas. He later moved south to Lima in Peru, where he became a wealthy merchant by importing wine and olive oil. He then moved further south to Chile, where he served as a soldier under General Pedro de Valdivia. He fought many battles against the Mapuches during the Arauco War. During this conflict, Valenzuela often brought ships full of supplies to Chile to support the Spanish war effort. Valenzuela would marry Beatriz de Vaca, a Spanish woman from Ponferrada who had recently arrived in Chile.

Valenzuela would be elected as the Corregidor (Mayor) of Valdivia, a strategically important city in Colonial Chile. As Corregidor, he made great efforts to fortify the city and to prevent pirate attacks. He also owned an encomienda in the city on Teja Island. Valenzuela was killed when the Mapuches attacked and destroyed the city in 1599.
