= 1540s =

Decade

The 1540s decade ran from 1 January 1540, to 31 December 1549.

== Events ==
=== 1540 ===
==== January–March ====
- January 6 – King Henry VIII marries Anne of Cleves, his fourth Queen consort; the marriage lasts six months.
- February 14 – Charles V, Holy Roman Emperor, enters Ghent without resistance, and executes rebels, ending the Revolt of Ghent (1539–1540).
- March 23 – Waltham Abbey is the last to be closed as part of Henry VIII of England's dissolution of the monasteries.

==== April–June ====
- April 3– Estêvão da Gama becomes the new Governor of Portuguese India.
- April 7– The English cathedral priories of Canterbury and Rochester are transformed into secular cathedral chapters on Easter Sunday, concluding the Dissolution of the Monasteries.
- April 12– Printing of the first translation of the New Testament into the Icelandic language is completed after King Christian III of Denmark finishes having Oddur Gottskálksson's text compared to the original Latin.
- May 17 – Battle of Kannauj: Sher Shah Suri defeats and deposes Mughal Emperor Humayan, establishing the Sur Empire.
- June 10 – Thomas Cromwell, Chief Minister for King Henry VIII, is arrested at meeting of the Privy Council of England at Westminster and charged with treason. Cromwell is removed from his positions as Chancellor of the Exchequer, Lord Privy Seal, Lord Great Chamberlain and Governor of the Isle of Wight, and will be executed on July 28.

==== July–September ====
- July 7 – Spanish conquistador Francisco Vázquez de Coronado captures Hawikuh in modern-day New Mexico, at this time known as part of Cíbola, but fails to find the legendary gold.
- July 9 – King Henry VIII of England's marriage to Anne of Cleves, his fourth Queen consort, is annulled.
- July 28 – Thomas Cromwell, is executed for treason on the orders of king Henry VIII of England. Henry marries his fifth wife, Catherine Howard, on the same day.
- August 15 – In Peru, Spanish captain Garcí Manuel de Carbajal founds the Villa Hermosa de Arequipa; one year later, Charles V of Germany and I of Spain will give the valley a status of 'city' by royal decree.
- September 3 – Gelawdewos succeeds his father Lebna Dengel as Emperor of Ethiopia.
- September 10 – Gibraltar is sacked by the fleet of Barbary pirate Ali Hamet, a Sardinian renegade in the service of the Ottoman Empire, and many of its leading citizens are taken as captives to Peñón de Vélez de la Gomera in Morocco. This leads to construction of the defensive Charles V Wall, at this time known as the Muralla de San Benito.
- September 27 – The Society of Jesus (Jesuits) is approved by Pope Paul III, in his bull Regimini militantis Ecclesiae.

==== October–December ====
- October 1 – Battle of Alborán: A Habsburg Spanish fleet, under the command of Bernardino de Mendoza, destroys an Ottoman fleet commanded by Ali Hamet off Alborán Island in the Mediterranean.
- October 18 – An expedition led by Spanish conquistador Hernando de Soto destroys the fortified village of Mabila in modern-day Alabama, killing paramount chief Tuskaloosa.
- November 8 – William Whorwood becomes the new Attorney General for England and Wales, succeeding Sir John Baker
- December 16 – Honoré I, Lord of Monaco reaches the age of 19 and after the future principality of Monaco had been administered by regents for more than 18 years.
- December 20 – Stephen V, Prince of Moldavia, is assassinated by two of the Moldavian nobles (boyars), Mihul and Trotsanul, after word arrives that he will be replaced by Petru IV Rareş, who had paid a bribe to the Ottoman Sultan Suleiman in order to be appointed the new Prince. Alexandru Cornea is crowned temporarily as Prince Alexandru III.
- December 31 – Estêvão da Gama, Governor of Portuguese India, departs from Goa with a plan to sail into the Red Sea, and destroy the Ottoman Empire's access to the Indian Ocean by plundering Suez. The planned attack fails.

==== Date unknown ====
- Europe is hit by a heat wave and drought lasting for about seven months. Rivers such as the Rhine and Seine dry up, and many people die from dysentery and other illnesses, caused by lack of safe drinking water.
- Georg Joachim Rheticus publishes De libris revolutionum Copernici narratio prima in Danzig, an abstract of Copernicus' as yet unpublished De revolutionibus orbium coelestium, and the first printed publication of Copernican heliocentrism.
- Martin Luther expels theologian Caspar Schwenckfeld from Silesia.
- approximate date – The musket is introduced into Japan from Europe.

=== 1541 ===
==== January–March ====
- January 4 – Leonardo Cattaneo della Volta is elected to a two-year term as the new Doge of the Republic of Genoa, succeeding Giannandrea Giustiniani Longo
- February –
- February 8 – (13th day of 1st month of Tenbun 10) In Japan, the Siege of Koriyama, started by Amago Haruhisa of the 30,000 strong Amago clan the previous September in an attack against the Mōri clan led by Mōri Motonari and the Ōuchi clan, ends with a defeat of the attackers. The Amago clan sustains heavy losses, including the death of Amago Hisayuki.
- February 12 – Pedro de Valdivia founds Santiago del Nuevo Extremo, which will become the capital of Chile.
- February 19 – Petru Rareș becomes the Prince of Moldavia for a second time, overthrowing the Voivode Alexandru Cornea at Suceava (now in Romania) at the direction of the Ottoman Sultan Suleiman.
- March 8 – At the Battle of Suakin, fought at an Ottoman port city on the Red Sea in what is now Sudan, Portuguese General Estêvão da Gama and his brother Cristóvão da Gama lead an attack against the Ottoman ruler and plunder the city.
- March 12 – The Portuguese Empire's fortress at Agadir falls to the Moroccan general Mohammed al-Shaykh after a siege of 24 days.
- March 28 – In what is now the capital of Ecuador, San Francisco de Quito is declared a city by the decree of King Charles I of Spain and the Viceroyalty of Peru.

==== April–June ====
- April 7 – Francis Xavier leaves Lisbon, on a mission to the Portuguese East Indies.
- April 24 – Battle of Sahart: Gelawdewos is defeated by the forces of Imam Ahmad ibn Ibrahim al-Ghazi.
- May 8 – Spanish explorer Hernando de Soto reaches the Mississippi River, naming it the Rio de Espiritu Santo ("River of the Holy Spirit").
- May 23 – Jacques Cartier departs from Saint-Malo, France on his third voyage.
- June 13 – The Parliament of Ireland is opened by King Henry VIII for a session that will last for two years.
- June 16 – Şehzade Mustafa, the son of the Ottoman Sultan Suleiman the Magnificent, is appointed as the new Ottoman Governor of the Amasya region of Turkey.
- June 26 – At Lima, Francisco Pizarro, the Spanish conqueror of the Inca Empire of Peru and Governor of Nueva Castilla since 1529, is assassinated by 20 heavily-armed supporters of Diego de Almagro II in retaliation for the 1538 execution of Diego de Almagro.

==== July–September ====
- July 7 &ndash (Tenbun 10, 14th day of the 6th month) Takeda Shingen becomes head of Japan's powerful Takeda clan of samurais that rules the Kai Province, overthrowing and banishing his father, Takeda Nobutora. Nobutora is exiled to Suruga Province for the next 32 years.
- July 9 – Estêvão da Gama departs Massawa, leaving behind 400 matchlock men and 150 slaves under his brother Cristóvão da Gama, with orders to assist the Emperor of Ethiopia to defeat Ahmad ibn Ibrahim al-Ghazi, who had invaded his Empire.
- August 21 – The Janissaries of Suleiman the Magnificent besiege Buda, wounding Wilhelm von Roggendorf, who dies from his wounds on the way to Komárno a few days later.
- September 9–11 – Spanish noblewoman Beatriz de la Cueva serves as governor of the colony of Guatemala, before she is killed in a mudslide from Volcán de Agua, which ruins the capital city, Ciudad Vieja.
- September 13 – After three years of exile, John Calvin returns to Geneva to reform the church under a body of doctrine that comes to be known as Calvinism.
- September 28 – King Charles of Spain begins the disastrous campaign against the Regency of Algiers as he assembles a fleet of 500 ships, with 24,000 soldiers, at the Spanish island of Majorca and prepares to cross the Mediterranean with the fleets of allied nations led by the Admiral Andrea Doria of the Republic of Genoa.

==== October–December ====
- October 7 – Through royal decree, the city of Arequipa is granted its coat of arms.
- October 24 – Algiers Expedition: One day after thousands of Spanish, German and Italian soldiers arrived on the North African coast and proceeded to surround the city of Algiers, heavy storms begin and the Algerian defenders surround King Charles and the other commanders. Fifteen European ships are wrecked onshore, and 33 others sink. Over the next 30 days, the Europeans are forced to retreat.
- November 1 – King Henry VIII of England is first informed of that the Queen consort, Catherine Howard, has been having an affair with Thomas Culpeper.
- November 19 – (1st waxing of Tazaungmon 903 ME) King Tabinshwehti of Burma, having concluded the Buddhist Lent, leads the attack on the Kingdom of Prome with 17,000 troops and 1,400 boats.
- November 23 –
  - Catherine Howard, the Queen consort of England, is arrested after 16 days of questioning by Thomas Cranmer, the Archbishop of Canterbury, reveals that she had also been conducting an adulterous affair with Francis Dereham while married to King Henry VIII. She is imprisoned at Syon Abbey in Middlesex near London.
  - Charles V, Holy Roman Emperor, who also serves as King Carlos I of Spain, is finally able to depart from Algiers and abandons his army.
- December 3 – The Holy Roman Emperor Charles V is finally able to return to Spain, arriving at Cartagena
- December 10 – Thomas Culpeper and Francis Dereham are both executed at Tyburn after being convicted of treason in committing adultery with Queen Catherine. Culpeper is beheaded, while Dereham is hanged, drawn and quartered. As a warning to the public, the severed heads of both men are placed on spikes on the London Bridge.

==== Date unknown ====
- Ottoman Sultan Suleiman the Magnificent seals off The Golden Gate in Jerusalem, likely because of a prophecy that the Messiah would return through this gate to Jerusalem.
- Iceland adopts the Lutheran faith.
- Gerardus Mercator makes his first globe.
- The first official translation of the entire Bible into Swedish is made, and is called the Gustav Vasa Bible.
- John Calvin translates his Institutio Christianae religionis into French, as L'Institution chrétienne.
- Elia Levita's chivalric romance, the Bovo-Bukh, is first printed, the earliest published secular work in Yiddish.

=== 1542 ===
==== January–March ====
- January 6 – In the Yucatan peninsula in Mexico, the Spanish colonists create the new town of Mérida.
- January 16 – The 8th Parliament of Henry VIII assembles at Westminster after having been summoned on November 23.
- January 20 – The first legislature for the Voivode of Transylvania meets at Vásárhely in the Kingdom of Hungary (now Târgu Mureș in Romania).
- January 23 – Tutul-Xiu, the Mayan ruler of the Maní in Yucatán, arrives at the Spanish settlement of Merida with food supplies for the colonists and offers to assist the Spaniards in their conquest of Yucatan in return for being installed as the leading Mayan ruler in Mexico.
- February 2 – Battle of Baçente: The Portuguese under Cristóvão da Gama capture a Muslim-occupied hillfort in northern Ethiopia.
- February 13 – Catherine Howard, until recently the Queen consort of England and the wife of King Henry VIII, is executed by beheading, two days after the King gives royal assent to a bill of attainder passed by the English Parliament on February 7. Catherine had been arrested in November on accusations that she had sexual relations with Thomas Culpeper.
- February 14 – Guadalajara, Mexico, is founded by the Spaniards after three previous attempts failed, due to aggressive opposition from local tribes.
- February 15 – Antoine Escalin des Aimars of France completes the negotiation with the Ottoman Sultan Suleiman for the Franco-Ottoman alliance.
- March 8 – Antoine Escalin des Eymars, the French ambassador, returns from Constantinople, with promises of Ottoman aid in a war against Charles V, Holy Roman Emperor.

==== April–June ====
- April 1 – As the 1542 session of the English Parliament ends, King Henry VIII gives royal assent to numerous laws, including the Witchcraft Act, the Treason Act, and the Leases by Corporations Act.
- April 4 – The Battle of Jarte begins in Ethiopia as the Army of the Portuguese Empire, commanded by Cristóvão da Gama encounters the army of the Ethiopian ruler, the Imam Ahmad Gragn, achieving a victory on April 16.
- May 19 – The Prome Kingdom, in modern-day central Burma, is conquered by the Taungoo Dynasty.
- June 18 – The Parliament of Ireland passes the Crown of Ireland Act, which dissolves the title of Lord of Ireland and reestablishes it to the Kingdom of Ireland, with its last Lord, Henry VIII of England, becoming its first king.
- June 27 – Juan Rodriguez Cabrillo sets sail to explore the northwest of the Pacific Ocean.

==== July–September ====
- July 21 – Pope Paul III establishes the Holy Office with the bull Licet ab initio, with jurisdiction over the Roman Inquisition.
- July 23 – (10th day of 6th month of Tenbun 11) In Japan, a six-year rebellion within the Date clan when clan leader Date Tanemune, returning home from a day of falconry, is attacked by his oldest son, Date Harumune, and imprisoned at Kōri-Nishiyama Castle in Fukushima Prefecture. Tanemune is rescued by an aide, Koyanagigawa Munetomo, and escapes. The war lasts for six years before Harumune triumphs and becomes the new leader of the Date clan.
- July 24 – Guelders Wars: Maarten van Rossum leaves Antwerp, having failed to take it by siege.
- August 24 – Battle of Haddon Rig: Scotland defeats England.
- August 27 – Citizens of Hildesheim in the Holy Roman Empire profess themselves to the Lutheran teachings, thus joining the Schmalkaldic League. As a pledge owner, the city provides for the carrying out of the Protestant Reformation in the city and Peine. Priests from the localities of Clauen, Hohenhameln, Soßmar, Schmedenstedt, Lengede and Rosenthal resume their offices in the interest of the Reformation.
- August 28 – Battle of Wofla in Ethiopia: Reinforced with at least 2900 arquebusiers and cavalry, the Imam Ahmad Gragn attacks the Portuguese camp. The Portuguese are scattered; Cristóvão da Gama is captured and executed.
- September 4 – The earliest recorded Preston Guild Court is held in Lancashire, England, in the modern sequence, which lasts unbroken until 1922.
- September 28 – Juan Rodríguez Cabrillo lands in what is now San Diego Bay, and names it "San Miguel", claiming it for the Spanish Empire. San Miguel will later become the city of San Diego. This marks the first time a European sees what is now the U.S. state of California.

==== October–December ====
- October 7 – Cabrillo becomes the first European to set foot on California's Santa Catalina Island.
- November 9 – King James V of Scotland writes a letter to Pope Paul III and notes that he defied Henry VIII's attempts to convert him to the Protestant faith.
- November 24 – Battle of Solway Moss: An English army invades Scotland, and defeats a Scottish army.
- November 27 – Palace plot of Renyin year: A group of Ming dynasty palace women fail to murder the Jiajing Emperor, and are executed by slow-slicing.
- December 14 – Mary, Queen of Scots, aged six days, becomes queen regnant on the death of her father, James V of Scotland.

==== Date unknown ====
- The first contact of Japan with the West occurs when a Portuguese ship, blown off its course to China, lands Antonio Pexoto, Francisco Zeimoto and António Mota in Japan, according to António Galvão. According to the Japanese books Tanegashima Kafu and Teppoki, it is stated they landed in 1543.
- Bartolomé de las Casas completes A Short Account of the Destruction of the Indies, which will be published in 1552.

=== 1543 ===
==== January–March ====
- January 4 – Andrea Centurione Pietrasanta begins a two-year term as the new Doge of the Republic of Genoa, replacing Leonardo Cattaneo della Volta.
- January 8 – The burial of King James V of Scotland is carried out at Holyrood Abbey.
- February 11 – King Henry VIII of England allies with Charles V, Holy Roman Emperor, against France.
- February 21 – Battle of Wayna Daga: A joint Ethiopian-Portuguese force of 8,500, under Emperor Gelawdewos of Ethiopia, defeats Imam Ahmad ibn Ibrahim al-Ghazi's army of over 14,000, ending the Ethiopian–Adal war.
- March 7 –
  - Abu Abdallah Muhammad VI is installed as the new ruler of the Kingdom of Tlemcen in what is now Algeria, succeeding his brother Abu Zayyan III.
  - Massive flooding of the Mississippi River and the Arkansas River begins in southeastern North America over a 40 day period while Spanish explorer Hernando DeSoto and his team are passing through. The event is noted by the chronicler of the DeSoto Expedition, Inca Garcilaso de la Vega.
- March 15 – James Hamilton, 2nd Earl of Arran, is elected by the Scottish Parliament as the Regent for the infant Mary Queen of Scots.
- March 18 – As flooding of the Mississippi continues De la Vega notes that "on the eighteenth of March, 1543, while the Spaniards.. were making a procession in honor of Our Redeemer's entrance into Jerusalem, the river entered the gates of the little village of Aminoya in the wildness and fury of its flood, and two days later on ecould not pass through the streets except in canoes."
- March 20 – King Gustav of Sweden leads troops in troops crushing Dacke's Rebellion, led by Swedish peasant Nils Dacke, with defeat coming at the Battle of Hjortensjon.
- March 21 – In Nuremberg, De revolutionibus orbium coelestium (On the Revolutions of the Heavenly Spheres) is printed during the illness of Nicholas Copernicus, offering mathematical arguments for the existence of the heliocentric universe, denying the geocentric model. According to legend, Copernicus, who had a stroke in December, is presented a copy of the book on his deathbed shortly before passing away on May 24 in Frombork at the age of 70.

==== April–June ====
- April 23 – Suleiman the Magnificent, Sultan of the Ottoman Empire, follows up on his 1541 annexation of Hungary by invading a second time to capture areas that had been taken by Archduke Ferdinand, including Esztergom.
- May 5 – Elizabeth of Austria, daughter of Archduke Ferdinand I, marries Sigismund II Augustus, King of Poland. Her coronation as coronation as Queen consort of Poland takes place three days later at Kraków Cathedral as the Archbishop of Gniezno, Piotr Gamrat, places the crown of Hedwig of Kalisz upon her head.
- May 12 –
  - King Henry VIII of England gives royal assent to numerous laws passed by parliament, including the Act for the Advancement of True Religion, restricting the reading of the Bible to clerics, noblemen, and upper class society. The Act will be repealed in 1547 during the reign of King Edward VI.
  - Laws in Wales Act 1542, second phase of the Consolidating Act of Welsh Union, is given royal assent, establishing counties and regularizing parliamentary representation in Wales.
- May 24 – On his deathbed, Nicolaus Copernicus is presented a copy of his groundbreaking book De revolutionibus orbium coelestium.
- June 4 – Fabiano di Monte San Savinov leads 500 infantry men and some cavalry in an attempt to conquer the Republic of San Marino, but the group fails after getting lost in a dense fog on Saint Quirinus' Day.
- June 22 – King Henry VIII of England declares war on King Francis I of France, one month after sending an ultimatum.
- June – Andreas Vesalius publishes De humani corporis fabrica (On the Fabric of the Human Body), revolutionising the science of human anatomy.

==== July–September ====
- July 1 – The Treaty of Greenwich is signed between representatives of the Kingdoms of England and Scotland as part of a plan to eventually unify the two nations under one monarch. As part of the treaty, the two nations agree to avoid war during the reign of King Henry VIII in England or Mary, Queen of Scots in Scotland and for another year after both are gone. The second part of the Treaty provides that Mary, Queen of Scots (six months old at the time) will eventually become the wife of Crown Prince Edward (then 5 years old), son of King Henry VIII. The Scottish Parliament repudiates the treaty five months later.
- July 12 – King Henry VIII of England marries Catherine Parr. It is Henry's sixth and last marriage and Catherine's third. Princess Elizabeth attends the wedding. This month, the Parliament of England passes the Third Succession Act, restoring the Princesses Mary and Elizabeth I of England, Henry's daughters, to the line of succession to the English throne.
- July 25–
  - The first large naval battle in the Atlantic Ocean, the Battle of Muros Bay, takes place off of the coast of Galicia in Spain between the French fleet and the Spanish fleet. Although France has the larger force, the Spanish Admiral Álvaro de Bazán identifies the flagship of French Admiral Jean de Clamorgan and sinks the vessel. Spain then captures the remaining 23 other ships and takes 3,000 prisoners, while France loses 3,000 dead and injured.
  - Suleiman the Magnificent, the Ottoman Sultan, begins the siege of the city of Esztergom in Hungary.
- August 6– The Siege of Nice by the Ottoman Empire and French forces (under the Franco-Ottoman alliance), led by Admiral Hayreddin Barbarossa, begins. At the time, the city is under the control of the Duchy of Savoy and is defended by the Savoyards, assisted by the Habsburg armies of Spain and the Holy Roman Empire. The siege lasts for 16 days.
- August 10 – Esztergom surrenders to the Ottomans led by Suleiman the Magnificent.
- August 22 – The city of Nice is captured by the Ottomans and Barbarossa after a long bombardment. The Ottomans pillage the city and take away 2,500 captives to be sold into slavery.
- August 25 – (24th day of 7th month of Tenbun 12) The first Europeans arrive in Japan and introduce firearms to the Asian monarchy, as the Chinese pirate Wang Zhi escorts Portuguese traders to in Tanegashima island in southern Kyushu. The first European visitors include António Mota, António Peixoto, Francisco Zeimoto, and Fernão Mendes Pinto.
- September 4 – Campaign of Suleiman: Suleiman the Magnificent captures the Hungarian coronation city of Székesfehérvár after a siege that had started on August 20. The city will be occupied by the Ottoman Empire for 145 years.
- September 9 – Mary Stuart is crowned the Queen of Scots in Stirling at the age of nine months old.
- September–October – Landrecies in Picardy is besieged by forces under Charles V, Holy Roman Emperor, but the siege is withdrawn on the approach of the French army.

==== October–December ====
- October 6 – In order to aid James Hamilton, Earl of Arran, Regent of Scotland, in his defense against challenger Matthew Stewart, 4th Earl of Lennox, King Francois of France arranges for two envoys, Jacques de La Brosse and Jacques Ménage to deliver money and munitions to Dumbarton Castle. The envoys unwittingly deliver Arran's materials to Lennox.
- November 16 – Suleiman, Sultan of the Ottoman Empire, completes his campaign to bring Hungary under Ottoman rule, having captured Esztergom, Székesfehérvár, Siklós and Szeged
- December 7 – (11 waxing of Natdaw 905 ME) The land and naval forces of the Confederation of Shan States (consisting of the principalities of Mohnyin, Mogaung, Bhamo, Momeik, and Kale), led by Prince Sawlon of Mohnyin and King Hkonmaing, depart from the Shan capital, Awa, to start an invasion of the Toungoo Empire in upper Myanmar. The invaders easily overrun Toungoo and its capital at Prome a week later. Royal Historical Commission of Burma (1832). Hmannan Yazawin (in Burmese). Vol. 1 (2003 ed.). Yangon: Ministry of Information, Myanmar.
- December 11 – The Parliament of Scotland votes against ratifying the Treaty of Greenwich that had been signed with England on July 1.
- December 20 – The Eight Years War, also called the "War of Rough Wooing", begins as Scotland's Parliament votes to declare war on the Kingdom of England. "Arran, Earls of", in Encyclopædia Britannica, ed. by Hugh Chisholm (11th ed., Volume 2) (Cambridge University Press, 1911) pp. 642–644.
- December 31 – King Henry VIII of England signs and agreement with Charles V, Holy Roman Emperor to invade France by June 20, 1544 with at least 35,000 infantry and 7,000 cavalry.

==== Date unknown ====
- Martin Luther publishes On the Jews and Their Lies.
- Mikael Agricola publishes Abckiria.
- The Lighthouse of Genoa is completed in present form.
- Indians in the Spanish Empire are declared free, against the wishes of local settlers.

=== 1544 ===
==== January–March ====
- January 4 – In India, Maldeo Rathore, King of Marwar (now part of the state of Rajasthan) is tricked by counterintelligence spread by Mughal Emperor and Afghan Shah Sher Shah Suri into departing from Jodhpur. The Battle of Sammel begins shortly afterward and is won by the Afghan and Mughal armies.
- January 13 – At Västerås, the estates of Sweden swear loyalty to King Gustav Vasa and to his heirs, ending the traditional electoral monarchy in Sweden. Gustav subsequently signs an alliance with the Kingdom of France.
- January 24 – During a solar eclipse visible over the Netherlands, Dutch mathematician and designer Gemma Frisius makes the first recorded use of a camera obscura and uses it to observe the event without directly looking at the Sun. Frisius writes about the event the next year and illustrates it in his book De Radio Astronomica et Geometrica (Regarding rays of light in astronomy and geometry).
- February 20 – The Fourth Diet of Speyer is convened.
- March 7 – Five Roman Catholic priests— John Larke, John Ireland, the vicar of Eltham and Robert Singleton are executed at Tyburn, outside of London, in England after being convicted of participating in the Prebendaries' Plot to remove Thomas Cranmer, the Protestant Archbishop of Canterbury.
- March 16 –
  - The Battle of Glasgow is fought for control of Scotland between Matthew Stewart, 4th Earl of Lennox and the troops of the Regent, James Hamilton, 2nd Earl of Arran
  - Friedrich II becomes the new Elector Palatine of Germany's Rhineland within the Holy Roman Empire upon the death of his brother Ludwig V at Heidelberg.
- March 29 – Royal assent is given by King Henry VIII to laws passed by the English Parliament, including the Third Succession Act, the amended Treason Act and the King's Style Act.

==== April–June ====
- April 11 – Battle of Ceresole: French forces under the Comte d'Enghien defeat forces of the Holy Roman Empire, under the Marques Del Vasto, near Turin.
- April 21 – The Italian town of Agropoli, frequently targeted by pirates from North Africa, is sacked by Ottoman raiders and 100 people are taken prisoner.
- May 3 – Edward Seymour, Earl of Hertford, with an English army, captures Leith and Edinburgh from the Kingdom of Scotland.
- May 7 – Edward Seymour, Lord Hertford, carries out the burning of Edinburgh, capital of the Kingdom of Scotland, by the English Navy, then proceeds to destroy neighboring areas.
- May 17 – At Lima, Blasco Núñez Vela takes office as the first Spanish Governor of the Viceroyalty of Peru, which encompasses most of what are now the nations of Peru, Ecuador, Bolivia, Paraguay and Uruguay, as well as the western part of Brazil.
- May 23 –
  - The Treaty of Speyer is signed between the Holy Roman Empire and the Kingdom of Denmark (which includes Norway). Charles V, Holy Roman Emperor agrees to recognize Christian III as the ruler of Denmark and Norway, and abandons further attempts to restore King Christian II to the throne. In return, Denmark and Norway agree to support the Habsburg monarchy in the Empire.
  - The allied French and Ottoman navies depart from the French port of Marseille and travel to Constantinople, the Ottoman capital. The French fleet is commanded by Antoine Escalin des Aimars, known as Captain Polin, French ambassador to the Ottomans, while the Turks are led by Hayreddin Barbarossa.
- May 25 – On orders of King Henry VIII, the English Navy, commanded by Thomas Howard, 3rd Duke of Norfolk, begins crossing the English Channel to invade from the west with 19,000 troops, while Charles V, Holy Roman Emperor, commences an invasion of France from the east.
- June 4 – A combined force of troops from the Holy Roman Empire and from Spain, both commanded by Emperor Charles V, defeat the French in the Battle of Serravalle after three days of fighting.
- June 8 – The Duke of Norfolk crosses the English Channel after having landed troops in Normandy.
- June 24 – The plundering of the Italian island of Ischia, part of the Kingdom of Naples is carried out by the Ottoman Empire Navy, commanded by Hayreddin Barbarossa, who captures 4,000 of the residents and then sells them as slaves in Algeria.

==== July–September ====
- July 10– Troops of the Holy Roman Empire begin the six-week siege of Saint-Dizier in eastern France.
- July 15 – Battle of the Shirts: The Clan Fraser of Lovat and Macdonalds of Clan Ranald fight over a disputed chiefship in Scotland; reportedly, five Frasers and eight or ten Macdonalds survive.
- July 19– Italian War of 1542–46: King Henry VIII of England begins the siege of the city of Boulogne in northern France and continues for almost two months before the city surrenders.
- July 20 – Albert, Duke of Prussia signs a deed granting land for creation of the University of Königsberg.
- August 17 –
  - The University of Königsberg is inaugurated in Prussia.
  - In France, Saint-Dizier surrenders to the Holy Roman Empire after a siege of more than a month.
- September 14 – The siege of Boulogne ends as the city surrenders to King Henry VIII.
- September 18
  - Peace of Crépy: Peace is declared between Charles V, Holy Roman Emperor, and Francis I of France. The war between France and England continues.
  - The expedition of Juan Bautista Pastene makes landfall in San Pedro Bay, southern Chile, claiming the territory for Spain.
- September 22 – Captain Juan Bautista Pastene leads the first European expedition to the estuary of Valdivia, Chile and Corral Bay.

==== October–December ====
- October 9 – Second Siege of Boulogne: French forces under the Dauphin assault Boulogne, but are ultimately unsuccessful.
- November 24 – Rüstem Opuković Pasha, son-in-law of the Sultan Suleiman the Magnificent, is appointed as the new Grand Vizier of the Ottoman Empire, replacing Hadım Suleiman Pasha.
- December 9 – Crown Prince Yi Ho becomes the new King of Korea upon the death of his father, King Joseon. Yi Ho reigns for eight months before being poisoned by his own mother, and is posthumously named as King Injong of Joseon.

==== Date unknown ====
- Mongols, led by Anda, burn the suburbs of Peking in China.
- After being asked by Cosimo I de' Medici, Grand Duke of Tuscany, botanist Luca Ghini comes to the University of Pisa as the chair of botany, where he had the year prior established the Orto botanico di Pisa.
- Rats make their first appearance in South America, arriving in Peru with the species black rat.
- Portuguese explorers encounter the island of Taiwan, and call it Ilha Formosa ("Beautiful Island").

=== 1545 ===
==== January–March ====
- January 1 – King Francis I of France issues the "Arrêt de Mérindol", to destroy the Protestant Waldensians of Provence.
- January 4 – Giovanni Battista De Fornari begins a 2-year term as the Doge of Genoa, succeeding Andrea Centurione Pietrasanta.
- February 22 – A firman of the Ottoman Empire is issued for the dethronement of Radu Paisie as Prince of Wallachia.
- February 27 – Battle of Ancrum Moor: The Scots are victorious over numerically superior English forces.
- March 17 – Mircea the Shepherd enters Bucharest as the new ruler of Wallachia, now in Romania.
- March 24 – At a diet in Worms, Germany, summoned by Pope Paul III, the German Protestant princes demand a national religious settlement for Germany. Holy Roman Emperor, Charles V refuses.

==== April–June ====
- April 1 – Potosí is founded by the Spanish as a mining town after the discovery of huge silver deposits in this area of modern-day Bolivia. Silver mined from Huayna Potosí Mountain provides most of the wealth on which the Spanish Empire is based until its fall in the early 19th century.
- May 20 –
  - Sher Shah Suri, King of the Sur Empire in northern India, is fatally injured by an explosion from one of his own cannons while leading the siege of the Kalinjar Fort and dies two days later.
  - In Vietnam, warlord Nguyễn Kim of the Lê dynasty leads troops toward an attack on Ninh Binh when he is invited by Dương Chấp Nhất of the Mạc dynasty to dinner. General Kim is treated to a watermelon by Duong and dies the next day.
- May 27 – Prince Jalal Khan, the second son of the late Sher Shah Suri, is crowned as the new King of the Suri Empire and takes the regnal name of Islam Shah Suri.
- May 31 – During the Italian War, a French expeditionary force under the direction of Claude d'Annebault begins an invasion of Britain by landing in Scotland.
- June 13 – Spanish explorer Yñigo Ortiz de Retez sets out to navigate the northern coast of New Guinea.
- June 20 – Spanish explorer Yñigo Ortiz de Retez arrives at a large island in the South Pacific Ocean. Stopping at the Mamberamo River, Ortiz claims the island for Spain and christens it "Nueva Guinea" after concluding that the natives resemble the people on the coast of the Guinea coast of West Africa.

==== July–September ====
- July 18– The Battle of the Solent begins between the English and French navies in The Solent, the strait between the British mainland and the Isle of Wight.
- July 19 – The Royal Navy's flagship, the Mary Rose, is sunk along with 365 of its 400 crew before the Battle of the Solent ends inconclusively. The wreckage will be located in 1971, more than 400 years after the sinking, and raised on October 11, 1982.
- July 21 – Italian Wars: Battle of Bonchurch – The English reverse an attempted French invasion of the Isle of Wight, off the coast of England.
- August 5 – Scottish nobleman Domhnall Dubh, also called "Black Donald", secures an alliance with King Henry VIII of England and plans an invasion of Scotland (Dubh's Rebellion) seeking to install the Earl of Lennox as the regent for Mary, Queen of Scots, rather than the incumbent Regent Arran. The rebellion attracts little support from other nobles and Dubh dies of a fever while in Ireland, before an invasion can take place.
- August 8 – King Injong of Joseon, ruler of the Korean Empire, dies at the age of 30, after only eight months as monarch. His allies suspect that he had slowly been poisoned by his stepmother, Queen Janggyeong, who had been Queen consort as the wife of King Jungjong. Queen Janggyeong's 12-year-old son Myeongjong is enthroned as the new King, with Janggyeong as the regent.

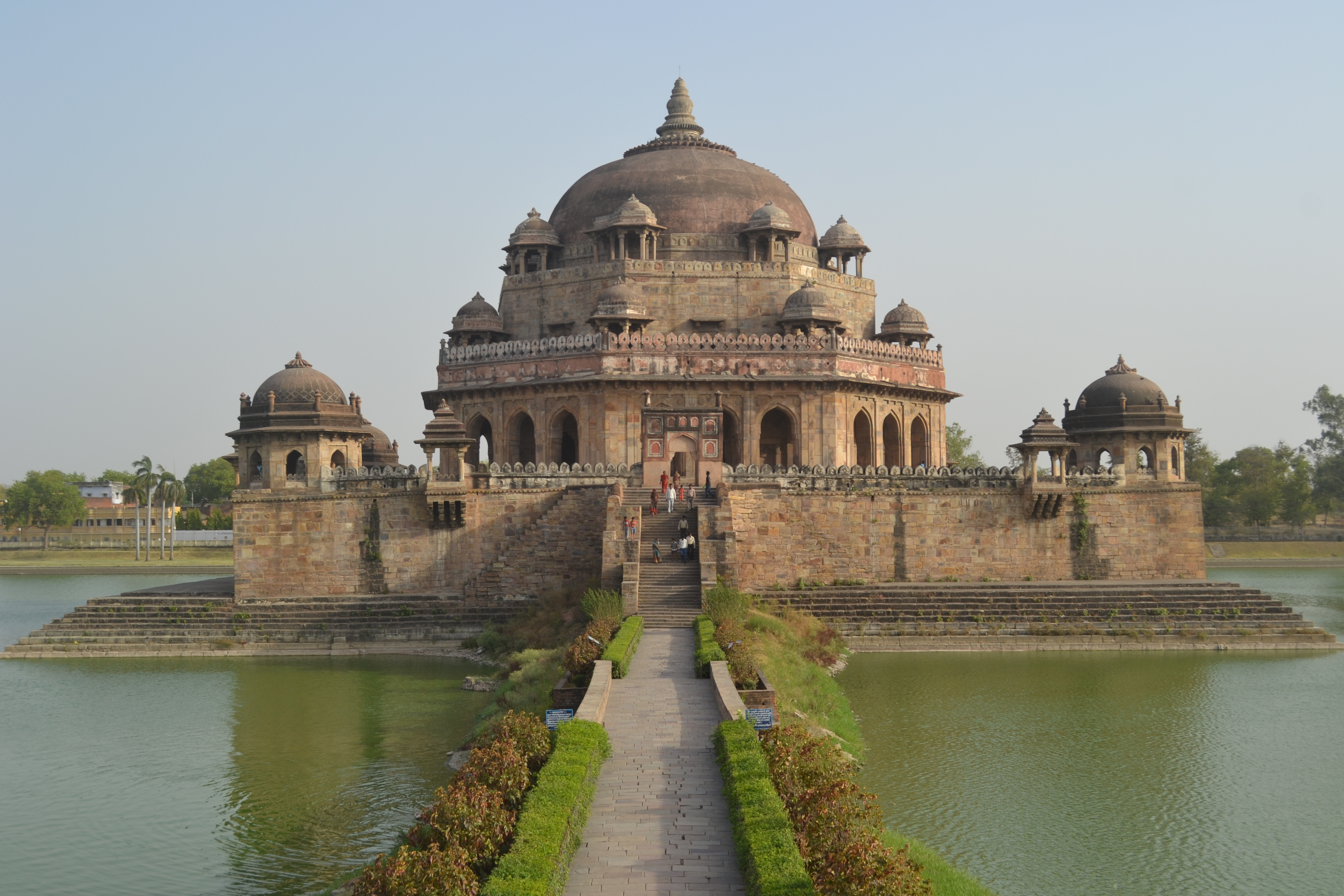
Sher Shah's tomb

- August 16 – The elaborate Tomb of Sher Shah Suri is completed in Sasaram, three months after Sher Shah's death, in what is now India's Bihar state.
- September 16 –
  - The Duchy of Parma and Piacenza is created in Italy by order of Pope Paul III, formerly Alessandro Farnese, to be ruled by his son, Pier Luigi Farnese.
  - In a one-day campaign in the Rough Wooing border war between England and Scotland, the English generals Lord Hertford and Robert Bowes carry out a mission of burning Scottish towns along the River Teviot. He writes later that with 1,500 light horsemen from 5:00 in the morning to 3:00 in the afternoon, his army "burnt 14 or 15 towns" including "Rowle, Spittel, Bedrowle, Rowlewood, The Wolles, Crossebewghe, Donnerles, Fotton, West Leas, Troonyhill, and Dupligi.
- c. September – Mobye Narapati succeeds as ruler of the Ava Kingdom and offers peace to the Taungoo dynasty, ending the Taungoo–Ava War (1538–45), and leaving the Taungoo as the dominant rulers in Burma.

==== October–December ====
- October 20 – The "New Laws"(Leyes Nuevas), officially the New Laws of the Indies for the Good Treatment and Preservation of the Indians are repealed less than a year after being issued by King Carlos of Spain.
- October 31 – (26th day of 9th month of Tenbun 14) The Siege of Kawagoe Castle begins, as part of an unsuccessful attempt by the Uesugi clan to regain Kawagoe Castle from the Late Hōjō clan in Japan.
- November 9 – Pietro Lando, the Doge of the Republic of Venice since 1538, dies and Francesco Donato is elected in his place.
- November 10 – A truce is signed between the Holy Roman Empire and the Ottoman Empire following the Siege of Nice, as Emperor Charles V acknowedges the Ottoman conquests.
- November 15 – (10 Ramadan 952 AH) Hamida Banu Begum, Empress consort of India's Mughal Empire and wife of the Emperor Humayun, returns to the capital, Agra, after a three-year absence. She is accompanied by an army provided to Humayun by Tahmasp I, Shah of Iran.
- November 23 – King Henry VIII opens the Parliament of England for the ninth time, in a session that lasts until December 24.
- December 13 – The Council of Trent officially opens in northern Italy (it closes in 1563).
- December 24 – King Henry VIII gives royal assent to multiple acts passed by the English Parliament on its final day, including the Dissolution of Colleges Act and the Custos Rotulorum Act.

==== Undated ====
- Battle of Sokhoista: The army of the Ottoman Empire defeats an alliance of Georgian dynasties.
- Diogo I Nkumbi a Mpudi overthrows his uncle Pedro I of Kongo to become manikongo.
- In China, a large failure of the harvest in Henan province occurs due to excessive rainfall, which drives up the price of wheat, and forces many to flee their rural counties; those who stay behind are forced to survive by eating leaves, bark, and human flesh.
- In the territory of New Spain in modern-day Mexico, the Cocoliztli Epidemic of 1545–1548 begins.
- St. Anne's Church, Augsburg converts to Lutheranism.

=== 1546 ===
==== January–March ====
- January 11 – (Tenbun 15, 20th day of the 12th month): Ashikaga Yoshifushi becomes 13th Shōgun of the Ashikaga shogunate.
- January 13 – Jeremias I of Constantinople, Patriarch of the Eastern Orthodox Church dies
- January 18 – Blasco Núñez Vela first Spanish Viceroy of Peru fights with Gonzalo Pizarro at the Battle of Iñaquito and is killed.
- February 12 – The Roman Catholic Archdiocese of Mexico, one of the largest in the world, with over four million Catholics, is created
- February 15 – Martin Luther delivers his final sermon, three days before his death about "obdurate Jews, whom it was a matter of great urgency to expel from all German territory,"
- March 1 – Scottish Protestant reformer George Wishart, arrested on January 19, is burned at the stake at St Andrews on orders of Cardinal David Beaton of the Roman Catholic church, after being found guilty of heresy. Cardinal Beaton is assassinated less than three months later.
- March 8 – King John III of Portugal issues an order for Portuguese India (at Goa) to forbid Hinduism, destroy Hindu temples, prohibit the public celebration of Hindu feasts, expel Hindu priests and severely punish those who created any Hindu images in Portuguese possessions in India.

==== April–June ====
- April 8 – The Council of Trent, by a vote of 24 to 15, with 16 abstentions, issues the Decretum de Canonicis Scripturis for the scripture considered to be canon by the Roman Catholic Church. The decree recites that if anyone declines to receive all parts of the Vulgate edition of the Bible, they are in contempt of the Church and should be excommunicated. and approves the 4th century Vulgate of Jerome as its official Bible
- April 13 – Alice Glaston, age 11, becomes the youngest girl ever to be legally executed in England (though John Dean, age 8, is executed on February 23, 1629)
- April 17 – Dionysius II, the Eastern Orthodox Metropolitan of Nicomedia, is elected as the Patriarch of Constantinople to succeed Jeremias.
- April 18 – Hermann of Wied, the German Archbishop of Cologne, is excommunicated by Pope Paul III after his conversion to Protestantism.
- April 20 – The Siege of Diu begins as the Gujarat Sultanate, led by Mahmud Shah III attacks the Portuguese colonial fortress at Diu. Reinforcements arrive on July 19 and Governor Castro arrives with 3,000 soldiers on November 7. The keeper of the King's Ports and Galley siege lasts until November 10 and ends with a Portuguese victory
- April 24 – The first government body to administer England's Royal Navy, the Keeper of the King's Ports and Galleys, is created by order of King Henry VIII.
- May 1 – Sir John Alan is dismissed from his post as Lord Chancellor of Ireland by England's Privy Council after accusations of corruption and promoting discord are made by the Lord Deputy, Anthony St Leger. Alan is later reinstated in 1548.
- May 16 – Writing from Portuguese India, Jesuit missionary Francis Xavier asks King João III of Portugal, proposing what will become the Goa Inquisition of 1561.
- May 19 – The Siege of Kawagoe Castle ends in defeat for the Uesugi clan, in their attempt to regain Kawagoe Castle from the Late Hōjō clan in Japan.
- May 28 – Edward Whitchurch and Richard Grafton are granted the exclusive right to publish prayer books for the Church of England by order of King Henry VIII.
- May 29 – David Beaton, the Roman Catholic Archbishop of St Andrews and the only Scottish cardinal, is assassinated at St Andrews Castle by William Kirkcaldy and Norman Leslie in retaliation for the March 28 execution of Protestant preacher George Wishart.
- June 7 – The Treaty of Ardres (also known as the Treaty of Camp) is signed, resulting in peace between the kingdoms of England and France and ending the Italian War of 1542–1546.
- June 17 – The Council of Trent approves its second decree on Roman Catholic doctrine, Decretum de Pecatto Originali, regarding original sin, declaring that excommunication should be applied to any person who denies the teaching that the sins of Adam in the Garden of Eden condemned all of humanity, or that Christian baptism remits the guilt of original sin.

==== July–September ====
- July 4 – After the death of Martin Luther, the leaders of the Lutheran Schmalkaldic League German states (Saxony, Hesse, the Palatinate, Württemberg, Pomerania and Anhalt-Köthen) gather at Ichtershausen as the guests of Saxon Elector John Frederick I in order to make plans to defend against the Roman Catholic forces of the Holy Roman Empire.
- July 8 – the Earl of Arran, Regent of Scotland for Mary, Queen of Scots recaptures Dumbarton Castle from England after a 20-day siege.
- July 10 – The Schmalkaldic War begins with an attack by the Protestant German states against the town of Füssen, a village of the Prince-Bishopric of Augsburg in Bavaria.
- July 20 – Charles V, Holy Roman Emperor, imposes a Reichsacht declaring Schmalkadic leaders John Frederick I, Elector of Saxony and Philip I, Landgrave of Hesse to be outlwas, and directs Maurice, Duke of Saxony to enforce it.
- August 14 – The Scottish Parliament ratifies the Treaty of Ardres.
- August 20 – Claude d'Annebault, Admiral of France, arrives in England to negotiate English approval of the Treaty of Ardres to end the Italian War of 1542–1546.
- August 24 – Mircea the Shepherd, ruler of the Principality of Wallachia (now Romania) stages a surprise attack in the Battle of Periș and decimates the members of the Wallachian nobility (boyars) who oppose his rule.
- August 28 – In the Imperial counterattack in the Schmalkaldic War, the Holy Roman Empire army attacks Frankfurt, the German stronghold of the Schmalkaldic League, but is forced to retreat after a two-day siege.
- September 3 – Ilie II Rareș becomes the new Prince of Moldavia upon the death of his father Petru IV Rareș, in the Moldavian capital, Suceava.
- September 8 – The first Protestant Huguenot church in France, established by Pierre LeClerc and Etienne Mangin at Meaux 25 miles (40 km) from Paris, is seized by the French Army and its 60 members are arrested. Ten women are released and 50 others put on trial for heresy. LeClerc, Mangin and 12 others are burned at the stake on October 8.
- September 23 –Pier Luigi Farnese, already the Duke of Parma and Piacenza, is given control of the Italian cities of Camerino and Nepi by after a donation to the Papal States, ruled by Pope Paul III.
- September 27 – San Salvador, now the capital of the Central American nation of El Salvador, is re-established in a new location at the Valle de Las Hamacas. Until 1545, the colonial capital had been at the Ciudad Vieja, 10 miles (16 km) further northewest, near Suchitoto.

==== October—December ====
- October 8 – The Fourteen of Meaux, French Huguenots found guilty of heresy for practicing the Protestant faith and rejecting Catholicim, are burned at the stake in front of the ruins of the first Reformed Church of France.
- October 17 – Irish noble James Butler, 9th Earl of Ormond, the chief opponent of the policies of Sir Anthony St Leger, England's Lord Deputy of Ireland up until April 1, is fatally poisoned after being invited to the Ely Palace near London. Ormond dies 11 days later, and no investigation is carried out by the Crown as to whether St Leger is involved. St Leger becomes the Lord Deputy again less than three weeks after Ormond's death.
- October 28 – (4th waxing of Tazaungmon 908 ME) A second campaign begins in the Toungoo–Mrauk-U War in what is now the Asian nation of Myanmar, as King Tabinshwehti of Burma starts an invasion of the Kingdom of Mrauk U (led by Min Bin) in the Arakan Mountains. King Tabinshwehti dispatches 19,000 troops, 400 horses, and 60 elephants, with 4,000 invading by land and the other 15,000 being transported on a fleet of 800 war boats, 500 armored war boats, and 100 cargo boats through the Bay of Bengal to the coast of Mrauk U.
- November 4 – Christ Church, Oxford, is refounded as a college by Henry VIII of England under this name.
- November 8 – (5 Cimi 19 Xul, Mayan calendar) An uprising by the Maya civilization against the Spanish colonial administrators of New Spain begins in the Yucatan area of Mexico, with simultaneous attacks at Mérida, Valladolid, and Bacalar. The attack comes from seven Mayan provinces on the Gulf of Mexico, Cupul, Cochuah, Sotuta, Tases, Uaymil, Chetumal, and Chikinchel. The rebellion is suppressed by March and the instigators are arrested and executed.
- November 10 – The European colonists defending the city of Diu in Portuguese India defeat the six-month siege that had been started by the Gujarat Sultanate on April 20. The Portuguese victory comes three days after the arrival of 3,000 troops and 38 ships.
- November 14 – The Treaty of Prague is signed between King Ferdinand of Bohemia and Maurice, Elector of Saxony with Ferdinand agreeing not to give shelter in Bohemia to John Ferdinand I, the former Elector of Saxony, who is under an Imperial ban.
- December 12 – Thomas Howard, 3rd Duke of Norfolk and the Lord High Treasurer of England since 1522 is arrested along with his eldest son, Henry Howard, Earl of Surrey and both are imprisoned in the Tower of London. The Earl of Surrey is executed for treason on January 19; the Duke of Norfolk is sentenced to death, but before the sentence can be carried out, King Henry VIII passes away and Norfolk remains in the Tower until being pardoned in 1553.
- December 18 – A truce is agreed to between the Kingdom of Scotland (led by the Regent Arran) and the "Catilians", a group of Scottish Protestants who have been holding St Andrews Castle since their May 29 assassination of Cardinal David Beaton. With England's King Henry VIII threatening an invasion to protect the Protestant Castilians, the parties agree that no action will be taken until the Pope can consider whether to absolve the Protestants of murder, and that if the Pope grants the absolution, the Protestants will be allowed to surrender on good terms.
- December 19 – Trinity College, Cambridge, is founded by Henry VIII of England.
- December 30 – Less than a month before his death, King Henry VIII of England revises his last will and testament and designates his preference for the line of succession to the throne. The first four people on the list serve as monarchs at different times, starting with Edward VI (1547-1553), Mary I (1553-1558) and Elizabeth I (1558-1603). The fourth in the line of succession, Lady Jane Grey, reigns for nine days after the death of Edward before Mary assumes the throne.

==== Date unknown ====
- Katharina von Bora flees to Magdeburg.
- Michelangelo is made chief architect of St. Peter's Basilica in Rome.
- The Spanish conquest of Yucatán is interrupted by an uprising of the Eastern Provinces of the completed in November, but the conquest is completed by March of 1548.

=== 1547 ===
==== January–March ====
- January 8 – The first Lithuanian-language book, a Catechism (Katekizmo paprasti žodžiai, Simple Words of Catechism), is published in Königsberg by Martynas Mažvydas.
- January 13 – Henry Howard, Earl of Surrey is sentenced to death for treason in England.
- January 16 – Grand Prince Ivan IV is crowned as Tsar of all Russia at the Dormition Cathedral in Moscow, thereby proclaiming the Tsardom of Russia.
- January 28 – King Henry VIII of England dies in London, and is succeeded by his 9-year-old son Edward VI, as King of England.
- February 20 – Edward VI of England is crowned at Westminster Abbey.
- March 31 – King Francis I of France dies at the Château de Rambouillet and is succeeded by his eldest surviving son Henry II (on his 28th birthday) as King of France.

==== April–June ====
- April 4 – Catherine Parr, widow of King Henry VIII of England, secretly marries Thomas Seymour, 1st Baron Seymour of Sudeley.
- April 24 – Battle of Mühlberg: Emperor Charles V defeats the Lutheran forces of the Schmalkaldic League and takes John Frederick I.
- May 19 – John Frederick I signs the Capitulation of Wittenberg in order to have his life spared by the Holy Roman Empire.
- May 23 – The Protestant Schmalkaldic League defeats the Catholic Army of the Holy Roman Empire at the Battle of Drakenburg. Of 6,000 Imperial troops, 2,500 are killed and another 2,500 are taken prisoner by the Protestants.
- June 4 – Maurice, Duke of Saxony is formally raised to the status of the Elector.
- June 13 – A peace treaty is signed between by representatives of the Holy Roman Empire and of the Ottoman Empire and France after the Empire's defeat at the 1543 Siege of Nice.
- June 21 – The apparition of Mary, mother of Jesus is seen by several women in the Sicilian city of Alcamo. She becomes the patron saint of the city and is celebrated as the Madonna of Miracles (la Madonna dei Miracoli)
- June 23 – Philip I, Landgrave of Hesse and John Frederick I, Elector of Saxony, leaders of the Schmalkaldic League who were both captured at the battle of Muhlberg, are transported to south Germany and imprisoned for their revolt against the Empire.
- June 26 – King Henri of France orders the division of France's easternmost provinces and divides them into three zones of control, each administered by a Marshal of the Army. Harding, Robert (1978). Anatomy of a Power Elite: the Provincial Governors in Early Modern France. Yale University Press. p. 29.
- June 29 – A fleet of 21 French galleys, commanded by Leone Strozzi, arrives at Fife in Scotland and begins the siege of St Andrews Castle. The siege lasts for a month before John Knox and Protestant nobles surrender on July 31.

==== July–September ====
- July 10 – In France, a duel takes place at between Guy I de Chabot, the future Baron of Jarnac, and François de Vivonne, Lord of La Châtaigneraie, in front of the Château de Saint-Germain-en-Laye. Vivonne, known for his fencing ability, is wounded and dies the next day.
- July 17 – After the Earl of Arran, Regent of Scotland for Mary, Queen of Scots, is unable to get England to voluntarily return control of Langholm to Scotland, he "reduces it by force.".
- July 25 – The coronation of Henri II as King of France at the Reims Cathedral.
- August 13 – The Duchy of Brittany unites with the Kingdom of France.
- September 10
  - Battle of Pinkie Cleugh: An English army under the Duke of Somerset, Lord Protector of England, defeats a Scottish army under James Hamilton, 2nd Earl of Arran, the Regent. The English seize Edinburgh.
  - Conspirators led by Ferrante Gonzaga murder Pier Luigi Farnese, Duke of Parma and son of the Pope, and hang his body from a window of his palace in Piacenza.

==== October–December ====
- October 13 – (New Moon of Thadinovut 909 ME) With the end of the Buddhist Lent, the Kingdom of Burma (now Myanmar) mobilizes to invade the Kingdom of Arakan (now Thailand).
- The English Parliament, the first convened since the death of King Henry VIII, is opened by King Edward VI.
- November 5 – Catherine Parr, the former Queen consort of England and widow of King Henry VIII, publishes her book The Lamentation of a Sinner.
- November 15 – A fleet of 60 Ottoman Navy ships, commanded by Piri Reis, arrives at the port of Aden (now in Yemen) and captures the city in slightly more than three months, by February 26, 1548.
- December 6 – The Battle of Perlis River is fought between the Portuguese Navy and the navy of the Aceh Sultanate (now a province of Indonesia) at the Perlis River in Malaysia. With nine light warships and 230 soldiers, the Portuguese sink or capture 45 of the 60 ships of Aceh vessel leave 4,000 of their 5,380 soldiers dead or missing.
- December 24 – King Edward VI of England gives royal assent to numerous laws enacted by Parliament, including the Treason Act and the Vagabonds Act.
- December 28 – Sir John Luttrell of England, recently victorious over Scotland in the Battle of Pinkie, raids the Scottish port of Burntisland on the Firth of Forth, after his uncle Thomas Wyndham brings two Royal Navy warships. Luttrell and Wyndhamburn ships and buildings on the pier and capture Rossend Castle

==== Date unknown ====
- Huguenots increasingly immigrate to the English county of Kent, especially Canterbury, from France.
- The Chambre Ardente is established in Paris for trying heretics.
- Work on construction of the Château de Chambord, in the Loire Valley, for Francis I of France, ceases.
- John Dee visits the Low Countries, to study navigation with Gemma Frisius.
- Edward VI of England outlaws execution by boiling.

=== 1548 ===
==== January–March ====
- January 5 – Abu al-Abbas Ahmad III, ruler of the Hafsid Sultanate in what is now Tunisia in northern Africa, renews the 1547 treaty of friendship with Spain that had been signed by representatives of his father.
- January 19 – Three ships from the Portuguese Navy arrive at the port of Aden to assist Mohammed bin Ali al-Tawlaki, who has been defending the city against an attack by the Ottoman Navy. The Portuguese ships are forced to retreat to Zeila in Somalia, where 120 survivors are captured and their ships are burned.
- January 27 – King Henri II of France makes the Châtillon agreement, a contract for betrothal for an arranged marriage between his four year old son, Prince Francois, to the five year old Mary, Queen of Scots, to take place in 1558.
- January 28 – (Tenbun 17, 30th day of 12th month) Nagao Kagetora (later Uesugi Kenshin) leads a triumphant entry into Kasugayama Castle in Japan, replacing his older brother Nagao Harukage as the lead samurai in the Nagao clan that rules the Echigo Province.
- February 2 – On Candlemas day in Scotland, during the Rough Wooing War with England, the Byllye Castle near Auchencrow is captured by a force of 11 English soldiers led by Thomas Carlile, and becomes a garrison for English troops.
- February 14 – (Tenbun 18, 4th day of 1st month) At the Battle of Uedahara, firearms are used for the first time on the battlefield in Japan, and Takeda Shingen is defeated by Murakami Yoshikiyo.
- February 26 – The Ottoman Navy, led by Admiral Ahmed Muhiddin Piri (commonly known as Piri Reis), recaptures Aden.
- March 9 – Le Trung Tong becomes the new Emperor of Dai Viet (corresponding to northern Vietnam) upon the death of his father, Lê Trang Tông.

==== April–June ====
- April 1 – Sigismund II Augustus succeeds his father, Sigismund I the Old, as King of Poland and Grand Duke of Lithuania.
- April 15 – General Zhu Wan of Ming dynasty China dispatches a fleet of ships, commanded by Lu Tang, to destroy smugglers and pirates at Shangyu, a port on Liuheng Island. The fleet sets off from Wenzhou and makes its attack in June.
- May 15 –
  - The Diet of Augsburg approves a decree of Charles V, Holy Roman Emperor, the "Declaration of His Roman Imperial Majesty on the Observance of Religion Within the Holy Empire Until the Decision of the General Council", informally referred to as the Augsburg Interim, directing German Protestants to resume the doctrine of the Roman Catholic Church, including observance of the Seven Sacraments. As a concession, the Emperor allows the continuation of some Protestant customs, including the right of Protestant clergy to marry and for believers to receive the Protestant communion of bread and wine.
  - Ratan Singh of Amber, Raja of the Amber Kingdom in what is now the Indian state of Rajasthan, is poisoned by his younger brother Askaran, Raja of Narwar.
- June 1 –
  - The Japanese city of Uchiyama in Shinano Province (now in the Nagano Prefecture) is burned by the clan of Murakami Yoshikiyo after the February defeat of the Takeda clan at the Battle of Uedahara.
  - Bharmal becomes the new raja of the Kingdom of Amber, in territory now occupied by India's Rajasthan state, upon the overthrow of his nephew, Askaran, Raja of Narwar, who had reigned for only 16 days.
- June 10 – (5th day of the waxing moon in the 8th month of the 910th year of the Chula Sakarat Era): Yotfa, the 13-year-old ruler of the Ayutthaya Kingdom of Thailand since 1546, is murdered with the consent of his mother, the regent Si Sudachan, who installs her lover, Worawongsathirat, on the throne. Yotfa's younger brother, Prince Sissin, is spared from execution. Worawongsathirat and Si Sudachan are both killed in a counter-coup in November.
- June 11 – Suleiman the Magnificent, the Sultan of the Ottoman Empire begins an invasion of Safavid Iran that will last for almost two years before he abandons it.
- June 16 – The first of 8,000 French troops under the command of General André de Montalembert arrive at the port of Leith at the invitation of the King of Scotland, who seeks to drive out the occupying forces of the Army of England.
- June 30 – The Augsburg Interim, approved May 15, is codified into law in the Holy Roman Empire.
- June
  - Ming Chinese naval forces commanded by Zhu Wan destroy the pirate haven of Shuangyu,frequented by Chinese, Japanese and Portuguese smugglers.
  - John Dee starts to study at the Old University of Leuven.

==== July–September ====
- July 7 – A marriage treaty is signed between Scotland and France, whereby five-year-old Mary, Queen of Scots, is betrothed to the future King Francis II of France.
- August 7 – Mary, Queen of Scots, leaves for France.
- September 13 – Archduke Maximilian of Austria, is married to his first cousin, Maria of Spain, at the arrangement of Charles V, Holy Roman Emperor, Maria's father and Maximilian's uncle. Charles, who also serves as King of Spain, makes the arrangement in order to have the couple serve as his regents while he travels to Germany.

==== October–December ====
- October 1 – Archduke Maximilian and Princess Maria, who married 18 days earlier, become the co-regents of Spain as King Charles V departs for Germany to administer the affairs of the Holy Roman Empire. They serve until Prince Philip, the first regent, returns from battle on July 12, 1551.
- October 20 – The city of La Paz, Bolivia, is founded.
- October 31 – At the first sejm of King Sigismund II Augustus of Poland, deputies demand that the king renounce his wife Barbara Radziwiłł.
- November 11 – Worawongsathirat, ruler of the Ayutthaya Kingdom of Thailand after usurping the throne on June 10, stages his coronation along with his wife, Si Sudachan. Both husband and wife had after both conspired to murder her son, King Yofta, in June. The King and Queen are assassinated on January 13, 1549.
- December 17 – King João III of Portugal, creates a colonial government of Brazil, with a capital at Bahia, in order to maintain unity among various Portuguese captaincies (São Vicente, Nova Lusitania, Ilhéus and Porto Seguro) scattered along the coast. The document contains 48 articles governing the installation of the government, the organization of trade, measures for defense, treatment of the indigenous tribes, and policies toward foreigners. The King provides for a Governor-General, and appoints Tomé de Sousa as the first officeholder.
- December – Siam attacks Tavoy, beginning the Burmese–Siamese War of 1548.

=== 1549 ===
==== January–March ====
- January 4 – Gaspare Grimaldi Bracelli begins a two-year term as the Doge of the Republic of Genoa in Italy, succeeding Benedetto Gentile Pevere.
- January 11 – An uprising of the Diaguitas natives outside of the South American Spanish colonial city of La Serena (now in Coquimbo province of Chile) begins. Within a day, the South American village is burned down and nearly every Spanish resident is killed.
- January 19 – Maha Chakkraphat is crowned as the King of Siam after having been installed on the throne in 1548 by Maha Thammaracha of Burma.
- January 21 – The Act of Uniformity 1548 is passed by the Parliament of England and establishes the 1549 version of the Book of Common Prayer as the sole legal prayer book in England, replacing the use of different versions of the Latin-language Missal.
- January – Burmese–Siamese War (1547–49): King Tabinshwehti of Burma begins his invasion of the Ayutthaya Kingdom, which ends in retreat.
- February 3 – Burmese–Siamese War: Burmese viceroy Thado Dhamma Yaza I of Prome slays Sri Suriyothai, queen consort of the Ayutthaya Kingdom, on her war elephant, when she intervenes in battle to protect the life of her husband.
- March 29 – The city of Salvador da Bahia, Brazil's first capital, is founded by Tome de Sousa.

==== April–June ====
- April 8 – Giovanni Angelo Medici is appointed as a Roman Catholic cardinal by Pope Paul III, effective May 10. In 1559, Medici is elected as Pope Pius IV.
- April 14 – Prince Zhu Zairui, age 12, heir to the throne of Ming dynasty China as the oldest living son of the Jiajing Emperor, dies a few days after becoming ill during the Guan Li coming of age ceremony.
- April 15 – Spanish Jesuit missionary Francis Xavier departs from Goa on a mission to bring Christian ministry to Japan.
- April 23 – In County Wicklow in Ireland, Phelim O'Toole is granted a pardon by the King for unspecified offenses.
- May 15 – King Henri II of France makes a triumphant return to Paris after suppressing the Revolt of the Pitauds in Bordeaux.

==== July–September ====
- June 9 – The Book of Common Prayer is introduced in English churches; the Prayer Book Rebellion against it breaks out in the West Country.
- June 19 – In the war of the Rough Wooing between Scotland and England, a Scottish and French force commanded by André de Montalembert retakes the island of Inchkeith, killing more than 300 soldiers from the English Army.
- July 8 – Kett's Rebellion, with 18,000 troops led by Robert Kett, breaks out at Wymondham in East Anglia, against fences and enclosures put up by wealthy landowners. and in Oxfordshire, against landowners associated with religious changes.
- July 18 – (Tenbun 18, 24th day of the 7th month) In the Battle of Eguchi, fought in Japan's Settsu Province near Osaka, General Miyoshi Nagayoshi defies the Governor, Hosokawa Harumoto, to attack the Eguchi Castle of Nagayoshi's cousin, Miyoshi Masanaga. After a 12-day battle, Miyoshi Masanaga is killed along with several of Hosokawa's other generals. Governor Hosokawa, fearing a reprisal, flees and eventually loses his authority over Settsu Province.
- July 21 – Thomas Cranmer, Archbishop of Canterbury, delivers his most important sermon, speaking at St Paul's Cathedral to defend the Church of England's reasons for uniformly requiring the use of The Book of Common Prayer.
- July 27 – (Tenbun 18, 3rd day of the 7th month) European Jesuit Francis Xavier arrives in Japan at the port of Kagoshima, the first Christian missionary there, but is not allowed to go to shore until three weeks later.
- July 29 – Norwich, in Norfolk falls to Kett's rebels.
- August 1– Kett's rebels defeat a Royal Army led by William Parr, Marquess of Northampton
- August 8– England and France declare war.
- August 15 – Francis Xavier, his translator Anjirō, and three other Jesuit priests are allowed to come ashore at Kagoshima in Japan.
- August 17 – Battle of Sampford Courtenay in England: The Prayer Book Rebellion is quashed.
- August 27 – At the Battle of Dussindale in England, Kett's Rebellion is ended by troops led by John Dudley, 1st Duke of Northumberland.
- September 17 – The Council of Trent is prorogued indefinitely.
- September 19 – The English Army abandons Haddington, East Lothian as it continues its retreat from Scottish and French forces.
- September 29 – Shimazu Takahisa, the ruling daimyo of Japan's Satsuma Province, welcomes the Jesuit party of Francis Xavier.

==== October–December ====
- October 5 – Sir Thomas Smith is replaced by Ambassador Nicholas Wotton as the second Secretary of State of England, primarily in charge of England's foreign affairs. Wotton serves for less than a year before being dispatched by King Edward VI back to France.
- October 11 – Edward Seymour, 1st Duke of Somerset, the Lord Protector of England and Lord High Treasurer since 1547, is arrested on orders of the Regency Council on charges of "ambition, vainglory, entering into rash wars" as well as malfeasance and improper use of the royal treasury.
- October 22 – Catherine of Habsburg, daughter of Ferdinand, Duke of Habsburg, marries Francesco III Gonzaga, Duke of Mantua. Francesco, only 16 years old, dies of pneumonia after only four months of marriage.
- November 4 – The Pragmatic Sanction is proclaimed by Charles V, Holy Roman Emperor. The Seventeen Provinces of the Habsburg Low Countries are declared inseparable.
- November 10 – Pope Paul III dies at the age of 81 after a reign of 15 years.
- December 3 – The papal conclave to decide on a successor to Pope Paul III, goes into session in the Apostolic Palace in Rome with 51 cardinal electors.Participants at the papal conclave agree to elect the next Pope by secret ballot.
- December 7 – Robert Kett is hanged from the walls of Norwich Castle after being found guilty of treason for leading Kett's Rebellion. His brother William is hanged from the walls of Wymondham Abbey on the same day.
- December 21 – Ottoman Empire Sultan Suleiman the Magnificent abandons his campaign against Safavid Iran after 21 months, during which he was unable to proceed further than Tabriz.

==== Date unknown ====
- Peter Canisius starts the Counter-Reformation in Bavaria.
- The spire of Lincoln Cathedral in England is blown down, leaving St. Olaf's Church, Tallinn, in Estonia as the World's tallest structure.
- Although trade existed between the two beforehand, in this year the Portuguese begin to send regular seasonal maritime trade missions to Ming dynasty China, at Sao João Island (also known as Shangchuan Island) near Macau.
- Siege of Kajiki: firearms are used for the first time in a siege in Japanese history. (The previous year's Battle of Uedahara was the first battle in which they were used.)
- Excerpta antiqua is published by Hervagius at Basel, Switzerland.
- Maidstone Grammar School is founded in England by Edward Seymour, Duke of Somerset.

== Births ==
1540

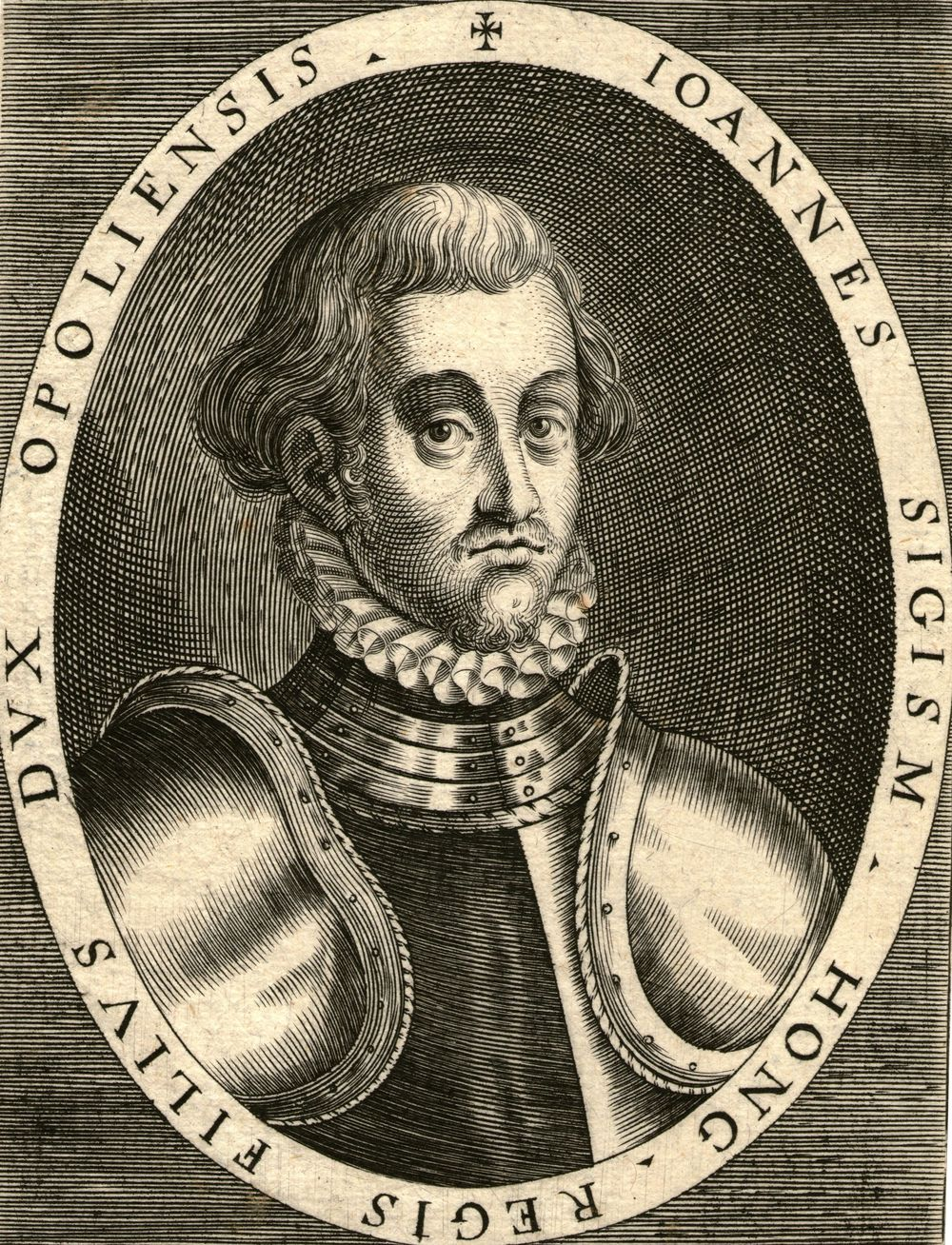
John Sigismund Zápolya

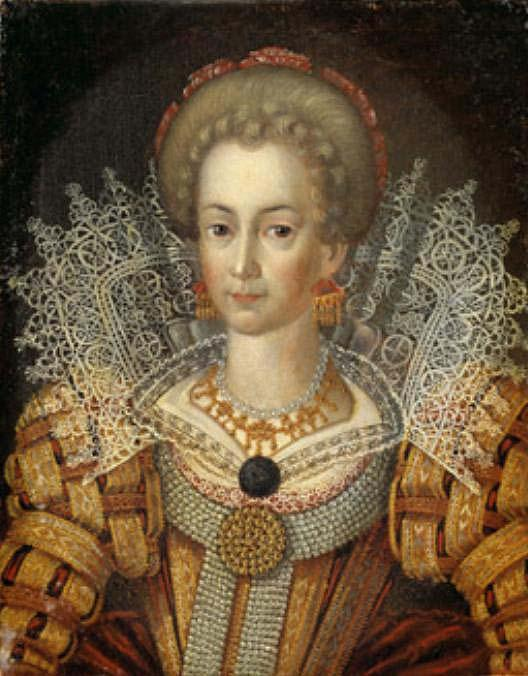
Princess Cecilia of Sweden

- January 18 – Catarina of Portugal, Duchess of Braganza, claimant to the Portuguese throne in 1580 (d. 1614)
- January 25 – Edmund Campion, English Jesuit and Roman Catholic martyr (d. 1581)
- January 28 – Ludolph van Ceulen, German mathematician (d. 1610)
- February 12 – Won Gyun, Korean general and admiral during the Joseon Dynasty (d. 1597)
- February 23 – Hedwig of Brandenburg, Duchess of Brunswick-Wolfenbüttel (d. 1602)
- February 25 – Henry Howard, 1st Earl of Northampton, English aristocrat and courtier (d. 1614)
- March 1 – Enrique de Guzmán, 2nd Count of Olivares, Spanish noble (d. 1607)
- March 17 – Bernhard VII, Prince of Anhalt-Zerbst, German prince of the House of Ascania (d. 1570)
- April 3 – Maria de' Medici, Italian noble (d. 1557)
- April 8 – Toyotomi Hidenaga, Japanese warlord (d. 1591)
- May 9 – Maharana Pratap, Indian warrior king (d. 1597)
- May 14
  - Paolo Paruta, Italian historian (d. 1598)
  - Bartholomäus Scultetus, German mayor of Görlitz, astronomer (d. 1614)
- May 22 – James, Duke of Rothesay, Scottish prince (d. 1541)
- May 31 – Henry Cheyne, 1st Baron Cheyne, English politician and baron (d. 1587)
- June 3 – Charles II, Archduke of Austria, regent of Inner Austria (d. 1590)
- June 9 – Shima Sakon, Japanese samurai (d. 1600)
- June 11 – Barnabe Googe, English poet (d. 1594)
- June 29 – Ana de Mendoza, Princess of Eboli, Spanish countess (d. 1592)
- June 30 – Countess Palatine Elisabeth of Simmern-Sponheim, Duchess of Saxony (d. 1594)
- July 7 – John Sigismund Zápolya, King of Hungary (d. 1571)
- July 11 – Adolf of Nassau, Count of Nassau, Dutch soldier (d. 1568)
- July 16 – Alfonso Carafa, Italian cardinal (d. 1565)
- July 19 – Ludowika Margaretha of Zweibrücken-Bitsch, spouse of Count Philip V of Hanau-Lichtenberg (d. 1569)
- August 4 – Sisto Fabri, Italian theologian (d. 1594)
- August 5 – Joseph Justus Scaliger, French Protestant scholar (d. 1609)
- August 25 – Lady Catherine Grey, English noblewoman, potential successor to the throne (d. 1568)
- September 5 – Magnus, Duke of Holstein, Prince of Denmark (d. 1583)
- September 9 – John VII, Count of Oldenburg (d. 1603)
- October 1 – Johann Jakob Grynaeus, Swiss Protestant clergyman (d. 1617)
- November 12 – Anna of Veldenz, Margrave of Baden (d. 1586)
- November 16 – Princess Cecilia of Sweden (d. 1627)
- December 8 – Giovanni Vincenzo Gonzaga, Italian Catholic cardinal (d. 1591)
- December 21 – Thomas Schweicker, German artist (d. 1602)
- December 28 – Charles I, Duke of Mecklenburg (d. 1610)
- December 31 – Silvio Antoniano, Italian Catholic cardinal (d. 1603)
- date unknown
  - Andrea Andreani, Italian wood engraver (d. 1623)
  - Inés de Hinojosa, Venezuelan hacendada (d. 1571)
  - Francis Drake, English sea captain, privateer, navigator, slaver, pirate and politician (d. 1596)
  - Christopher Hatton, English politician (d. 1591)
  - George Hastings, 4th Earl of Huntingdon, English nobleman (d. 1604)
  - Pierre Jeannin, French statesman (d. 1622)
  - François Viète, French mathematician (d. 1603)
  - Amago Yoshihisa, Japanese samurai and warlord (d. 1610)
- probable
  - William Byrd, English composer (d. 1623)
  - Bernardino de Mendoza, Spanish military commander (d. 1604)
  - Paschal Baylon, Spanish friar (d. 1592)

1541

- January 24 – Magdalena Moons, Dutch woman associated with the 1574 Siege of Leiden (d. 1613)
- January 26 – Florent Chrestien, French writer (d. 1596)
- February 21 – Philipp V, Count of Hanau-Lichtenberg (d. 1599)
- March 25 – Francesco I de' Medici, Grand Duke of Tuscany (d. 1587)
- April 8 – Michele Mercati, Italian physician and gardener (d. 1593)
- April 12 – Ipatii Potii, Metropolitan of Kiev (d. 1613)
- September 7
  - Luigi Groto, Italian lutenist and poet (d. 1588)
  - Hernando de Cabezón, Spanish musician (d. 1602)
- September 5 – Roberto de' Nobili, Italian Catholic cardinal (d. 1559
- September 21 – Anna of Nassau-Dillenburg, Countess consort of Nassau-Weilburg (d. 1616)
- November 9 – Menso Alting, Dutch preacher and reformer (d. 1612)
- November 25 – Michele Bonelli, Italian Catholic cardinal (d. 1598)
- February 12 – Johann Bauhin, Swiss botanist (d. 1613)
- date unknown
  - Pierre Charron, French philosopher (d. 1603)
  - El Greco, or Domênikos Theotokópoulos (Greek: Δομήνικος Θεοτοκόπουλος), Cretian painter, sculptor and architect (d. 1614)
  - Hatano Hideharu, Japanese samurai (d. 1579)
  - Mizuno Tadashige, Japanese nobleman (d. 1600)
  - Guðbrandur Þorláksson, Icelandic mathematician (d. 1627)
  - Hattori Hanzō, Japanese ninja who served under Tokugawa Ieyasu (d. 1596)

1542

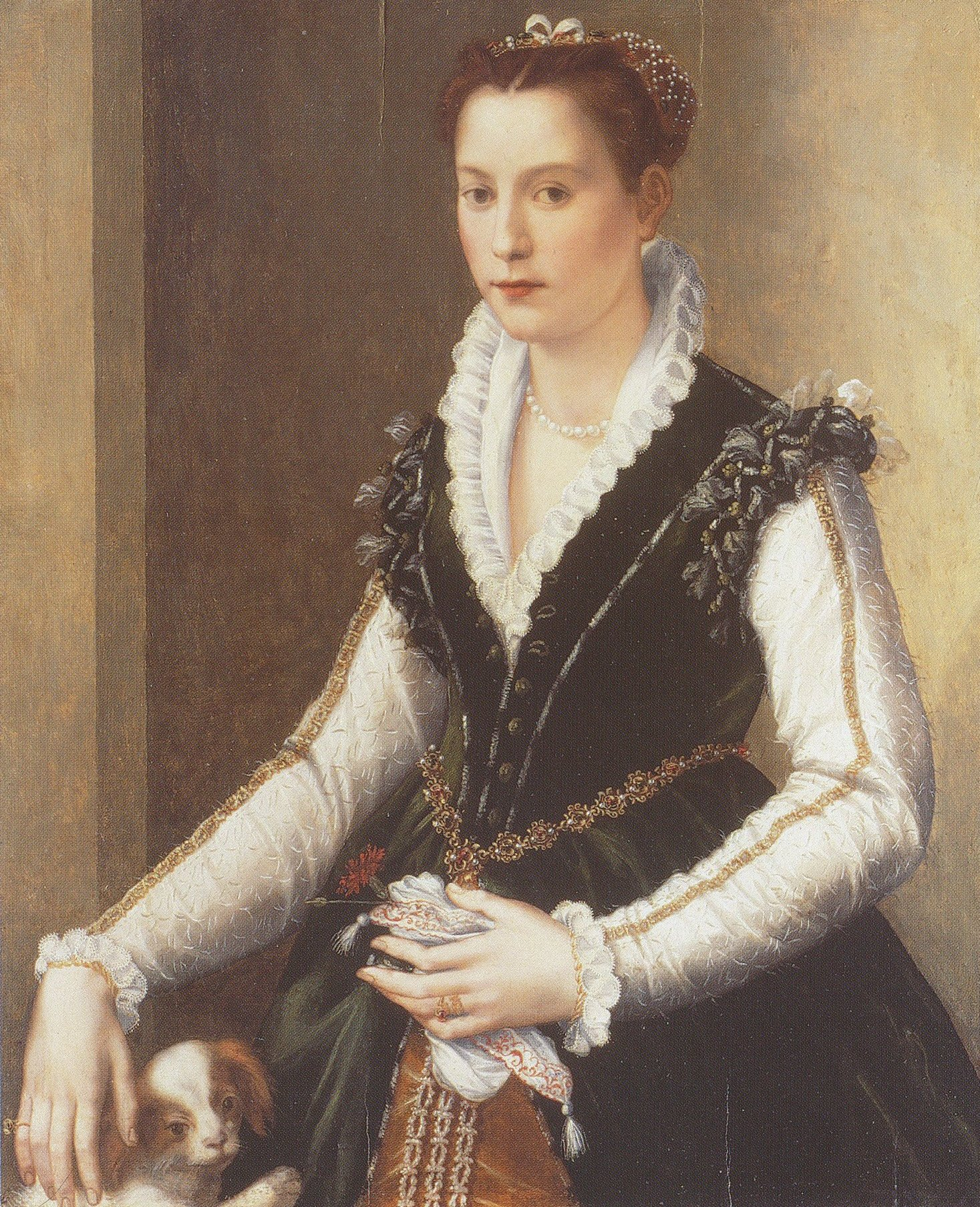
Isabella de' Medici

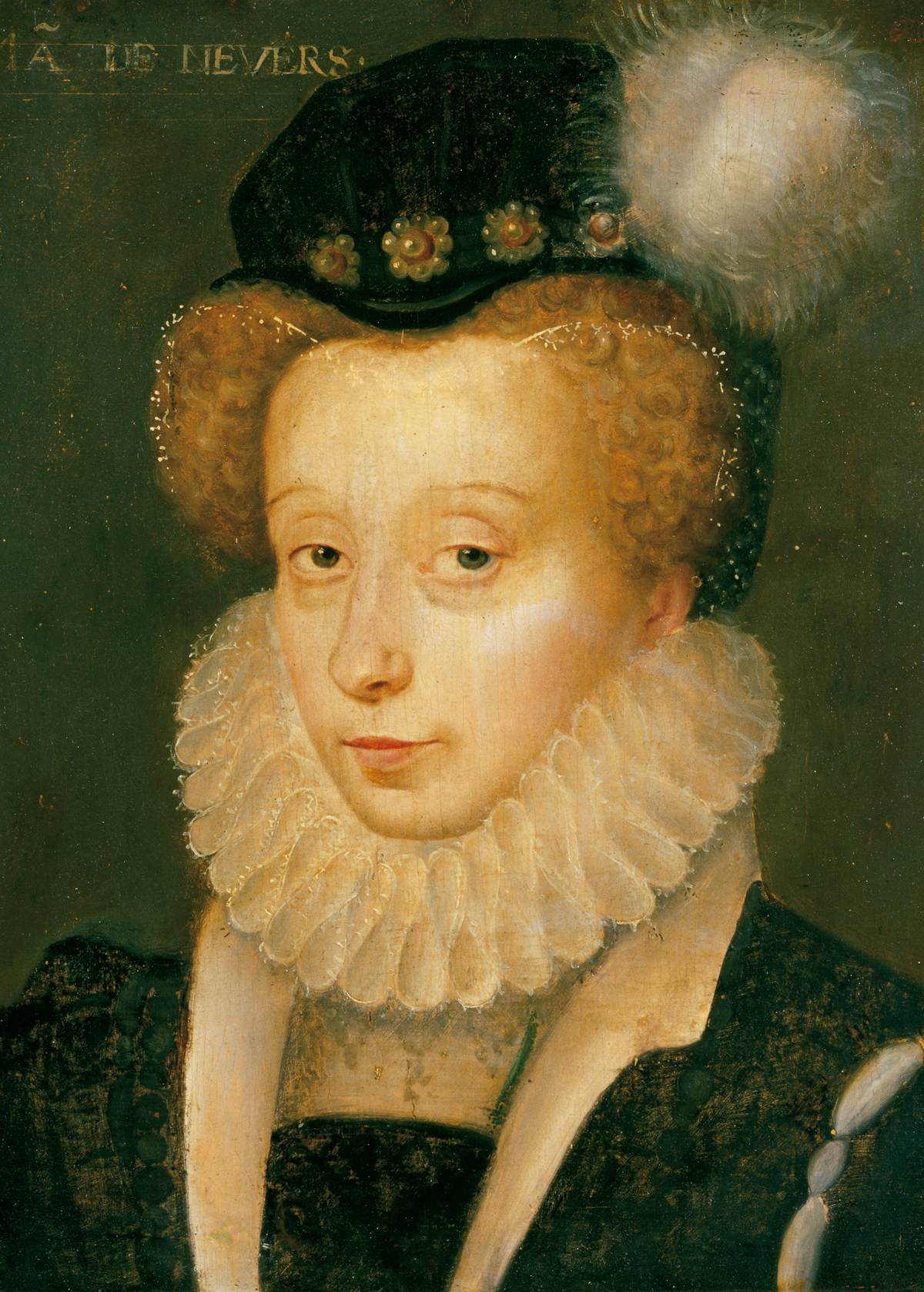
Henriette of Cleves

- February 1 – John Scudamore, English politician (d. 1623)
- February 22 – Santino Garsi da Parma, Italian musician (d. 1604)
- March 19 – Jan Zamoyski, Polish nobleman (d. 1605)
- April 29 – Henry III, Duke of Münsterberg-Oels (d. 1587)
- May 5 – Thomas Cecil, 1st Earl of Exeter, English politician (d. 1623)
- May 11 – Jakob Christoph Blarer von Wartensee, Swiss Catholic bishop (d. 1608)
- May 16 – Anna Sibylle of Hanau-Lichtenberg, German noblewoman, daughter of Count Philip IV of Hanau-Lichtenberg (d. 1580)
- June 15 – Richard Grenville, English politician (d. 1591)
- June 24 – John of the Cross, Spanish Carmelite mystic, theologian, poet (d. 1591)
- July 25 – Magnus, Duke of Östergötland, Swedish prince (d. 1595)
- Between August 18 and August 28 – Charles Neville, 6th Earl of Westmorland (d. 1601)
- August 27 – John Frederick, Duke of Pomerania and Protestant Bishop of Cammin (d. 1600)
- August 31 – Isabella de' Medici, Italian princess (d. 1576)
- September 25 – Elisabeth of Nassau-Dillenburg, sister of William the Silent (d. 1603)
- October 1 – Álvaro de Mendaña de Neira, Spanish explorer (d. 1595)
- October 4 – Robert Bellarmine, Italian saint (d. 1621)
- October 14 – Philip IV, Count of Nassau-Weilburg (d. 1602)
- October 15 – Akbar, Mughal Emperor (d. 1605)
- October 31 – Henriette of Cleves, Duchess of Nevers, Countess of Rethel (d. 1601)
- November 1 – Tarquinia Molza, Italian singer (d. 1617)
- November 9 – Anders Sørensen Vedel, Danish historian (d. 1616)
- November 11 – Scipione Gonzaga, Italian Catholic cardinal (d. 1593)
- December 8 – Mary, Queen of Scots (d. 1587)
- December 21 – Thomas Allen, English mathematician and astrologer, some suggest 1540 (d. 1632)
- date unknown
  - Joris Hoefnagel, Dutch painter and engraver (d. 1601)
  - Toda Kazuaki, Japanese samurai in the service of Tokugawa Ieyasu (d. 1604)
  - Douglas Sheffield, Baroness Sheffield, lover of Robert Dudley, 1st Earl of Leicester (d. 1608)
  - Horio Yoshiharu, Japanese daimyō (d. 1611)
  - Kuki Yoshitaka, Japanese naval commander (d. 1600)

1543

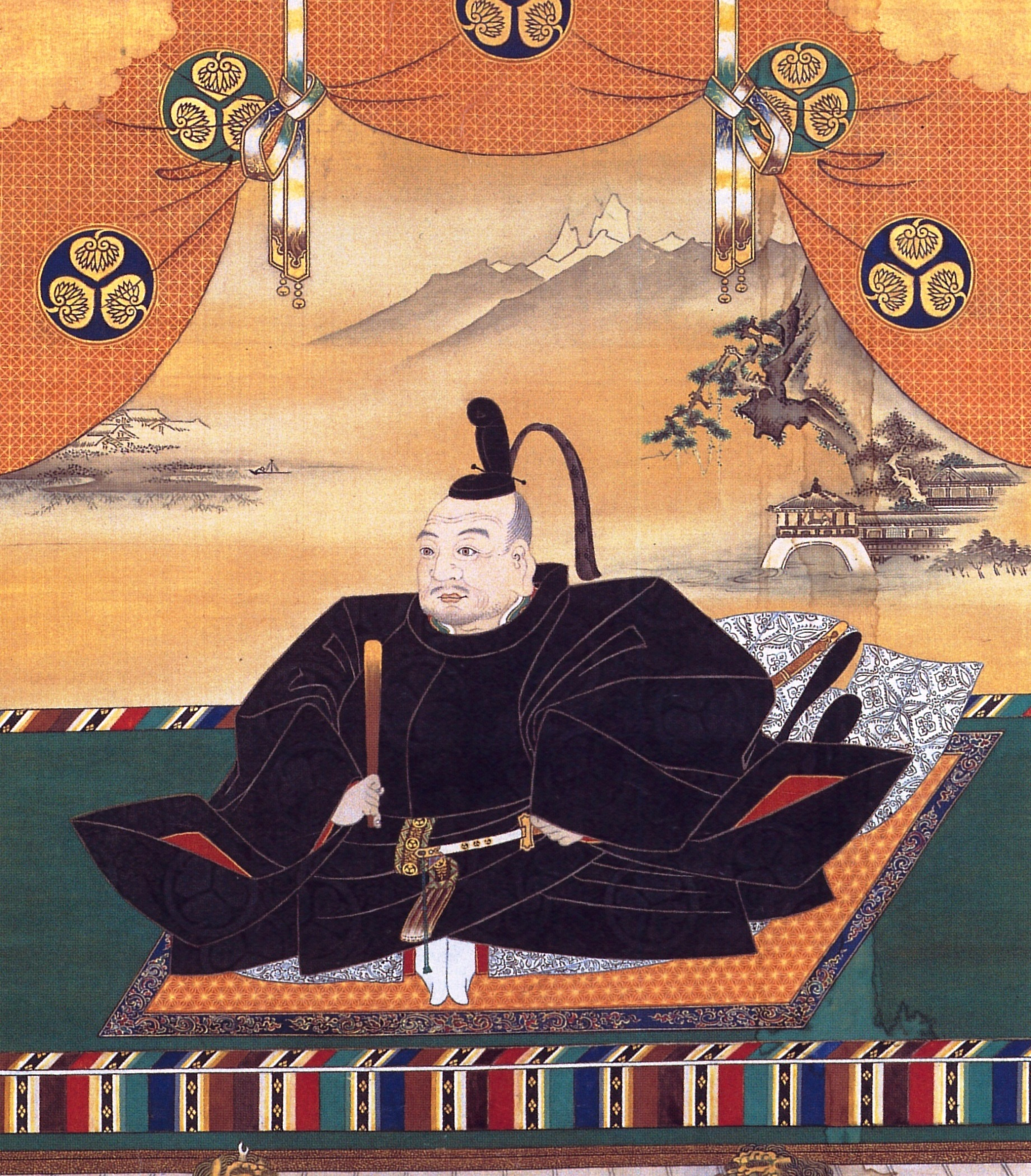
Tokugawa Ieyasu

- January 18 (baptized) – Alfonso Ferrabosco, Italian composer (d. 1588)
- January 31 – Tokugawa Ieyasu, Japanese shōgun (d. 1616)
- February 4 – Johannes Heurnius, Dutch physician (d. 1601)
- February 4 – Giovanni Francesco Fara, Italian writer (d. 1591)
- February 16 – Kanō Eitoku, Japanese painter (d. 1590)
- February 18 – Charles III, Duke of Lorraine (d. 1608)
- February 25 – Sharaf Khan Bidlisi, Emir of Bitlis (d. 1603)
- March 7 – John Casimir of the Palatinate-Simmern, German prince and reigning count palatine of Simmern (d. 1592)
- April 1 – François de Bonne, Duke of Lesdiguières, Constable of France (d. 1626)
- April 11 – George John I, Count Palatine of Veldenz (d. 1592)
- May 2 – Jan Moretus, Belgian printer (d. 1610)
- June 8 – Petrus Albinus, German historian, local history researcher and poet (d. 1598)
- June 29 – Christine of Hesse, duchess consort of Holstein-Gottorp (1465-1486) (d. 1604)
- July 20 – Nils Svantesson Sture, Swedish diplomat (d. 1567)
- August 3 – Nicasius de Sille, Dutch diplomat (d. 1600)
- August 21 – Giovanni Bembo, Doge of Venice (d. 1618)
- September 14 – Claudio Acquaviva, Italian Jesuit (d. 1615)
- October 21 – Michael Hicks, English politician (d. 1612)
- November 2 – Kasper Franck, German theologian (d. 1584)
- November 8 – Lettice Knollys, English noblewoman (d. 1634)
- December 3 – Alessandro Riario, Italian Catholic cardinal (d. 1585)
- December 29 – Catherine of Nassau-Dillenburg, daughter of William I (d. 1624)
- date unknown
  - Nicolas de Neufville, seigneur de Villeroy, 2nd Prime Minister of France (d. 1617)
  - Thomas Deloney, English novelist and balladeer (d. 1600)
  - Domenico Fontana, Italian architect (d. 1607)
  - Sonam Gyatso, 3rd Dalai Lama, first Dalai Lama (d. 1588)
  - François Pithou, French lawyer and author (d. 1621)
  - Hayyim ben Joseph Vital, Syrian Jewish rabbi and mystic (d. 1620)
  - Chen Lin, Ming Dynasty general (d. 1607)
- probable
  - Giovanni Maria Nanino, Italian composer (d. 1607)
  - Federico Zuccari, Italian painter (d. 1609)

1544

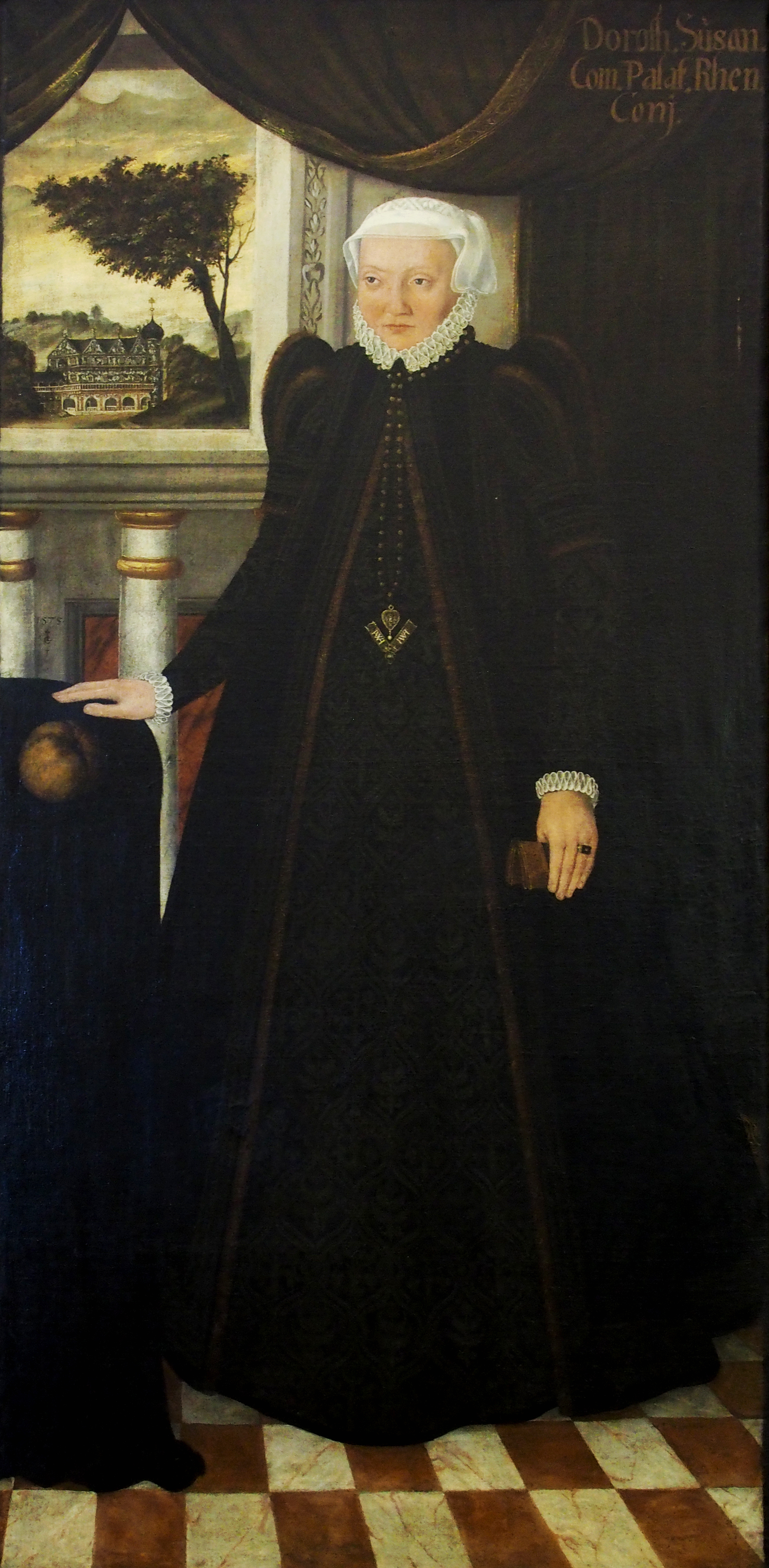
Dorothea Susanne of Simmern

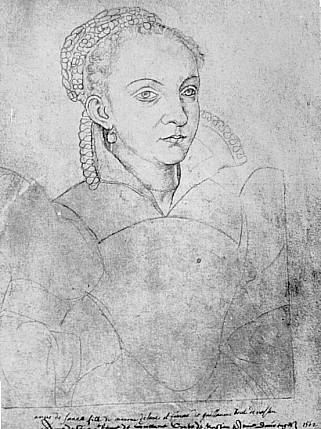
Anna of Saxony

- January 19 – King Francis II of France (d. 1560)
- January 24 – Gillis van Coninxloo, Flemish painter (d. 1607)
- February 3 – César de Bus, French Catholic priest (d. 1607)
- March 11 – Torquato Tasso, Italian poet (d. 1595)
- April – Thomas Fleming, English judge (d. 1613)
- April 20 – Renata of Lorraine, duchess consort of Bavaria (d. 1602)
- May 24 – William Gilbert, English scientist and astronomer (d. 1603)
- July 14 – Henry Compton, 1st Baron Compton, English politician (d. 1589)
- August 9 – Bogislaw XIII, Duke of Pomerania (d. 1606)
- September 1 – John Gordon, Scottish bishop (d. 1619)
- September 28 or September 29 – Giovanni de' Medici, Italian Catholic cardinal (d. 1562)
- November 1 – Hasan Kafi Pruščak, Bosnian scholar and judge (d. 1615)
- November 15 – Dorothea Susanne of Simmern, Duchess of Saxe-Weimar (d. 1592)
- December 23 – Anna of Saxony, only child and heiress of Maurice, Elector of Saxony (d. 1577)
- date unknown
  - Richard Bancroft, Archbishop of Canterbury (d. 1610)
  - Thomas Hobson, English carrier and origin of the phrase Hobson's choice (d. 1631)
  - Maddalena Casulana, Italian composer, lutenist and singer (d. 1590)
- probable
  - George Whetstone, English writer (d. 1587)

1545

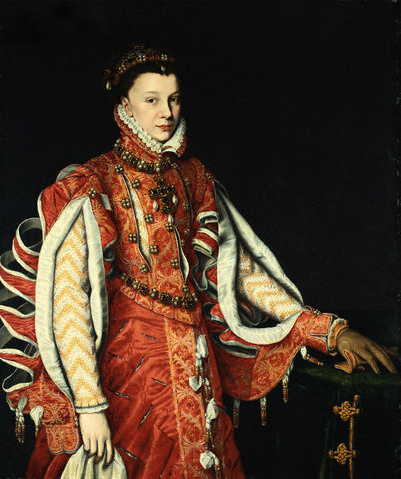
Elisabeth of Valois

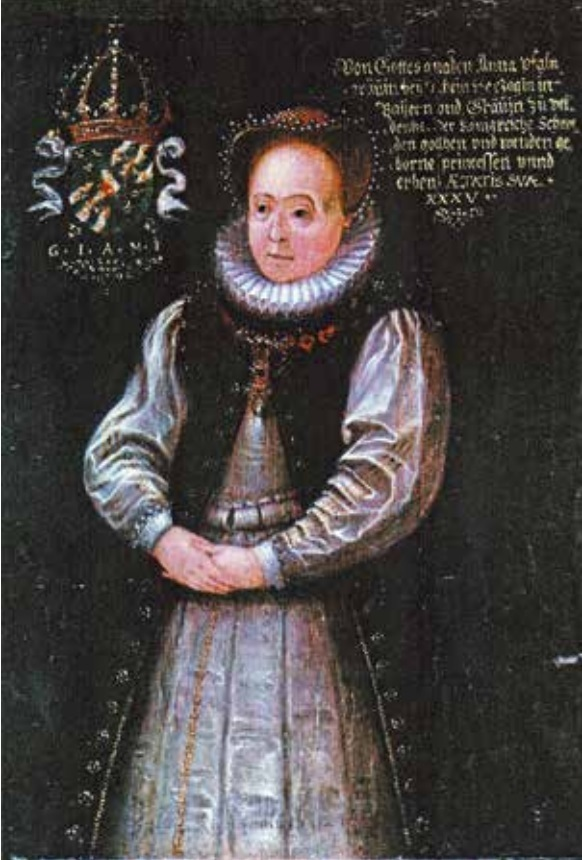
Anna Maria of Sweden

- January 1 – Magnus Heinason, Faroese naval hero (d. 1589)
- January 11 – Guidobaldo del Monte, Italian mathematician, astronomer and philosopher (d. 1607)
- March – Gaspare Tagliacozzi, Italian surgeon and anatomist (d. 1599)
- March 2 – Thomas Bodley, English diplomat and scholar, founder of the Bodleian Library, Oxford (d. 1613)
- March 18 – Julius Echter von Mespelbrunn, German bishop (d. 1617)
- March 25 – John II, Duke of Schleswig-Holstein-Sonderburg, Duke of Schleswig-Holstein-Sønderburg (d. 1622)
- April 1 – Peder Claussøn Friis, Norwegian clergyman and author (d. 1614)
- April 2 – Elisabeth of Valois, queen of Philip II of Spain (d. 1568)
- April 15 – Karl II, Duke of Münsterberg-Oels, Duke of Oels (1565–1617), Duke of Bernstadt (1604–1617) (d. 1617)
- April 24 – Henry Wriothesley, 2nd Earl of Southampton, English earl (d. 1581)
- April 28 – Yi Sun-sin, Korean naval commander (d. 1598)
- May 1 – Franciscus Junius, French theologian (d. 1602)
- May 22 – Karl Christoph, Duke of Münsterberg (d. 1569)
- June 6 – Jerome Gratian, Spanish Carmelite and writer (d. 1614)
- June 13 – Naitō Nobunari, Japanese samurai and daimyō of Omi Province (d. 1612)
- June 19 – Princess Anna Maria of Sweden, Swedish royal (d. 1610)
- July 8 – Don Carlos of Spain, son of Philip II of Spain (d. 1568)
- August 1 – Andrew Melville, Scottish theologian and religious reformer (d. 1622)
- August 27 – Alexander Farnese, Duke of Parma (d. 1592)
- September 7 – Eitel Friedrich IV, Count of Hohenzollern, First Count of Hohenzollern-Hechingen (d. 1605)
- September 20 – Yamanaka Yukimori, Japanese samurai (d. 1578)
- October 15 – Elisabeth of Anhalt-Zerbst, Abbess of Gernrode and Frose, later Countess of Barby-Mühlingen (d. 1574)
- October 19 – John Juvenal Ancina, Italian oratorian and bishop (d. 1604)
- November 20 – Ernst Ludwig, Duke of Pomerania (d. 1592)
- November 25 – Ana de Jesús, Spanish Discalced Carmelite nun and spiritual writer (d. 1621)
- December 6 – Janus Dousa, Dutch historian and noble (d. 1604)
- December 7 – Henry Stuart, Lord Darnley, consort of Mary, Queen of Scots (d. 1567)
- date unknown
  - George Bannatyne, collector of Scottish poems (d. 1608)
  - John Field, British Puritan clergyman and controversialist (d. 1588)
  - John Gerard, English botanist (d. 1612)
  - Ismihan Sultan, Ottoman princess, daughter of Selim II and wife of Sokollu Mehmed Pasha (d. 1585)
  - William Morgan, Welsh Bible translator (d. 1604)
  - Azai Nagamasa, Japanese nobleman (d. 1573)
  - Mashita Nagamori, Japanese warlord (d. 1615)
- probable – Nicholas Breton, English poet and novelist (d. 1626)

1546

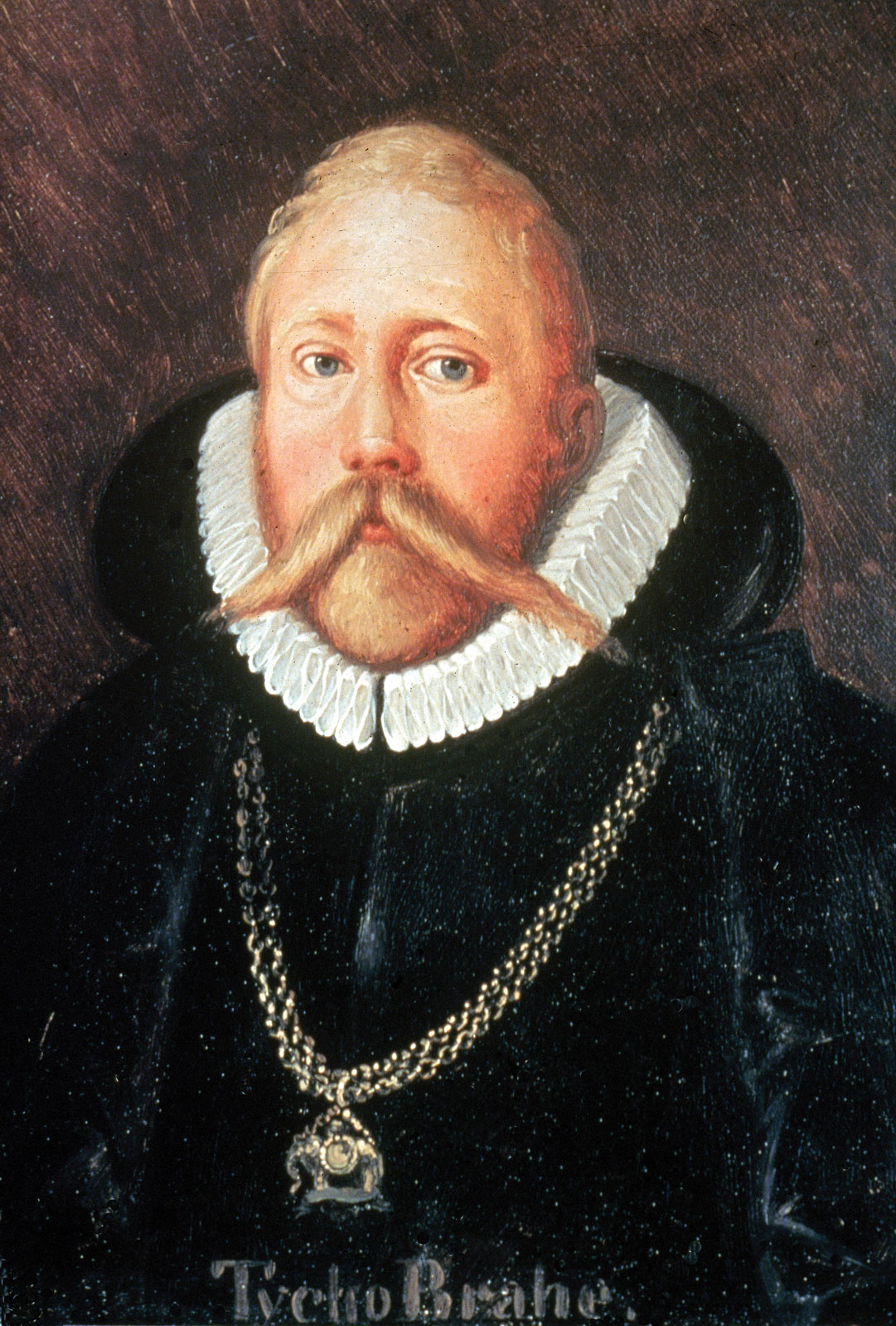
Tycho Brahe

- January 27 – Joachim Friedrich, Elector of Brandenburg (d. 1608)
- February 1 – Mogami Yoshiaki, Japanese daimyō of the Yamagata domain (d. 1614)
- February 4 – Jakob Monau, Polish writer and linguist (d. 1603)
- February 14 – Johann Pistorius, German historian (d. 1608)
- March 16 – Francesco Barbaro, Italian diplomat (d. 1616)
- March 21 – Bartholomeus Spranger, Flemish painter (d. 1611)
- March 25 – Giacomo Castelvetro, Italian writer (d. 1616)
- March 27 – Johannes Piscator, German theologian (d. 1625)
- March 29 – Anne d'Escars de Givry, French Catholic cardinal (d. 1612)
- April 1 – Nanbu Nobunao, Japanese daimyō (d. 1599)
- April 20 – Bernardo de Sandoval y Rojas, Spanish Catholic cardinal (d. 1618)
- June 13 – Tobias Matthew, English Archbishop of York (d. 1628)
- June 14 – Wolfgang, Count of Hohenlohe-Weikersheim, German count (d. 1610)
- June 24 – Robert Parsons, English Jesuit priest (d. 1610)
- June 29 – Dorothea of Denmark, Duchess of Brunswick-Lüneburg (1561-1592) (d. 1617)
- July 4 – Murat III, Ottoman Sultan (d. 1595)
- August 10 – Juliana of Nassau-Dillenburg, Dutch prince (d. 1588)
- August 13 – Jan Opaliński, Polish nobleman and Castellan of Rogozin (d. 1598)
- August 31 – Daniel Adam z Veleslavína, Czech lexicographer (d. 1599)
- September 6 – Pedro Álvarez de Toledo, 5th Marquis of Villafranca, Spanish noble and politician (d. 1627)
- September 11 – Arild Huitfeldt, Danish historian (d. 1609)
- September 13 – Isabella Bendidio, Italian singer and noble in Renaissance court of Ferrara (d. 1610)
- October 5 – Rudolph Snellius, Dutch linguist and mathematician (d. 1613)
- November 11 – Richard Madox, English explorer (d. 1583)
- December 14 – Tycho Brahe, Danish astronomer (d. 1601)
- date unknown
  - Luca Bati, Italian Baroque composer (d. 1608)
  - Thomas Digges, English astronomer (d. 1595)
  - Veronica Franco, Venetian poet and courtesan (died 1591)
  - Takeda Katsuyori, Japanese nobleman (d. 1582)
  - Mikołaj VII Radziwiłł, Polish magnate (d. 1565)
- probable – Lodewijk Elzevir, Dutch printer (d. 1617)

1547

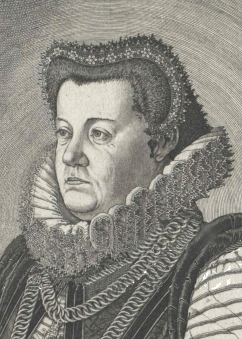
Duchess Hedwig of Württemberg

Joanna of Austria, Grand Duchess of Tuscany

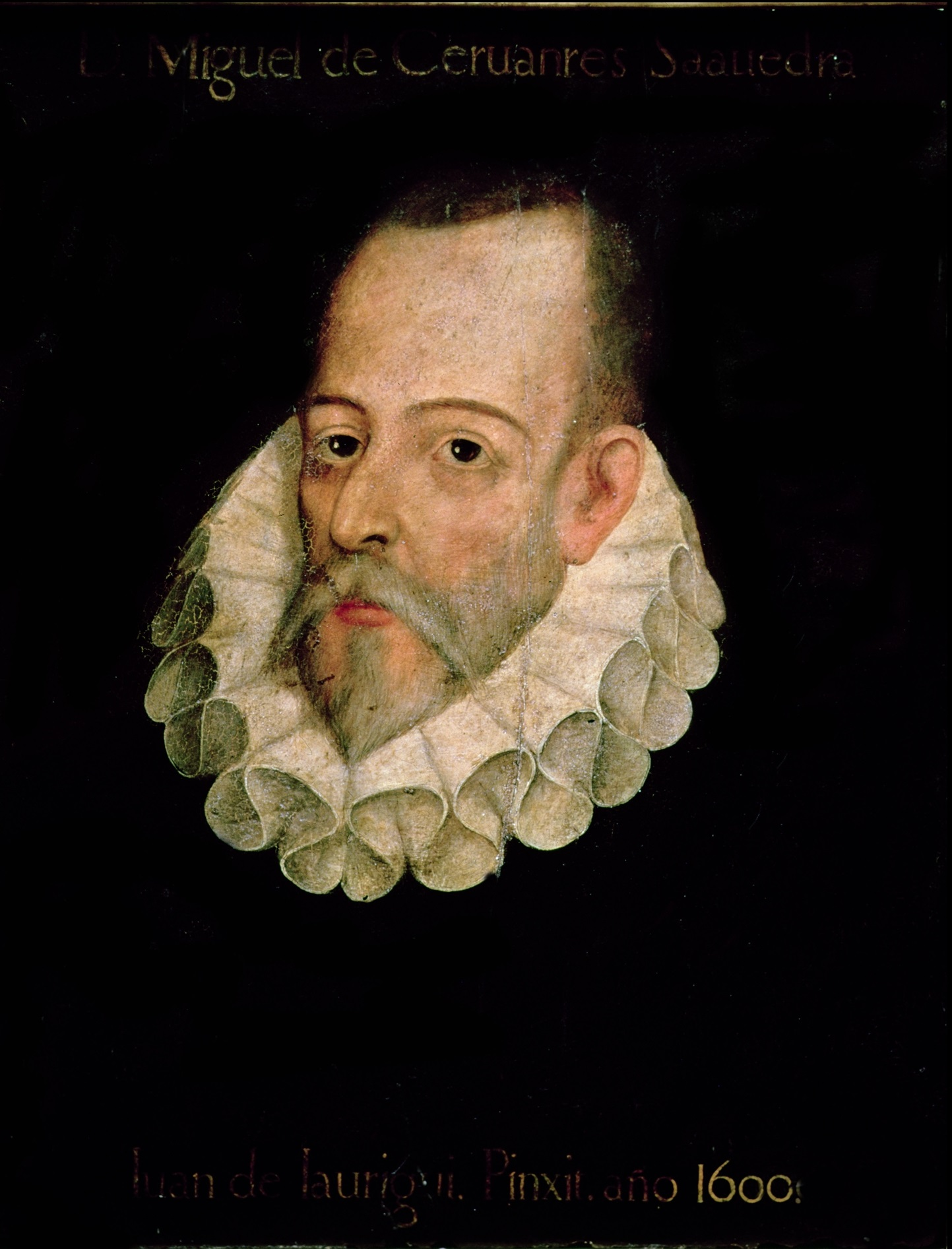
Miguel de Cervantes

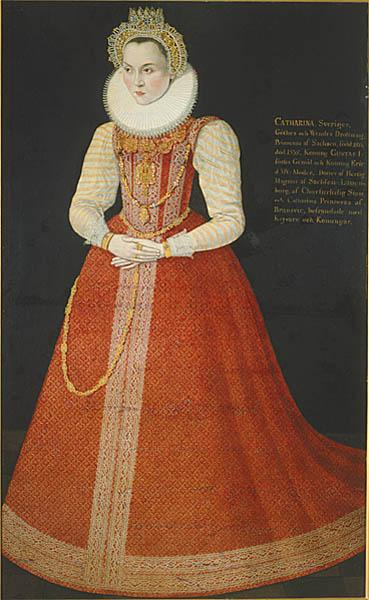
Princess Sophia of Sweden

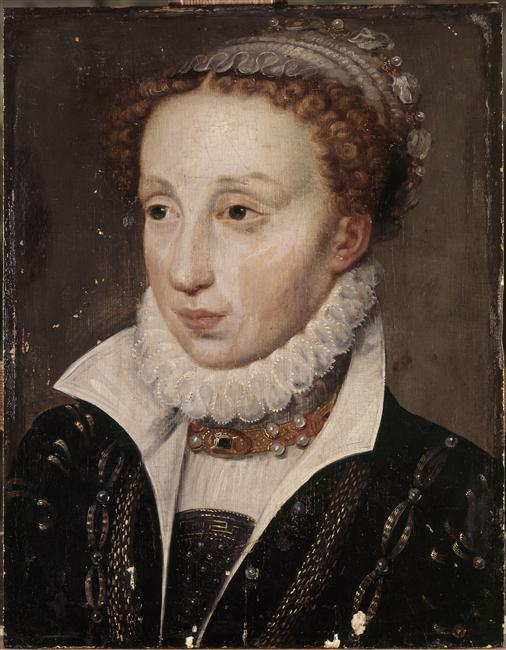
Claude of Valois

- January 15 – Duchess Hedwig of Württemberg, by marriage countess of Hesse-Marburg (d. 1590)
- January 20 – Laurence Bruce, Scottish politician (d. 1617)
- January 24 – Joanna of Austria, Grand Duchess of Tuscany, Austrian Archduchess (d. 1578)
- February 8 – Girolamo Mattei, Italian Catholic cardinal (d. 1603)
- February 18 – Bahāʾ al-dīn al-ʿĀmilī, Syrian Arab co-founder of the Isfahan School of Islamic Philosophy (d. 1621)
- February 24 – Don John of Austria, military leader (d. 1578)
- March 1 – Rudolph Goclenius, German philosopher (d. 1628)
- March 26 – Bernardino Bertolotti, Italian instrumentalist and composer (d. 1609)
- April 8 – Lucrezia Bendidio, noblewoman and singer in Renaissance Ferrara (d. 1584)
- May 15 – Magnus Pegel, German mathematician (d. 1619)
- May 19 – Gustaf Banér, Swedish nobleman and member of the Privy Council of Sweden (d. 1600)
- June 28 – Cristofano Malvezzi, Italian organist and composer (d. 1599)
- July 5 – Garzia de' Medici, Italian noble (d. 1562)
- August 10 – Francis II, Duke of Saxe-Lauenburg (d. 1619)
- September 10 – George I, Landgrave of Hesse-Darmstadt (d. 1596)
- September 14 – Johan van Oldenbarnevelt, Dutch statesman (d. 1619)
- September 20 – Faizi, Indo-Persian poet and scholar (d. 1595)
- September 22 – Philipp Nicodemus Frischlin, German philologist and poet (d. 1590)
- September 29 – Miguel de Cervantes, Spanish fiction writer (d. 1616)
- October 2 – Philipp Ludwig, Count Palatine of Neuburg (1569–1614) and Count Palatine of Sulzbach (1604–1614) (d. 1614)
- October 18 – Justus Lipsius, Flemish humanist (d. 1606)
- October 29 – Princess Sophia of Sweden, Swedish princess (d. 1611)
- November 7 – Rudolf Hospinian, Swiss writer (d. 1626)
- November 10
  - Martin Moller, German poet and mystic (d. 1606)
  - Gebhard Truchsess von Waldburg, Archbishop of Cologne (d. 1601)
- November 12 – Claude of Valois, daughter of King Henry II of France (d. 1575)
- November 26 – Nicolaus Taurellus, German philosopher and theologian (d. 1606)
- December 5 – Ubbo Emmius, Dutch historian and geographer (d. 1625)
- December 15 – Magdalena of Nassau-Dillenburg, German noblewoman (d. 1633)
- date unknown
  - Matteo Perez d'Aleccio, Italian painter (d. 1616)
  - Mateo Alemán, Spanish novelist and man of letters (d. 1609)
  - Peter Bales, English calligrapher (d. 1610)
  - Louis Carrion, Flemish humanist and classical scholar (d. 1595)
  - Oichi, Japanese noblewoman (d. 1583)
  - Krzysztof Mikołaj "the Thunderbolt" Radziwiłł, Polish nobleman (d. 1603)
  - Richard Stanihurst, English translator of Virgil (d. 1618)
  - Roemer Visscher, Dutch writer (d. 1620)
  - Stanisław Żółkiewski, Polish nobleman (d. 1620)

1548

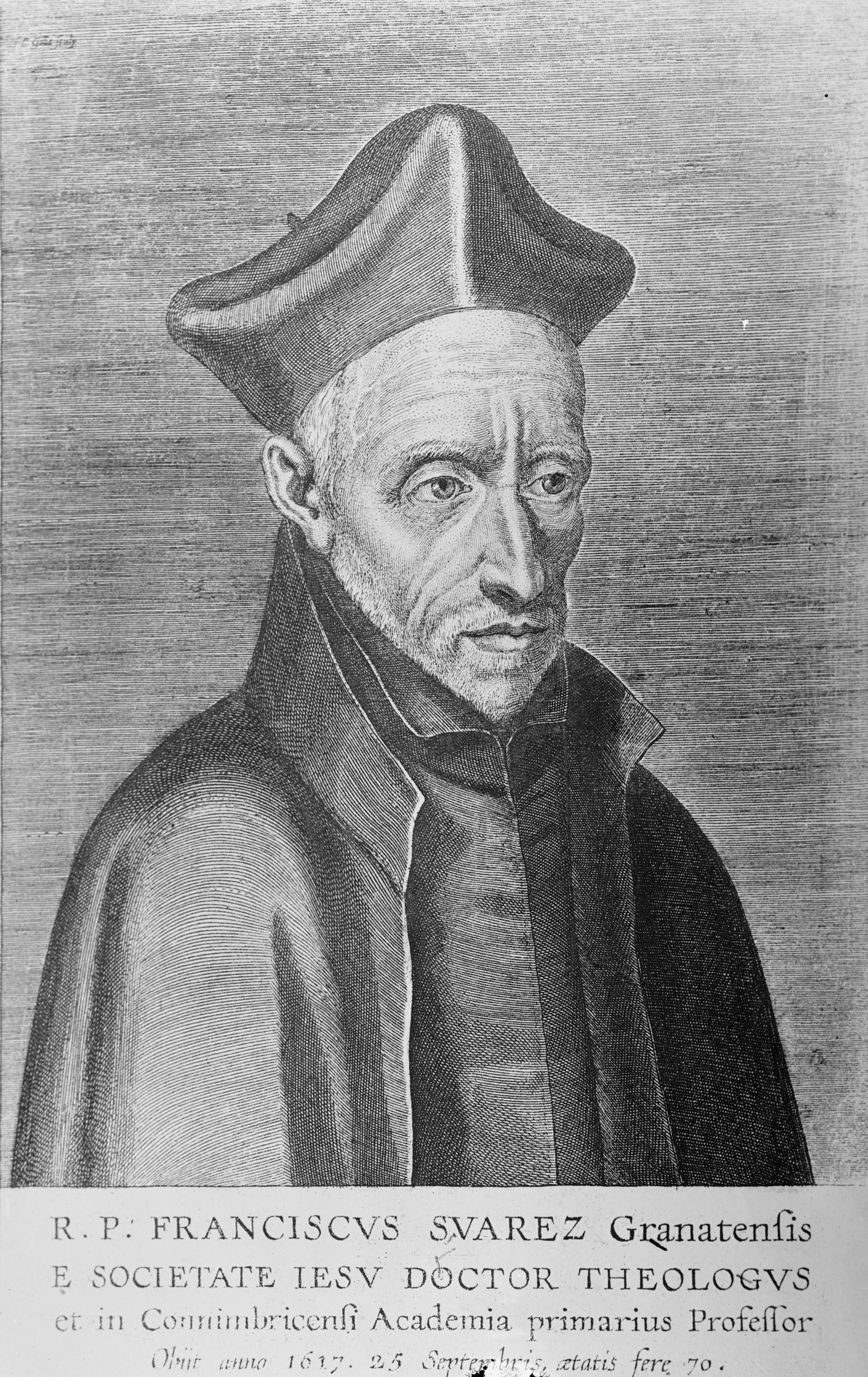
Francisco Suarez

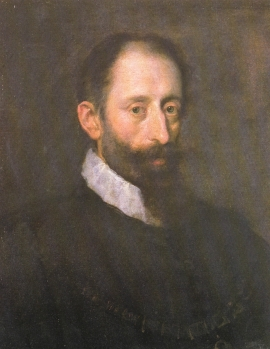
William V, Duke of Bavaria

- January 5 – Francisco Suárez, Spanish priest, philosopher, theologian and saint (d. 1617)
- February 6 – Francesco Panigarola, Italian bishop (d. 1594)
- March 13 – Sasbout Vosmeer, Dutch Apostolic Vicar (d. 1614)
- March 17 – Honda Tadakatsu, Japanese general (d. 1610)
- March 18 – Cornelis Ketel, Dutch painter (d. 1616)
- April 15 – Pietro Cataldi, Italian mathematician (d. 1626)
- May – Carel van Mander, Dutch painter and poet (d. 1606)
- May 8 – Giacomo Boncompagni, illegitimate son of Pope Gregory XIII (d. 1612)
- May 10 – Antonio Priuli, Doge of Venice (d. 1623)
- July 8 – Kim Jang-saeng, Korean scholar and writer (d. 1631)
- July 15 – George III, Count of Erbach-Breuberg (1564–1605) (d. 1605)
- August 26 – Bernardino Poccetti, Italian painter (d. 1612)
- September 2 – Vincenzo Scamozzi, Italian architect (d. 1616)
- September 7 – Filippo Boncompagni, Italian Catholic cardinal (d. 1586)
- September 29 – William V, Duke of Bavaria (d. 1626)
- October 4 – Matsumae Yoshihiro, Japanese daimyō of Ezochi (Hokkaidō) (d. 1616)
- November 27 – Jacopo Mazzoni, Italian philosopher (d. 1598)
- December 30 – David Pareus, German theologian (d. 1622)
- approx. date – Ma Shouzhen, Chinese Gējì, painter, playwright and poet (d. 1604)
- date unknown
  - Giordano Bruno, Italian philosopher, astronomer, and occultist (d. 1600)
  - Oda Nagamasu, Japanese nobleman (d. 1622)
  - Luis Barahona de Soto, Spanish poet (d. 1595)
  - William Stanley, English soldier (d. 1630)
  - Saitō Tatsuoki, Japanese daimyō (d. 1573)
  - Sidonia von Borcke, German noble and alleged witch (d. 1620)
  - Tomás Luis de Victoria, Spanish composer (d. 1611)
  - Fernando Ruiz de Castro Andrade y Portugal, Grandee of Spain (d. 1601)
- probable
  - Francesco Andreini, Italian actor (d. 1624)
  - Francesco Soriano, Italian composer (d. 1621)
  - Mariangiola Criscuolo, Italian painter (d. 1630)
  - Simon Stevin, Flemish mathematician and engineer (d. 1620)

1549

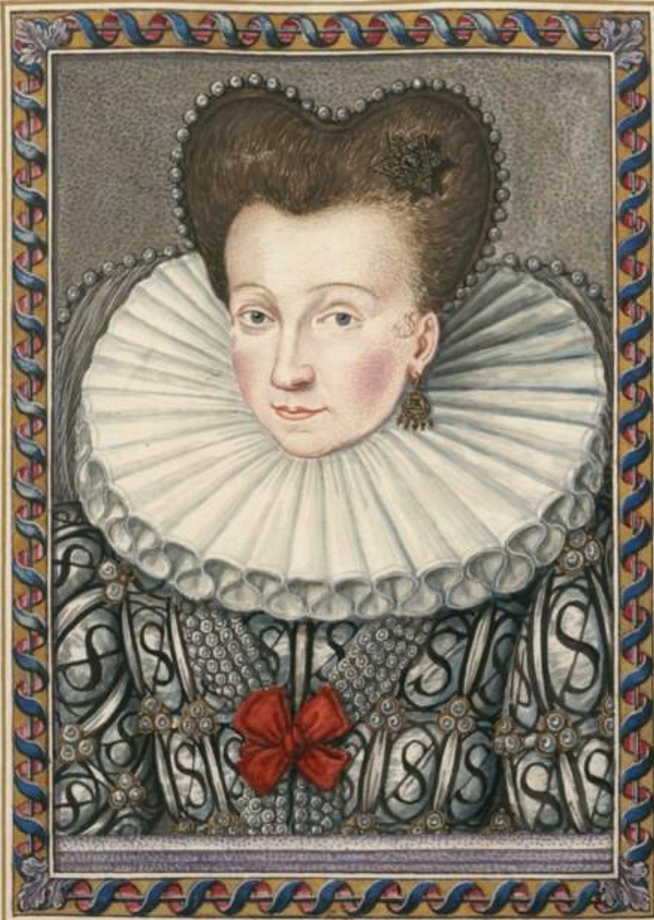
Françoise d'Orléans-Longueville

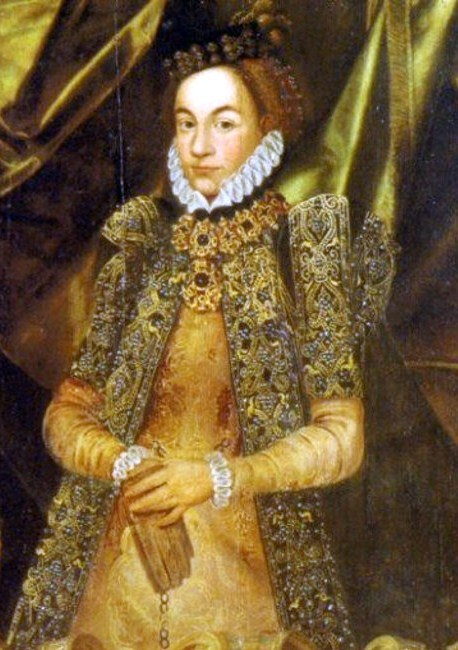
Duchess Sabine of Württemberg

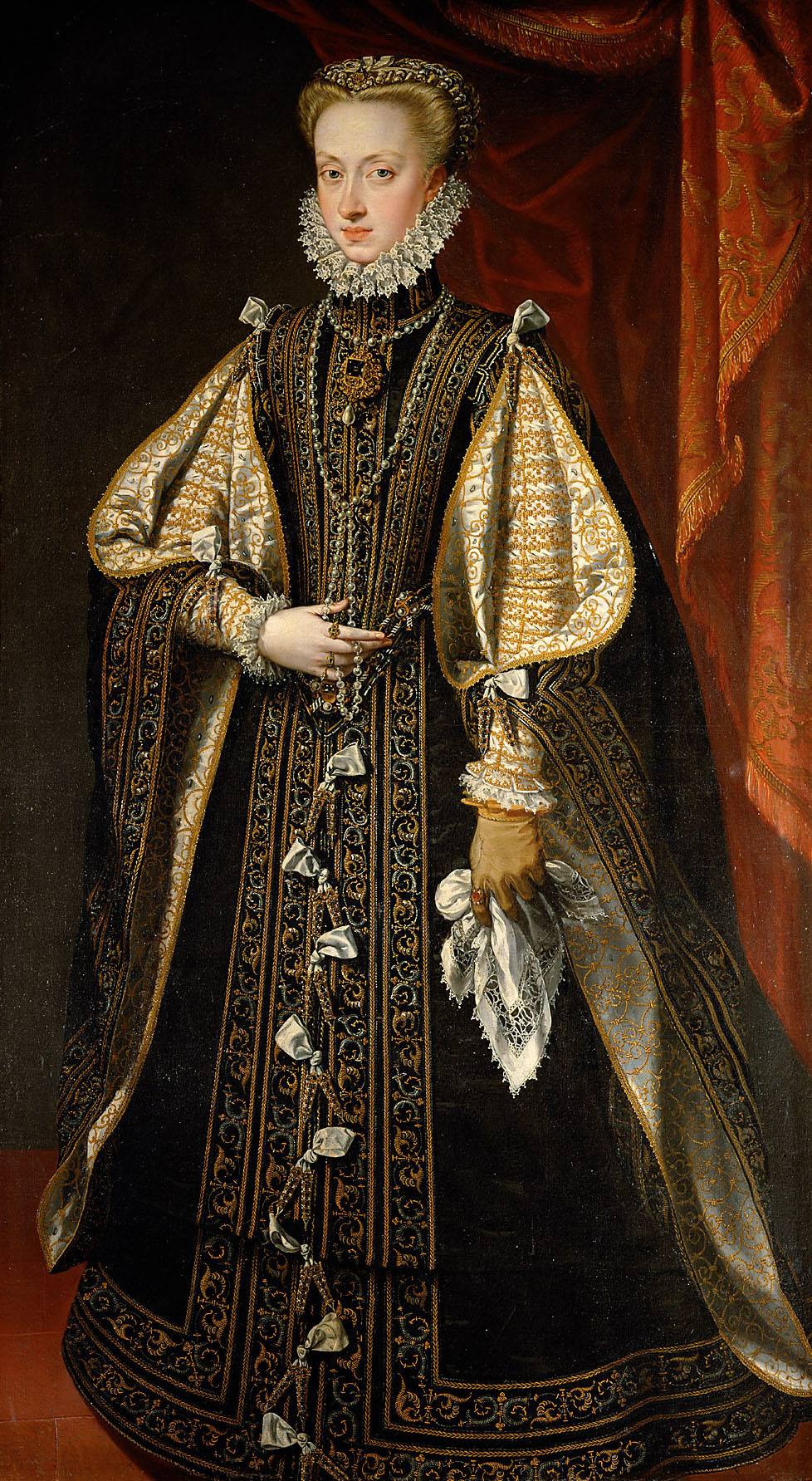
Anne of Austria, Queen of Spain

- January 26 – Jakob Ebert, German theologian (d. 1614)
- January 26 – Francesco Bassano the Younger, Italian painter (d. 1592)
- February 3 – Louis of Valois, French prince (d. 1550)
- February 4 – Eustache Du Caurroy, French composer (d. 1609)
- February 15 – Barnim X, Duke of Pomerania (1569–1603) (d. 1603)
- February 20 – Francesco Maria II della Rovere, Duke of Urbino, last Duke of Urbino (d. 1631)
- March 10 – Francis Solanus, Spanish missionary and saint (d. 1610)
- March 11 – Hendrik Laurenszoon Spiegel, Dutch writer (d. 1612)
- April 5 – Françoise d'Orléans-Longueville, French princess (d. 1601)
- April 13 – Count Juraj IV Zrinski of Croatia (d. 1603)
- June 15 – Elizabeth Knollys, English noblewoman (d. 1605)
- July 2 – Duchess Sabine of Württemberg, by marriage Landgravine of Hesse-Kassel (d. 1581)
- July 5 – Francesco Maria del Monte, Italian Catholic cardinal (d. 1627)
- July 12 – Edward Manners, 3rd Earl of Rutland (d. 1587)
- July 20 – Pierre de Larivey, Italian-born French dramatist (d. 1619)
- July 30 – Ferdinando I de' Medici, Grand Duke of Tuscany (d. 1609)
- August 2 – Mikołaj Krzysztof "the Orphan" Radziwiłł, Polish nobleman (d. 1616)
- August 10 – Catherine of Brandenburg-Küstrin, daughter of Margrave John of Küstrin (d. 1602)
- September 1 – Charles Philippe de Croÿ, Marquis d’Havré, Belgian noble and politician (d. 1613)
- November 2 – Anna of Austria, Queen of Spain (d. 1580)
- November 5 – Philippe de Mornay, French writer (d. 1623)
- November 30 – Sir Henry Savile, English educator (d. 1622)
- December 9 – Costanzo Antegnati, Italian composer, organist (d. 1624)
- December 20 – John Petre, 1st Baron Petre, English politician and baron (d. 1613)
- December 24 – Kaspar Ulenberg, German theologian (d. 1617)
- date unknown
  - Kutsuki Mototsuna, Japanese military commander (d. 1632)
  - John Rainolds, English scholar and Bible translator (d. 1607)
  - Juan de Salcedo, Spanish conquistador (d. 1576)
  - Marek Sobieski, Polish noble (d. 1605)
  - Ogawa Suketada, Japanese warlord (d. 1601)

== Deaths ==
1540

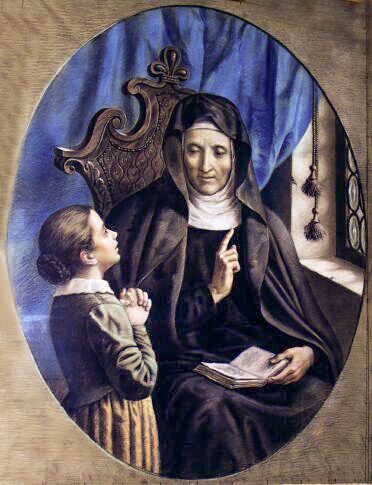
Angela Merici

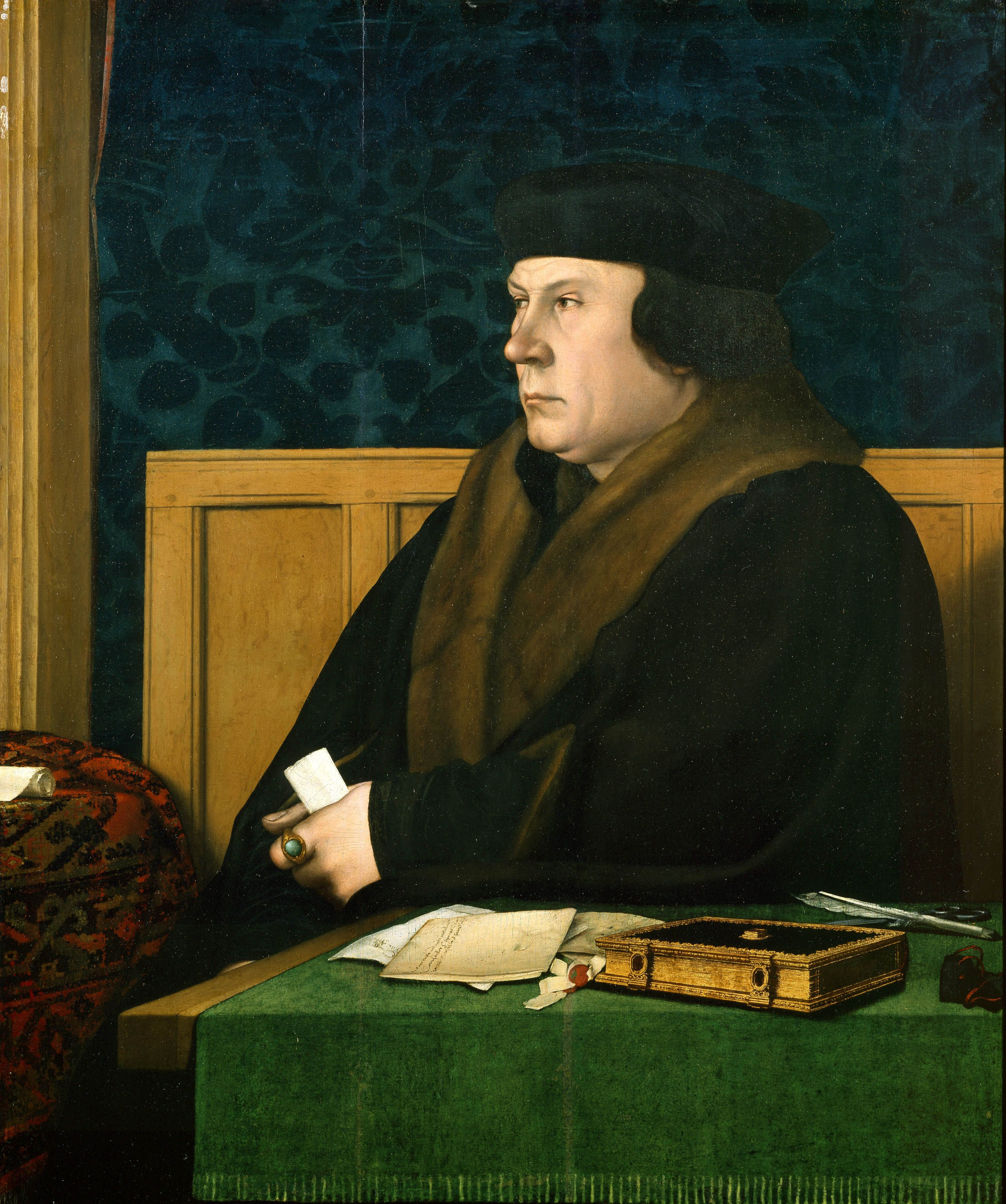
Thomas Cromwell

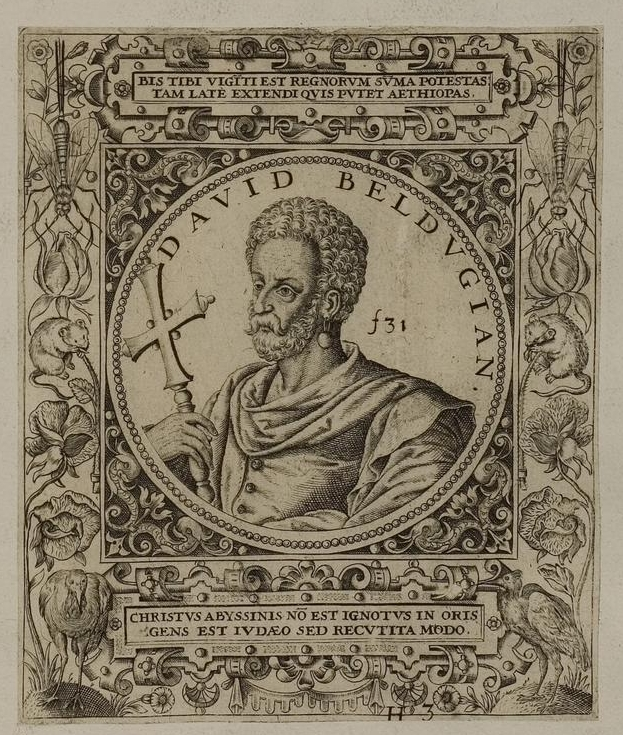
Lebna Dengel

- c. January – Elizabeth Blount, mistress of Henry VIII of England (b. 1502)
- January 27 – Angela Merici, Italian religious leader and saint (b. 1474)
- March 30 – Matthäus Lang von Wellenburg, German statesman and archbishop of Salzburg (b. 1469)
- April 21 – Afonso of Portugal, Catholic cardinal (b. 1509)
- May 6 – Juan Luís Vives, Spanish scholar (b. 1492)
- May 22 – Francesco Guicciardini, Italian statesman and historian (b. 1483)
- June 16 – Konrad von Thüngen, German noble (b. c. 1466)
- July 22 – John Zápolya, King of Hungary (b. c. 1490)
- July 28 – Thomas Cromwell, 1st Earl of Essex, English statesman (executed) (b. c.1485)
- July 30
  - Thomas Abel, English priest (martyred) (b. c. 1497)
  - Robert Barnes, English reformer (martyred) (b. 1495)
  - Eric I, Duke of Brunswick-Lüneburg, Prince of Calenberg (1491–1540) (b. 1470)
- August 23 – Guillaume Budé, French scholar (b. 1467)
- August 24 – Girolamo Francesco Maria Mazzola (Parmigianino), Italian artist (b. 1503)
- August 28 – Federico II Gonzaga, Duke of Mantua (b. 1500)
- September 2 – Lebna Dengel, Emperor of Ethiopia (in battle) (b. 1501)
- September 16 – Enrique de Borja y Aragón, Spanish noble of the House of Borgia (b. 1518)
- September 20 – Infante Duarte, Duke of Guimarães, son of King Manuel I of Portugal (b. 1515)
- October 5 – Helius Eobanus Hessus, German Latin poet (b. 1488)
- date unknown – Francisco de Ulloa, Spanish explorer
- probable
  - Tristão da Cunha, Portuguese explorer (b. 1460)
  - Johann Georg Faust, German alchemist (b. 1480)

1541

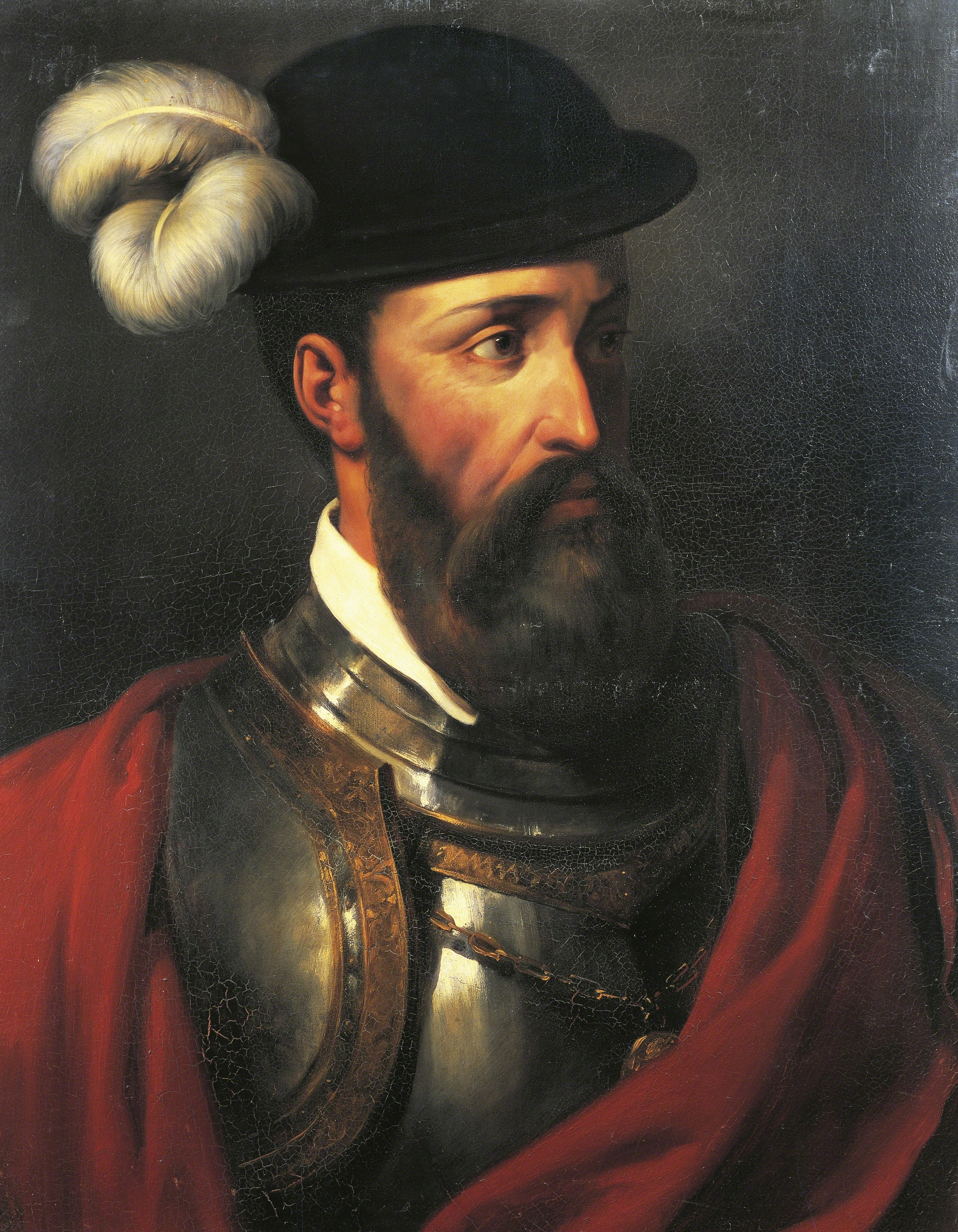
Francisco Pizarro

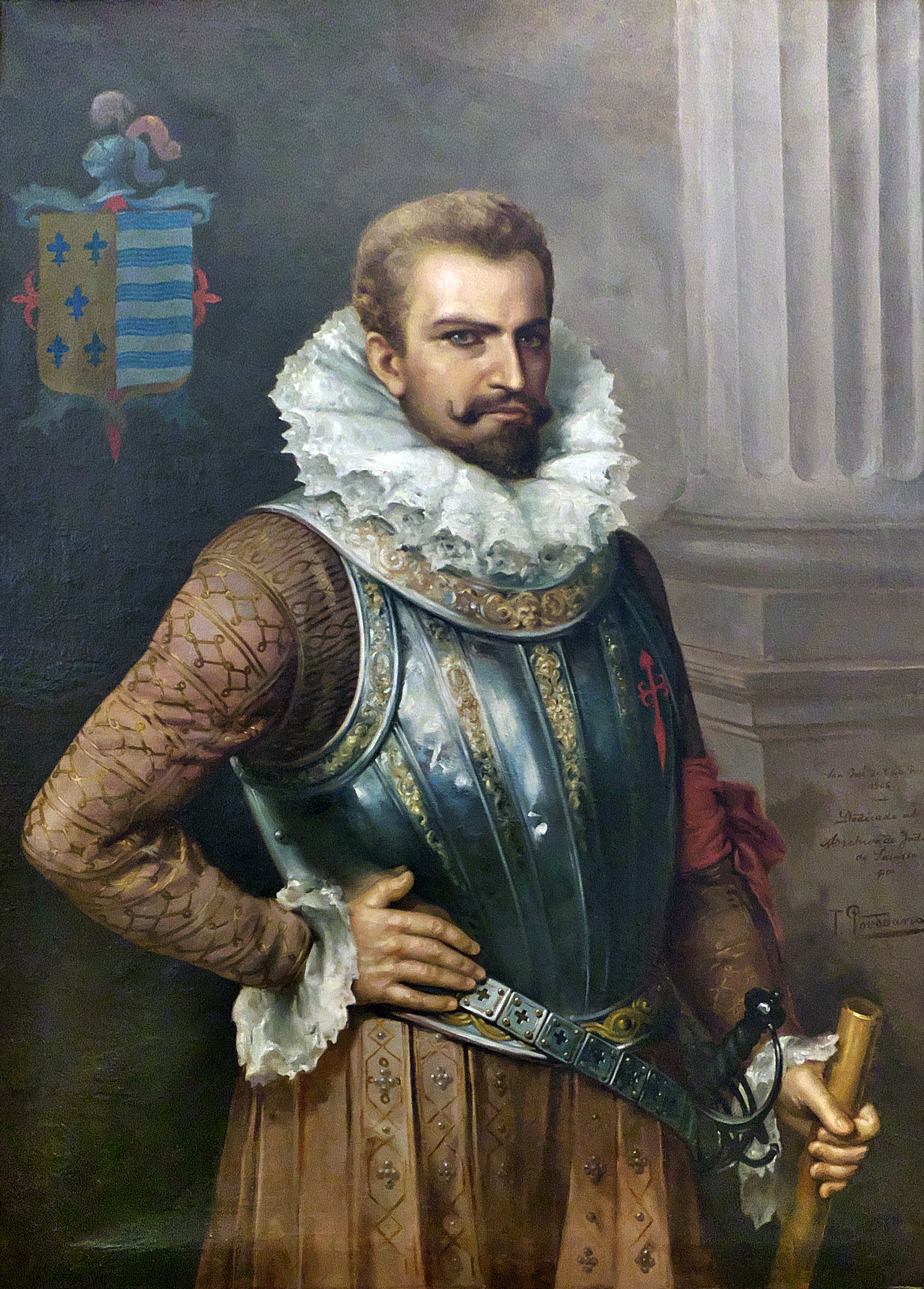
Pedro de Alvarado

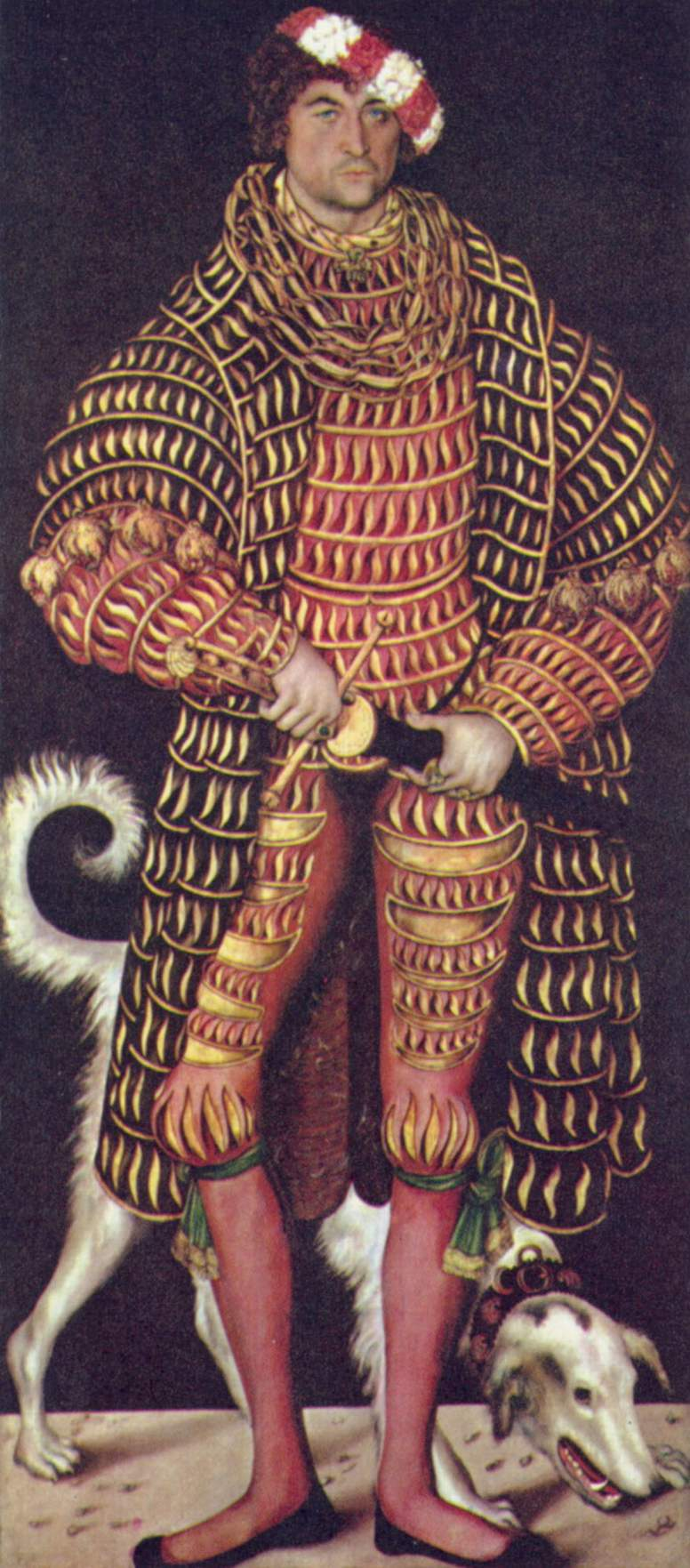
Henry IV, Duke of Saxony

- January 2 – Wang Gen, Chinese philosopher (b. 1483)
- January 5 – Philip of the Palatinate, Bishop of Freising and Naumburg (b. 1480)
- April – Jerzy Radziwiłł, Polish nobleman (b. 1480)
- April 21 – James, Duke of Rothesay, Scottish prince (b. 1540)
- April 24 – Celio Calcagnini, Italian astronomer (b. 1479)
- April 29 – Johann Gramann, German theologian (b. 1487)
- May 27 – Margaret Pole, 8th Countess of Salisbury (executed) (b. 1473)
- June 26 – Francisco Pizarro, Spanish conquistador (b. c. 1475)
- July 4 – Pedro de Alvarado, Spanish conquistador (b. 1495)
- August – Juan de Valdés, Spanish religious writer (b. 1500)
- August 1 – Simon Grynaeus, German scholar and theologian (b. 1493)
- August 18 – Henry IV, Duke of Saxony (1539–1541) (b. 1473)
- August 19 – Vincenzo Cappello, Venetian admiral and statesman (b. 1469)
- September 24 – Paracelsus, Swiss alchemist and physician (b. 1493)
- September – Beatriz de la Cueva, Governor of Guatemala (b. 1510)
- October 18 – Margaret Tudor, queen of James IV of Scotland (b. 1489)
- November 4 – Wolfgang Fabricius Capito, German reformer (b. 1478)
- November 30 – Amago Tsunehisa, Japanese warlord (b. 1458)
- December 10
  - Thomas Culpeper, English courtier, lover of Catherine Howard (b. c. 1514)
  - Francis Dereham, English lover of Catherine Howard (executed)
- December 24 – Andreas Karlstadt, Christian theologian and reformer (b. 1486)
- date unknown
  - Jean Clouet, French miniature painter (b. 1480)
  - Margareta von Melen, Swedish noblewoman (b. 1489)
  - Gül Baba, Ottoman dervish poet
  - Giovanni Guidiccioni, Italian poet (b. 1480)
  - Gazi Husrev-beg, Ottoman statesmen (b. 1480)

1542

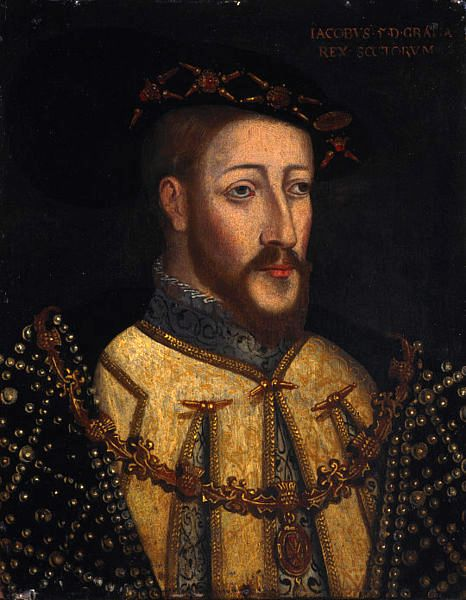
James V of Scotland

- January 21 – Azai Sukemasa, Japanese samurai and warlord (b. 1491)
- February – Nikolaus Federmann, German adventurer in Venezuela and Colombia (b. 1501)
- February 1 – Girolamo Aleandro, Italian cardinal (b. 1480)
- February 13
  - Catherine Howard, fifth queen of Henry VIII of England (executed) (born c. 1522)
  - Jane Boleyn, Viscountess Rochford, English noblewoman (executed) (born c. 1505)
- March 3 – Arthur Plantagenet, 1st Viscount Lisle, illegitimate son of King Edward IV of England
- May 21 – Hernando de Soto, Spanish explorer, navigator and conquistador (b. c. 1500)
- June 14 – Christoph von Scheurl, German writer (b. 1481)
- June 19 – Leo Jud, Swiss reformer (b. 1482)
- July 15 – Lisa del Giocondo, Florentine noblewoman, believed to be the subject of the Mona Lisa (b. 1479)
- August 24 – Gasparo Contarini, Italian diplomat and cardinal (b. 1483)
- August 29 – Cristóvão da Gama, Portuguese soldier (b. c. 1516)
- September 17 – Lucas Fernández, Spanish dramatist and musician (b. c. 1474)
- September 21 – Juan Boscán Almogáver, Spanish poet (b. c. 1490)
- October 11 – Thomas Wyatt, English poet and diplomat (b. 1503)
- October 18 – Giovanni Gaddi, Italian priest (b. 1493)
- December 14 – King James V of Scotland (b. 1512)
- December 16 – Thomas Lovett III, High Sheriff of Northamptonshire (b. 1473)
- date unknown
  - Dosso Dossi, Italian painter (b. 1490)
  - Lapulapu, Filipino king (b. 1491)

1543

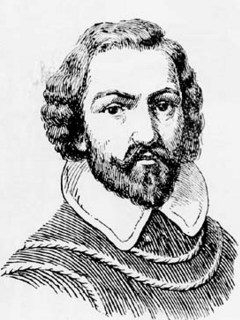
Juan Rodríguez Cabrillo

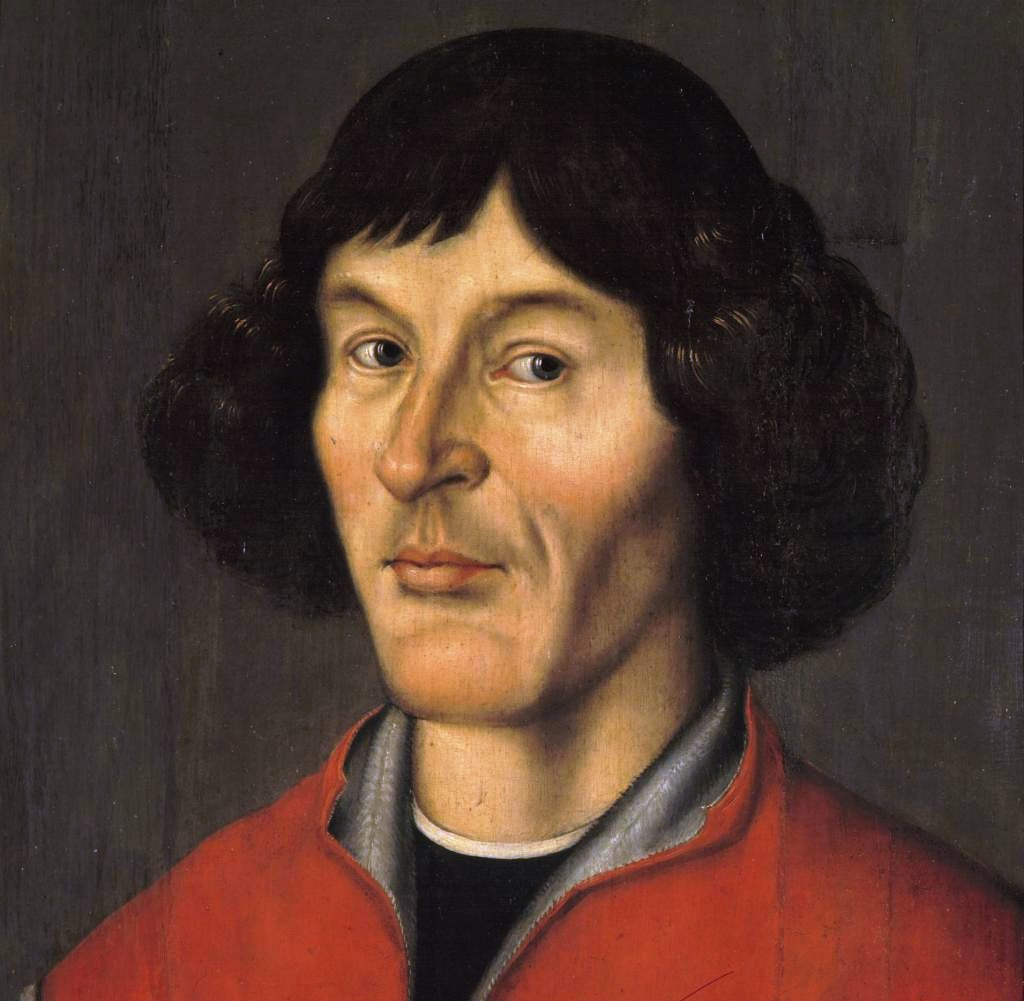
Nicolaus Copernicus

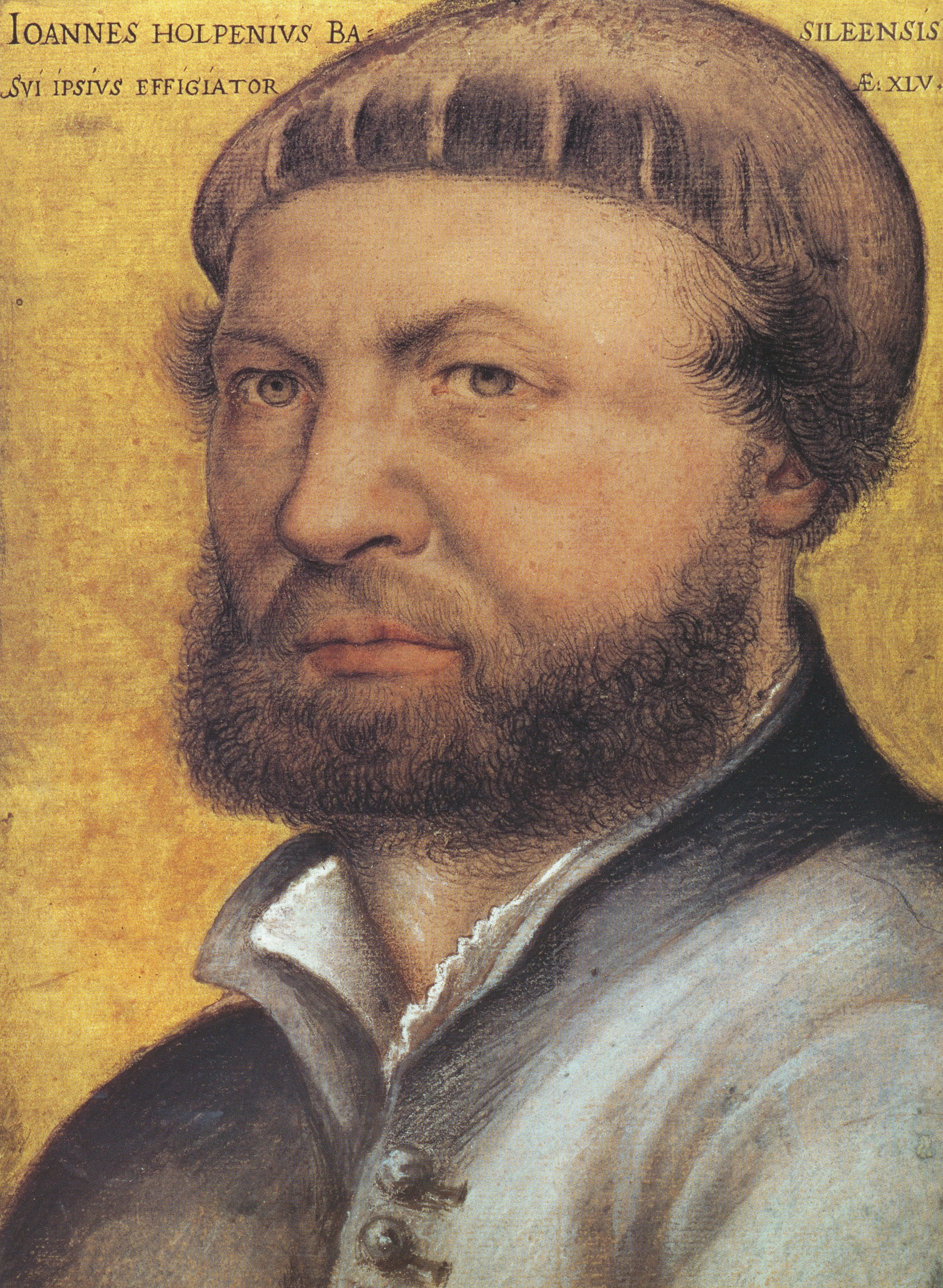
Hans Holbein the Younger

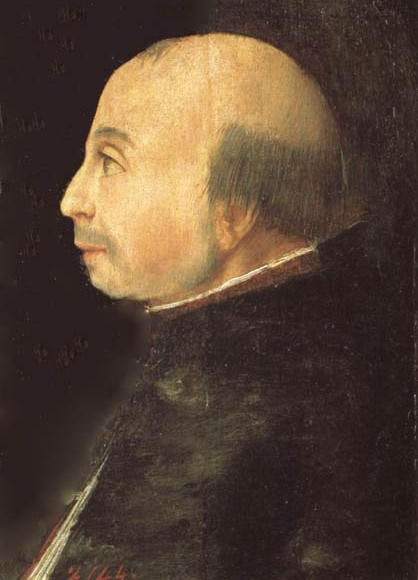
Gian Matteo Giberti

- January 2 – Francesco Canova da Milano, Italian composer (b. 1497)
- January 3 – Juan Rodríguez Cabrillo, Portuguese explorer (b. 1499)
- January 9 – Guillaume du Bellay, French diplomat and general (b. 1491)
- February 13 – Johann Eck, German Scholastic theologian (b. 1486)
- February 21 – Ahmad ibn Ibrahim al-Ghazi, Imam of Adal (in battle) (b. c. 1506)
- March 2 – John Neville, 3rd Baron Latimer, English politician (b. 1493)
- March 6 – Baccio D'Agnolo, Florentine woodcarver (b. 1460)
- April 23 – Susanna of Bavaria, German noble, House of Wittelsbach (b. 1502)
- May 24 – Nicolaus Copernicus, Polish mathematician and astronomer (b. 1473)
- June 27 – Agnolo Firenzuola, Italian poet (b. 1493)
- July 19 – Mary Boleyn, English courtier, mistress of Kings Francis I of France and Henry VIII of England (b. 1500)
- August 1 – Magnus I, Duke of Saxe-Lauenburg, German noble (b. 1470)
- August 29 – Maria of Jülich-Berg, German duchess, Spouse of John III, Duke of Cleves (b. 1491)
- September 2 – Sultan Quli Qutb Mulk, founder of the Qutb Shahi dynasty of Golconda (b. 1470)
- September 20 – Thomas Manners, 1st Earl of Rutland (b. 1492)
- September 23 – Johanna of Hachberg-Sausenberg, countess regnant of Neuchatel (b. 1485)
- November 29 – Hans Holbein the Younger, German artist, active in England
- December 27 – George, Margrave of Brandenburg-Ansbach (b. 1484)
- December 29 – Maria Salviati, Italian noble (b. 1499)
- December 30 – Gian Matteo Giberti, Italian Catholic bishop (b. 1495)
- date unknown
  - Polidoro da Caravaggio, Italian painter (b. 1492; murdered)
  - Madeleine Lartessuti, French shipper and banker (b. 1478)
  - Al-Mutawakkil III, last caliph of the Cairo-based Abbasid caliphate
  - Sehzade Mehmed, Ottoman prince (b. 1521)
- probable
  - Sebastian Franck, German freethinker (b. 1515)
  - Margaret Lee, English courtier, sister of poet Thomas Wyatt (b. 1506)

1544

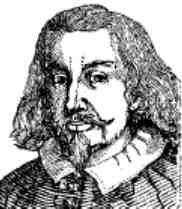
Johannes Magnus

- March 16 – Louis V, Elector Palatine (1508–1544) (b. 1478)
- March 22 – Johannes Magnus, last Catholic Archbishop of Sweden (b. 1488)
- April 30 – Thomas Audley, Lord Chancellor of England (b. 1488)
- June 14 – Antoine, Duke of Lorraine (b. 1489)
- July 15 – René of Châlon, Prince of the House of Orange (b. 1519)
- June 23 – Eleonore of Fürstenberg, wife of Philip IV, Count of Hanau-Lichtenberg (b. 1523)
- August 19 – Hans Buser, Swiss noble (b. 1513)
- September 12 – Clément Marot, French poet (b. 1496)
- September 25 – Valerius Cordus, German physician and scientist (b. 1515)
- October 10 – Charles Blount, 5th Baron Mountjoy, English courtier and patron of learning (b. 1516)
- October 12 – Antonio Pucci, Italian Catholic cardinal (b. 1485)
- November 13 – Ursula van Beckum, Dutch Anapabtist (b. 1520)
- November 15 – Lucy Brocadelli, Dominican tertiary and stigmatic (b. 1476)
- November 29 – Jungjong of Joseon (b. 1488)
- December 9 – Teofilo Folengo, Italian poet (b. 1491)
- date unknown
  - Ulick na gCeann Burke, 1st Earl of Clanricarde
  - Chen Chun, Chinese painter (b. 1483)
  - Margaret Roper, English writer (b. 1505)
  - Nilakantha Somayaji, Indian mathematician and astronomer (b. 1444)
  - Manco Inca Yupanqui, Inca ruler (b. 1516)
  - Bonaventure des Périers, French author (b. 1500)

1545

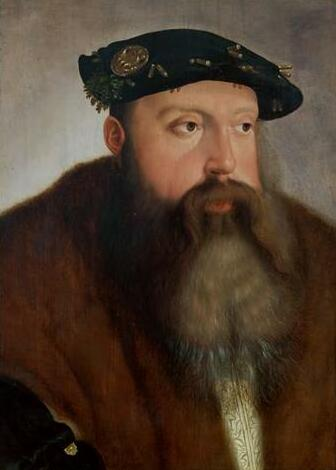
Louis X, Duke of Bavaria

- January 16 – George Spalatin, German reformer (b. 1484)
- February 12 or April 2 – Stanisław Odrowąż, Polish noble (b. 1509)
- April 3 – Antonio de Guevara, Spanish chronicler and moralist (b. 1481)
- April 10 – Costanzo Festa, Italian composer (b. 1495)
- April 22 – Louis X, Duke of Bavaria (b. 1496)
- April 25 – Jobst II, Count of Hoya (b. 1493)
- May – Agnes Howard, Duchess of Norfolk, English noblewoman (b. c. 1477)
- May 22 – Sher Shah Suri, Indian ruler (b. 1486)
- June 4 – John Louis, Count of Nassau-Saarbrücken (1472–1545) (b. 1472)
- June 12 – Francis I, Duke of Lorraine (b. 1517)
- June 15 – Elizabeth of Austria, Polish noble (b. 1526)
- July 7 – Pernette Du Guillet, French poet (b. c. 1520)
- July 12 – Maria Manuela, Princess of Portugal (b. 1527)
- August 8 – Injong of Joseon, 12th king of the Joseon dynasty of Korea (b. 1515)
- August 22 – Charles Brandon, 1st Duke of Suffolk, English politician and husband of Mary Tudor (b. c. 1484)
- August 27 – Piotr Gamrat, Polish Catholic archbishop (b. 1487)
- September
  - Hans Baldung, German artist (b. 1480)
  - Hkonmaing, king of the Ava kingdom (b. c. 1497)
- September 1 – Francis de Bourbon, Count of St. Pol, French noble (b. 1491)
- September 9 – Charles II de Valois, Duke of Orléans, (b. 1522)
- September 24 – Albert of Mainz, elector and archbishop of Mainz (b. 1490)
- October 18 – John Taverner, English composer (b. c. 1490)
- date unknown
  - William Latimer, English churchman and scholar (b. c. 1467)
  - Fernão Lopez, Portuguese renegade
  - Vicente Masip, Spanish painter (b. 1506)

1546

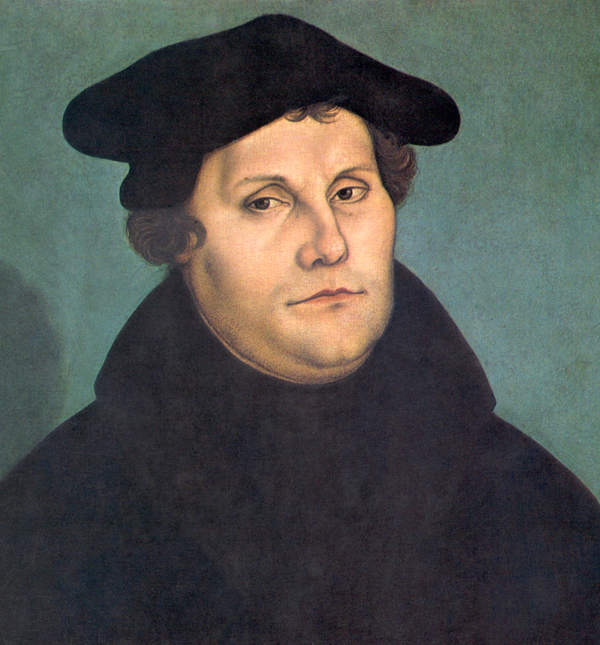
Martin Luther

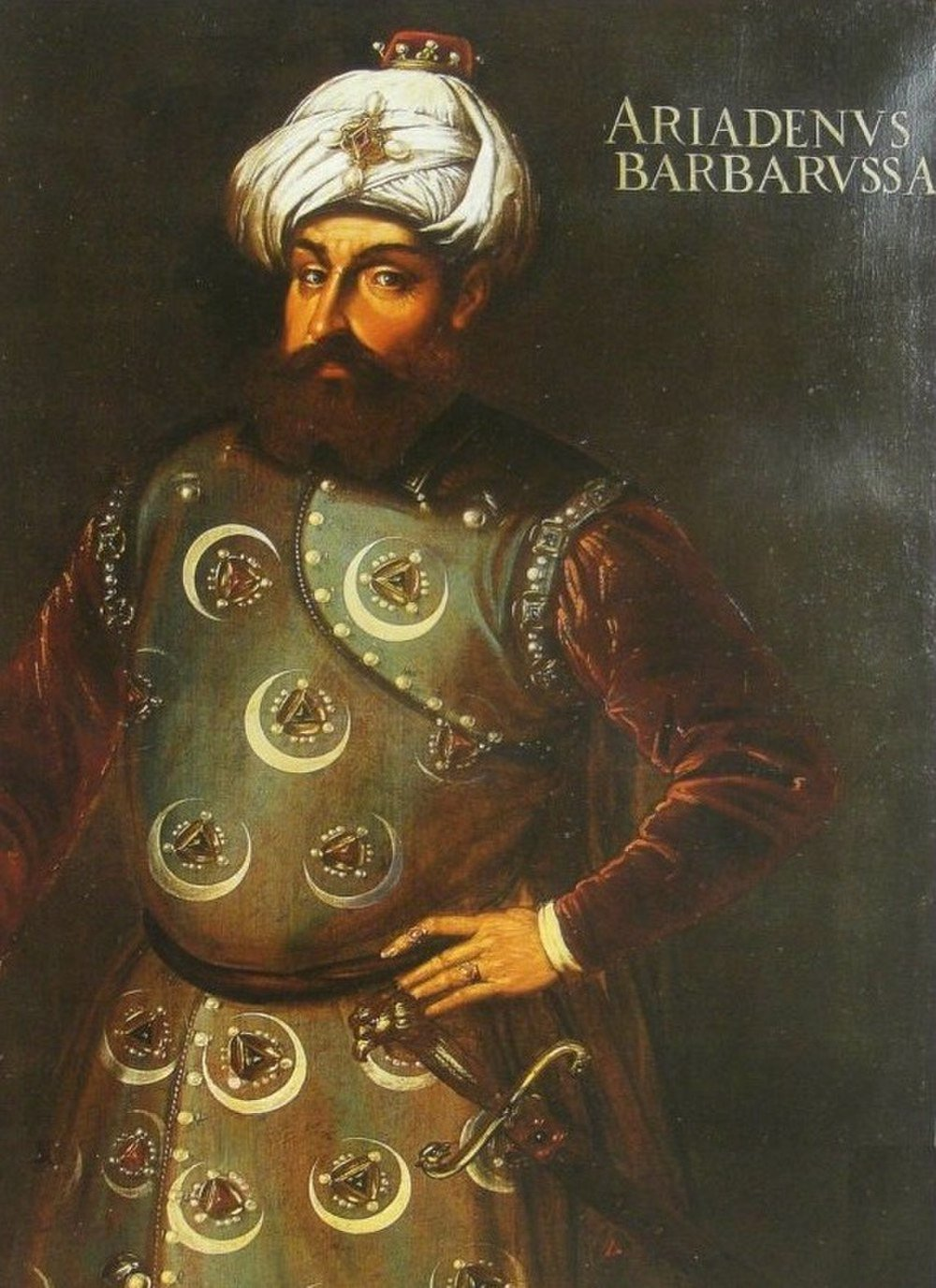
Hayreddin Barbarossa

- January 11
  - Ernest I, Duke of Brunswick-Lüneburg (b. 1497)
  - Gaudenzio Ferrari, Italian painter and sculptor (b. c. 1471)
- January 21 – Azai Sukemasa, daimyō (b. 1491)
- February 18 – Martin Luther, German religious reformer (b. 1483)
- February 23 – Francis, Count of Enghien, French military leader (b. 1519)
- March 1 – George Wishart, Scottish religious reformer (martyred) (b. 1513)
- March 26 – Thomas Elyot, English diplomat and scholar (b. c. 1490)
- April 7 – Friedrich Myconius, German Lutheran theologian (b. 1491)
- May 17 – Philipp von Hutten, German explorer (b. 1511)
- May 28 – Ottaviano de' Medici, Italian politician (b. 1484)
- May 29 – David Beaton, Scottish Catholic cardinal (assassinated) (b. c. 1494)
- June 13 – Fridolin Sicher, Swiss composer (b. 1490)
- July 4 – Khair ad Din "Barbarossa", corsair ruler of Algiers (b. 1475)
- July 9 – Robert Maxwell, 5th Lord Maxwell, Scottish statesman (b. c. 1493)
- July 16 – Anne Askew, English Protestant (burned at the stake) (b. 1521)
- August 1 – Peter Faber, French Jesuit theologian (b. 1506)
- August 3
  - Étienne Dolet, French scholar and printer (b. 1509)
  - Antonio da Sangallo the Younger, Italian architect (b. 1484)
- August 12 – Francisco de Vitoria, Renaissance theologian (b. 1492)
- November 1 – Giulio Romano, Italian painter (b. 1499)

1547

King Henry VIII of England

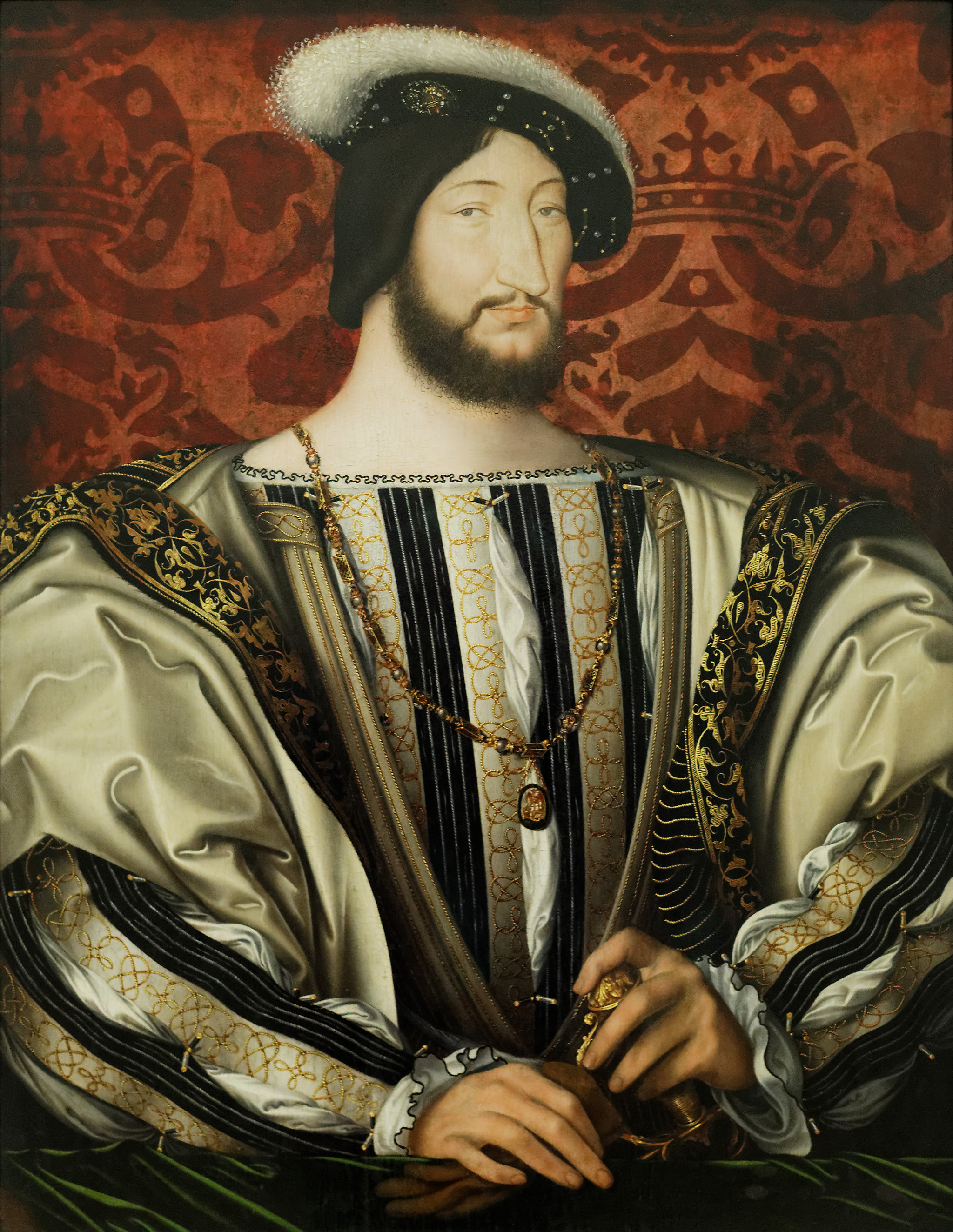
King Francis I of France

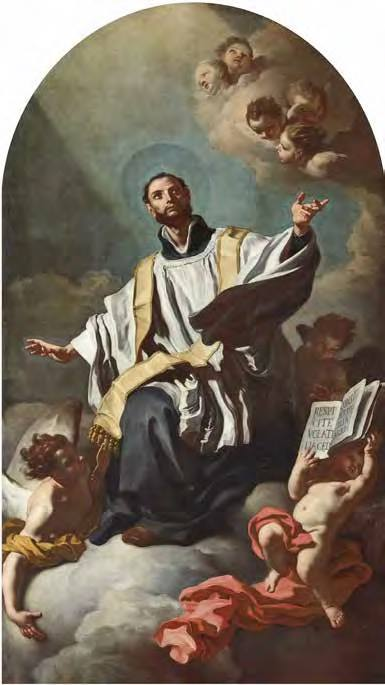
Saint Cajetan

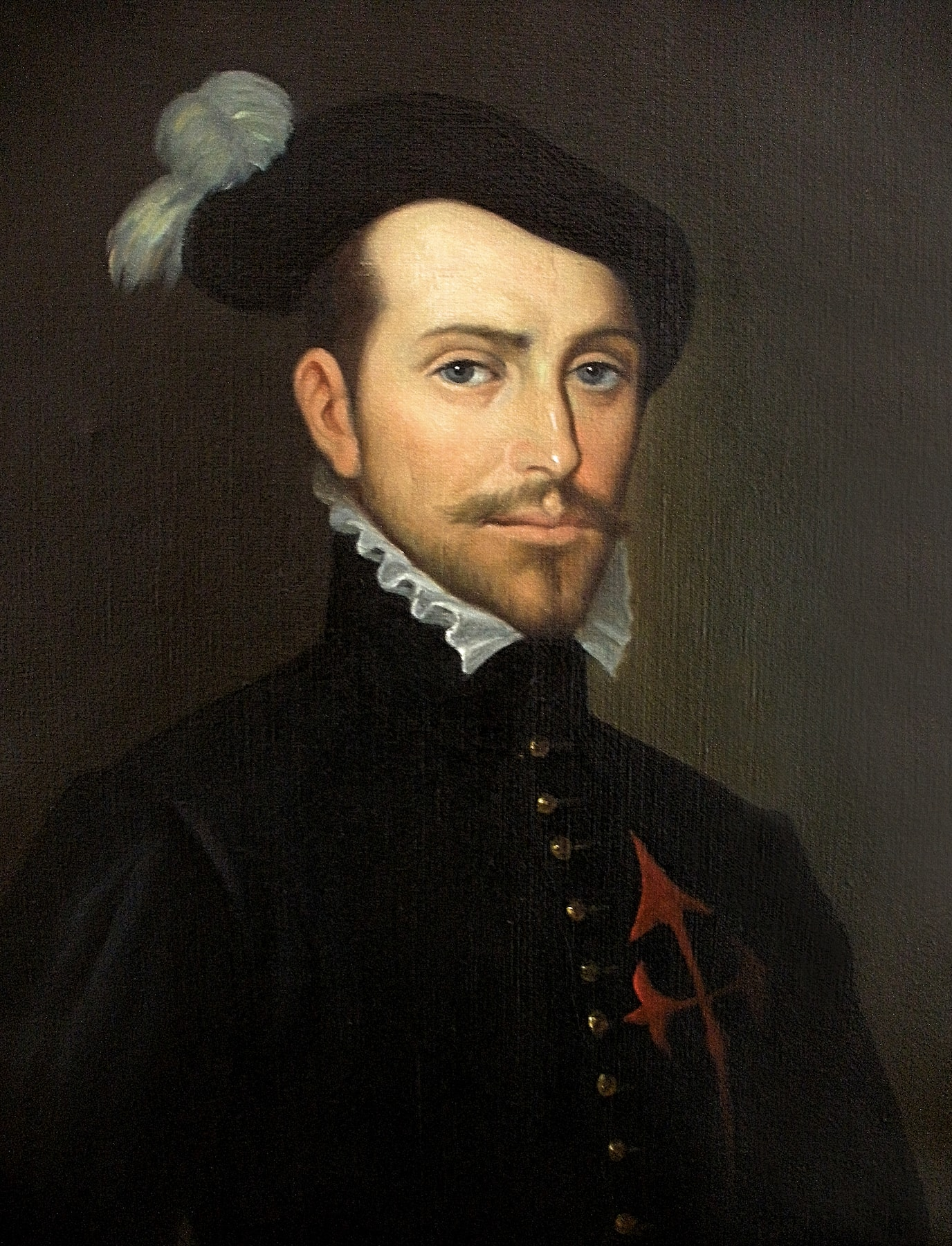
Hernán Cortés

- January 5 – Johann Heß, German theologian (b. 1490)
- January 7 –Albrecht VII, Duke of Mecklenburg (b. 1486)
- January 16 – Johannes Schöner, German astronomer and cartographer (b. 1477)
- January 18 – Pietro Bembo, Italian cardinal and scholar (b. 1470)
- January 19 – Henry Howard, Earl of Surrey, English nobleman, politician and poet, beheaded (b. c.1517)
- January 27 – Anne of Bohemia and Hungary, Queen consort of the Romans, Bohemia and Hungary (b. 1503)
- January 28 – King Henry VIII of England (b. 1491)
- February 25 – Vittoria Colonna, marchioness of Pescara (b. 1490)
- February 28 – Philippa of Guelders, Duchess of Lorraine (b. 1467)
- March 31 – King Francis I of France (b. 1494)
- April 11 – Dorothea of Denmark, Duchess of Prussia, Danish princess (b. 1504)
- May 22 – Daniel, Metropolitan of Moscow (b. c. 1492)
- c. May – Edward Hall, English chronicler and lawyer (b. c.1496)
- June 21 – Sebastiano del Piombo, Italian painter (b. 1485)
- July 20 – Beatus Rhenanus, German humanist and religious reformer (b. 1485)
- August 7 – Saint Cajetan, Italian priest and saint (b. 1480)
- August 17 – Katharina von Zimmern, Swiss sovereign abbess (b. 1478)
- September 10 – Pier Luigi Farnese, Duke of Parma (b. 1503)
- September 17 – Frederick II of Legnica, Duke of Legnica from 1488 (until 1495 and 1505 with his brothers) (b. 1480)
- October 18 – Jacopo Sadoleto, Italian Catholic cardinal (b. 1477)
- December 2 – Hernán Cortés, Spanish conquistador of Mexico (b. 1485)
- December 28 – Konrad Peutinger, German humanist and antiquarian (b. 1465)
- date unknown
  - Jörg Breu the Younger, German painter (b. 1510)
  - Meera (Mirabai), Rajput princess (b. 1498)
  - Photisarath, King of Laos (b. 1501)

1548

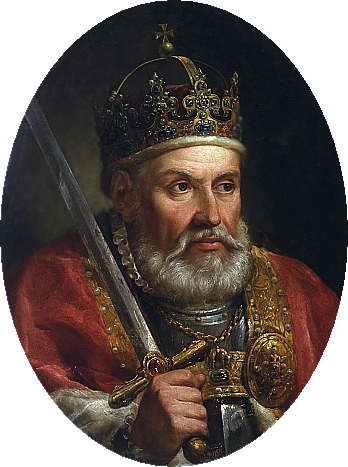
King Sigismund I the Old

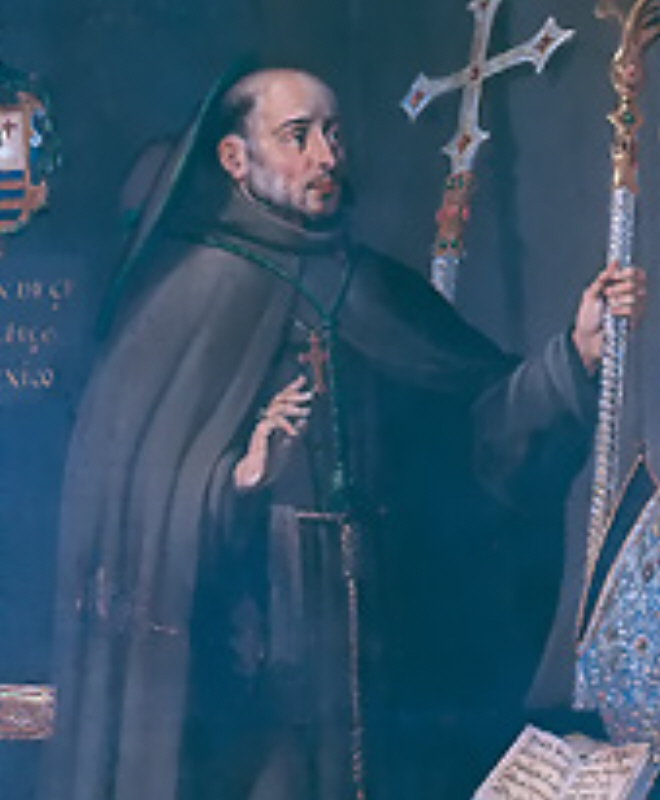
Saint Juan de Zumarraga

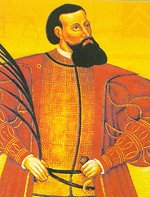
Joao de Castro

- January 9 – Matthäus Zell, German Lutheran pastor (b. 1477)
- January 23 – Bernardo Pisano, Italian composer (b. 1490)
- February 26 – Lorenzino de' Medici, Italian writer and assassin (b. 1514)
- March 23 – Itagaki Nobukata, Japanese retainer
- March 24 – Gissur Einarsson, first Lutheran bishop in Iceland
- April 1 – King Sigismund I the Old of Poland (b. 1467)
- June 3 – Juan de Zumárraga, Spanish Catholic bishop of Mexico (b. 1468)
- June 6 – João de Castro, Portuguese explorer (b. 1500)
- June 14 – Carpentras, French composer (b. c. 1470)
- July 4 – Philip, Duke of Palatinate-Neuburg, German duke (b. 1503)
- July 29 – Gian Gabriele I of Saluzzo, Italian abbot, Marquess of Saluzzo (b. 1501)
- August 2 – Henry II, Duke of Münsterberg-Oels and Count of Glatz (b. 1507)
- September 5 – Catherine Parr, sixth and last Queen of Henry VIII of England (b. c. 1512)
- September 8 – John III of Pernstein, Bohemian land-owner, Governor of Moravia and Count of Kladsko (b. 1487)
- October 27 – Johannes Dantiscus, Polish poet and Bishop of Warmia (b. 1485)
- November 16 – Caspar Creuziger, German humanist (b. 1504)
- December 27 – Francesco Spiera, Italian Protestant jurist (b. 1502)
- date unknown
  - Juan Diego Cuauhtlatoatzin, Mexican Catholic saint (b. 1474)
  - Chief Queen Sri Suriyothai, consort of King Maha Chakkrapat of Ayutthaya (killed in battle)
  - Strongilah, Jewish Ottoman businesswoman.

1549

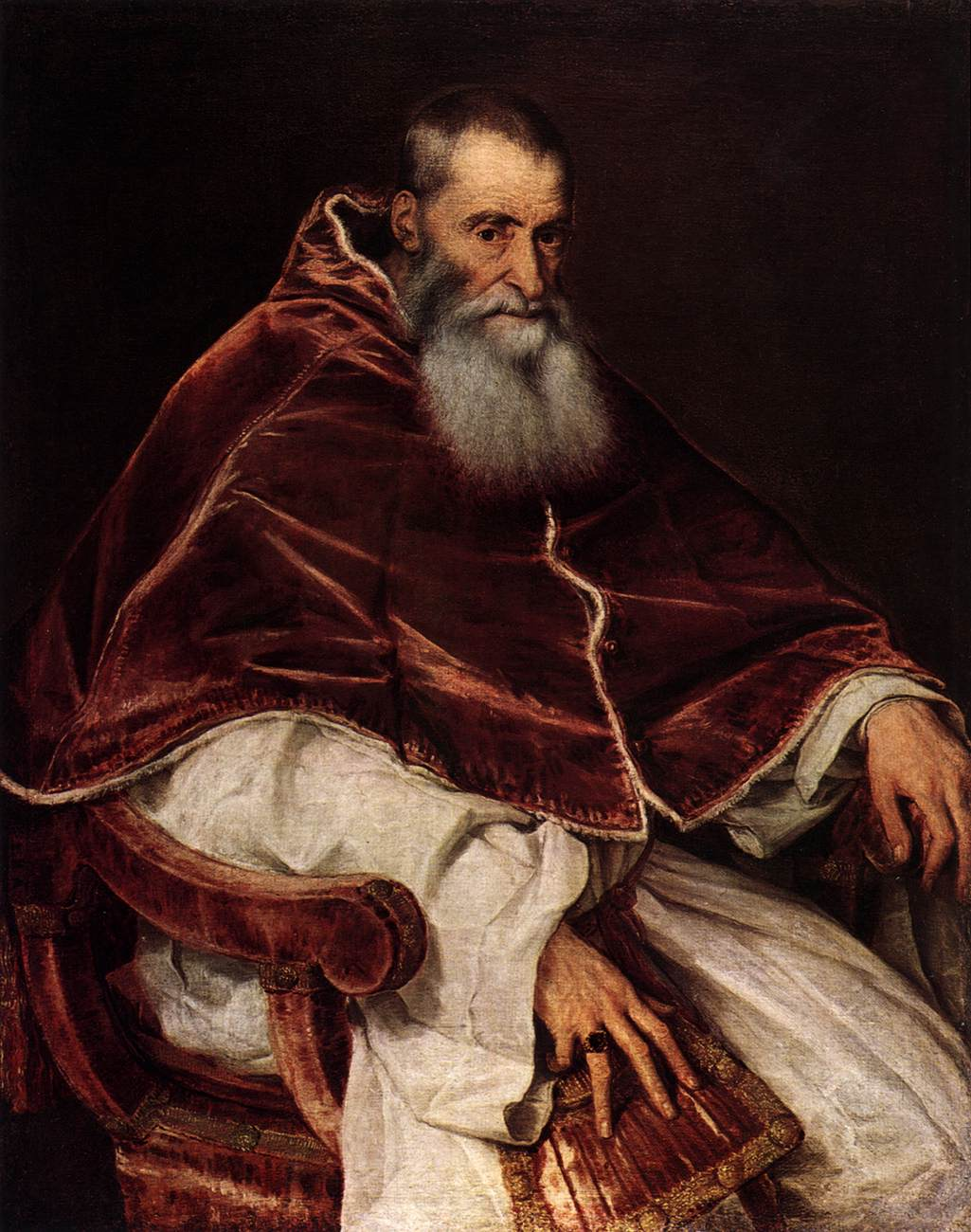
Pope Paul III

- January 28 – Elia Levita, German Yiddish writer (b. 1469)
- February 14 – Il Sodoma, Italian painter (b. 1477)
- March – Mingyi Swe, Burmese viceroy of Toungoo
- March 14 – Lorenzo Cybo, Italian condottiero (b. 1500)
- March 20 – Thomas Seymour, 1st Baron Seymour of Sudeley, English politician and diplomat (b. 1508)
- March 25 – Veit Dietrich, German theologian, writer and reformer (b. 1506)
- April – Andrew Boorde, English traveller (b. 1490)
- April 3 – Matsudaira Hirotada, Japanese daimyo (b. 1526)
- April 15 – Christine of Saxony, German noble (b. 1505)
- April 24 – Ralph Neville, 4th Earl of Westmorland, English earl (b. 1498)
- May 11 – María de Toledo, Vicereine and regent of the Spanish Colony of Santo Domingo (b. 1490)
- June 26 – Luis Cáncer, Spanish Dominican priest, missionary, martyr and servant of God (b. 1500)
- July 19 – Edmund Sheffield, 1st Baron Sheffield, English baron (b. 1521)
- August 11 – Otto I, Duke of Brunswick-Harburg, Prince of Lüneburg and Baron of Harburg (b. 1495)
- September 10 – Anthony Denny, confidant of Henry VIII of England (b. 1501)
- September 21 – Benedetto Accolti the Younger, Italian Catholic cardinal (b. 1497)
- October 27 – Marie d'Albret, Countess of Rethel, French nobility (b. 1491)
- November 10 – Pope Paul III (b. 1468)
- November 26 – Henry Somerset, 2nd Earl of Worcester (b. 1496)
- December 7 – Robert Kett, English rebel (executed)
- December 21 – Marguerite de Navarre, queen of Henry II of Navarre (b. 1492)
- date unknown
  - Daniel Bomberg, Brabantian printer
