= 1544 =

1544 in various calendars
- Gregorian calendar: 1544; MDXLIV
- Ab urbe condita: 2297
- Armenian calendar: 993; ԹՎ ՋՂԳ
- Assyrian calendar: 6294
- Balinese saka calendar: 1465–1466
- Bengali calendar: 950–951
- Berber calendar: 2494
- English Regnal year: 35 Hen. 8 – 36 Hen. 8
- Buddhist calendar: 2088
- Burmese calendar: 906
- Byzantine calendar: 7052–7053
- Chinese calendar: 癸卯年 (Water Rabbit); 4241 or 4034 — to — 甲辰年 (Wood Dragon); 4242 or 4035
- Coptic calendar: 1260–1261
- Discordian calendar: 2710
- Ethiopian calendar: 1536–1537
- Hebrew calendar: 5304–5305
- Hindu calendars
- Vikram Samvat: 1600–1601
- Shaka Samvat: 1465–1466
- Kali Yuga: 4644–4645
- Holocene calendar: 11544
- Igbo calendar: 544–545
- Iranian calendar: 922–923
- Islamic calendar: 950–951
- Japanese calendar: Tenbun 13 (天文１３年)
- Javanese calendar: 1462–1463
- Julian calendar: 1544; MDXLIV
- Korean calendar: 3877
- Minguo calendar: 368 before ROC 民前368年
- Nanakshahi calendar: 76
- Thai solar calendar: 2086–2087
- Tibetan calendar: ཆུ་མོ་ཡོས་ལོ་ (female Water-Hare); 1670 or 1289 or 517 — to — ཤིང་ཕོ་འབྲུག་ལོ་ (male Wood-Dragon); 1671 or 1290 or 518

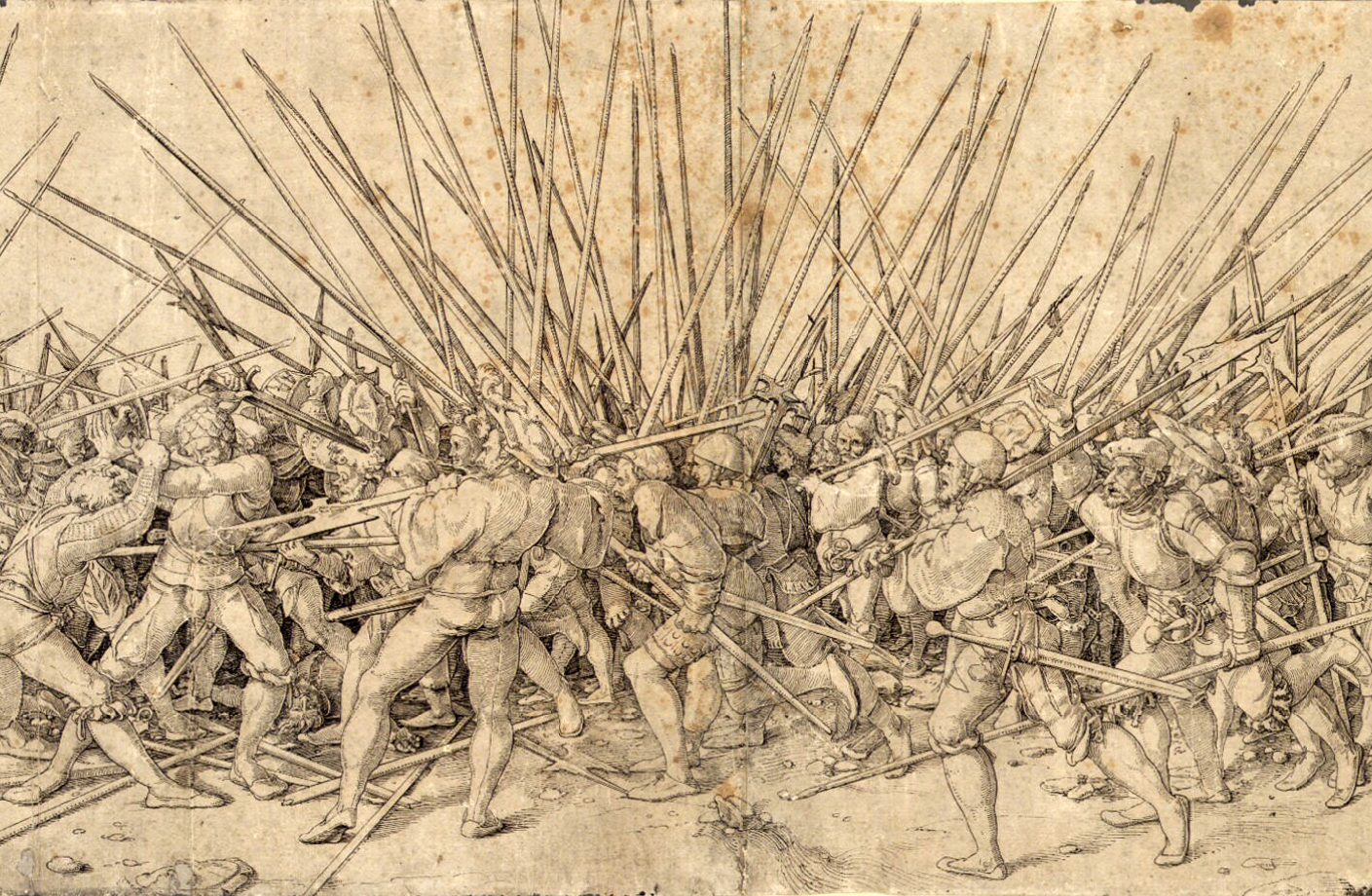
April 11: The Battle of Ceresole is fought in Italy

1544 (MDXLIV) was a leap year starting on Tuesday of the Julian calendar, the 1544th year of the Common Era (CE) and Anno Domini (AD) designations, the 544th year of the 2nd millennium, the 44th year of the 16th century, and the 5th year of the 1540s decade. As of the start of 1544, the Gregorian calendar was 10 days ahead of the Julian calendar, which was the dominant calendar of the time.

== Events ==
=== January–March ===
- January 4 – In India, Maldeo Rathore, King of Marwar (now part of the state of Rajasthan) is tricked by counterintelligence spread by Mughal Emperor and Afghan Shah Sher Shah Suri into departing from Jodhpur. The Battle of Sammel begins shortly afterward and is won by the Afghan and Mughal armies.
- January 13 – At Västerås, the estates of Sweden swear loyalty to King Gustav Vasa and to his heirs, ending the traditional electoral monarchy in Sweden. Gustav subsequently signs an alliance with the Kingdom of France.
- January 24 – During a solar eclipse visible over the Netherlands, Dutch mathematician and designer Gemma Frisius makes the first recorded use of a camera obscura and uses it to observe the event without directly looking at the Sun. Frisius writes about the event the next year and illustrates it in his book De Radio Astronomica et Geometrica (Regarding rays of light in astronomy and geometry).
- February 20 – The Fourth Diet of Speyer is convened.
- March 7 – Five Roman Catholic priests— John Larke, John Ireland, the vicar of Eltham and Robert Singleton are executed at Tyburn, outside of London, in England after being convicted of participating in the Prebendaries' Plot to remove Thomas Cranmer, the Protestant Archbishop of Canterbury.
- March 16 –
  - The Battle of Glasgow is fought for control of Scotland between Matthew Stewart, 4th Earl of Lennox and the troops of the Regent, James Hamilton, 2nd Earl of Arran
  - Friedrich II becomes the new Elector Palatine of Germany's Rhineland within the Holy Roman Empire upon the death of his brother Ludwig V at Heidelberg.
- March 29 – Royal assent is given by King Henry VIII to laws passed by the English Parliament, including the Third Succession Act, the amended Treason Act and the King's Style Act.

=== April–June ===
- April 11 – Battle of Ceresole: French forces under the Comte d'Enghien defeat forces of the Holy Roman Empire, under the Marques Del Vasto, near Turin.
- April 21 – The Italian town of Agropoli, frequently targeted by pirates from North Africa, is sacked by Ottoman raiders and 100 people are taken prisoner.
- May 3 – Edward Seymour, Earl of Hertford, with an English army, captures Leith and Edinburgh from the Kingdom of Scotland.
- May 7 – Edward Seymour, Lord Hertford, carries out the burning of Edinburgh, capital of the Kingdom of Scotland, by the English Navy, then proceeds to destroy neighboring areas.
- May 17 – At Lima, Blasco Núñez Vela takes office as the first Spanish Governor of the Viceroyalty of Peru, which encompasses most of what are now the nations of Peru, Ecuador, Bolivia, Paraguay and Uruguay, as well as the western part of Brazil.
- May 23 –
  - The Treaty of Speyer is signed between the Holy Roman Empire and the Kingdom of Denmark (which includes Norway). Charles V, Holy Roman Emperor agrees to recognize Christian III as the ruler of Denmark and Norway, and abandons further attempts to restore King Christian II to the throne. In return, Denmark and Norway agree to support the Habsburg monarchy in the Empire.
  - The allied French and Ottoman navies depart from the French port of Marseille and travel to Constantinople, the Ottoman capital. The French fleet is commanded by Antoine Escalin des Aimars, known as Captain Polin, French ambassador to the Ottomans, while the Turks are led by Hayreddin Barbarossa.
- May 25 – On orders of King Henry VIII, the English Navy, commanded by Thomas Howard, 3rd Duke of Norfolk, begins crossing the English Channel to invade from the west with 19,000 troops, while Charles V, Holy Roman Emperor, commences an invasion of France from the east.
- June 4 – A combined force of troops from the Holy Roman Empire and from Spain, both commanded by Emperor Charles V, defeat the French in the Battle of Serravalle after three days of fighting.
- June 8 – The Duke of Norfolk crosses the English Channel after having landed troops in Normandy.
- June 24 – The plundering of the Italian island of Ischia, part of the Kingdom of Naples is carried out by the Ottoman Empire Navy, commanded by Hayreddin Barbarossa, who captures 4,000 of the residents and then sells them as slaves in Algeria.

=== July–September ===
- July 10– Troops of the Holy Roman Empire begin the six-week siege of Saint-Dizier in eastern France.
- July 15 – Battle of the Shirts: The Clan Fraser of Lovat and Macdonalds of Clan Ranald fight over a disputed chiefship in Scotland; reportedly, five Frasers and eight or ten Macdonalds survive.
- July 19– Italian War of 1542–46: King Henry VIII of England begins the siege of the city of Boulogne in northern France and continues for almost two months before the city surrenders.
- July 20 – Albert, Duke of Prussia signs a deed granting land for creation of the University of Königsberg.
- August 17 –
  - The University of Königsberg is inaugurated in Prussia.
  - In France, Saint-Dizier surrenders to the Holy Roman Empire after a siege of more than a month.
- September 14 – The siege of Boulogne ends as the city surrenders to King Henry VIII.
- September 18
  - Peace of Crépy: Peace is declared between Charles V, Holy Roman Emperor, and Francis I of France. The war between France and England continues.
  - The expedition of Juan Bautista Pastene makes landfall in San Pedro Bay, southern Chile, claiming the territory for Spain.
- September 22 – Captain Juan Bautista Pastene leads the first European expedition to the estuary of Valdivia, Chile and Corral Bay.

=== October–December ===
- October 9 – Second Siege of Boulogne: French forces under the Dauphin assault Boulogne, but are ultimately unsuccessful.
- November 24 – Rüstem Opuković Pasha, son-in-law of the Sultan Suleiman the Magnificent, is appointed as the new Grand Vizier of the Ottoman Empire, replacing Hadım Suleiman Pasha.
- December 9 – Crown Prince Yi Ho becomes the new King of Korea upon the death of his father, King Joseon. Yi Ho reigns for eight months before being poisoned by his own mother, and is posthumously named as King Injong of Joseon.

=== Date unknown ===
- Mongols, led by Anda, burn the suburbs of Beijing in China.
- After being asked by Cosimo I de' Medici, Grand Duke of Tuscany, botanist Luca Ghini comes to the University of Pisa as the chair of botany, where he had the year prior established the Orto botanico di Pisa.
- Rats make their first appearance in South America, arriving in Peru with the species black rat.
- Portuguese explorers encounter the island of Taiwan, and call it Ilha Formosa ("Beautiful Island").
- The earliest mention of the tomato in European literature appeared in Pietro Andrea Mattioli's herbal.

== Births ==
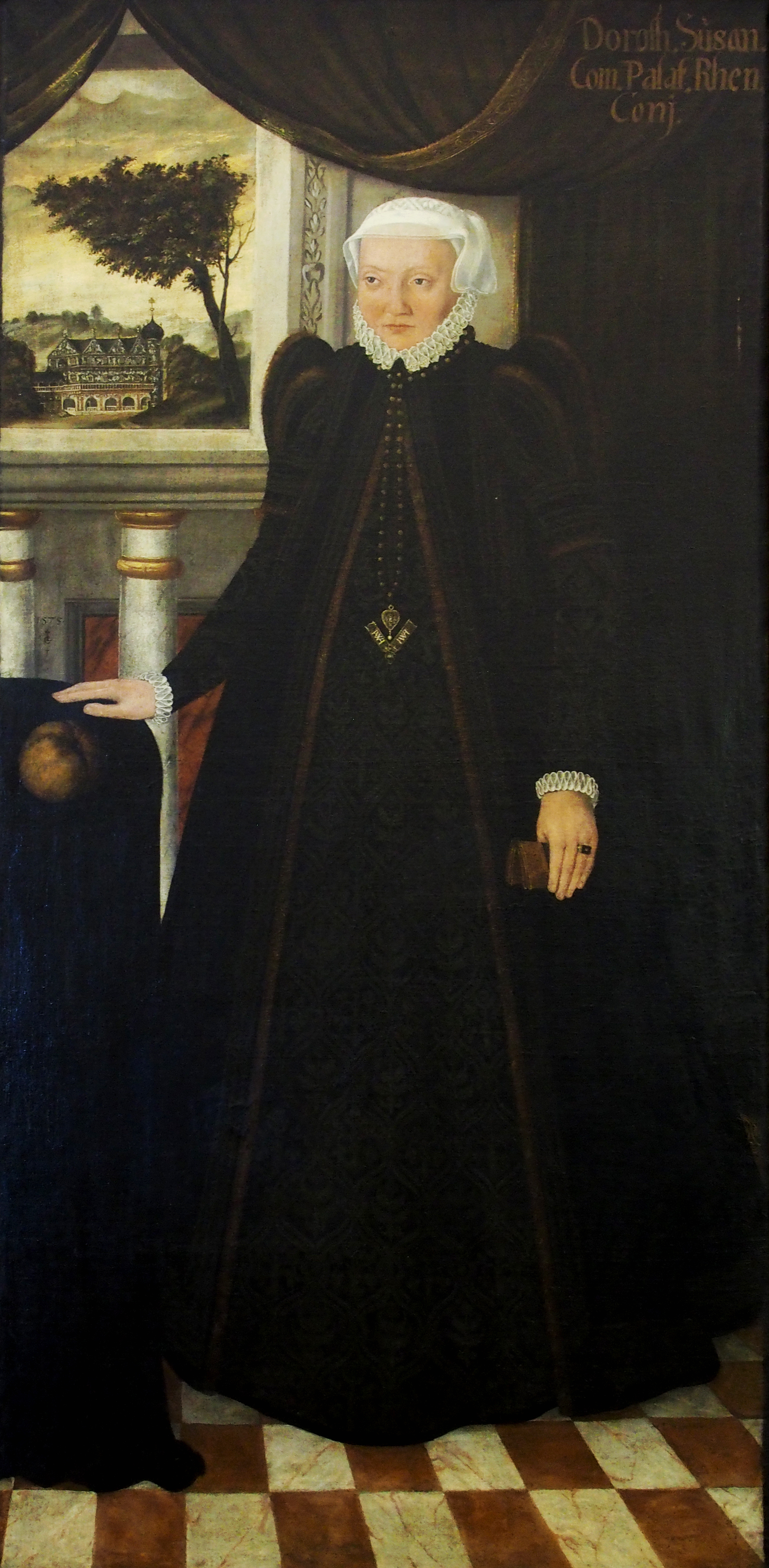
Dorothea Susanne of Simmern

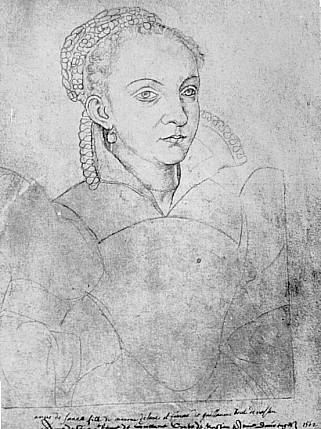
Anna of Saxony

- January 19 – King Francis II of France (d. 1560)
- January 24 – Gillis van Coninxloo, Flemish painter (d. 1607)
- February 3 – César de Bus, French Catholic priest (d. 1607)
- March 11 – Torquato Tasso, Italian poet (d. 1595)
- April – Thomas Fleming, English judge (d. 1613)
- April 20 – Renata of Lorraine, duchess consort of Bavaria (d. 1602)
- May 24 – William Gilbert, English scientist and astronomer (d. 1603)
- July 14 – Henry Compton, 1st Baron Compton, English politician (d. 1589)
- August 9 – Bogislaw XIII, Duke of Pomerania (d. 1606)
- September 1 – John Gordon, Scottish bishop (d. 1619)
- September 28 or September 29 – Giovanni de' Medici, Italian Catholic cardinal (d. 1562)
- November 1 – Hasan Kafi Pruščak, Bosnian scholar and judge (d. 1615)
- November 15 – Dorothea Susanne of Simmern, Duchess of Saxe-Weimar (d. 1592)
- December 23 – Anna of Saxony, only child and heiress of Maurice, Elector of Saxony (d. 1577)
- date unknown
  - Richard Bancroft, Archbishop of Canterbury (d. 1610)
  - Thomas Hobson, English carrier and origin of the phrase Hobson's choice (d. 1631)
  - Maddalena Casulana, Italian composer, lutenist and singer (d. 1590)
- probable
  - George Whetstone, English writer (d. 1587)

== Deaths ==
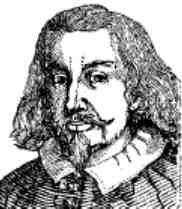
Johannes Magnus

- March 16 – Louis V, Elector Palatine (1508–1544) (b. 1478)
- March 22 – Johannes Magnus, last Catholic Archbishop of Sweden (b. 1488)
- April 30 – Thomas Audley, Lord Chancellor of England (b. 1488)
- June 14 – Antoine, Duke of Lorraine (b. 1489)
- July 15 – René of Châlon, Prince of the House of Orange (b. 1519)
- June 23 – Eleonore of Fürstenberg, wife of Philip IV, Count of Hanau-Lichtenberg (b. 1523)
- August 19 – Hans Buser, Swiss noble (b. 1513)
- September 12 – Clément Marot, French poet (b. 1496)
- September 25 – Valerius Cordus, German physician and scientist (b. 1515)
- October 10 – Charles Blount, 5th Baron Mountjoy, English courtier and patron of learning (b. 1516)
- October 12 – Antonio Pucci, Italian Catholic cardinal (b. 1485)
- November 13 – Ursula van Beckum, Dutch Anapabtist (b. 1520)
- November 15 – Lucy Brocadelli, Dominican tertiary and stigmatic (b. 1476)
- November 29 – Jungjong of Joseon (b. 1488)
- December 9 – Teofilo Folengo, Italian poet (b. 1491)
- date unknown
  - Ulick na gCeann Burke, 1st Earl of Clanricarde
  - Chen Chun, Chinese painter (b. 1483)
  - Margaret Roper, English writer (b. 1505)
  - Nilakantha Somayaji, Indian mathematician and astronomer (b. 1444)
  - Manco Inca Yupanqui, Inca ruler (b. 1516)
  - Bonaventure des Périers, French author (b. 1500)
