= Larke =

Surname list

Larke is a surname. Notable people with the name include:

- Alex Larke (born 1979), British singer
- Glenda Larke, Australian writer
- Joan Larke (c.1490–1532), English mistress
- John Larke (c.1500–1544), English priest
- John Short Larke (1840–1910), Canadian trade commissioner
- Thomas Larke, English priest

== See also ==
- Larke, Pennsylvania
- Lark (name)
