= Lark (name) =

Lark is a surname and a given name which may refer to:

== Surname ==
- Frank Lark (died 1946), New Zealand politician
- Hoyt W. Lark (1893–1971), a mayor of Cranston, Rhode Island, United States
- Jim Lark, professor of systems engineering and applied mathematics and United States Libertarian Party National Chairman from 2000 to 2002
- K. Gordon Lark (1930–2020), American biologist
- Maria Lark (born 1997), Russian-American actress
- Michael Lark, American comics artist
- Sarah Lark (born 1983), Welsh singer and actress
- Sylvia Lark (1947–1990) Seneca painter and printmaker
- Tobi Lark (born 1941), American-born Canadian soul and gospel singer

== Given name ==
- Lark Pien (born c. 1972), American cartoonist
- Lark Voorhies (born 1974), American actress

== See also ==
- Larke
