= Barbara Ann Fenton-Fung =

American politician

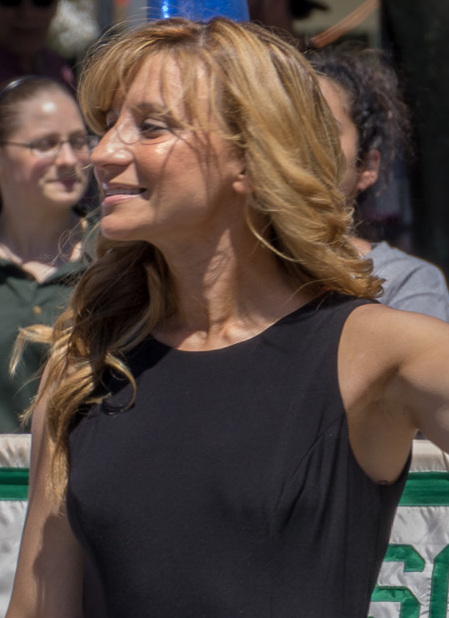
- Fenton-Fung in 2016

Member of the Rhode Island House of Representatives from the 15th district
- In office January 5, 2021 – January 7, 2025
- Preceded by: Nicholas Mattiello
- Succeeded by: Christopher Paplauskas

Personal details
- Born: Barbara Ann Fenton; December 10, 1980 (age 45) Newport, Rhode Island, U.S.
- Party: Republican
- Spouse: Allan Fung (m. 2016)
- Education: Northeastern University (BS, MS); Arkansas State University (MS)

Barbara Ann Fenton-Fung (born December 10, 1980) is an American politician who served as a member of the Rhode Island House of Representatives for the 15th district. Elected in November 2020, she assumed office on January 5, 2021.

== Early life and education ==
Fenton-Fung was born in Newport, Rhode Island, and was raised in Middletown. She graduated from Middletown High School in 1998 and Northeastern University, where she was valedictorian of the Bouvé College of Health Sciences. She later earned a Master of Science in physical therapy from Northeastern University. Fenton-Fung has also earned a master's degree in digital media management from Arkansas State University and obtained a certificate in emergency management from Auburn University.

== Career ==
After earning her master's degree in physical therapy, Fenton-Fung joined Rhode Island Hospital. She later became involved in Republican Party politics and was president of the Rhode Island Young Republicans.

In the 2020 elections, Fenton-Fung ran for the District 15 seat in the Rhode Island House of Representatives against Nicholas Mattiello, the speaker of the state house. She defeated Mattiello by 18 points in the general election, and became the first Rhode Islander to defeat a sitting Speaker in 114 years. She is also the first woman to ever represent the district.

In the 2022 election, Fenton-Fung was challenged in the Republican primary. She was victorious over Suzanne Downing, winning over 92% of the vote. Fenton-Fung was unopposed in the general election.

In January 2024, Fenton-Fung ran in the Cranston mayoral race with intention to primary Republican incumbent Kenneth Hopkins. Hopkins ultimately won the nomination.

== Personal life ==
Fenton-Fung met then-Cranston mayor Allan Fung at the 2012 Republican National Convention. They married at St. Mary's Church in Newport, Rhode Island, in 2016.
