= Michael Napolitano =

American politician

Mayor of Cranston, Rhode Island
- In office January 2007 – January 2009
- Preceded by: Steve Laffey
- Succeeded by: Allan Fung

Personal details
- Born: Cranston, Rhode Island, U.S.
- Party: Democratic
- Spouse: Anne Ruggieri
- Profession: Lawyer

Michael Napolitano is an American politician who served as mayor of the city of Cranston, Rhode Island from 2007 to 2009. He defeated Councilman Allan Fung by 79 votes. He is a former Municipal Court Judge of the city, as well as a former instructor at Providence College. He oversaw his own law offices for 25 years before becoming Mayor.

He graduated from Providence College with a degree in political science and received a Juris Doctor from Suffolk University. He is the last Democratic mayor of Cranston to date.

== See also ==
- List of mayors of Cranston, Rhode Island
