= Robert Singleton (priest) =

English martyr (died 1544)

Robert Singleton (died 1544), also known as John, was an English Roman Catholic priest, executed on a treason charge. He is considered a Catholic martyr by Antonio Possevino, in his Apparatus Sacer.

== Life ==
He belonged to a Lancashire family and was educated at the University of Oxford, but does not appear to have graduated. He became a priest, and for some utterances which were accounted treasonable was brought before a court of bishops in 1543. He was executed at Tyburn on 7 March 1544, along with Germain Gardiner and John Larke.

== Works ==
He is said to have written:

- Treatise of the Seven Churches
- Of the Holy Ghost
- Comment on Certain Prophecies
- Theory of the Earth, dedicated to Henry VII. Thomas Tanner calls this Of the Seven Ages of the World.

None seem to have been printed.
