= List of mayors of Cranston, Rhode Island =

The following is a list of mayors of the city of Cranston, Rhode Island, United States.

- Edward M. Sullivan, c.1911
- John Wesley Horton, c.1913-1920
- Arthur A. Rhodes, c.1923, 1927
- Frank C. Speck, 1925–1926
- Frederick A. Jones, c.1931
- Ernest L. Sprague, c.1939
- Hoyt W. Lark, 1945–1953
- George R. Beane, c.1953-1954
- John Turnbull, c.1955
- Earl A. Colvin, c.1959
- Francis R. Dailey, c.1961
- James Di Prete Jr., c.1965-1967
- James L. Taft Jr., c.1971–1979
- Edward D. DiPrete, 1978-1985
- Michael Traficante, c.1985-1999
- John O'Leary, c.1999-2002
- Steve Laffey, 2003–2007
- Michael Napolitano, 2007–2009
- Allan Fung, 2009–2021
- Kenneth Hopkins, 2021–present

== See also ==
- Cranston history
