= Thomas Wolsey =

English statesman and cardinal (1473–1530)

His Eminence Thomas Wolsey
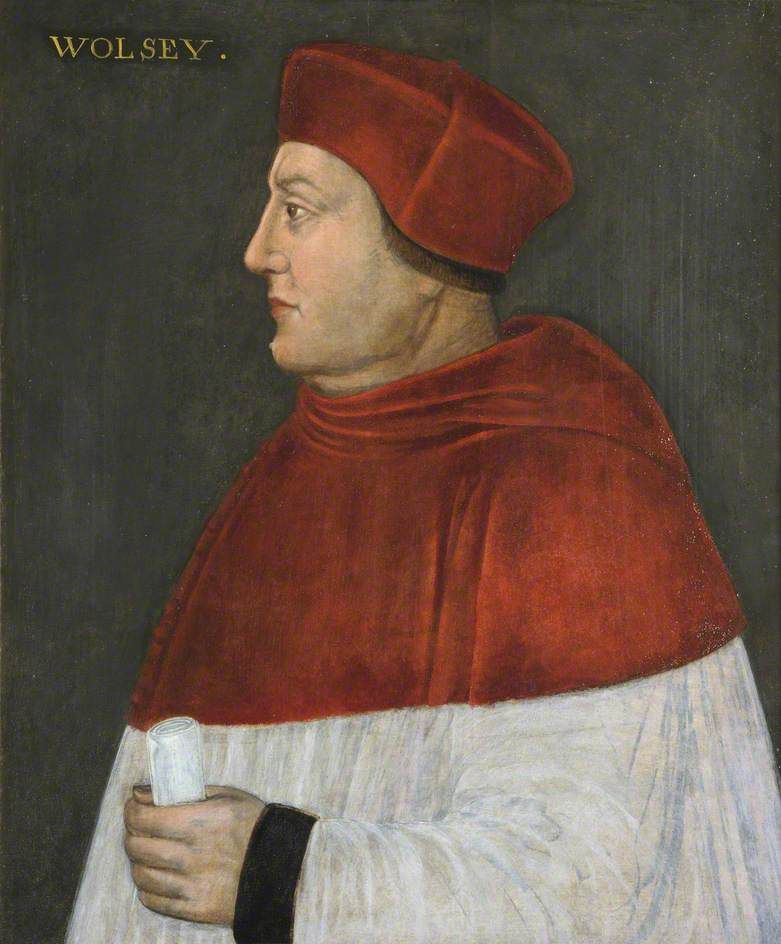
- Portrait at Trinity College, Cambridge, c. 1585–1596

Lord High Chancellor of England
- In office 24 December 1515 – 26 October 1529
- Monarch: Henry VIII
- Preceded by: William Warham
- Succeeded by: Thomas More
- Cardinal, Archbishop of York and; Primate of England
- Church: Roman Catholic
- Appointed: 15 September 1514
- Term ended: 29 November 1530
- Predecessor: Christopher Bainbridge
- Successor: Edward Lee
- Other post: Cardinal-Priest of S. Cecilia (1515–1530)
- Previous posts: Bishop of Lincoln (1514); Administrator of Bath and Wells (1518–1523); Administrator of Durham (1523–1530); Administrator of Winchester (1529–1530)

Orders
- Ordination: 10 March 1498 by Augustine Church, Titular Bishop of Lydda
- Consecration: 26 March 1514 by William Warham
- Created cardinal: 10 September 1515 by Leo X

Personal details
- Born: c. March 1473 Ipswich, Suffolk, England
- Died: 29 November 1530 (aged 57) Leicester, Leicestershire, England
- Buried: Leicester Abbey
- Parents: Robert Wolsey (father); Joan Daundy (mother)
- Children: Thomas Wynter; Dorothy
- Education: Magdalen College, Oxford
- Signature: Thomas Wolsey's signature

- Coat of arms: Thomas Wolsey's coat of arms

Thomas Wolsey (Note: Sometimes spelled Woolsey, Wulcy, or other variations.) (/ˈwʊlzi/ WUUL-zee; c. March 1473 – 29 November 1530) was an English statesman and Catholic cardinal. When Henry VIII became King of England in 1509, Wolsey became the king's almoner. Wolsey's affairs prospered and by 1514 he had become the controlling figure in virtually all matters of state. He also held important ecclesiastical appointments. These included the Archbishop of York—the second most important role in the English church—and that of papal legate. His appointment as a cardinal by Pope Leo X in 1515 gave him precedence over all other English clergy.

The highest political position Wolsey attained was Lord Chancellor, the king's chief adviser (formally, as his successor and disciple Thomas Cromwell was not). In that position, he enjoyed great freedom and was often depicted as the alter rex ("other king"). After failing to negotiate an annulment of Henry's marriage to Catherine of Aragon, Wolsey fell out of favour and was stripped of his government titles. He retreated to York to fulfil his ecclesiastical duties as archbishop, a position he nominally held but had neglected during his years in government. He was recalled to London to answer to charges of treason—charges Henry commonly used against ministers who fell out of his favour—but died from natural causes on the way.

== Early life ==
Thomas Wolsey was born in about 1473, the son of Robert Wolsey of Ipswich and his wife, Joan Daundy. Widespread traditions identify his father as a butcher; his modest origin became a topic of criticism later, when he amassed wealth and power that critics thought more befitting a member of the high nobility. In reality his father owned several businesses and his mother was related to the influential Wingfield and Daundy families. Wolsey attended Ipswich School and Magdalen College School before studying theology at Magdalen College, Oxford. His education and career were assisted by his uncle, Edmund Daundy.

On 10 March 1498, he was ordained as a priest in Marlborough, Wiltshire, and remained in Oxford, first as the Master of Magdalen College School, and soon the dean of divinity. From 1500 to 1509, Wolsey held a living as rector of St Mary's Church, Limington, in Somerset. He served as Dean of Hereford Cathedral in 1512.

In 1502, he became a chaplain to Henry Deane, archbishop of Canterbury, who died the following year. He was then taken into the household of Sir Richard Nanfan, who made Wolsey executor of his estate. After Nanfan's death in 1507, Wolsey entered the service of King Henry VII.

Wolsey benefited from Henry VII's policy of curbing the nobility and favouring those from more humble backgrounds. Henry VII appointed Wolsey royal chaplain. In this position Wolsey served as secretary to Richard Foxe, who recognised Wolsey's ability, dedication, industry and willingness to take on tedious tasks. Wolsey's remarkable rise to power from humble origins attests to his intelligence, administrative ability, industriousness, ambition, and rapport with the king. In April 1508, Wolsey was sent to Scotland to discuss with King James IV rumours of the renewal of the Auld Alliance.

Wolsey's rise coincided with the accession in April 1509 of Henry VIII, whose character, policies and attitude to diplomacy differed significantly from his father's. In 1509 Henry appointed Wolsey to the post of almoner, a position that gave him a seat on the Privy Council and an opportunity to attain greater prominence and establish personal rapport with the king. A factor in Wolsey's rise was the young Henry VIII's relative lack of interest in the details of government during his early years.

== Political career ==
=== Rise to prominence ===
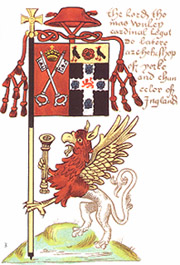
Heraldic banner of Wolsey as Archbishop of York, showing the arms of the See of York impaling his personal arms, with a cardinal's hat above. The griffin supporter holds the Lord Chancellor's mace.

The primary counsellors Henry VIII inherited from his father were Richard Foxe (c. 1448 – 1528, Bishop of Winchester 1501–1528) and William Warham (c. 1450 – 1532, Archbishop of Canterbury 1503–1532). They were cautious and conservative, advising the king to act as a careful administrator like his father. Henry soon appointed to his Privy Council men more sympathetic to his own views and inclinations. Until 1511, Wolsey was adamantly antiwar, but when the king expressed his enthusiasm for an invasion of France, Wolsey adapted his views to the king's and gave persuasive speeches to the Privy Council in favour of war. Warham and Foxe, who did not share the king's enthusiasm for the French war, fell from power (1515/1516), and Wolsey took over as the king's most trusted advisor and administrator. When Warham resigned as Lord Chancellor in 1515, probably under pressure from Wolsey, Henry appointed Wolsey in his place.

Wolsey made careful moves to destroy or neutralise other courtiers' influence. He helped cause the fall of Edward Stafford, 3rd Duke of Buckingham, in 1521, and in 1527 he prosecuted, unsuccessfully, Henry's close friend William Compton and Henry's ex-mistress Anne Stafford, Countess of Huntingdon, for adultery. In the case of Charles Brandon, 1st Duke of Suffolk, Wolsey adopted a different strategy, attempting to win Suffolk's favour by his actions after the duke secretly married Henry's sister Mary Tudor, Dowager Queen of France, much to the king's displeasure. Wolsey advised the king not to execute the newlyweds but to embrace them; Brandon was already friends with Wolsey as well as a kinsman. However the bride, both as sister to Henry and as Dowager Queen of France, had high royal status that could have threatened Wolsey had she so chosen.

Wolsey's rise to a position of great secular power paralleled his increasing status in the church. He became a canon of Windsor in 1511. In 1514 he was made Bishop of Lincoln and then Archbishop of York in the same year. Pope Leo X made him a cardinal in 1515, with the titular church of St Cecilia in Trastevere. In 1518 he was appointed as abbot of St. Albans and bishop of Bath. Following the success of the English campaign in France and the peace negotiations that followed, Wolsey's ecclesiastical career advanced further: in 1523 he became Bishop of Durham, a post with wide political powers, and thus became known as Prince-Bishop of Durham. In 1529 he moved on from the bishop position in Durham to become the Bishop of Winchester. With his roles in the church came great wealth and estates, and with the accumulation of his different roles in the church he made upwards of £35,000 a year.

== Foreign policy ==
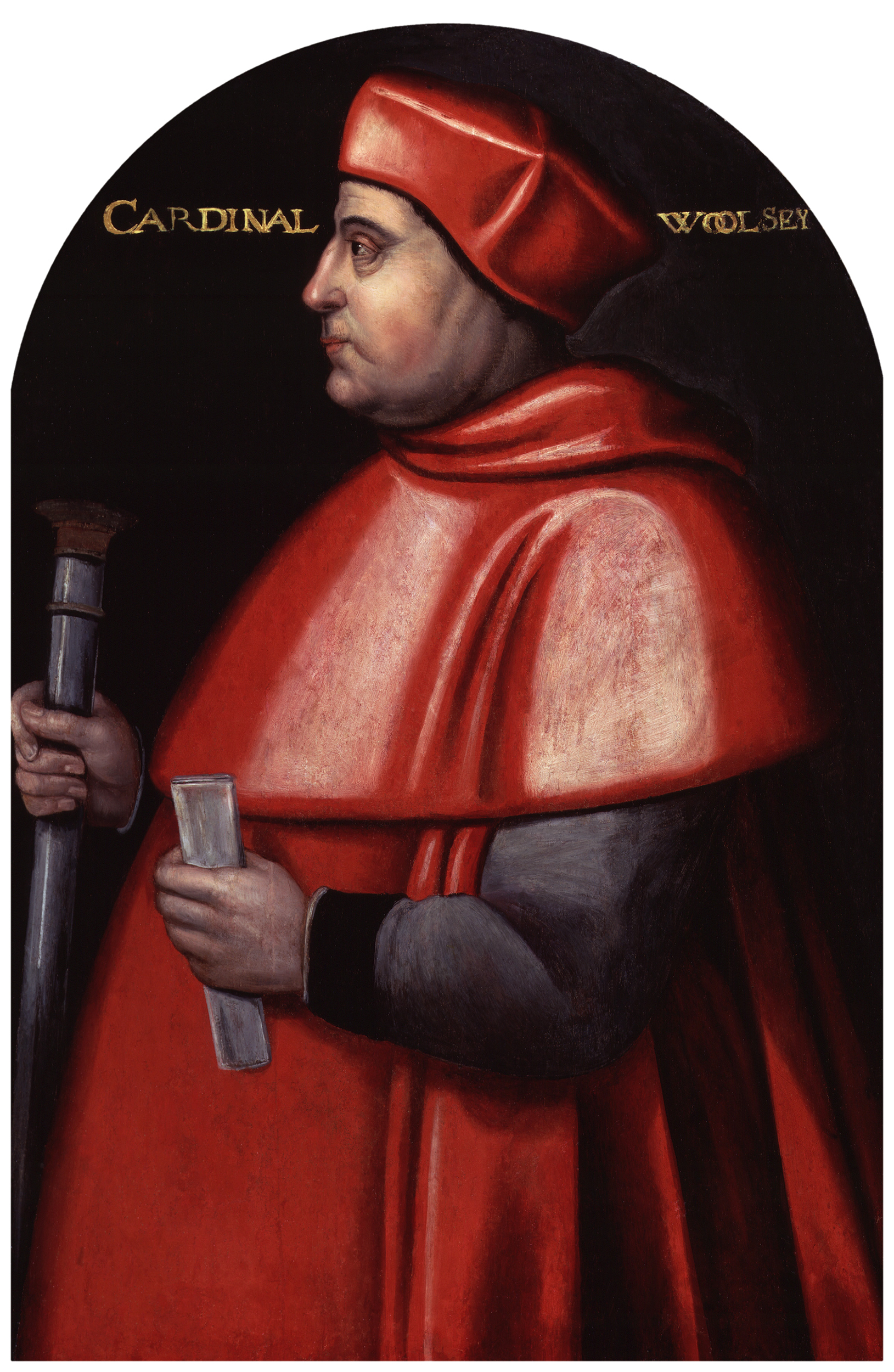
Thomas Wolsey by an unknown artist c. 1520 held in the National Portrait Gallery, London

=== War with France ===
The Anglo-French War (1512–14) gave Wolsey a significant opportunity to demonstrate his talents in foreign policy. A convenient justification for going to war came in 1511 in the form of a plea for help from Pope Julius II, who was beginning to feel threatened by France. England formed an alliance with Julius, King Ferdinand II of Aragon, and Maximilian I, Holy Roman Emperor, against King Louis XII of France.

The first English campaign against France proved unsuccessful, partly due to the unreliability of the alliance with Ferdinand. Henry learned from the mistakes of the campaign and in 1513, still with papal support, launched a joint attack on France with Maximilian, successfully capturing two French cities and causing the French to retreat. Wolsey's ability to keep a large number of troops supplied and equipped for the duration of the war proved a major factor in the English success. He also had a key role in negotiating the Anglo-French treaty of 7 August 1514, which secured a temporary peace between the two nations. Under this treaty, Louis XII would marry Henry's young sister, Mary. In addition England was able to keep the captured city of Tournai and secure an increase in the annual pension France paid.

Meanwhile, a turnover of rulers in Europe threatened to diminish England's influence. With Henry's sister, Mary, married to Louis XII on 9 October 1514, an alliance was formed, but Louis was not in good health. Less than three months later, he died and was succeeded by the young and ambitious Francis I.

Queen Mary had allegedly secured a promise from Henry that if Louis died, she could marry whomever she pleased. Following Louis's death, she secretly married Suffolk, with Francis I's assistance, which prevented another marriage alliance. As Mary was the only princess Henry could use to secure marriage alliances, this was a bitter blow. Wolsey then proposed an alliance with Spain and the Holy Roman Empire against France.

=== Papal legate ===
The death of Ferdinand II of Aragon, Henry VIII's father-in-law and England's closest ally, in 1516 was a further blow. Ferdinand was succeeded by Charles V, who immediately proposed peace with France. After Maximilian I's death in 1519, Charles was elected in his stead; thus Charles ruled a substantial portion of Europe and English influence became limited on the continent.

But Wolsey managed to assert English influence by other means. In 1517, Pope Leo X sought peace in Europe to form a crusade against the Ottoman Empire. In 1518 Wolsey was made Papal Legate in England, enabling him to realise Leo's desire for peace by organising the Treaty of London. The treaty showed Wolsey as the arbiter of Europe, organising a massive peace summit involving 20 nations. This put England at the forefront of European diplomacy and drew her out of isolation, making her a desirable ally. This is well illustrated by the Anglo-French treaty signed two days afterwards. It was partly this peace treaty that caused conflict between France and Spain. In 1519, when Charles V ascended to the throne of the Holy Roman Emperor, King Francis I of France was infuriated. He had invested enormous sums in bribing the electorate to elect him emperor, and thus used the Treaty of London as a justification for the Habsburg-Valois conflict. Wolsey appeared to act as mediator between the two powers, both of which were vying for England's support.

=== Field of the Cloth of Gold ===
Another of Wolsey's diplomatic triumphs was the Field of the Cloth of Gold in 1520. Wolsey organised much of this grandiose meeting between Francis I and Henry VIII, accompanied by 5,000 followers and involving court activities more than military discussion. Though it seemed to open the door to peaceful negotiations with France if the king wished, it was also a chance for a lavish display of English wealth and power before the rest of Europe, through flamboyant celebrations and events such as jousting, with the two kings competing, though not against each other. With France and Spain vying for England's allegiance, Wolsey could choose the ally that better suited his policies. Wolsey chose Charles mainly because England's economy would suffer from the loss of the lucrative cloth trade industry between England and the Netherlands had France been chosen instead.

Under Wolsey's guidance, Europe's chief nations sought to outlaw war among Christian nations. Garrett Mattingly, who has studied the causes of wars in that era, found that treaties of non-aggression such as this one could never be stronger than their sponsors' armies. When those forces were about equal, the treaties typically widened the conflict. That is, diplomacy could sometimes postpone war, but could not prevent wars based on irreconcilable interests and ambitions. What was lacking, Mattingly concludes, was a neutral power whose judgements were generally accepted either by impartial justice or by overwhelming force.

=== Alliance with Spain ===
The Treaty of London is often regarded as Wolsey's finest moment, but it was abandoned within a year. Wolsey developed links with Charles in 1520 at the Field of the Cloth of Gold. At the Calais Conference Wolsey signed the Secret Treaty of Bruges (1521) with Charles V, stating that England would join Spain in a war against France if France refused to sign the peace treaty and ignored the Anglo-French treaty of 1518. Wolsey's relationship with Rome was also ambivalent. Despite his links to the papacy, Wolsey was strictly Henry's servant. Though the Treaty of London was an elaboration on Pope Leo's ambitions for European peace, it was seen in Rome as a vain attempt by England to assert her influence over Europe and steal some papal thunder. Furthermore, Wolsey's peace initiatives prevented a crusade to the Holy Land, which was the catalyst for the Pope's desire for European peace.

Cardinal Lorenzo Campeggio, who represented the Pope at the Treaty of London, was kept waiting for many months in Calais before being allowed to cross the Channel and join the festivities in London in what may have been a display by Wolsey of his independence of Rome. An alternative hypothesis is that Campeggio was kept waiting until Wolsey received his legacy, thus asserting Wolsey's attachment to Rome.

Though the English gain from the wars of 1522–23 was minimal, their contribution certainly aided Charles V in his defeat of the French, particularly in 1525 at the Battle of Pavia, where Charles's army captured Francis I. Henry then felt there was a realistic opportunity for him to seize the French crown, to which the kings of England had long laid claim. Parliament, however, refused to raise taxes. This led Wolsey to devise the Amicable Grant, which was met with even more hostility, and contributed to his downfall. In 1525, after Charles V had abandoned England as an ally, Wolsey began to negotiate with France, and the Treaty of the More was signed, during Francis I's captivity, with the Regent of France—his mother, Louise of Savoy.

The closeness between England and Rome can be seen in the formulation of the League of Cognac in 1526. Though England was not part of it, the League was organised in part by Wolsey with papal support. Wolsey's plan was that the League of Cognac, an alliance between France and some Italian states, would challenge Charles's League of Cambrai. This was both a gesture of allegiance to Rome and an answer to growing concerns about Charles's dominance over Europe.

The final blow to this policy came in 1529, when the French made peace with Charles. Meanwhile, the French also continued to honour the "Auld Alliance" with Scotland, stirring up hostility on England's border. With peace between France and the Emperor, there was no-one to free the Pope from Charles, who had effectively held Pope Clement VII captive since the Sack of Rome (1527). There was thus little hope of securing Henry VIII an annulment from his marriage to Charles's aunt Catherine of Aragon. Since 1527, Wolsey's desire to secure an annulment for his master had dictated his foreign policy, and by 1529 none of his endeavours had succeeded.

=== Annulment ===
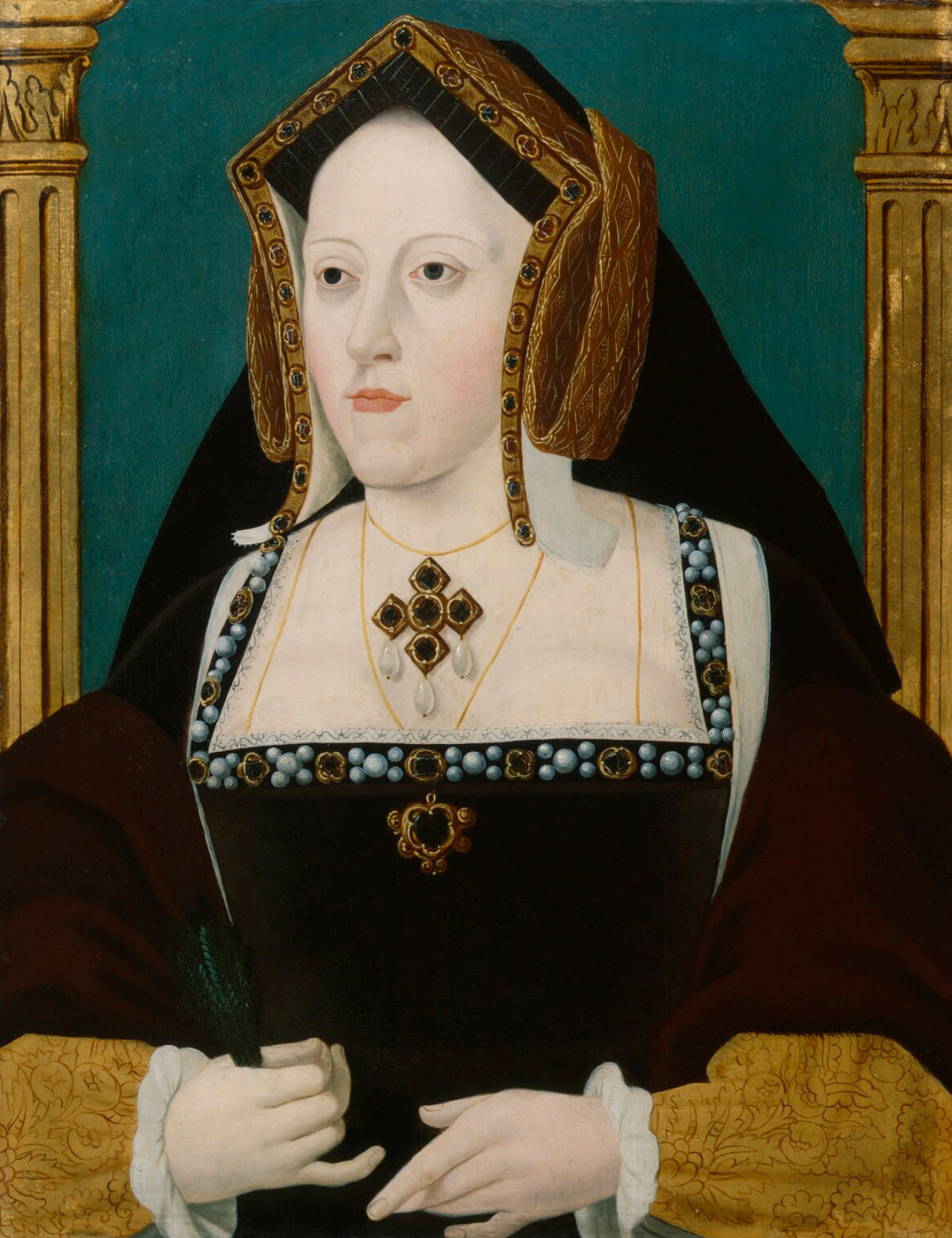
Queen Catherine of Aragon, by an unknown artist

Henry's marriage to Queen Catherine of Aragon had produced no sons who survived infancy; the Wars of the Roses were still within living memory, leading to the fear of a power struggle after Henry's death. Henry felt the people would accept only a male sovereign, not his daughter Mary. He believed God had cursed him for the sin of marrying the widow of his elder brother, and that the papal dispensation for that marriage was invalid because it was based upon the claim that Catherine was still a virgin after her first husband's death. Henry argued that Catherine's claim was not credible, and thus the dispensation must be withdrawn and the marriage annulled. His motivation has been attributed to his determination to have a son and heir, and to his desire for Anne Boleyn, one of his wife's maids-of-honour. Queen Catherine had no further pregnancies after 1519; Henry began annulment proceedings in 1527.

Catherine, however, maintained that she had been a virgin when she married Henry. Because she opposed annulment and a return to her previous status as Dowager Princess of Wales, the annulment request became a matter of international diplomacy, with Catherine's nephew Charles V pressuring Clement not to annul the marriage. Clement faced a dilemma: he would anger either Charles or Henry. He delayed his decision as long as possible, infuriating Henry and Anne Boleyn, who began to doubt Wolsey's loyalty to the Crown over the Church.

Wolsey appealed to Clement for an annulment on three fronts. First, he tried to convince the Pope that the dispensation was void as the marriage clearly disobeyed instructions in the book of Leviticus. Second, Wolsey objected to the dispensation on technical grounds, claiming it was incorrectly worded. (Shortly afterwards, a correctly worded version was found in Spain.) Third, Wolsey wanted Clement to let the final decision be made in England, which, as papal legate, he would supervise.

In pursuing these negotiations, Wolsey also relied on Gregorio Casali, Henry's resident representative at the papal court. Casali worked with several members of his family in Italy, including his brothers and cousins, forming a network through which the English government could maintain contacts at the Curia, gather information and conduct diplomatic business; his brother Giambattista Casali represented Henry in Venice.

In 1528 Clement decided to allow two papal legates to decide the outcome in England: Wolsey and Campeggio. Wolsey was confident of the decision, but Campeggio took a long time to arrive, and when he finally did, he delayed proceedings so much that the case had to be suspended in July 1529, effectively sealing Wolsey's fate.

== Domestic achievements ==
During his 14 years as chancellor, Wolsey had more power than any other Crown servant in English history. This led to his being hated by much of the nobility, who believed that power should be theirs. The king protected him from being attacked. As long as he was in the king's favour, Wolsey had great freedom in domestic matters, and had his hand in nearly every aspect of them. For much of the time, Henry VIII had complete confidence in him, and as Henry's interests inclined more towards foreign policy, he was willing to give Wolsey free rein in reforming the management of domestic affairs, for which Wolsey had grand plans. Historian John Guy explains Wolsey's methods:

Only in the broadest respects was [the king] taking independent decisions. ... It was Wolsey who almost invariably calculated the available options and ranked them for royal consideration; who established the parameters of each successive debate; who controlled the flow of official information; who selected the king's secretaries, middle-ranked officials, and JPs; and who promulgated decisions himself had largely shaped, if not strictly taken.

— Guy 1988, p. 87

Operating with the king's firm support, and with special powers over the church given by the Pope as legate, Wolsey dominated civic affairs, administration, the law, the church, and foreign policy. He was amazingly energetic and far-reaching. He built a great fortune for himself and was a major benefactor of arts, humanities and education. He projected numerous reforms, with some success in areas such as finance, taxation, educational provision and justice. From the king's perspective, his greatest failure was an inability to get a divorce when Henry wanted a new wife to give him a son who would be the undisputed heir to the throne. Historians agree that Wolsey was a man dogged by other men's failures and his own ambition. In the end, abandoned by the king, Wolsey was charged with treason, but died of natural causes before he could be beheaded.

=== Taxation ===
Wolsey made changes to the taxation system, devising, with treasurer of the Chamber John Heron, the "Subsidy". This form of tax was based upon accurate valuations of the taxpayer's wealth, where one shilling was taken per pound from the income. The old fixed tax of 15ths and 10ths meant that those who earned very little had to pay almost as much as the wealthy. With the new income tax the poorer members of society paid much less. This more progressive form of taxation enabled Wolsey to raise enough money for the king's foreign expeditions, bringing in over £300,000. He also raised considerable capital through other means, such as "benevolences", and enforced loans from the nobility, which yielded £200,000 in 1522. Ultimately, Wolsey's fiscal policy became increasingly disliked- his forced loans and benevolences culminated in the Amicable Grant (1525). This was met with hostility as the Amicable Grant provoked "full-scale revolt in Suffolk ... the most serious rebellion since 1497" (Cornish rebellion).

=== Justice ===
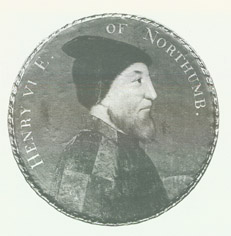
Henry Percy, the 6th Earl of Northumberland

As a legal administrator, Wolsey reinvented the equity court, where the verdict was decided by the judge on the principle of "fairness". As an alternative to the Common Law courts, Wolsey re-established the position of the prerogative courts of the Star Chamber and the Court of Chancery. The system in both courts concentrated on simple, inexpensive cases, and promised impartial justice. He also established the Court of Requests (although this court was only given this name later on) for the poor, where no fees were required. Wolsey's legal reforms were popular, and overflow courts were required to attend to all the cases. Many powerful men who had felt invincible under the law found themselves convicted; for example, in 1515, the Earl of Northumberland was sent to Fleet Prison and in 1516 Lord Abergavenny was accused of maintaining a larger armed retinue than legally permitted.

Wolsey also used his courts to tackle national controversies, such as the pressing issue of enclosures. The countryside had been thrown into discord by the entrepreneurial actions of landlords enclosing areas of land and converting from arable farming to pastoral farming, requiring fewer workers. The Tudors valued stability, and the resulting mass urban migration represented a serious crisis. Wolsey conducted national enquiries into enclosures in 1517, 1518 and 1527. In the course of his administration, he used the Court of Chancery to prosecute 264 landowners, including peers, bishops, knights, religious heads, and Oxford colleges. Enclosures were seen as directly linked to rural unemployment and depopulation, vagrancy, food shortages and, accordingly, inflation. This pattern repeated in many of Wolsey's other initiatives, particularly his quest to abolish enclosure. Despite spending significant time and effort investigating the state of the countryside and prosecuting numerous offenders, Wolsey freely surrendered his policy during the parliament of 1523 to ensure that Parliament passed his proposed taxes for Henry's war in France. Enclosures remained a problem for many years.

Wolsey used the Star Chamber to enforce his 1518 policy of Just Price, which attempted to implement price controls on food in urban markets. Those found to be charging too much were prosecuted by the Chamber. After the bad harvest of 1527, Wolsey bought up surplus grain and sold it off cheaply to the needy. This greatly eased disorder and became common practice after a disappointing harvest.

=== Church reforms ===
In 1524 and 1527 Wolsey used his powers as papal legate to dissolve 30 decayed monasteries where monastic life had virtually ceased in practice, some in Ipswich and Oxford. He used the income to found a grammar school in Ipswich (The King's School, Ipswich) and Cardinal College in Oxford (in 1532, after Wolsey's fall, the king renamed it King Henry VIII's College; it is now known as Christ Church). In 1525, as a result of his dissolution of Bayham Old Abbey in Kent, it led to a riot where local villagers occupied the Abbey and restored the canons before being removed after a week. In 1528 he began to limit the benefit of clergy. He also attempted, as legate, to force reform on monastic orders like the Augustinian canons.

Wolsey died five years before Henry's dissolution of the monasteries began.

=== Relationships ===
Wolsey's power depended on maintaining good relations with Henry. He grew increasingly suspicious of the "minions"—young, influential members of the Privy chamber—particularly after infiltrating one of his own men into the group. He attempted many times to disperse them from court, giving them jobs that took them to the Continent and far from Henry. After the Amicable Grant failed, the minions began to undermine him again. Consequently, Wolsey devised a grand plan of administrative reforms, incorporating the notorious Eltham ordinances of 1526. This reduced the members of the Privy Council from 12 to 6, removing Henry's friends such as Sir William Compton and Nicholas Carew.

One of Wolsey's greatest impediments was his lack of popularity amongst the nobles at court and in Parliament. Their dislikes and mistrusts partly stemmed from what they saw as Wolsey's excessive demands for money in the form of the Subsidy or benevolences. They also resented the Act of Resumption of 1486, by which Henry VII had resumed possession of all lands granted by the crown since 1455. These lands had passed onto his heir, Henry VIII. Many nobles resented the rise to power of a low-born man, whilst others simply disliked that he monopolised the court and concealed information from the Privy Council.

When mass riots broke out in East Anglia, which should have been under the control of the Dukes of Norfolk and Suffolk, Henry was quick to denounce the Amicable Grant, and began to lose faith in Wolsey. During the relatively peaceful period in England after the War of the Roses, its population increased. With more demand for food and no additional supply, prices increased. Landowners were forced to enclose land and convert to pastoral farming, which brought in more profit. Wolsey's quest against enclosure was fruitless in terms of restoring economic stability.

The same can be said for Wolsey's legal reforms. After he made justice accessible to all and encouraged more people to bring cases to court, the system was abused. The courts became overloaded with incoherent, tenuous cases, which would have been far too expensive to have rambled on in the Common Law courts. Wolsey eventually ordered all minor cases out of the Star Chamber in 1528. The result of this venture was further resentment by the nobility and the gentry.

=== Art patronage ===
From 1515, when he became cardinal, until his death, Wolsey used art and architecture to underpin his positions. He initiated a building campaign on a scale not only unprecedented for an English churchman and Lord Chancellor, but also exceeded by few English kings. In so doing, he brought Italian Renaissance ideas, classical embellishments, and architectural models into English architecture. Scholars generally cite Somerset House in London (1547–1552) as the first classical building in England, built for Edward Seymour, the first Duke of Somerset and Lord Protector to King Edward VI. But Wolsey embraced Italian-inspired classicism nearly half a century before Seymour, though more theoretically than visually. Wolsey's subsequent disgrace over his failure to garner papal approval of an annulment of Henry VIII's marriage to Catherine of Aragon has clouded the fact that he was not only the first high-profile patron in England to seek out and promote Italian classicism in art, architecture, and magnificence, but also that his contributions endured.

Among Wolsey's projects were lavish, classically inspired additions to York Palace in London, the Archbishop of York's residence. He supervised the grandiose temporary buildings at the Field of Cloth of Gold and renovated Hampton Court, which he later relinquished to the king. Wolsey's use of architecture as a symbol of power, along with his introduction of Italian classical ornamentation, set a trend continued by Henry VIII and others. Wolsey oversaw tombs for Henry's VIII's parents at Westminster Abbey and negotiated contracts for Henry VIII's tomb as well as one for himself. If these works had been completed as planned, they would be among Europe's largest, most elaborate, and grandest tombs. The college originally founded and planned by Wolsey and refounded by Henry VIII (Christ Church) remains the largest and grandest of all Oxford colleges.

=== Failures with the Church ===
As well as his State duties, Wolsey simultaneously attempted to exert his influence over the Church in England. As cardinal and, from 1524, lifetime papal legate, Wolsey continually vied for control over others in the Church. His principal rival was William Warham, the Archbishop of Canterbury, who made it more difficult for Wolsey to follow through with his plans for reform. Despite making promises to reform the bishoprics of England and Ireland, and, in 1519, encouraging monasteries to embark on a programme of reform, he did nothing to bring about these changes.

== Downfall and death ==
In spite of having many enemies, Wolsey retained Henry VIII's confidence until Henry decided to seek an annulment of his marriage to Catherine of Aragon so that he could marry Anne Boleyn. Wolsey's failure to secure the annulment directly caused his downfall and arrest. It was rumoured that Anne Boleyn and her faction convinced Henry that Wolsey was deliberately slowing proceedings; as a result, he was arrested in 1529, and the Pope decided that the official decision should be made in Rome, not England.

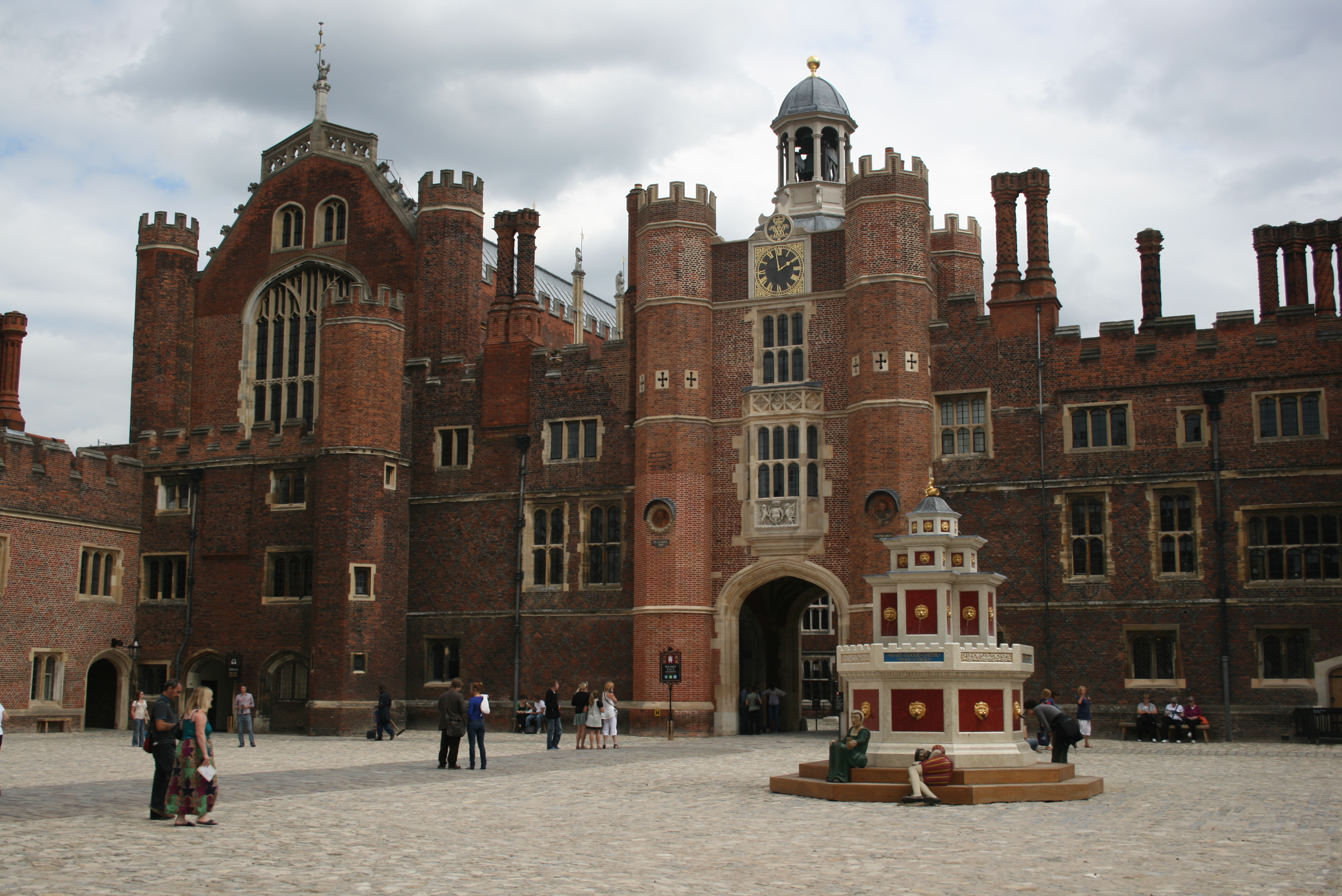
Hampton Court Palace, London

In 1529, Wolsey was stripped of his government office and property, including his magnificently expanded residence of the Palace of Whitehall, which Henry took to replace the Palace of Westminster as his own main London residence. Wolsey was permitted to remain Archbishop of York. He travelled to Yorkshire for the first time in his career, but when he was staying at one of the Archbishop's residences, Cawood Castle in north Yorkshire, he was accused of treason and ordered to London by Henry Percy, 6th Earl of Northumberland.

In great distress, Wolsey left Cawood Castle on the evening of 7 November 1530. He lodged at Pomfret Abbey in Pontefract that night and the following day made it to Sheffield Manor Lodge, where he spent the next 14 days hosted by George Talbot, 4th Earl of Shrewsbury.

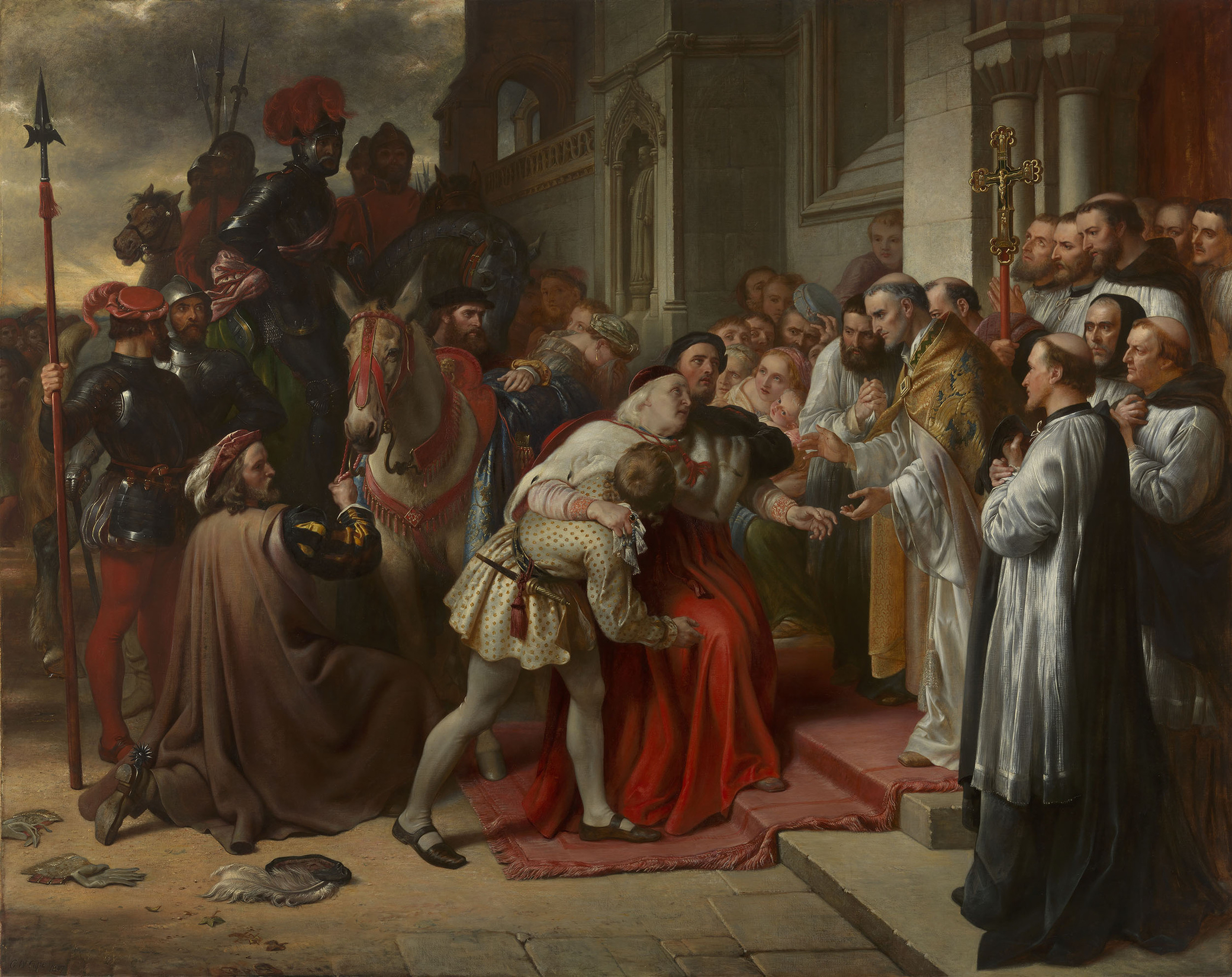
Cardinal Wolsey at the Gate of Leicester Abbey by Charles West Cope, 1847

At Sheffield, Wolsey fell seriously ill with dysentery. Taken into custody by Sir William Kingston, Constable of the Tower, Wolsey left for Hardwick Hall on 25 November. He was so ill that Kingston's guards believed Wolsey to be dying, and wept openly. Spending the night in the city of Nottingham, Wolsey proceeded to Leicester Abbey in the city of Leicester. He was so weak, he could barely sit on his mule. He reached the abbey on the evening of 27 November, and had to be carried upstairs.

Wolsey remained in bed the next day, his health rapidly failing. He began to lose his sight, and repeatedly lost consciousness the night of 28 to 29 November. He made confession at 7 a.m. on 29 November, and died an hour later.

Wolsey was buried in a simple pine coffin, dressed in his episcopal robes and with his cross, mitre, and ring. He lay in state at the abbey until 5 p.m. on 29 November, after which his body was moved to the abbey church. The funeral Mass was sung at 4 a.m. on 1 December, and he was buried two hours later.

Leicester Abbey was turned over to William Cavendish after the dissolution of the monasteries. His son tore down the abbey, and the site of Wolsey's burial was lost. (The site of the former abbey is now Abbey Park.)

In keeping with his practice of erecting magnificent buildings at Hampton Court, Westminster and Oxford, Wolsey had planned a magnificent tomb at Windsor by Benedetto da Rovezzano and Giovanni da Maiano. Henry VIII contemplated using the impressive black sarcophagus for himself, but Lord Nelson now lies in it, in the crypt of St. Paul's Cathedral.

Henry often receives credit for artistic patronage that properly belongs to Wolsey.

== Mistress and issue ==
Wolsey lived in a "non-canonical" marriage for around a decade with a woman called Joan Larke of Yarmouth, Norfolk. The edict that priests, regardless of their functions or the character of their work, should remain celibate had not been wholeheartedly accepted in England.

Wolsey had two children, both before he was made bishop: a son, Thomas Wynter (born circa 1510), and a daughter, Dorothy (born circa 1512), both of whom lived to adulthood. The son was sent to live with a family in Willesden and tutored in his early years by Maurice Birchinshaw. He later married and had children of his own. Dorothy was adopted by John Clansey, and was in due course placed in the convent at Shaftesbury Abbey. Following the dissolution of the monasteries under Thomas Cromwell she was awarded a pension.

Following his rapid promotion, Larke became a source of embarrassment to Wolsey, who arranged for her marriage to George Legh of Adlington, Cheshire, circa 1519. He provided the dowry. Henry VIII had a mansion built for Legh at Cheshunt Great House.

== Fictional portrayals ==
- Wolsey plays a major role in the early stages of the Autobiography of Henry VIII by Margaret George.
- Wolsey is the primary antagonist of William Shakespeare's Henry VIII, which depicts him as an arrogant power-grabber. Henry Irving, Walter Hampden and John Gielgud were well known for their stage performances of the role, and Timothy West played him in the 1979 BBC Television Shakespeare production of that play. Henry Irving's reading of Wolsey's Farewell survives on a rare wax cylinder recording.
- Wolsey is a minor but important character in Robert Bolt's play A Man for All Seasons; he was played in the two film versions of the play by Orson Welles (1966) and John Gielgud (1988), respectively.
- Wolsey was portrayed somewhat more sympathetically in the film Anne of the Thousand Days (1969), a performance that earned Anthony Quayle an Academy Award nomination.
- Wolsey was played by John Baskcomb in The Six Wives of Henry VIII (1970) and by John Bryans when the series was made into the film Henry VIII and His Six Wives (1972).
- David Suchet plays Wolsey in the 2003 two-part television serial Henry VIII with Ray Winstone.
- Terry Scott portrayed a comical Wolsey in Carry On Henry (1970).
- William Griffis played Wolsey in the Broadway musical Rex (1976), which starred Nicol Williamson as Henry.
- In the Showtime series The Tudors (2007), Sam Neill plays Wolsey. This production interprets his death as suicide by cutthroat, covered up by the king and Cromwell out of residual affection for him.
- Roger Ashton-Griffiths portrays Wolsey in David Starkey's 2009 documentary series Henry VIII: The Mind of a Tyrant.
- Wolsey is one of the main characters in Hilary Mantel's novel Wolf Hall (2009), played by Paul Jesson in the RSC production and by Jonathan Pryce in the first and second television series. He is portrayed through Cromwell's eyes as a mentor and a ruthlessly loyal statesman. A desire to avenge Wolsey's downfall and ignominious death fuels many of Cromwell's actions through the latter half of Wolf Hall and its sequel Bring Up the Bodies, which was incorporated into the stage and television adaptations.
- In the TVE series Carlos, rey emperador (2015), he is portrayed by Blai Llopis.
- Wolsey appears in The White Princess, STARZ, Season 1, Episode 8 (2017), played by Mark Edel-Hunt.
- Philip Cumbus portrays Wolsey in The Spanish Princess, a sequel to The White Princess.
- Turton, NJ, Wolsey's Wife, Vanguard Press, an imprint of Pegasus Elliot Mackenzie Publishers, Ltd. (2025) ISBN 978-1-83671-004-2

== Memorials ==
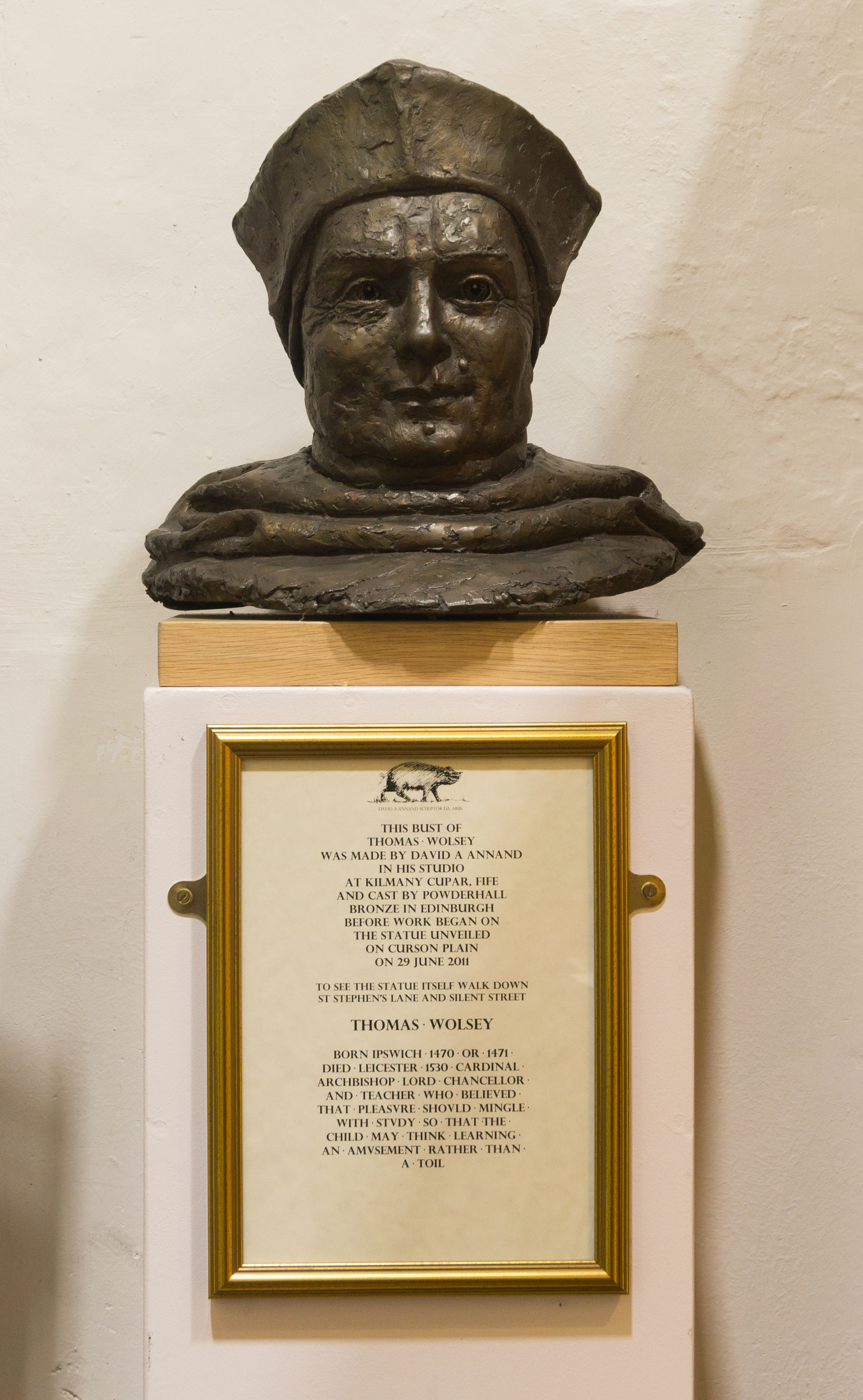
Bust of Wolsey at St Stephen's Church, Ipswich

Before Wolsey was removed from power, he planned to make his home town of Ipswich a seat of learning. He built a substantial college, which for two years, 1528–1530, was parent of the Queen Elizabeth School or Ipswich School, which today flourishes on another site. All that remains of Wolsey's structure is the former waterside gate, figured by Francis Grose in his Antiquities, which can still be seen on College Street.

In 1930 Wolsey was commemorated in Ipswich with a pageant play.

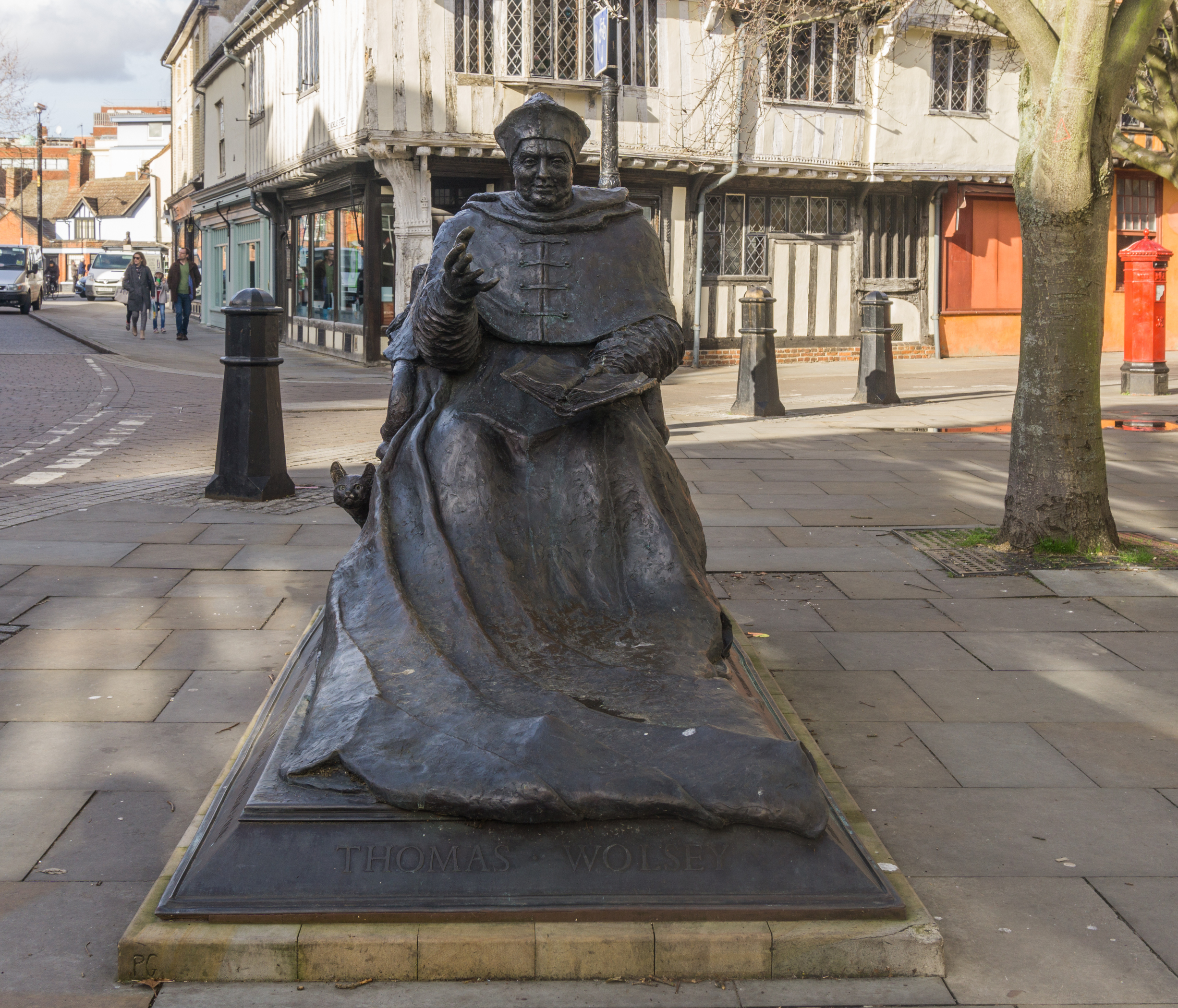
Bronze statue of Wolsey in St Nicholas Street, Ipswich

An appeal was launched in 2009 to erect a permanent memorial to Wolsey in Ipswich. This led to the commissioning of a more-than-life-sized bronze statue from sculptor David Annand. Wolsey is shown seated and facing south towards St Peter's Church (the former medieval Augustinian priory church, which he annexed as the chapel of his college), teaching from a book, and with a cat at his side. The statue was unveiled in June 2011, when it was dedicated by the Bishop of St Edmundsbury and Ipswich, and launched in a civic capacity by the Mayor of Ipswich.

Another statue of Wolsey stands in Leicester's Abbey Park close to the site of his burial. It was donated by the Wolsey hosiery company, a major employer in the city and also named after the cardinal.

== Other ==
Cardinal Wolsey's bust was used in the 1980s above the London Transport roundel on London's buses in west and south-west London as the symbol of the Cardinal bus district, which was named after him and his residence at Hampton Court.

Carlos Logario, a Spanish doctor practising in England, was the doctor to Thomas Wolsey.

== Arms ==
Coat of arms of Thomas Wolsey
Notes Cardinal Wolsey's arms were granted to him by the College of Arms in 1525. They are now used by Christ Church, Oxford. Adopted 4 August 1525 Escutcheon Sable, on a cross engrailed argent a lion passant gules between four leopards' faces azure; on a chief Or a rose gules barbed vert and seeded or between two Cornish choughs proper Symbolism The silver cross is derived from the arms of the Ufford Earls of Suffolk, and the four leopards' faces from the de la Pole Earls and Dukes of Suffolk, Wolsey being a Suffolk native. The Cornish choughs, or "beckets" as they are sometimes known, are a reference to Wolsey's namesake, Thomas Becket. The red lion symbolises Wolsey's patron, Pope Leo X, while the rose symbolises his king, Henry VIII.

Political offices
Preceded by William Warham	Lord Chancellor; 1515–1529	Succeeded by Sir Thomas More
Catholic Church titles
Preceded by William Smyth	Bishop of Lincoln; 1514	Succeeded by William Atwater
Preceded by Christopher Bainbridge	Archbishop of York; 1514–1530	Succeeded by Edward Lee
Preceded by Adriano Castellesi	Bishop of Bath and Wells; 1518–1522	Succeeded by John Clerk
Preceded by Thomas Ruthall	Bishop of Durham; 1523–1529	Succeeded by Cuthbert Tunstall
Preceded by Richard Foxe	Bishop of Winchester; 1529–1530	Succeeded by Stephen Gardiner
