= Allan Fung =

American politician (born 1970)

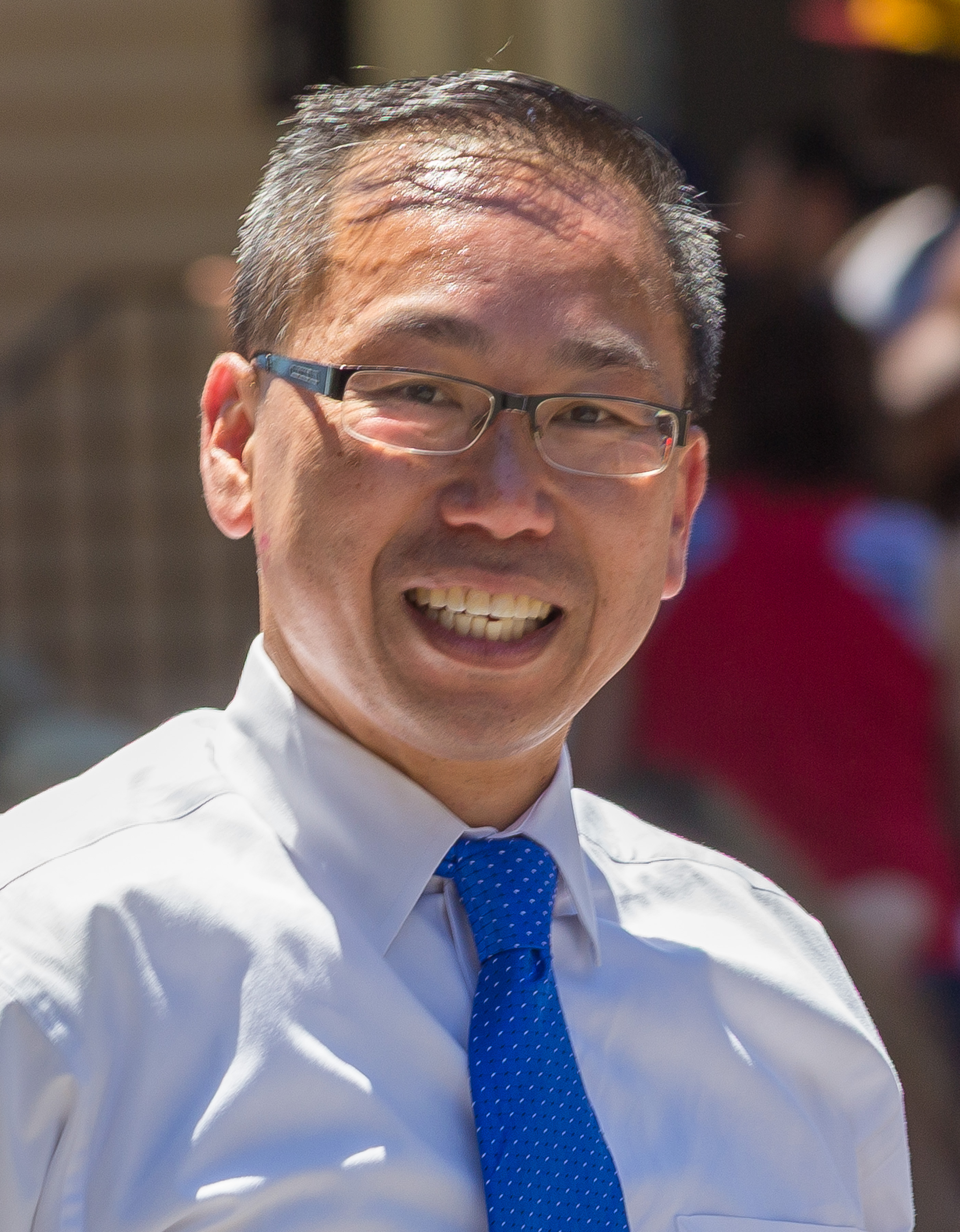
- Fung in 2017

Mayor of Cranston, Rhode Island
- In office January 5, 2009 – January 4, 2021
- Preceded by: Michael Napolitano
- Succeeded by: Kenneth Hopkins

Personal details
- Born: Allan Wai-Ket Fung; February 25, 1970 (age 56) Providence, Rhode Island, U.S.
- Party: Independent (2026–present)
- Other political affiliations: Republican (until 2026)
- Spouse: Barbara Fenton (m. 2016)
- Education: Rhode Island College (BA); Suffolk University (JD)

Chinese name
- Traditional Chinese: 馮偉傑
Transcriptions
Standard Mandarin
- Hanyu Pinyin: Feng Weijie

Allan Wai-Ket Fung (born February 25, 1970) is an American attorney and politician who served as the mayor of Cranston, Rhode Island, from 2009 to 2021. Fung, who is of Chinese descent, was the first Chinese American mayor in Rhode Island. He was the Republican nominee for Governor of Rhode Island in the 2014 and 2018 elections as well as the Republican nominee for U.S. representative for Rhode Island's 2nd congressional district in 2022.

Before he was elected mayor in 2008, Fung was previously a state prosecutor and attorney on legislative and regulatory affairs before serving on the Cranston City Council as a city-wide councilman. In 2026, he disaffiliated from the Republican Party to run for election as an independent in the 15th district of the Rhode Island House of Representatives and subsequently won the seat.

== Early life and education ==
Allan W. Fung (Chinese: 馮偉傑), born on February 25, 1970, at Providence Lying-In Hospital (now known as Women & Infants Hospital), is the eldest of Kwong Wen and Tan Ping's three children. Crown colony Chinese immigrants from British Hong Kong, his family settled in Rhode Island in 1969, and ran a restaurant on Cranston Street and Gansett Avenue in Cranston, Rhode Island.

Fung graduated from Classical High School in Providence, Rhode Island, in 1988, in the same class as future Providence mayor Angel Taveras. In Fung's 2014 gubernatorial campaign, he disclosed that he had been involved in a fatal car crash in 1989. Fung said he lost consciousness and struck and killed James W. Skipper Jr., who had stopped on the side of the road to change a tire. Fung was charged in the incident but a grand jury did not indict him. Fung said he reached an out-of-court settlement with Skipper's family. He said no drugs or alcohol were involved in the incident.

Fung earned a Bachelor of Arts degree in political science from Rhode Island College in 1992 and a Juris Doctor from the Suffolk University Law School in 1995. He received the Classical High School Distinguished Alumni Award in 2009.

== Career ==
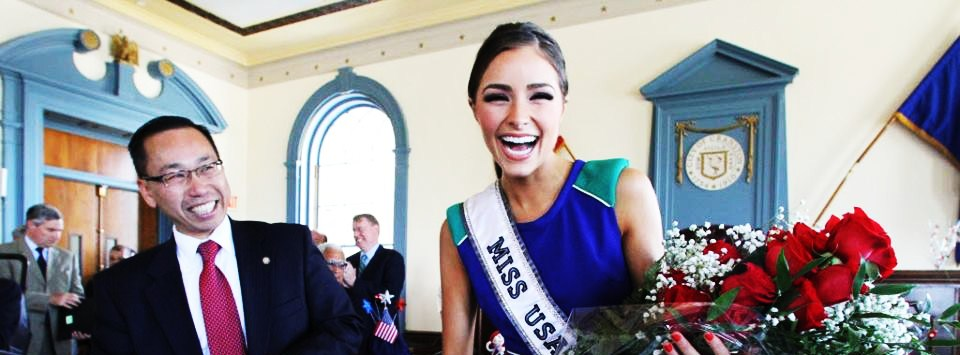
Fung honors Cranston resident Olivia Culpo with a key to the City, after her coronation as Miss USA 2012.

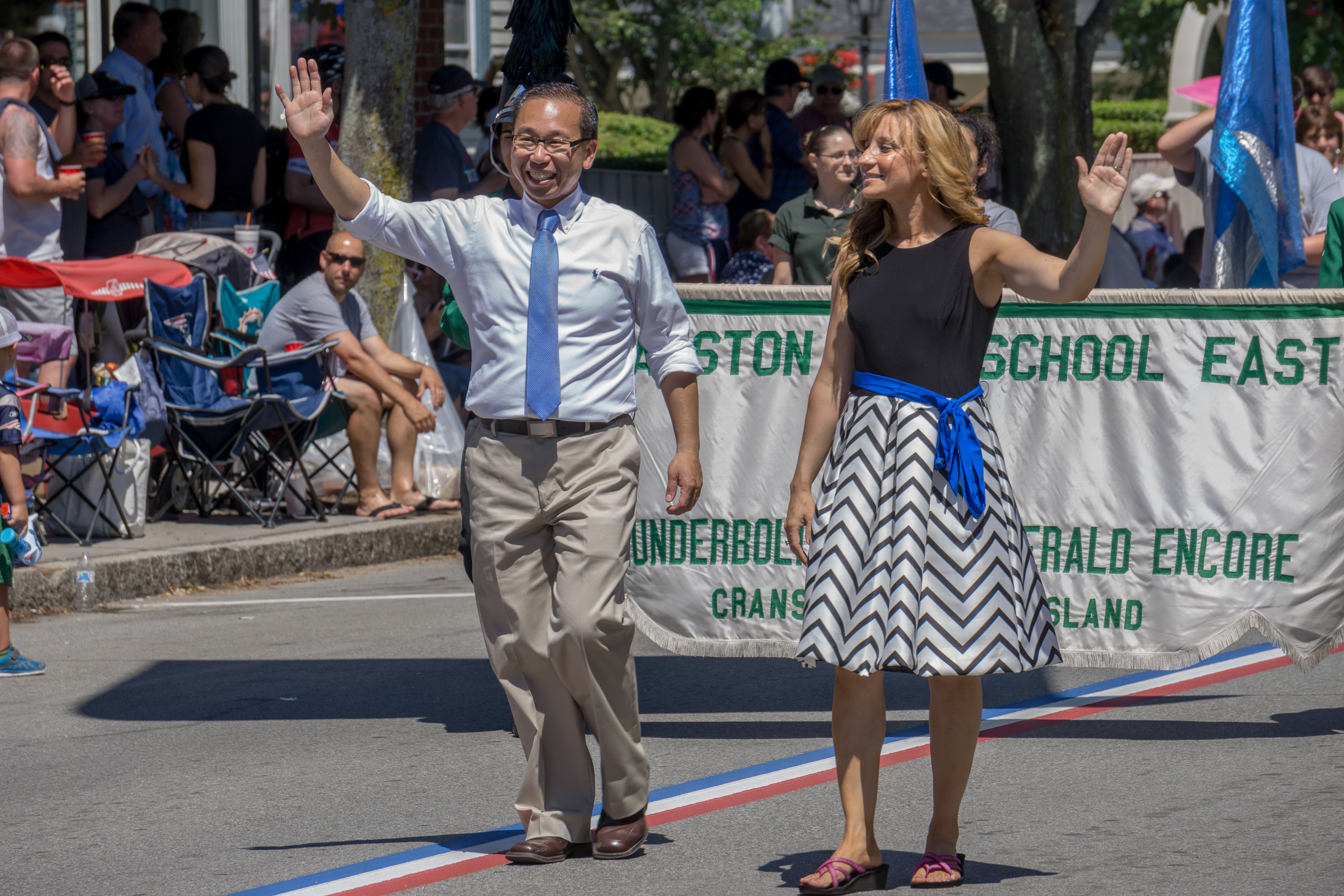
Fung marched in the 2016 Bristol Fourth of July Parade with his wife Barbara Ann Fenton

Prior to his municipal leadership career, from 1999 to 2001, Fung served as a prosecutor, acting as Special Assistant, for the Rhode Island Attorney General. Fung served from 2001 to 2009 as the government relations counsel for Metropolitan Life Insurance Company MetLife. In 2003, he was elected to the Cranston City Council. In 2004, Fung was honored as a Rhode Island Bar Foundation Fellow. He was also a Providence Business News 40 Under Forty honoree. Fung was chairman of the Rhode Island Governor's Insurance Council from 2005 to 2008.

A Republican, he was elected mayor in November 2008, beating Democrat Cynthia M. Fogarty by 63% to 37%. He is the first Chinese American elected as mayor in the state. He succeeded Michael Napolitano, who defeated him for the position in the 2006 election by 79 votes. Fung was re-elected in 2010 against Richard R. Tomlins by 76% to 24% and in 2012 against only write-in opponents by 97% to 3%. Fung is a council member for the Republican National Committee's Asian Pacific American Advisory Council.

Fung won re-election to a fourth term as Cranston mayor in November 2016, by a margin of 2 to 1.

Under Fung's leadership, Cranston became one of the Top 50 Cities to Live in America for three years in a row according to the website 24/7 Wall Street. Cranston, according to Alarms.com website, was also named one of the Top 100 Best Cities to Raise A Child in 2017.

Because of term limits established in 2012, Fung could not re-run for mayor in 2020 and instead endorsed Kenneth Hopkins, who went on to win the election against Democratic candidate Maria Bucci. On January 4, 2021, Fung planned to attend the inauguration of Hopkins and administer the oath, but instead tested positive for COVID-19 and immediately left Cranston's City Council chambers, the location where the ceremony was being held.

=== Gubernatorial campaigns ===
==== 2014 ====
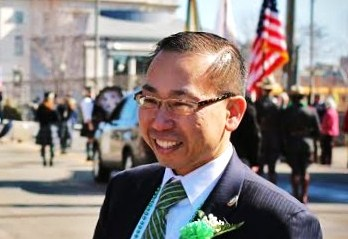
Fung in 2014

In November 2013, Fung announced his candidacy for Governor of Rhode Island in the 2014 election. He received several high-profile Republican endorsements during the campaign, including former Rhode Island Governor Lincoln Almond, former Massachusetts Governor and 2012 presidential nominee Mitt Romney and former Massachusetts Governor William Weld. On September 9, 2014, Fung defeated Ken Block in the Republican primary, with a 55% majority. Soon thereafter, the Republican Governors Association President also endorsed him. Democrat Gina Raimondo would go on to win the three-way contest 41% to 36% to 21%.

==== 2018 ====
In October 2017, Fung announced he would again seek the governorship, he captured the Republican nomination but went on to lose again Raimondo this time 53% to 37%

=== U.S. House campaign ===
In February 2022, Fung announced his candidacy for the Republican nomination for the United States House of Representatives in Rhode Island's 2nd congressional district after incumbent Democrat James Langevin announced his retirement. He won the nomination unopposed but lost to Democrat Seth Magaziner in the general election 50% to 47%, His defeat was considered an upset because it conflicted with polls.

=== Political positions ===
Fung describes himself as a "'Rhode Island Republican' – moderate, but fiscally conservative". An Eyewitness News political analyst described Fung as "a more moderate Republican". Fung says that he's a pragmatist and described himself as a centrist who promotes bipartisanship.

==== Fiscal policy ====
Fung identifies as fiscally conservative. Fung said he raised taxes during his first three years as mayor after "inheriting a fiscal mess". He did not raise taxes during his final three years as mayor. Running for governor, he pledged to cut the sales tax rate in Rhode Island. During a primary debate, he said he supported making Rhode Island a "right-to-work" state and noted that he switched some city employees from a public pension to private plans. During the 2018 gubernatorial campaign, Fung proposed reducing the sales tax to five percent, cutting fees, and introducing a concierge service for businesses. His proposed budget for Cranston in 2018 did not include a tax increase. Fung criticized giving health care subsidies to certain corporations, calling such a plan "corporate welfare". Also in 2018, Fung supported increasing city spending by $4.4 million; in 2017, he had supported a 2.2% tax increase.

For funding education, Fung supports charter schools and wants to increase funding for technical education.

==== Social policy ====
During his 2018 gubernatorial campaign, Fung described himself as pro-choice on the issue of abortion but "not extreme", and said he supported "common sense restrictions, such as his opposition to late-term abortion". He was endorsed by Rhode Island Right to Life, a group opposed to legal abortion because they supported the restrictions proposed by Fung. As governor, Fung said that he would consider Roe v. Wade to be the law of the land and would not change that. Fung later said he no longer identified as pro-choice but said he supports a "woman's right to make medical decisions" within some limitations. In 2018, Fung said "I have always respected a woman's right to make a medical decision, but with common sense limitations that many of us can agree upon, including a ban on the disgusting practice of late term abortions, having the option of a plan on the healthcare exchange that does not include abortion coverage, and parental notification for minors". In 2019, Fung endorsed a pro-choice Republican, Rebecca Schiff, who was running to be the state GOP chairwoman. In 2022, he described himself as neither pro-life nor pro-choice and said he was "not a labels-type person". Running for Congress, he said that he supports legal abortion "up to a certain time frame" during the second trimester with exceptions for later in a pregnancy for the health of the patient, rape, and incest. He stated he would oppose a national ban on abortion.

As Mayor of Cranston, Fung said he is "for civil unions but not same-sex marriage". In 2020, Fung participated in and supported LGBT pride events in Cranston, saying "We are very excited, once again to be here, in celebration of Pride Month." In 2022, he said "I am a supporter of the LGBTQ+ community" and that he "could support gay marriage" with protections for religious institutions that disagree with same-sex marriage.

In 2018, the NRA Political Victory Fund (NRA-PVF) gave Fung a 92% score, and an "A" grade in 2022. He was endorsed by the NRA for governor. In 2018, he opposed Rhode Island's "red flag" gun control executive order signed by the governor because it did not require input from mental health professionals.

In 2017, Fung opposed President Donald Trump's travel ban. He supports DACA and asked Cranston's city council to approve a resolution supporting his stance in favor of DACA. He supported the Gang of Eight immigration bill which would have enhanced border security and given a pathway to legal status and citizenship for illegal immigrants. Fung opposes issuing drivers' licenses to illegal immigrants. He also opposes sanctuary cities.

=== Rhode Island State House campaign ===
In June 2026, Fung announced that he filed to run for a Rhode Island House of Representatives seat in district 15 as an independent, challenging incumbent Republican Christopher Paplauskas and Democrat Colleen Crudele.

== Personal life ==
Fung met Barbara Ann Fenton, a physical therapist, at the 2012 Republican National Convention. They married in summer 2016. Fung converted to Catholicism before the wedding.

== Electoral history ==
2014 Rhode Island gubernatorial Republican primary
Party	Candidate	Votes	%
Republican	Allan Fung	17,530	54.9
Republican	Ken Block	14,399	45.1
Total votes		31,929	100.0

Rhode Island gubernatorial election, 2014
Party	Candidate	Votes	%	±%
Democratic	Gina Raimondo	131,899	40.70	+17.65
Republican	Allan Fung	117,428	36.24	+2.6
Moderate	Robert J. Healey	69,278	21.38	+14.91
Independent	Kate Fletcher	3,483	1.07	N/A
Independent	Leon Kayarian	1,228	0.38	N/A
Write-in		739	0.23	N/A
Turnout		324,055	100	N/A
Democratic hold				

2018 Rhode Island gubernatorial Republican primary results
Party	Candidate	Votes	%
Republican	Allan Fung	18,577	56.4
Republican	Patricia Morgan	13,208	40.1
Republican	Giovanni Feroce	1,147	3.5
Total votes		32,932	100.0

Rhode Island gubernatorial election, 2018
Party	Candidate	Votes	%	±%
Democratic	Gina Raimondo (incumbent)	198,122	52.6	+11.94
Republican	Allan Fung	139,932	37.1	+0.94
Independent	Joe Trillo	16,532	4.3	N/A
Moderate	Bill Gilbert	10,155	2.7	−18.6
Independent	Luis Daniel Muñoz	6,223	1.6	N/A
Compassion	Anne Armstrong	4,191	1.1	N/A
Write-in		1,246	0.3	+0.10%
Total votes		376,401	100.0	N/A
Democratic hold				

2022 Rhode Island's 2nd congressional district election
Party	Candidate	Votes	%
Democratic	Seth Magaziner	101,432	50.4
Republican	Allan Fung	93,969	46.7
Moderate	William Gilbert	5,489	2.7
Write-in		199	0.1
Total votes		201,089	100.0
Democratic hold			

== See also ==
- List of mayors of Cranston, Rhode Island

Party political offices
Preceded by John Robitaille (2010)	Republican nominee for Governor of Rhode Island; 2014, 2018	Succeeded by Ashley Kalus
