= San Pedro Bay (Chile) =

Bay in Osorno Province, southern Chile

Coordinates: 40°53′29.24″S 73°51′1.59″W

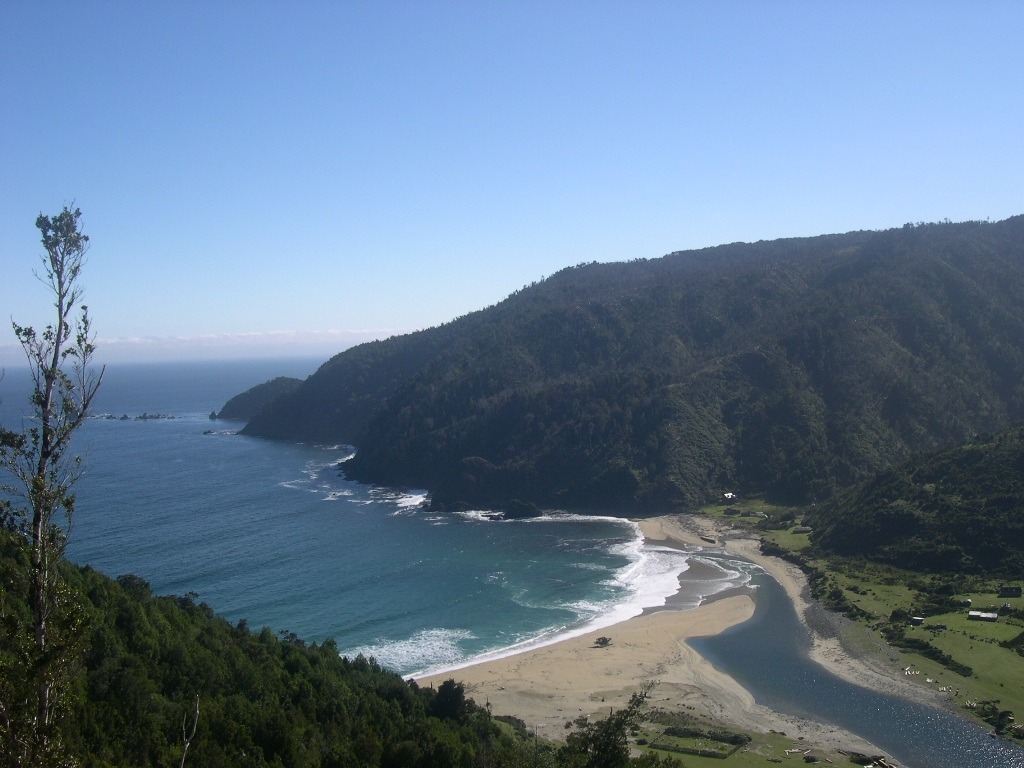
Caleta Manquemapu within the Manquemapu bay, hidden by the hill in foreground is the wreck of the Leucotón. Manquemapu River is right below of the image.

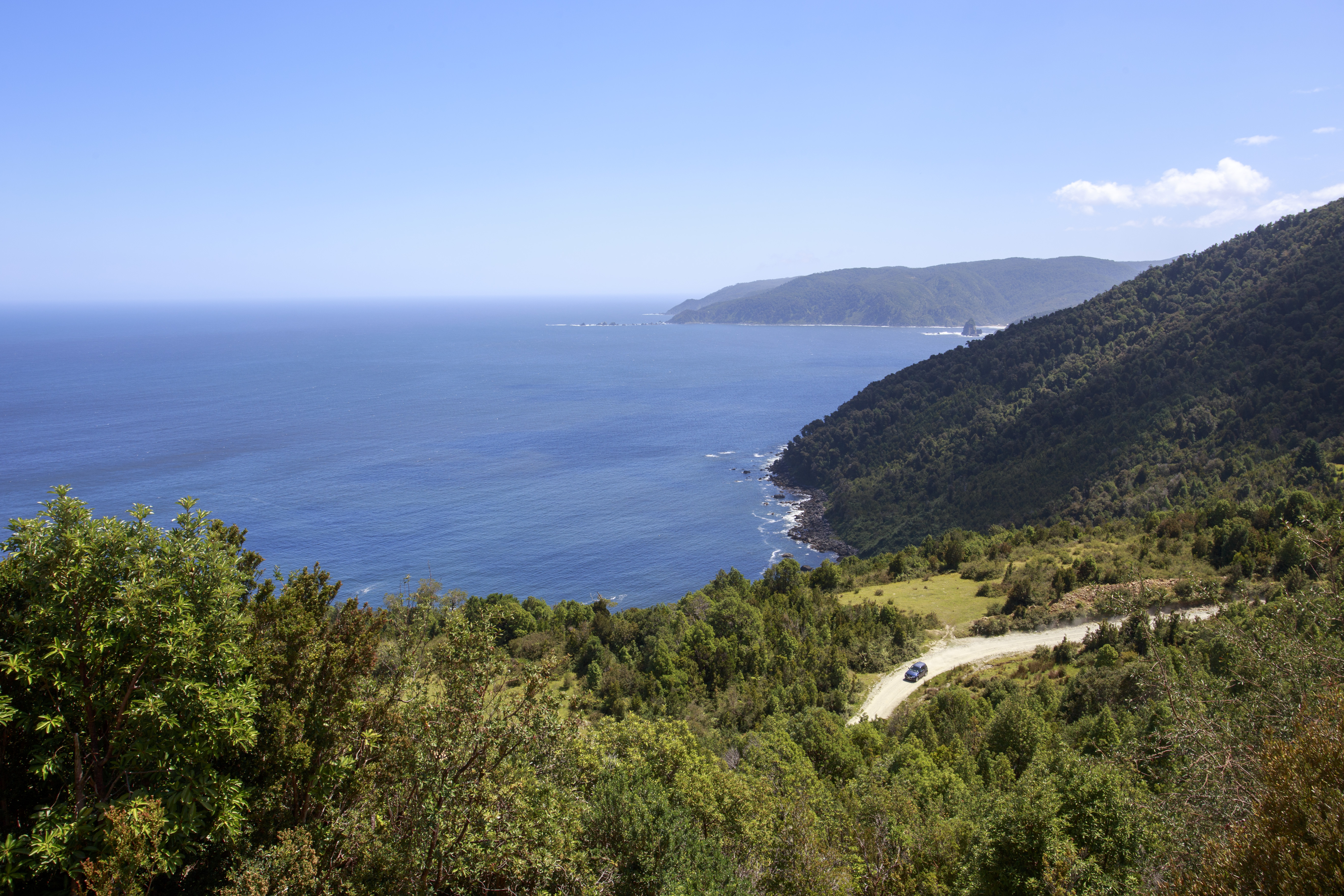
View of San Pedro Bay from the south.

San Pedro Bay (Spanish: Bahía San Pedro) is a bay in southern Chile located in the southern coast of Osorno Province. In 1965 the ships Janequeo and Leucoton sank in the bay. The bay has the form of a half-circle open to the west and has several small coves.

On September 18, 1544 twelve men of the expedition of Juan Bautista Pastene made landfall in San Pedro Bay, southern Chile, with Jerónimo de Alderete claiming the territory for the Governor of Chile and the King of Spain. The landfall was likely in what is today known as Caleta Guayusca. The Spanish captured two male and two female indigenous inhabitants as proof of their discovery. Thereafter, on the same day, the expedition sat sail to the north. The site Futawillimapu.org refers to this event as the beginning of the winka invasion.

== See also ==
- Bahía Mansa
- Maullín River
