= Kenneth Hopkins =

American politician

Ken Hopkins

Mayor of Cranston
- Incumbent
- Assumed office January 5, 2021
- Preceded by: Allan Fung

Personal details
- Born: August 29, 1954 (age 71) Providence, Rhode Island, U.S.
- Party: Republican
- Education: Community College of Rhode Island (attended); Rhode Island College (BA)

Kenneth J. Hopkins (born August 29, 1954) is an American Republican politician who is serving as the mayor of Cranston, Rhode Island, since 2021. He is a former Rhode Island councilman, having been elected in 2016.

== Sports career ==
Hopkins attended Johnston High School. He played basketball and baseball, receiving All-Division honors in the latter. He then attended Community College of Rhode Island from 1974 to 1976. He was a starting pitcher on the team, earning an 8–2 record and setting a single-season record with a 0.29 ERA. He then transferred to Rhode Island College, finishing with a 7–2 record with three saves and a 3.22 ERA in 78-1/3 innings pitched as an Anchorman.

Hopkins graduated from Rhode Island College in 1978. He then accepted a position at Our Lady of Providence High School, where he served as an assistant coach for the basketball and baseball team while also teaching history. He then taught at Cranston High School East for over a decade. He also coached for La Salle Academy and Johnston High School.

Hopkins left to coach baseball at the Community College of Rhode Island in 1981 as a pitching coach. He was promoted to interim head coach two years later, leading the team to a 20–7 record. He compiled a 68-62-2 record from 1985 to 1989. He then briefly retired from baseball until 2001. During his hiatus, Hopkins served as director of athletics for Cranston Public Schools.

He came out of retirement and proceeded to win four NJCAA Region XXI (New England) Division II championships and Coach of the Year awards in 2001, 2002, 2009 and 2012. He also led the team to a trip to the NJCAA Division II World Series. He also served as a teacher at Cranston East until his election to the city council in 2016.

== Political career ==
Hopkins served as a city councilman after taking office in fall 2016.

In 2020, Hopkins faced Council President Michael Farina in a GOP primary. He was endorsed by incumbent mayor Allan Fung. He faced Democratic candidate Maria A. Bucci, a former councilwoman, in the general election. Hopkins won approximately 54% of the vote in the general election. In 2022, he announced he was exploring a run for governor of Rhode Island in the 2022 Rhode Island gubernatorial election. The Boston Globe reported in 2023 that Hopkins' plans for the Budlong Pool, one of the country's largest outdoor municipal swimming pools, to be replaced with one around a third of the size had become a significant political issue in the city.

State representative Barbara Ann Fenton-Fung unsuccessfully challenged Hopkins in the Republican primary for the 2024 mayoral election. Early in the race, Hopkins was criticized by his political opponents because the city had hired all three of his children during his tenure as mayor; later that year, the Rhode Island Ethics Commission dismissed a complaint which accused Hopkins of nepotism in the hiring and promotion of his son-in-law in the city's fire department. Leading up to the primary election, in August, the Hopkins campaign mailed political ads that criticized Fenton-Fung's voting record; they were characterized by the Providence Journal as misleading. A local businessman also filed a lawsuit which accused Hopkins of taking an unregistered antique car from him, a claim that Hopkins denied. Hopkins was reelected to his second term after defeating Democratic candidate Robert Ferri in the general election.

== Personal life ==
Hopkins' late wife Mary died of cancer in December 2019.

== See also ==
- List of mayors of Cranston, Rhode Island
