= Carlos Logario =

Spanish physician

Carlos Logario was a Spanish doctor practising in England in the 16th century.

Logario was the doctor to Cardinal Wolsey, the chief minister of Henry VIII. A diarist, he recorded his opinions about London hospitals during the plague, and about the character of Hugh Latimer, who was burned at the stake for heresy in 1555. He also attended at the deathbed of William Compton.
