= Thomas Wynter =

English priest, supposed son of Thomas Wolsey

- Archdeacon of York
- Church: Church of England
- Diocese: Diocese of York
- In office: 1523–1540
- Predecessor: Hugh Ashton
- Successor: Thomas Westbie
- Other posts: Archdeacon of Cornwall (1537–1543); Provost of Beverley (1526–1540); Dean of Wells Cathedral (1526–1529); Archdeacon of Suffolk (1526–1529); Archdeacon of Richmond (1526–1529); Archdeacon of Suffolk (1526–1529)

Orders
- Ordination: never took major orders

Personal details
- Born: c. 1510
- Died: c. 1546
- Denomination: Roman Catholicism; Anglicanism
- Parents: Thomas Wolsey and Joan Larke
- Education: University of Leuven

Thomas Wynter or Winter (c. 1510 – c. 1546) was the son of Cardinal Thomas Wolsey by his mistress Joan Larke. Thanks to his father's patronage, Wynter held a number of lucrative ecclesiastical offices in England, including the Archdeacon of York, Richmond, Cornwall, Provost of Beverley and Dean of Wells Cathedral. Much of the revenue from these offices flowed into the hands of his father. Following Wolsey's death in 1530 Wynter was left without a protector and he was obliged to surrender many, though not all, of his positions in the church.

== Biography ==
=== Early life ===
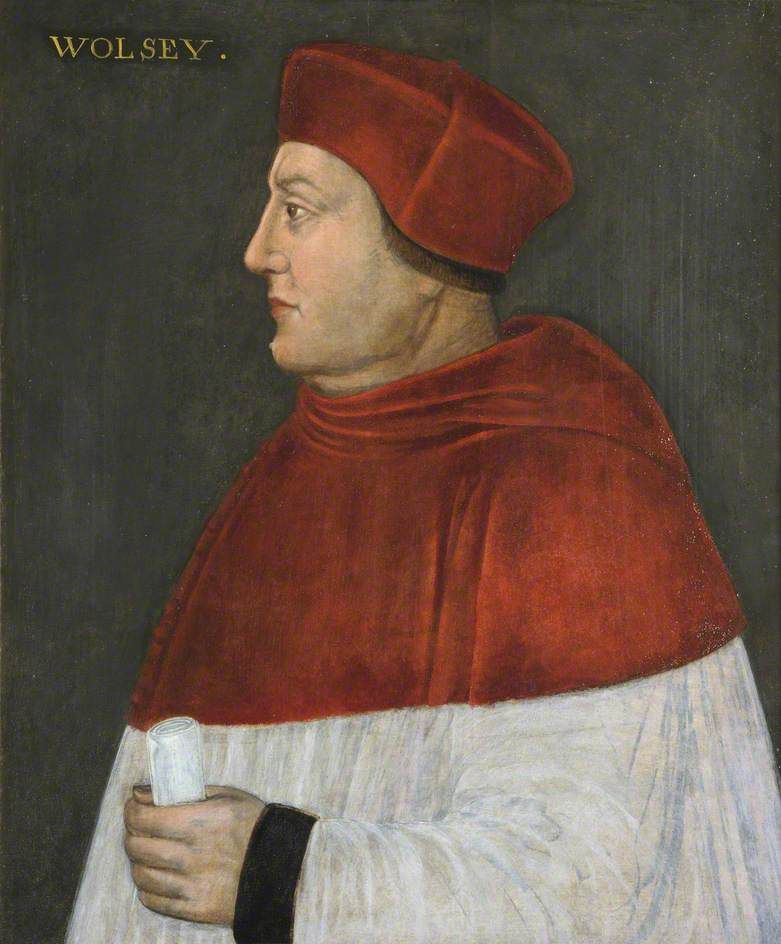
Thomas Wynter's likely father, Cardinal Thomas Wolsey

Thomas Wynter's exact date of birth is unknown, but most scholars argue that he was born sometime around the year 1510. His mother is the supposed mistress of Thomas Wolsey, Joan Larke, daughter of Thetford innkeeper Peter Larke. Some historians, such as Stella Fletcher, show some scepticism about Wynter's parentage, arguing that Wynter could be the son of one of Wolsey's siblings. (He had two brothers and a sister, who leave little trace in the historical record.) Most historians argue that Wynter was Wolsey's son because Wolsey had maintained a great interest in Wynter's education and career. Contemporary ambassadors and officials also believed Wynter was the cardinal's son, and stated as much in their correspondence. Thomas Lupset, a tutor of Wynter's, wrote to Erasmus in August 1525, stating that Wolsey treated Wynter with so much affection that it was as if "he were his own legitimate offspring." The Imperial ambassador Eustace Chapuys wrote to Emperor Charles V that "A son of [Wolsey's], who is in Paris following his studies, and of whom I have formerly written to your Majesty, has received orders to return," to England in October 1529. Similarly, the ambassador from Milan referred to Wynter as Wolsey's son in a dispatch the following year. Wynter supposedly grew up North of London in Willesden.

=== Education and Ecclesiastical career ===
In August 1518, at roughly age nine, Wynter matriculated to the University of Louvain. He studied Latin, among other elements of classical education, under his first known tutor, Maurice Birchinshaw. Within a few years, Wynter received dispensation to start holding clerical offices, and obtained three benefices by June 1522, including the lucrative prebend of Milton at Lincoln Cathedral. Wynter would go on to obtain several more benefices in England over the next few years, despite the fact that he was studying abroad almost constantly until 1529. He became Archdeacon of York on 31 August 1523, which he held longer than any other benefice, before surrendering it in June 1540. When his father, Wolsey, spoke of Wynter in his correspondence, he referred to him as the Dean of Wells, a position he received in January 1526.

=== Studies in Paris ===
Although Wynter studied in Paris with some of the best Humanists in Europe, he never showed any serious aptitude beyond normal intelligence. Wynter certainly made strong attempts at learning, attending public lectures, and often dedicating much of his time to studying. However, Wynter was instead a surrogate for his father's influence, as well as a source of income. Scholars in Paris praised Wynter partly for his own skills, but also for Wolsey's sake. Wynter would often entertain guests, and was forced to spend considerable sums of money on furniture and housing to befit the son of a Cardinal as important as Wolsey.

Besides his ecclesiastical income, Wynter also received the mineral rights to the bishopric of Durham, worth £185 per year, in 1528. In total, Wynter's lands and benefices were worth about £1,575 per year in 1525, and would be worth £2,700 per year in November 1529. Most of Wynter's income was siphoned off by Wolsey, who forwarded around £200 per year to Wynter in Paris, which helps explain Wynter's near constant requests for more money. Despite his son's less than stellar intellect, Wolsey continued to try and bestow greater honours on Wynter, including a failed attempt to secure the Diocese of Durham in 1528.

=== Nepotism ===
Historians have traditionally seen Wolsey's promotion of his son as an example of the corruption in late medieval Catholicism. Stanford Lehmberg called it the "most glaring example" of senior clergy granting their children benefices and skimming the profits. Recently, scholars more sympathetic to Wolsey and the Church argue that his actions were not unique for the period. Further, though there many prebends and benefices were held in pluralism, the parishioners of England were, for the most part, content with the state of the Church, and there were clergymen in the parishes to administer the sacraments.

Even so, Wolsey's decline from power beginning in 1528 only accelerated once Parliament wrote and submitted their formal protest against Wolsey in 1529. This included references to Wynter as recipient of "great treasures and riches" which Wolsey then acquired as a proxy. Wynter was in Paris at the time of his father's downfall, and King Henry VIII summoned Wynter to return, as it seemed likely that his father would die soon. Before his return to court in July 1530, Wynter resigned the majority of his benefices, though he kept his offices as the Archdeacon of York, Provost of Beverley, and a few other benefices.

=== Death of Wolsey ===
Cardinal Wolsey died in November 1530, and Wynter was left without a protector. He reached out and came under the patronage of two of the leading ministers in Henry VIII's government, Bishop Gardiner and his father's former protégé Thomas Cromwell. In 1530, Wynter joined the Doctors' Commons, a legal body whose members included such powerful figures as Sir Thomas More, Cuthbert Tunstall and Nicholas West. From there, Wynter went about raising funds to return to schooling on the continent.

By 1533, Wynter was studying law in Padua, Italy, thanks to his benefices and the generosity and influence of Cromwell. Wynter regularly wrote to Cromwell to update him on his studies, and to pass on whatever news or gossip he picked while meeting ambassadors and scholars from across Europe. Despite Cromwell's assistance and his benefices, Wynter could not reconcile his spending and his budget. Wynter wanted to maintain a life of a financially independent scholar, where wealth was "a great assistance to study and an ornament to life." Wynter stated his problem simply, as "I am devoted to letters but desire to keep my preferments," and by the end of 1533, he could not do both.

=== Return to England ===
Wynter returned to England and court in July 1534 in poverty. He managed to get an audience with Henry VIII and Queen Anne Boleyn, who took pity on Wynter. She told Wynter that he was beloved of the king, and that he had "many friends who wish you well. Reckon me among that number." Wynter remained in England for the next several years, resident at either Cawood Castle in his Archdeaconry of York, or Beverley where he still held the provostship. Wynter was eventually stable enough in England to have clients of his own, including Richard Morison and Edmund Harvel.

=== Archdeacon of Cornwall ===
Eventually, Cromwell was able to get a new preferment for Wynter in the southwest of England. On 10 October 1537 Wynter was installed by proxy as the Archdeaconry of Cornwall. As most of Wynter's lands and other property were in the East Riding of Yorkshire, he decided to rent out the Cornish archdeaconry to one William Bodye, a servant of Cromwell. Renting out the rights to hold archdeacon's courts, receive probate fees, and perform visitations was common in the sixteenth century, and many archdeacons were not resident. Unfortunately for Wynter, his flock in Cornwall came to despise Bodye, which would heighten tensions in the area for years to come.

Bodye purchased the rights to the archdeaconry for 35 years, for £30 per year, and a £150 down payment. Over the next three years, Bodye received the rents and fees due to Wynter, slowly building up a resentment among the parishioners and the resident clergy. In 1540, Bishop John Vesey of Exeter brought suit against Wynter, citing that Wynter had "indulged in prohibited games and in other things contrary to the office of an archdeacon", largely as a front to nullify the lease between Wynter and Bodye. Following this citation, Bodye was refused admittance into the Church in Cornwall and forcibly prevented from trying to collect payments from the parishioners. Bodye scuffled with John Harrys, the priest of the church, and threatened him with a knife. The chaos and lawsuits that followed lasted years as the people of Cornwall tried to remove Bodye, and Bodye sought to protect his rights. Besides bringing suits in Chancery and Star Chamber, Bodye managed to convince Cromwell and the king to order Vesey and the dean and chapter of Exeter to confirm the lease under their episcopal and chapter seals.

=== Litigation ===
Over the course of the unfolding events and lawsuits involving William Bodye, Wynter resigned his positions as archdeacon of York. Once the suits in Star Chamber settled in 1543, Wynter quietly resigned as archdeacon of Cornwall and provost of Beverly in exchange for a pension of £86 per year for the first five years, and diminishing to £30 per year after. Wynter after his resignations falls into some obscurity, despite being no older than thirty-five. He may be the same Thomas Wynter who possessed a small prebend in tenure of Thame Abbey in Saunderton, Buckinghamshire, in the first half of 1535. This Thomas Wynter held on to the prebend through the dissolution of the abbey, and had his ownership confirmed in 1546.

== List of Offices and Benefices ==
Office or Benefice	Date of Assumption	Date of Resignation
Canon and Prebend of Timsbury	Unknown	7 December 1529
Prebend of Bedwyn	25 March 1522	4 December 1529
Prebend of Milton Ecclesia	1 April 1522	1 December 1529
Prebend of Palishal at Overhall	2 June 1522	2 August 1522
Prebend of Norwell at Overhall	2 August 1522	before 12 December 1529
Prebend of Fridaythorpe	30 September 1522	9 January 1523
Prebend of Strensall	9 January 1523	20 December 1529
Archdeacon of York	31 August 1523	26 June 1540
Rector of Winwick	c. 1525	24 November 1529
Dean of Wells Cathedral	c. January 1526	before November 1529
Prebend of St Peter's, Beverley	before 28 February 1526	before 1535
Archdeacon of Richmond	24 March 1526	7 December 1529
Rector of St Matthew's Church, Ipswich	before 26 March 1526	before or c. 26 June 1528
Prebend of Lutton	before 26 March 1526	before November 1529
Prebend of Odiham	before 26 March 1526	c. February 1530
Chancellor of Diocese of Salisbury	before 26 March 1526	4 February 1530
Rector of Rudby	before 26 March 1526	after 7 April 1533
Provost of Beverley	before 26 March 1526	after July 1540
Archdeacon of Suffolk	12 November 1526	before 25 April 1529
Prebend of Rampton	after 30 October 1527	8 November 1540
Warden of St Leonard's Hospital, Tickhill	17 July 1528	11 December 1529
Archdeacon of Norfolk	before 23 August 1528	1 March 1530
Vicar of Atwick	before 1535	after or c. 1535
Vicar of Ratcliffe-on-Soar	before 1535	after or c. 1535
Prebend of Saunderton	before 1535	c. 1546
Archdeacon of Cornwall	8 October 1537	before 25 May 1543
