= Joan Larke =

Mistress of Thomas Wolsey

- Born: c. 1490; Yarmouth, Norfolk, England
- Died: c. 1532; London, England
- Known for: mistress of Cardinal Wolsey
- Spouses: George Legh; Sir George Paulet
- Children: (by Cardinal Wolsey): Very Rev Thomas Wynter; Sister Dorothy Clancey (by George Legh): Thomas Legh; Elizabeth Legh (Lady Barlow); Mary Legh; Ellen Legh
- Parent: Peter Larke

Joan Larke (c. 1490 – 1532) was the mistress of the powerful English statesman and churchman in the Tudor period, Thomas Wolsey, Archbishop of York, and mother of his two illegitimate children.

== Wolsey's mistress ==
Joan was born in about 1490 at Yarmouth, Norfolk, the daughter of Peter Larke, variously described as a Thetford innkeeper, common councilman of London or gentleman of Huntingdonshire, whose elder brother was Blessed John Larke. Her brother Canon Thomas Larke, dean of Bridgnorth, was chaplain to Wolsey. In about 1509, when Wolsey served as almoner to the new king Henry VIII of England, Joan became his mistress, living with him at Bridewell Palace. They had two children:

- Thomas Wynter (1510 – 1542), dean of Wells, and had issue.
- Dorothy Clancey (b. 29 September 1512), a nun.

Her son, Thomas, was sent to live with a family in Willesden, whilst her daughter, Dorothy, was adopted by John Clancey, alderman of Worcester, later entering Shaftesbury Abbey as a nun; she received a pension from Sir Thomas Cromwell when her religious house was later dissolved.

Sometime after Cardinal Wolsey's arrest and death in November 1530, Thomas Wynter went to Padua to read divinity, at the King's expense. When he returned penniless to England in about 1535, he was financially supported by Queen Anne Boleyn, Wolsey's former adversary.

== Marriages and children ==
As Wolsey continued to rise swiftly and prominently through Church and government ranks, eventually becoming Bishop of Lincoln, Archbishop of York, a Cardinal Prince of the Church of Rome, and Lord Chancellor of England, his relationship to Joan became a source of embarrassment to him. In 1519, he arranged her marriage to George Legh, squire of Adlington Hall, Cheshire, shortly after he had inherited the Adlington estate from his father Thomas Legh by his wife, Catherine, daughter of Sir John Savage. Wolsey provided her dowry and would later assist the Leghs in a property dispute; this ancient family of Cheshire extraction, variously spelled Leigh or Lee, also enjoyed privilege and patronage during the Tudor period.

Together Joan and George Legh had four children:

- Elizabeth or Isabel Legh (1525–1583), who married Sir Alexander Barlow.
- Thomas Legh (1527–1599), his heir, who married Maria Grosvenor (married secondly Sir Richard Egerton), by whom he had a son and heir, Thomas Legh (1547–1601), Sheriff of Cheshire.
- Mary Legh
- Ellen Legh

After George Legh died in 1529, his widow the following year married Sir George Paulet (knighted 1553), younger brother of the 1st Marquess of Winchester, KG, as his second wife.

Joan Paulet (née Larke) died in childbirth about two years later.

== See also ==
- Blessed John Larke (uncle)
- Leghs of Adlington
