= Hoyt W. Lark =

American politician

Hoyt Webb Lark (1893 – 1971) was a mayor of Cranston, Rhode Island.

== Personal life summary ==
Hoyt Webb Lark (married to Helen Crooker), of Cranston Rhode Island, was born in Onawa, Iowa, November 19, 1893. Hoyt attended the public schools in Onawa, Iowa (the Onawa Elementary School is now named on his behalf) and graduated from Grinnell College, Iowa, 1915 (A.B.); Harvard Law School, 1919 (LL.B) and admitted to the Rhode Island Bar, 1920. Served as 2nd lieutenant United States Army, World War I. Mayor of Cranston Rhode Island, 1945–1953. Hoyt died on May 1, 1971, at the age of 78 in Cranston Rhode Island.

== Mayoral term ==
Lark was Mayor of Cranston 1945–1953 and eventually was in contention for a seat in the U.S. Senate in the early 1950s. Lark had lost reelection because of controversial opinions and his attempts to confront mob activity in the Rhode Island business market. In a period in which illegal and underground activity was a prominent and significant source of revenue in the business sector, Lark's platform particularly focused on the elimination of illegal business ventures. As a result, many said he "turned too many heads" and "stepped on too many people's feet", leading to his eventual dismissal.

After losing re-election, Lark continued as a judge and a lawyer in the Cranston area until his eventual death in 1971. In his memorial it was noted that Hoyt was passionate in his beliefs so much that despite frequent warning he followed through with controversial policies that back-fired on what would have been otherwise successful campaigns.

== Mafia and illegal activity controversy ==
It was rumoured and noted in Hoyt's memorial of his attempts to uproot political and business corruption within Rhode Island. With a Law background, graduating from Harvard University, Hoyt attempted on numerous occasions to utilize the legal system to bring justice on illegal activities occurring specifically in Cranston. Despite frequent attempts to weaken Mafia connections within Rhode Island, Hoyt saw reasonable failure within the court system and after confrontation with government officials he saw himself under scrutiny for his relentless pursuit by fellow Republican members, which would eventually lead to his dismissal.

== Conversations with President Harry S. Truman ==
Through hand written diary accounts Hoyt W. Lark had accounted of conversations with Harry S. Truman on the state of corruption developing in Rhode Island. In these diaries Hoyt mentioned an apathy presented by the Federal Government and a reluctant acceptance of illegal activities, which he had found resentful. The diaries state that this was a turning point in Hoyt's career in which he saw his life in politics as 'a candle's flame at the end of its wick'. The nature of politics proved to be mentally overwhelming as he would pursue more aggressive policy actions shortly thereafter.

== Personal life ==
Hoyt Webb Lark married Helen Crooker and was the father of Dana Webb Lark (father of sons Stephen Hoyt Lark and David Joseph Lark, and daughter Susan Helen Lark), and also Bert Weston Lark,(father of Kenneth Webb Lark and Chris-Ann Lark). Hoyt was considered a family man that took frequent passionate interest and involvement in business, political, and social issues within Rhode Island. As a result, Hoyt became well known and respected within the Rhode Island community as a firm but intelligible mayor, lawyer, and judge, and was well received amongst his constituents. Hoyt died on May 1, 1971, at the age of 78.

== See also ==
- List of mayors of Cranston, Rhode Island
