= Diet of Speyer (1544) =

1544 diet of the Holy Roman Empire

The Fourth Imperial Diet of Speyer, also referred to as the Diet of 1544, was a Diet of the Holy Roman Empire, called together on February 20, 1544 by Charles V, Holy Roman Emperor. Charles called the meeting because he wanted to fight a war against France, which he acknowledged required the support of the Lutheran princes, many of them members of the Schmalkaldic League. He received their support by granting them concessions and almost completely abandoning his Catholic position, disregarding the wishes of Pope Paul III. It was decided at this meeting that no formal action should be taken against the Lutherans until a free council met.

== See also ==
- Treaty of Speyer (1544)

== Bibliography ==
- Acton, John Emerich Edward Dalberg; Ernest Alfred Benians; Sir Adolphus William Ward; George Walter Prothero (1904). The Cambridge Modern History. New York: Macmillan & Co., ltd.
- Herzog, Johann Jakob; Philip Schaff; Albert Hauck (1911). The New Schaff-Herzog Encyclopedia of Religious Knowledge. Funk and Wagnalls Company.
- Mathews, Shailer; Gerard Birney Smith (1921). A Dictionary of Religion and Ethics. Macmillan.
