= Prebendaries' Plot =

The Prebendaries' Plot was an attempt during the English Reformation by religious conservatives to oust Thomas Cranmer from office as Archbishop of Canterbury. The events took place in 1543 and saw Cranmer formally accused of being a heretic. The hope was that this would stop further religious reforms in Kent and end Protestant influence at the royal court of Henry VIII.

It is named after the five prebendary canons of Canterbury Cathedral (including William Hadleigh, a monk at Christchurch Canterbury prior to the monastery's dissolution) who formed its core. Others involved were two holders of the new cathedral office of "six preacher" (created in 1541), along with various local non-cathedral priests and Kentish gentlemen (such as Thomas Moyle, Edward Thwaites and Cyriac Pettit). Simultaneous agitation at the court in Windsor and the conspiracy in general were led covertly by Stephen Gardiner, bishop of Winchester.

Henry VIII's chaplain Richard Cox was charged with investigating and suppressing it, and his success (240 priests and 60 laypeople of both sexes were accused of involvement) led to his being made Cranmer's chancellor (and later, bishop of Ely under Elizabeth I). Gardiner survived, but his nephew German Gardiner, who had acted as his secretary and intermediary to the plotters in Kent, was executed in 1544 for questioning the Royal Supremacy.

== Sources ==
- Ethan H. Shagan, Popular Politics and the English Reformation, pp. 199–204
- Hogben, Brian M. (1984). "Preaching and Reformation in Henrician Kent". Archaeologia Cantiana. 101: 169–185.
- Eamon Duffy, The Stripping of the Altars, chapter 12
- Diarmid MacCulloch, Thomas Cranmer, chapter 8
- M. I. Zell, The Prebendaries' Plot
- Peter Clark, English Provincial Society from the Reformation to the Revolution, chapter 2
