= German Gardiner =

Roman Catholic saint (died 1544)

Blessed German Gardinaer

Martyr
- Died: 7 March 1544; Tyburn, London, England
- Honored in: Roman Catholic Church
- Beatified: 15 December 1929 by Pope Pius XI
- Feast: 7 March

German Gardiner (Germain, Jermyn) (date of birth unknown; executed at Tyburn, 7 March 1544) was a Roman Catholic layman and nephew to Stephen Gardiner who became involved in the Prebendaries' Plot against Thomas Cranmer.

Henry VIII was becoming more severe on Protestants and Cranmer fell under suspicion. Gardiner was (or was thought to have been) employed in drawing up a list of Cranmer's heresies. His condemnation was part of a deal with which Cranmer gained the king's full support: Cranmer's higher-ranked enemies were allowed to remain in place, while a charge of collusion with Cardinal Pole was brought against Gardiner.

He wrote a tract against John Frith, dated 1 August 1534. Gardiner's indictment states that he was executed for endeavouring "to deprive the King of his dignity, title, and name of Supreme Head of the English and Irish Church". Thomas Haywood, who had been condemned with him, was afterward pardoned on recanting his opinions. His other companions at the bar were John Larke, and John Ireland, a priest who had once been Thomas More's chaplain. They suffered the death of traitors at Tyburn.

German Gardinar was beatified in 1886, John Ireland in 1929.
