= John Larke =

English Catholic priest and martyr (died 1544)

Blessed John Larke

Martyr
- Born: fl. before 1500
- Died: 7 March 1544 (aged above 44); Tyburn, London, England
- Beatified: 29 December 1886 by Pope Leo XIII
- Feast: 7 March
- Attributes: chasuble, book of hours

John Larke (fl. c. 1500 – died 7 March 1544) was an English Catholic priest and martyr, who was executed during the reign of Henry VIII. Larke was a notable personal friend of Thomas More, Lord High Chancellor of England. Larke was beatified in 1886 by Pope Leo XIII.

== Life ==
Larke studied at Cambridge University, before serving for twenty six years as rector of St. Ethelburga's Bishopsgate in the City of London. He transferred to a prosperous living as rector of Woodford, Essex, before returning to London four years later, in 1530, when Sir Thomas More appointed him vicar of Chelsea.

Larke allegedly swore the Oath of Supremacy in 1534 but, as Cresacre More puts it: "the example of St. Thomas More's death so wrought on his mind that afterwards he followed his own sheep and suffered a famous martyrdom."

He was indicted on 15 February 1544, with John Ireland, vicar of Eltham, German Gardiner, and Thomas Heywood. All were condemned, but Heywood recanted on the hurdle and lived to give testimony against Cranmer. The other three, along with another priest from Lancashire, Robert Singleton, whose arrest was never explained, were executed on 7 March 1544.

== See also ==
- List of Catholic martyrs of the English Reformation
