= 1547 =

1547 in various calendars
- Gregorian calendar: 1547; MDXLVII
- Ab urbe condita: 2300
- Armenian calendar: 996; ԹՎ ՋՂԶ
- Assyrian calendar: 6297
- Balinese saka calendar: 1468–1469
- Bengali calendar: 953–954
- Berber calendar: 2497
- English Regnal year: 38 Hen. 8 – 1 Edw. 6
- Buddhist calendar: 2091
- Burmese calendar: 909
- Byzantine calendar: 7055–7056
- Chinese calendar: 丙午年 (Fire Horse); 4244 or 4037 — to — 丁未年 (Fire Goat); 4245 or 4038
- Coptic calendar: 1263–1264
- Discordian calendar: 2713
- Ethiopian calendar: 1539–1540
- Hebrew calendar: 5307–5308
- Hindu calendars
- Vikram Samvat: 1603–1604
- Shaka Samvat: 1468–1469
- Kali Yuga: 4647–4648
- Holocene calendar: 11547
- Igbo calendar: 547–548
- Iranian calendar: 925–926
- Islamic calendar: 953–954
- Japanese calendar: Tenbun 16 (天文１６年)
- Javanese calendar: 1465–1466
- Julian calendar: 1547; MDXLVII
- Korean calendar: 3880
- Minguo calendar: 365 before ROC 民前365年
- Nanakshahi calendar: 79
- Thai solar calendar: 2089–2090
- Tibetan calendar: མེ་ཕོ་རྟ་ལོ་ (male Fire-Horse); 1673 or 1292 or 520 — to — མེ་མོ་ལུག་ལོ་ (female Fire-Sheep); 1674 or 1293 or 521

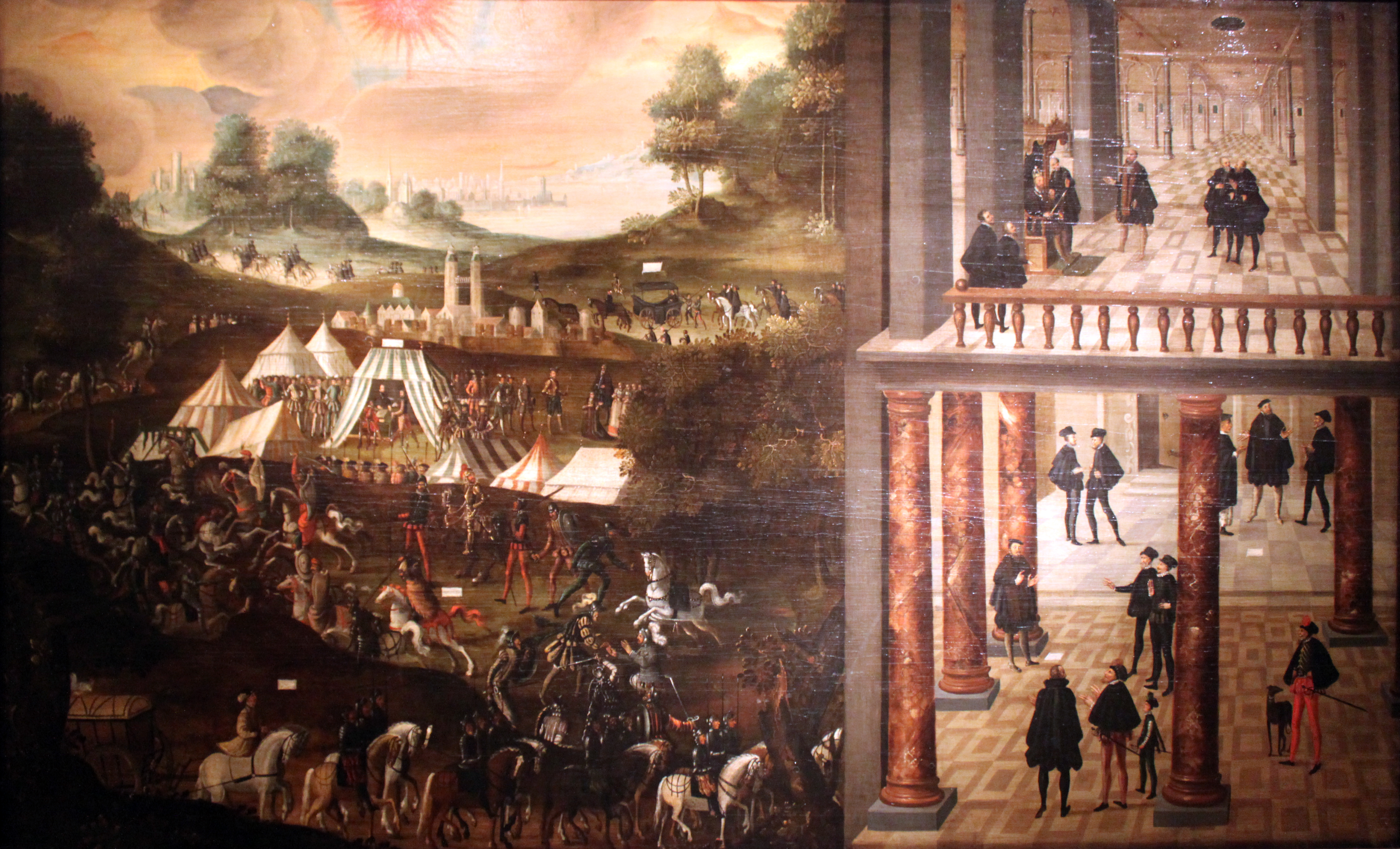
April 24:Schmalkaldic League rebels defeated by Holy Roman Empire at Battle of Mühlberg

Year 1547 (MDXLVII) was a common year starting on Saturday of the Julian calendar.

== Events ==
=== January–March ===
- January 8 – The first Lithuanian-language book, a Catechism (Katekizmo paprasti žodžiai, Simple Words of Catechism), is published in Königsberg by Martynas Mažvydas.
- January 13 – Henry Howard, Earl of Surrey is sentenced to death for treason in England.
- January 16 – Grand Prince Ivan IV is crowned as Tsar of all Russia at the Dormition Cathedral in Moscow, thereby proclaiming the Tsardom of Russia.
- January 28 – King Henry VIII of England dies in London, and is succeeded by his 9-year-old son Edward VI, as King of England.
- February 20 – Edward VI of England is crowned at Westminster Abbey.
- March 31 – King Francis I of France dies at the Château de Rambouillet and is succeeded by his eldest surviving son Henry II (on his 28th birthday) as King of France.

=== April–June ===
- April 4 – Catherine Parr, widow of King Henry VIII of England, secretly marries Thomas Seymour, 1st Baron Seymour of Sudeley.
- April 24 – Battle of Mühlberg: Emperor Charles V defeats the Lutheran forces of the Schmalkaldic League and takes John Frederick I.
- May 19 – John Frederick I signs the Capitulation of Wittenberg in order to have his life spared by the Holy Roman Empire.
- May 23 – The Protestant Schmalkaldic League defeats the Catholic Army of the Holy Roman Empire at the Battle of Drakenburg. Of 6,000 Imperial troops, 2,500 are killed and another 2,500 are taken prisoner by the Protestants.
- June 4 – Maurice, Duke of Saxony is formally raised to the status of the Elector.
- June 13 – A peace treaty is signed between representatives of the Holy Roman Empire and of the Ottoman Empire and France after the Holy Roman Empire's defeat at the 1543 Siege of Nice.
- June 21 – The apparition of Mary, mother of Jesus is seen by several women in the Sicilian city of Alcamo. She becomes the patron saint of the city and is celebrated as the Madonna of Miracles (la Madonna dei Miracoli)
- June 23 – Philip I, Landgrave of Hesse and John Frederick I, Elector of Saxony, leaders of the Schmalkaldic League who were both captured at the battle of Muhlberg, are transported to south Germany and imprisoned for their revolt against the Empire.
- June 26 – King Henri of France orders the division of France's easternmost provinces and divides them into three zones of control, each administered by a Marshal of the Army. Harding, Robert (1978). Anatomy of a Power Elite: the Provincial Governors in Early Modern France. Yale University Press. p. 29.
- June 29 – A fleet of 21 French galleys, commanded by Leone Strozzi, arrives at Fife in Scotland and begins the siege of St Andrews Castle. The siege lasts for a month before John Knox and Protestant nobles surrender on July 31.

=== July–September ===
- July 10 – In France, a duel takes place at between Guy I de Chabot, the future Baron of Jarnac, and François de Vivonne, Lord of La Châtaigneraie, in front of the Château de Saint-Germain-en-Laye. Vivonne, known for his fencing ability, is wounded and dies the next day.
- July 17 – After the Earl of Arran, Regent of Scotland for Mary, Queen of Scots, is unable to get England to voluntarily return control of Langholm to Scotland, he "reduces it by force.".
- July 25 – The coronation of Henri II as King of France at the Reims Cathedral.
- August 13 – The Duchy of Brittany unites with the Kingdom of France.
- September 10
  - Battle of Pinkie Cleugh: An English army under the Duke of Somerset, Lord Protector of England, defeats a Scottish army under James Hamilton, 2nd Earl of Arran, the Regent. The English seize Edinburgh.
  - Conspirators led by Ferrante Gonzaga murder Pier Luigi Farnese, Duke of Parma and son of the Pope, and hang his body from a window of his palace in Piacenza.

=== October–December ===
- October 13 – (New Moon of Thadinovut 909 ME) With the end of the Buddhist Lent, the Kingdom of Burma (now Myanmar) mobilizes to invade the Kingdom of Arakan (now Thailand).
- The English Parliament, the first convened since the death of King Henry VIII, is opened by King Edward VI.
- November 5 – Catherine Parr, the former Queen consort of England and widow of King Henry VIII, publishes her book The Lamentation of a Sinner.
- November 15 – A fleet of 60 Ottoman Navy ships, commanded by Piri Reis, arrives at the port of Aden (now in Yemen) and captures the city in slightly more than three months, by February 26, 1548.
- December 6 – The Battle of Perlis River is fought between the Portuguese Navy and the navy of the Aceh Sultanate (now a province of Indonesia) at the Perlis River in Malaysia. With nine light warships and 230 soldiers, the Portuguese sink or capture 45 of the 60 ships of Aceh vessel leave 4,000 of their 5,380 soldiers dead or missing.
- December 24 – King Edward VI of England gives royal assent to numerous laws enacted by Parliament, including the Treason Act and the Vagabonds Act.
- December 28 – Sir John Luttrell of England, recently victorious over Scotland in the Battle of Pinkie, raids the Scottish port of Burntisland on the Firth of Forth, after his uncle Thomas Wyndham brings two Royal Navy warships. Luttrell and Wyndhamburn ships and buildings on the pier and capture Rossend Castle

=== Date unknown ===
- Huguenots increasingly immigrate to the English county of Kent, especially Canterbury, from France.
- The Chambre Ardente is established in Paris for trying heretics.
- Work on construction of the Château de Chambord, in the Loire Valley, for Francis I of France, ceases.
- John Dee visits the Low Countries, to study navigation with Gemma Frisius.
- Edward VI of England outlaws execution by boiling.

== Births ==
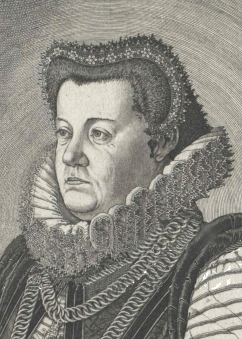
Duchess Hedwig of Württemberg

Joanna of Austria, Grand Duchess of Tuscany

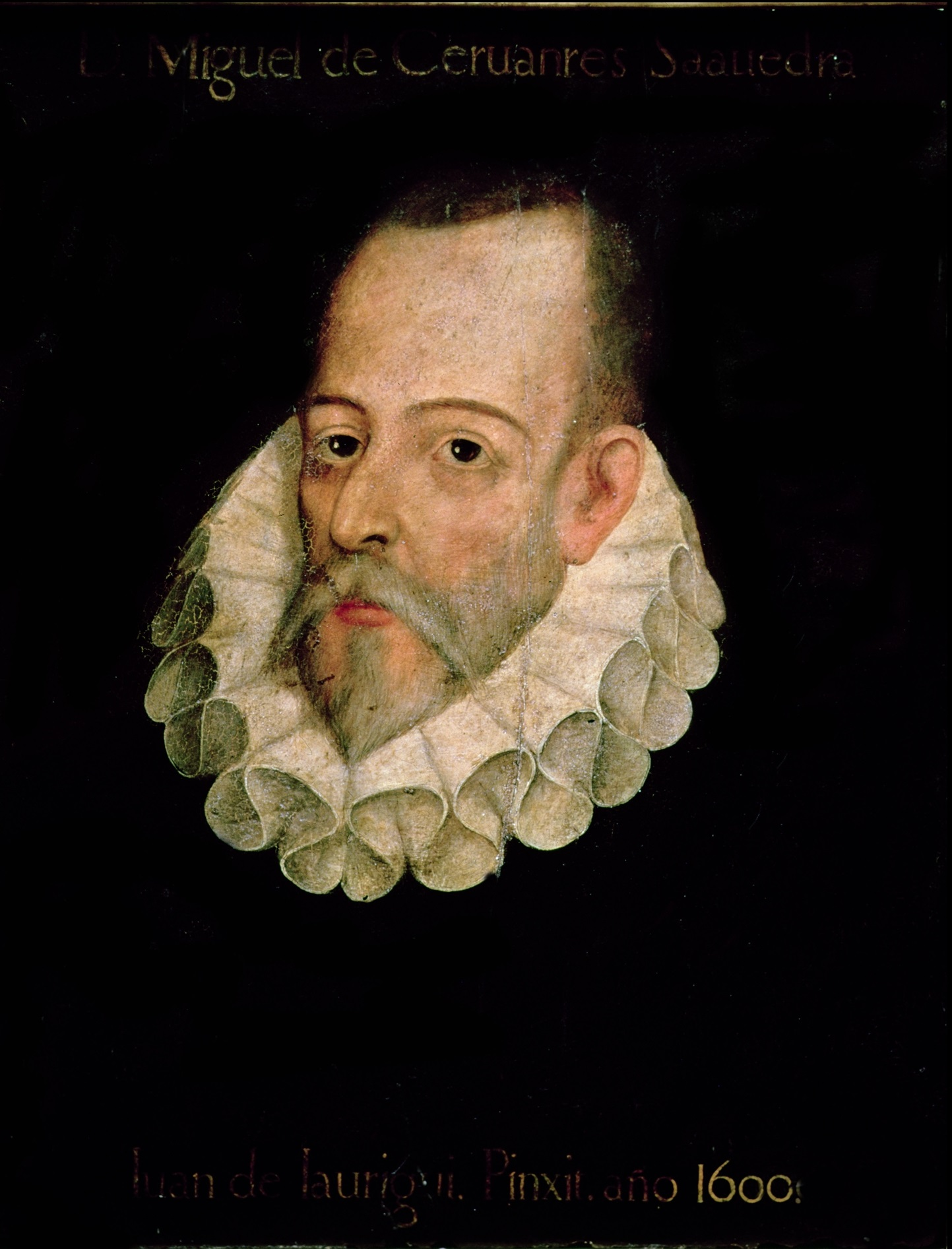
Miguel de Cervantes

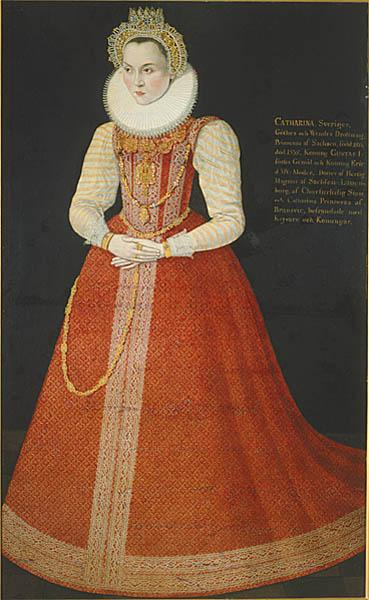
Princess Sophia of Sweden

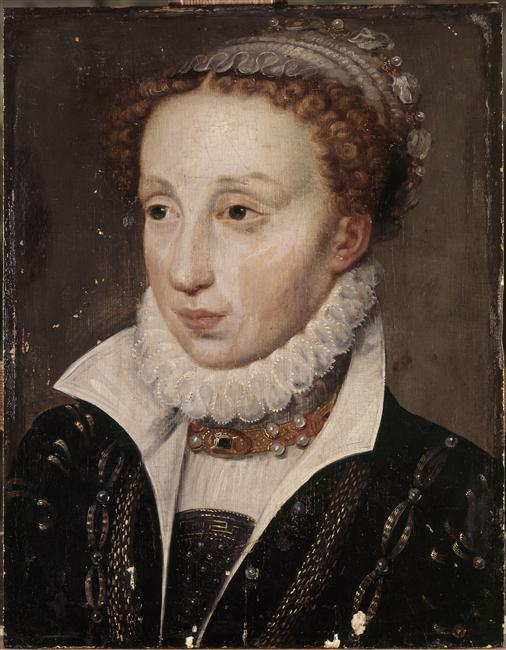
Claude of Valois

- January 15 – Duchess Hedwig of Württemberg, by marriage countess of Hesse-Marburg (d. 1590)
- January 20 – Laurence Bruce, Scottish politician (d. 1617)
- January 24 – Joanna of Austria, Grand Duchess of Tuscany, Austrian Archduchess (d. 1578)
- February 8 – Girolamo Mattei, Italian Catholic cardinal (d. 1603)
- February 18 – Bahāʾ al-dīn al-ʿĀmilī, Syrian Arab co-founder of the Isfahan School of Islamic Philosophy (d. 1621)
- February 24 – Don John of Austria, military leader (d. 1578)
- March 1 – Rudolph Goclenius, German philosopher (d. 1628)
- March 26 – Bernardino Bertolotti, Italian instrumentalist and composer (d. 1609)
- April 8 – Lucrezia Bendidio, noblewoman and singer in Renaissance Ferrara (d. 1584)
- May 15 – Magnus Pegel, German mathematician (d. 1619)
- May 19 – Gustaf Banér, Swedish nobleman and member of the Privy Council of Sweden (d. 1600)
- June 28 – Cristofano Malvezzi, Italian organist and composer (d. 1599)
- July 5 – Garzia de' Medici, Italian noble (d. 1562)
- August 10 – Francis II, Duke of Saxe-Lauenburg (d. 1619)
- September 10 – George I, Landgrave of Hesse-Darmstadt (d. 1596)
- September 14 – Johan van Oldenbarnevelt, Dutch statesman (d. 1619)
- September 20 – Faizi, Indo-Persian poet and scholar (d. 1595)
- September 22 – Philipp Nicodemus Frischlin, German philologist and poet (d. 1590)
- September 29 – Miguel de Cervantes, Spanish fiction writer (d. 1616)
- October 2 – Philipp Ludwig, Count Palatine of Neuburg (1569–1614) and Count Palatine of Sulzbach (1604–1614) (d. 1614)
- October 18 – Justus Lipsius, Flemish humanist (d. 1606)
- October 29 – Princess Sophia of Sweden, Swedish princess (d. 1611)
- November 7 – Rudolf Hospinian, Swiss writer (d. 1626)
- November 10
  - Martin Moller, German poet and mystic (d. 1606)
  - Gebhard Truchsess von Waldburg, Archbishop of Cologne (d. 1601)
- November 12 – Claude of Valois, daughter of King Henry II of France (d. 1575)
- November 26 – Nicolaus Taurellus, German philosopher and theologian (d. 1606)
- December 5 – Ubbo Emmius, Dutch historian and geographer (d. 1625)
- December 15 – Magdalena of Nassau-Dillenburg, German noblewoman (d. 1633)
- date unknown
  - Matteo Perez d'Aleccio, Italian painter (d. 1616)
  - Mateo Alemán, Spanish novelist and man of letters (d. 1609)
  - Peter Bales, English calligrapher (d. 1610)
  - Louis Carrion, Flemish humanist and classical scholar (d. 1595)
  - Oichi, Japanese noblewoman (d. 1583)
  - Krzysztof Mikołaj "the Thunderbolt" Radziwiłł, Polish nobleman (d. 1603)
  - Oda Nagamasu, Japanese nobleman (d. 1622)
  - Richard Stanihurst, English translator of Virgil (d. 1618)
  - Roemer Visscher, Dutch writer (d. 1620)
  - Stanisław Żółkiewski, Polish nobleman (d. 1620)

== Deaths ==
King Henry VIII of England

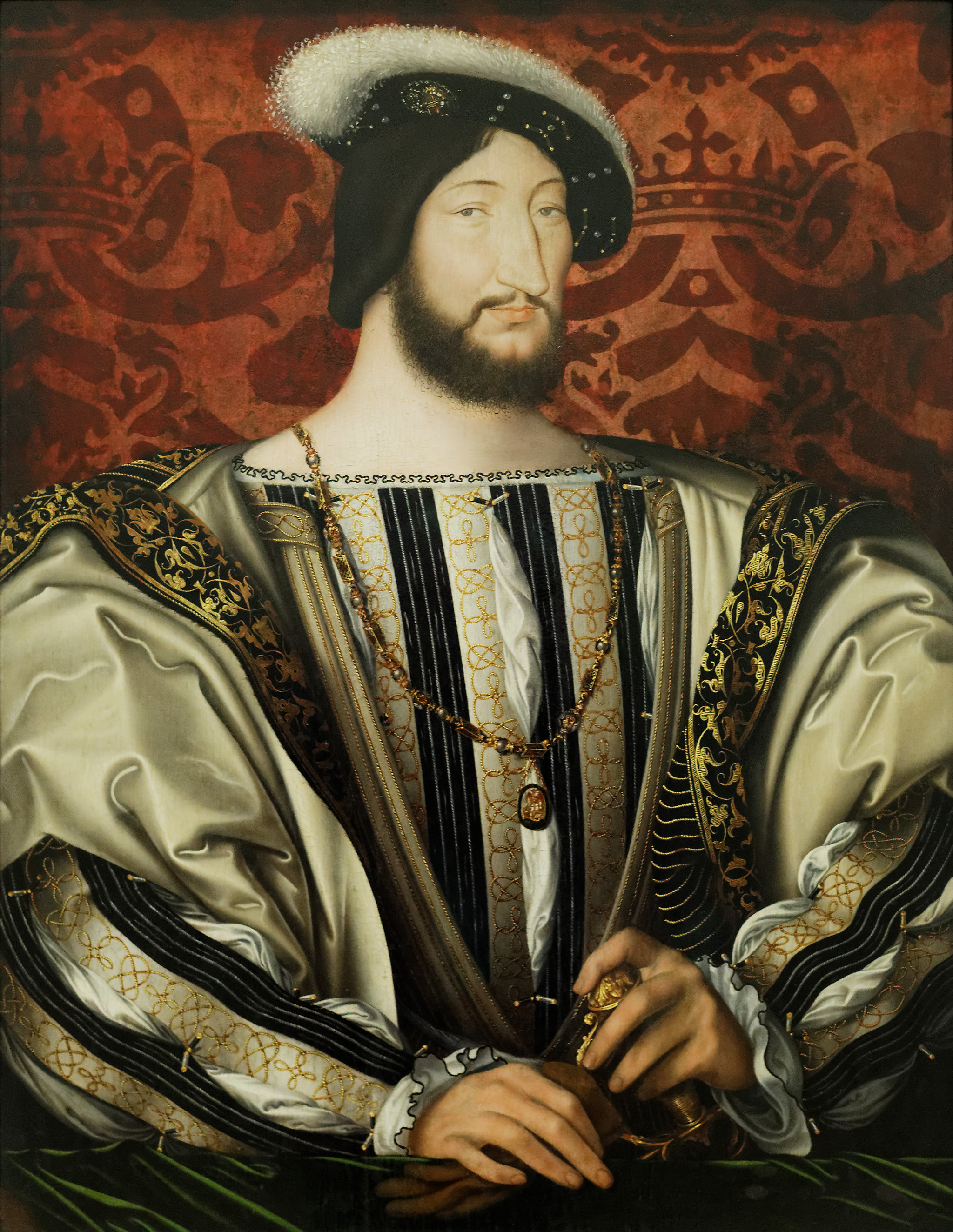
King Francis I of France

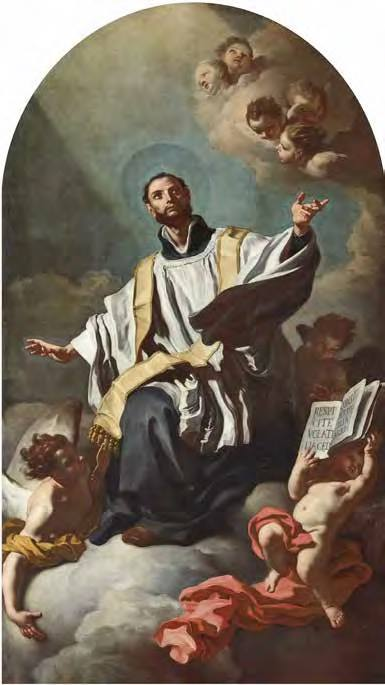
Saint Cajetan

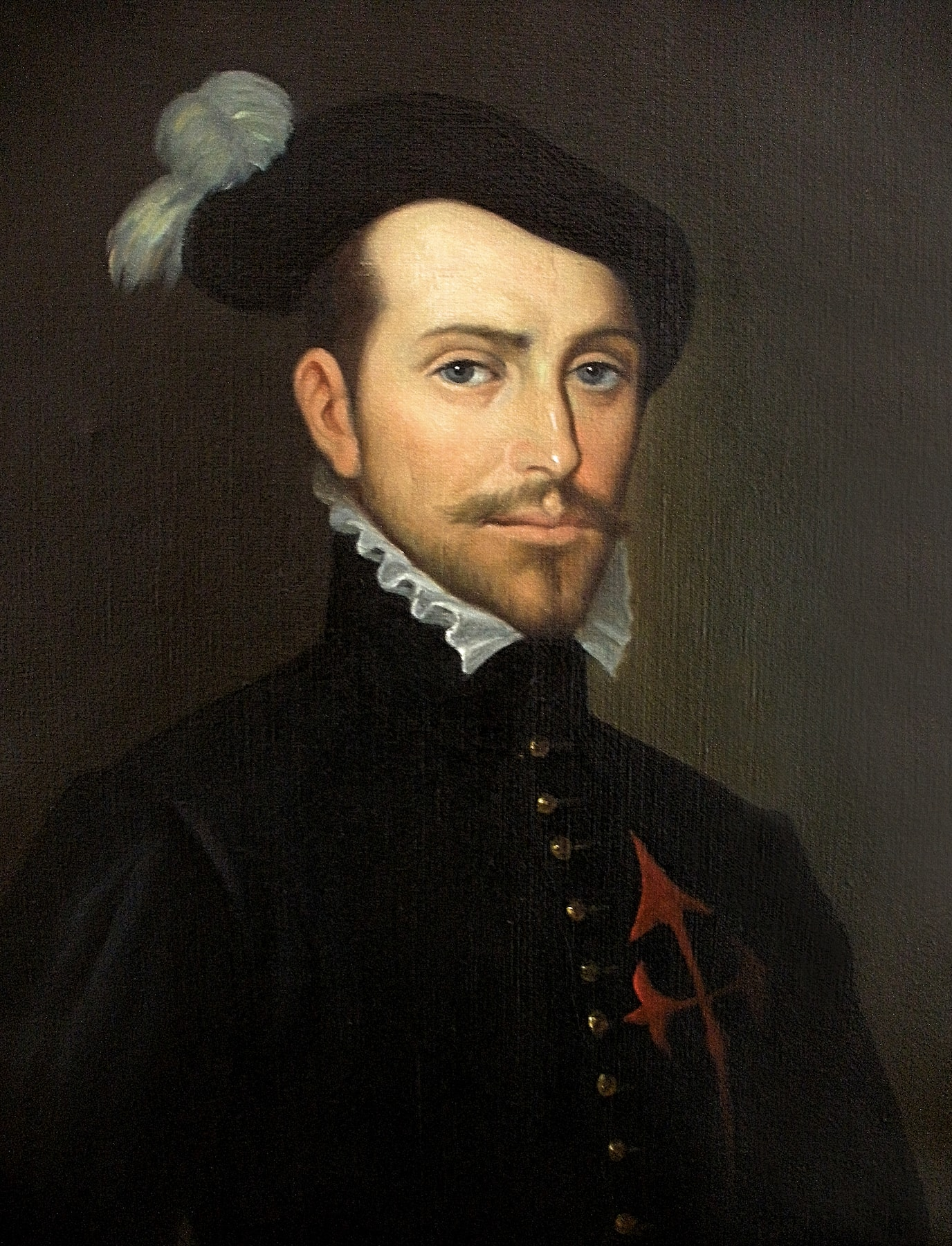
Hernán Cortés

- January 5 – Johann Heß, German theologian (b. 1490)
- January 7 –Albrecht VII, Duke of Mecklenburg (b. 1486)
- January 16 – Johannes Schöner, German astronomer and cartographer (b. 1477)
- January 18 – Pietro Bembo, Italian cardinal and scholar (b. 1470)
- January 19 – Henry Howard, Earl of Surrey, English nobleman, politician and poet, beheaded (b. c.1517)
- January 27 – Anne of Bohemia and Hungary, Queen consort of the Romans, Bohemia and Hungary (b. 1503)
- January 28 – King Henry VIII of England (b. 1491)
- February 25 – Vittoria Colonna, marchioness of Pescara (b. 1490)
- February 28 – Philippa of Guelders, Duchess of Lorraine (b. 1467)
- March 31 – King Francis I of France (b. 1494)
- April 11 – Dorothea of Denmark, Duchess of Prussia, Danish princess (b. 1504)
- May 22 – Daniel, Metropolitan of Moscow (b. c. 1492)
- c. May – Edward Hall, English chronicler and lawyer (b. c.1496)
- June 21 – Sebastiano del Piombo, Italian painter (b. 1485)
- July 20 – Beatus Rhenanus, German humanist and religious reformer (b. 1485)
- August 7 – Saint Cajetan, Italian priest and saint (b. 1480)
- August 17 – Katharina von Zimmern, Swiss sovereign abbess (b. 1478)
- September 10 – Pier Luigi Farnese, Duke of Parma (b. 1503)
- September 17 – Frederick II of Legnica, Duke of Legnica from 1488 (until 1495 and 1505 with his brothers) (b. 1480)
- October 18 – Jacopo Sadoleto, Italian Catholic cardinal (b. 1477)
- December 2 – Hernán Cortés, Spanish conquistador of Mexico (b. 1485)
- December 28 – Konrad Peutinger, German humanist and antiquarian (b. 1465)
- date unknown
  - Jörg Breu the Younger, German painter (b. 1510)
  - Meera (Mirabai), Rajput princess (b. 1498)
  - Photisarath, King of Laos (b. 1501)
