= Kulva Eldership =

Kulva Eldership Kulvos seniūnija
- Eldership
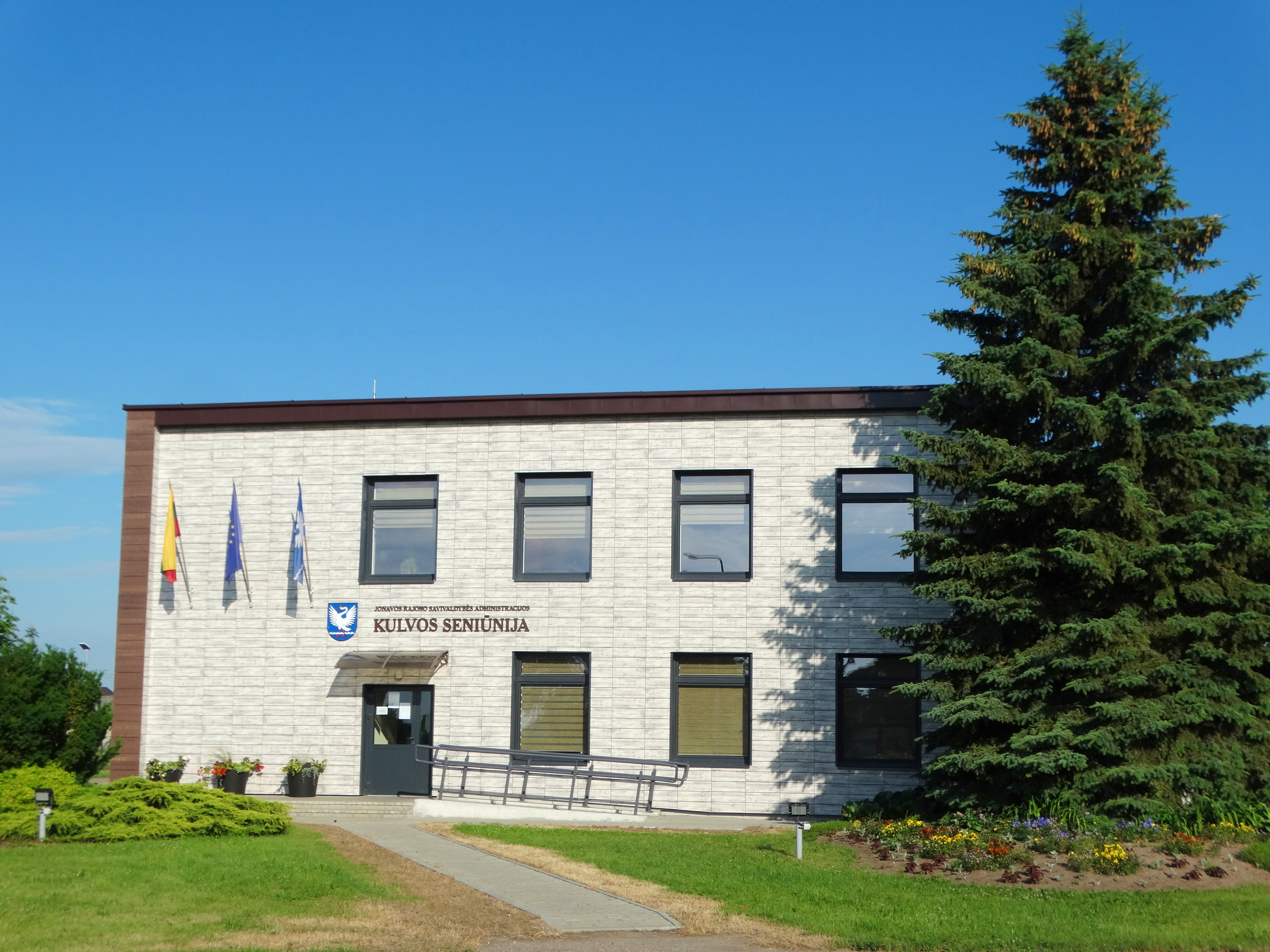
- Kulva Eldership office

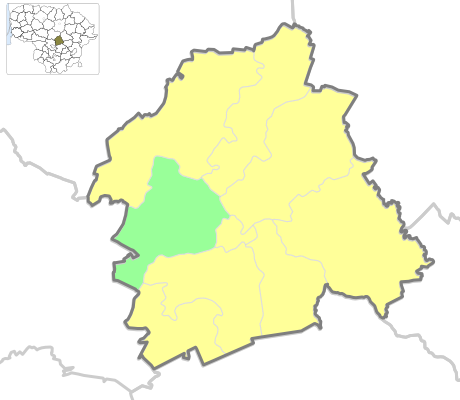
- Location of Kulva eldership
- Coordinates: 55°05′N 24°10′E
- Country: Lithuania
- Ethnographic region: Aukštaitija
- County: Kaunas County
- Municipality: Jonava District Municipality
- Administrative centre: Kulva

Area
  - Total: 112.92 km^{2} (43.60 sq mi)

Population (2021)
  - Total: 1,863
  - Density: 16.50/km^{2} (42.73/sq mi)
- Time zone: UTC+2 (EET)
  - Summer (DST): UTC+3 (EEST)

Kulva Eldership (Lithuanian: Kulvos seniūnija) is a Lithuanian eldership, located in a western part of Jonava District Municipality. As of 2020, administrative centre and largest settlement within eldership was Kulva.

== Geography ==
- Rivers: Juodmena, Neris, Šlėna, Barupė, Lankesa;
- Protected areas: Kulva Geomorphological Sanctuary;
- Eskers: Kulva esker;

== Populated places ==
Following settlements are located in the Kulva Eldership (as for 2011 census):

- Villages: Aukštigaliai, Batėgala, Bešiai, Čičinai, Čiūdai, Daigučiai, Dijokiškiai, Gineikiai, Gureliai, Jonkučiai, Kulva, Kurmagala, Laikiškiai, Mardošiškiai, Marvilius, Mažieji Žinėnai, Melnytėlė, Mykoliškiai, Naujasodis, Pabartoniai, Pakapė, Paupė, Preišiogalėlė, Ragožiai, Rimkai, Ručiūnai, Sangailiškiai, Skrebinai, Smičkiai, Šabūniškiai, Šmatai, Trakai, Vanagiškiai, Varnutė, Vešeikiai, Virbalai, Žinėnai

== Demography ==
Historical population

Year	Pop.	±% p.a.
2001	2,417	—
2011	2,118	−1.31%

Year	Pop.	±% p.a.
2021	1,863	−1.27%

Source: 1902, 1923, 1959 & 1970, 1979, 1989, 2001, 20112021

== Elections ==
=== 2023 municipality elections ===
Political party	Municipality elections	
Political party	Votes	%
Social Democratic Party of Lithuania	418	56.41%
Lithuanian Farmers and Greens Union	85	11.47%
Political committee Our Jonava	67	9.04%
Liberals' Movement	41	5.53%
Union of Democrats "For Lithuania"	33	4.45%
Homeland Union	31	4.18%
Lithuanian Regions Party	30	4.05%
Labour Party	20	2.70%
Freedom Party (Lithuania)	16	2.16%
Total registered voters: 1,772		Turnout: 41.81%
