= Jurgis Zablockis =

Lithuanian author

- Born: c. 1510; Grand Duchy of Lithuania
- Died: 1563; Tübingen, Duchy of Württemberg
- Education: Jagiellonian University; University of Wittenberg; University of Königsberg
- Occupation: Tutor

Jurgis Zablockis (Latin: Georgius Sablocius; died in 1563) was one of the first known writers in the Lithuanian language. Two hymns that he translated from German to Lithuanian were published by Martynas Mažvydas. One of them was published in Simple Words of Catechism, the first printed book in the Lithuanian language. He earned a living tutoring sons of the nobility and frequently accompanied them to Protestant universities in Germany. He was a tutor to Martynas Mažvydas and Bishop Merkelis Giedraitis.

== Biography ==
=== Origin and education ===
Very little is known about Zablockis. Zablockis signed his works as Zablotius, Zablocius, Zablocki. His last name was derived from his birthplace Zabłoć. It literally means "from beyond a bog/swamp/marsh" and is likely a Polonized version of a Lithuanian toponym such as Užbalis, Užpelkis, or similar. There are many such localities in the former Grand Duchy of Lithuania. Vaclovas Biržiška guessed that Zablockis could have been a neighbor of Abraomas Kulvietis and thus could be from the area of Kulva. Other works provide Zabalać in present-day Belarus near the Belarus–Lithuania border.

The first recorded information about Zablockis comes from 3 August 1528 when he enrolled into the Jagiellonian University in Kraków. Based on this, his birth year is estimated to be around 1510. Abraomas Kulvietis enrolled about a month prior. Zablockis enrolled with a group of students from Lithuania which also included Stanislovas Rapalionis.

=== Tutor ===
Zablockis disappeared from written records until 23 November 1540 when he enrolled into the Protestant University of Wittenberg. A day later, two Lithuanian students also enrolled into the university. Therefore, it is likely that Zablockis was their mentor and tutor.

In 1541 or 1542, Zablockis returned to Lithuania and briefly taught at a school established by Kulvietis in Vilnius. When Queen Bona Sforza who supported and protected the Protestants left for Poland, Kulvietis and Zablockis moved to Königsberg to avoid the persecution by Bishop Paweł Holszański. In August 1542, Duke Albert of Prussia wrote two recommendation letters for Zablockis to the Elder of Samogitia and to Grand Duke Sigismund I the Old. With these letters, Zablockis returned to Kraków where he likely taught nobility's children and earned a master's degree. He went back to Königsberg at the end of 1544 and persuaded Kulvietis to return to Lithuania. After obtaining a letter of recommendation from Duke Albert to Mikołaj "the Black" Radziwiłł, they returned to Lithuania, but Kulvietis became mortally ill. Zablockis cared for him until his death on 6 June 1545 in Kulva. Zablockis then returned to Königsberg where he enrolled into the University of Königsberg together with three Lithuanian students – Martynas Mažvydas, Baltramiejus Vilentas, and Aleksandras Rodūnonis.

Zablockis reappears in written records in March–August 1560 when he helped eight Lithuanians, including future bishop Merkelis Giedraitis, Piotr Wiesiołowski and his brother, and relatives of Grand Chancellor Ostafi Wołłowicz, to enroll into the University of Tübingen. The group was initiated by Pier Paolo Vergerio who visited Vilnius twice and Mikołaj "the Black" Radziwiłł. Zablockis lived in Tübingen for about three years. In May 1563, Zablockis and his students attended the wedding of Duchess Hedwig of Württemberg and Louis IV, Landgrave of Hesse-Marburg. After the wedding, Zablockis traveled to Switzerland to meet other Protestant activists including John Calvin. It appears that Zablockis returned to Tübingen and died shortly after as his students were recalled by their parents in late 1563 without Zablockis.

== Works ==
Three published works of Zablockis are known – two translated Lithuanian hymns and a Latin epitaph.

In 1547, Martynas Mažvydas published Simple Words of Catechism, the first printed book in the Lithuanian language, which included a hymn translated into Lithuanian by Zablockis. The book did not identify the author or the translator of the hymn, but the same hymn – this time attributed to Zablockis – was republished in a hymnal prepared by Mažvydas or Baltramiejus Vilentas and published in 1570. Titled Litanija naujai suguldyta (Litany Newly Translated), it has 21 six-line stanzas. The 1570 edition removed the last stanza as it wished health to the duchess, i.e. the deceased wife of Albert, Duke of Prussia (he was married twice and his wives died in 1547 and 1568). The hymn was translated from German; it is known from two hymnals published in Marburg in 1549 and two other hymnals published in Königsberg in 1549.

The 1570 hymnal included the second hymn translated by Zablockis, Giesmė apie Kristaus iš numirusių prisikėlimą (Hymn About the Resurrection of Christ from the Dead).

A six-line Latin epitaph was published by Merkelis Giedraitis in 1561 to commemorate the death of Katarzyna, mother of Piotr Wiesiołowski who was Zablockis' student in Tübingen.
