= Kulvietis =

- Lithuanian surname
- m.: Kulvietis
- f.: (unmarried): Kulvietytė
- f.: (married): Kulvietienė

Kulvietis is a Lithuanian surname, literally meaning someone from Kulva.

- Abraomas Kulvietis (1509–1545), Lithuanian jurist and professor
- Saulius Kulvietis (born 1991), Lithuanian basketball player
