= Pegel =

Pegel is a surname. Notable people with the surname include:

- Christian Pegel (born 1974), German politician
- Jane Pegel (1933–2026), American sailor
- Magnus Pegel (1547-1619), German doctor and mathematician
