= Stanislovas Rapolionis =

Lithuanian linguist and theologian

Stanislovas Svetkus Rapolionis (Latin: Stanislaus Rapagel(l)anus, Stanislaus Lituanus, Polish: Stanisław Rafajłowicz; c. 1485 or 1500 – 13 May 1545) was a Lutheran activist and Protestant reformer from the Grand Duchy of Lithuania. With patronage of Albert, Duke of Prussia, he obtained the doctorate of theology from the Protestant University of Wittenberg where he studied under Martin Luther and Philip Melanchthon. After graduation, he became the first professor of theology at the newly established University of Königsberg, also known as Albertina. As professor he began working on several Protestant publications and translations, including a Bible translation into Polish. It is believed that he also started the first translation of the Bible into Lithuanian. Together with Abraomas Kulvietis, Rapolionis was one of the first authors to write in the Lithuanian language. While Rapolionis and Kulvietis died early leaving their work unfinished, they laid the foundations for future Lithuanian writers and translators.

== Early life and studies in Kraków ==
Very little is known about Rapolionis' life prior to his studies at the University of Wittenberg in 1542 and most of his early biography is a conjecture. He hailed from a petty Lithuanian noble family from the area of Eišiškės that possibly used the Działosza coat of arms (image similar to Działosza was added next to his name in a registry at the University of Königsberg). His date of birth is unknown. In 1726, Michael Lilienthal wrote that Rapolionis died at age 60 which would put his date of birth around 1485. However, newer publications usually list his date of birth as c. 1500.

All early biographers of Rapolionis stated that he was a Franciscan friar in Vilnius before his conversion to Lutheranism possibly around 1525. He was an educated man and earned a living as a private tutor to the nobility. It is believed that Rapolionis gained support from Jonas Stanislovas Bilevičius, a Samogitian nobleman, and prepared a group of students for studies at the University of Kraków, the only university in the region at that time. He and his five students enrolled into the university on 3 August 1528. It is likely that Abraomas Kulvietis who matriculated on 6 July also belonged to the group. Rapolionis entered his name as Stanislovas, son of Jurgis of Raseiniai, Diocese of Samogitia (Stanislaus Georgy de Rozeny dioecesis Smodiensis) possibly to obscure his identity as he, a former monk, was joining a Catholic university. He graduated with a baccalaureate in 1532 or 1533.

There is no information available on Rapolionis' activities from 1532 to 1542. Possibly he was a tutor to the nobility or taught at a higher school established by Abraomas Kulvietis in Vilnius. Grand Duke Sigismund I the Old did not support the Reformation and in May 1542 issued an edict on heresy aimed at Kulvietis and other Protestants who could now be tried by the bishop. Many Protestant activists left the Grand Duchy and settled in the Lutheran Duchy of Prussia.

== Studies in Wittenberg ==
Rapolionis received financial support from Duke Albert of Prussia and enrolled into the University of Wittenberg on 22 March 1542. A surviving advertisement from that time shows that Rapolionis offered private lessons in the Hebrew language. He received a doctorate in theology after publicly defending his 28 theses on 23 May 1544. The defense was chaired by Martin Luther (only 13 defenses were chaired by Luther himself during the last decade of his life) and likely Philip Melanchthon acted as a doctoral advisor. Rapolionis thesis Die poenitentia (On Repentance) about good deeds and their impact on the judgement was inspired by the Diet of Regensburg (1541). The defense protocol was written by Johann Stoltz and spread in Lutheran centers (a copy is preserved by the Academic Library of the University of Latvia). On 29 May Rapolionis was awarded insignia of a doctor of theology (cap, ring, and Bible) and Caspar Creuziger delivered a speech De dono interpretationis in ecclesia which emphasized the importance of correctly explaining the word of God to lay people. The ceremony was concluded with a public procession through the city and a large feast.

== Last year in Königsberg ==
Rapolionis departed to Königsberg where he participated in the foundation of the Collegium Albertinum, later University of Königsberg. He became the first head of the Faculty of Theology at the new university. His annual salary was 200 guldens which was the highest salary offered and reflected the importance of his position. He taught theology, Hebrew language, and psalms. While short and with a hump, Rapolionis became known for his rhetoric abilities and his lectures became popular and were attended by prominent members of the Prussian establishment, including Duke Albert.

Rapolionis was professionally active for less than a year. He wrote and published 42 Latin thesis De ecclesia et eius notis on some of the fundamental features of Lutheranism. Using Biblical arguments, he explained why the Reformed church was opposed to the cult of saints, celibacy of priests, evangelical counsels, the Sacrament of Penance, absolution from mortal sins, and other issues. The original edition, published by Hans Weinreich, has not survived but the text was republished by Hieronymus Mencel in 1558 and 1562.

Rapolinis was also active in translation work. He evaluated the catechism translated by Jan Seklucjan into Polish and approved it for use in the Bishopric of Pomesania despite some criticism and resistance from the clergy. He worked on a translation of the Bible into Polish. Surviving letters show that Rapolionis corresponded with Bernard Wojewodka, a printer in Kraków, about setting up a shop in Königsberg for the purpose of printing the Polish Bible. Rapolinis translated at least one hymn into Lithuanian. It seems that he translated it from the original Latin Patris sapientia, veritas divina instead of using Polish or German translations. It has ten stanzas eight lines each. The hymn was published as Giesme ape kenteghima Jhesaus Christaus amszinoija Diewa sunaus in 1570 in the hymnal of Martynas Mažvydas and it is the only undisputed surviving text by Rapolionis in the Lithuanian language. Researchers believe that Rapolionis started translating the Bible into Lithuanian, though there is no direct evidence.

In November 1544, Rapolionis married Catherine, daughter of Basilius Axt, the personal physician of the Duke of Prussia. The cost of the wedding was paid by the Duke. In May 1545, Rapolionis suddenly suffered an attack of apoplexy and paralysis. He died a few days later on 13 May. Duke Albert blamed disagreements and intrigues at the university for his sudden death. Duke Albert personally attended the large funeral ceremony and ordered his body entombed in Königsberg Cathedral; the funeral sermon was delivered by Johann Briesmann; his eulogy was written by Bernardus Holtorpius. His 8-line epitaph started with "Here lies a great man, the pride of the Lithuanian nation". The tomb has not survived.
