= Šmatai =

- Village
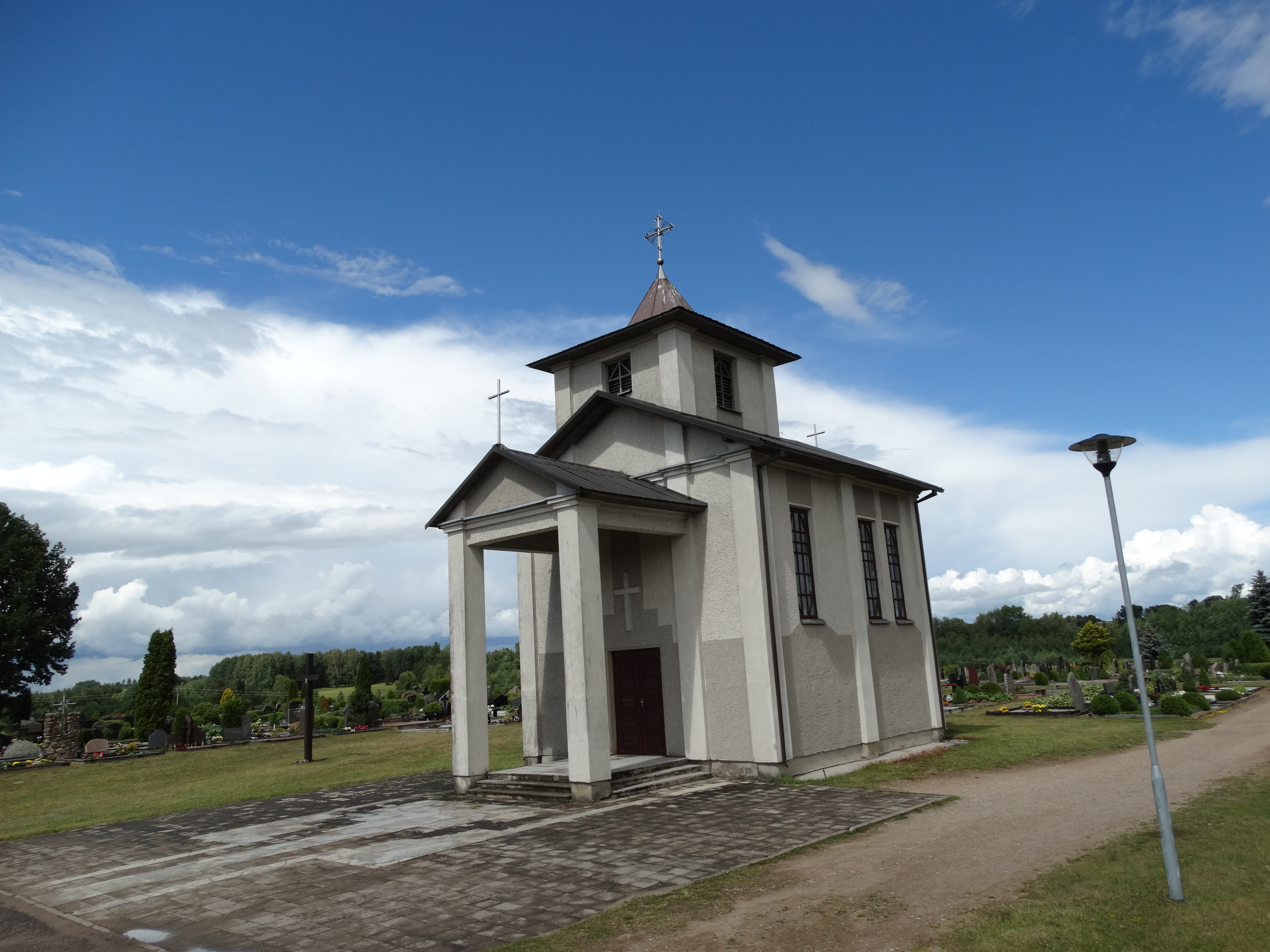

- Location of Šmatai in Lithuania
- Coordinates: 55°6′11″N 24°15′50″E
- Country: Lithuania
- County: Kaunas County
- Municipality: Jonava district municipality
- Eldership: Kulva Eldership

Population (2011)
  - Total: 10
- Time zone: UTC+2 (EET)
  - Summer (DST): UTC+3 (EEST)

Šmatai is a village in Jonava district municipality, Kaunas County, central Lithuania. According to the 2011 census, the village has a population of 10 people.

== Climate ==
The Köppen Climate Classification subtype for this climate is "Dfb" (Warm Summer Continental Climate).
