= Ručiūnai =

Village in Lithuania

- Village
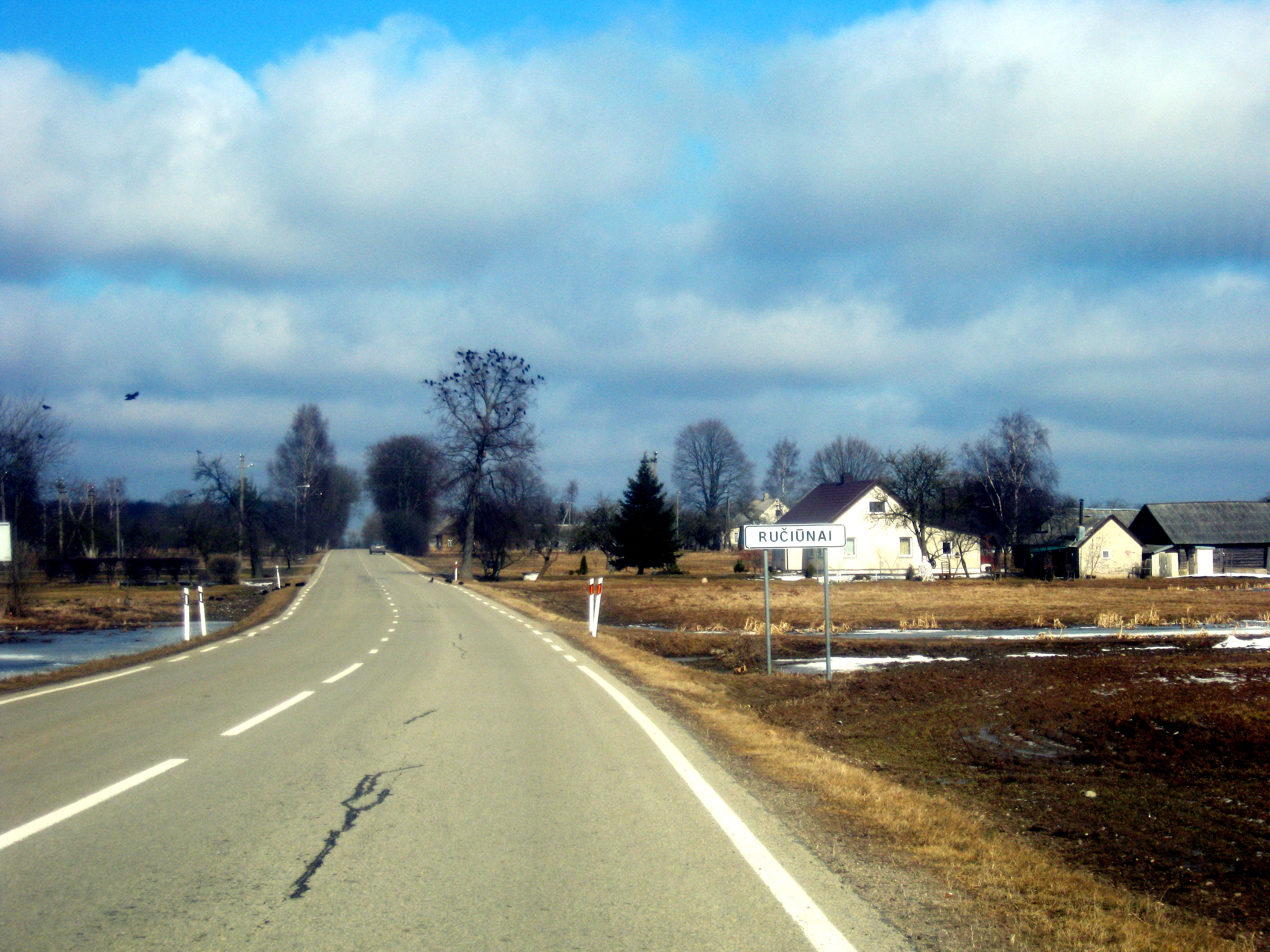

- Location in Lithuania
- Coordinates: 55°07′50″N 24°11′50″E
- Country: Lithuania
- County: Kaunas County
- Municipality: Jonava district municipality
- Eldership: Kulva Eldership

Population (2001)
  - Total: 256
- Time zone: UTC+2 (EET)
  - Summer (DST): UTC+3 (EEST)

Ručiūnai is a village in Jonava district municipality, in Kaunas County, central Lithuania. According to the 2001 census, the town has a population of 256 people.
