= Ragožiai =

- Village
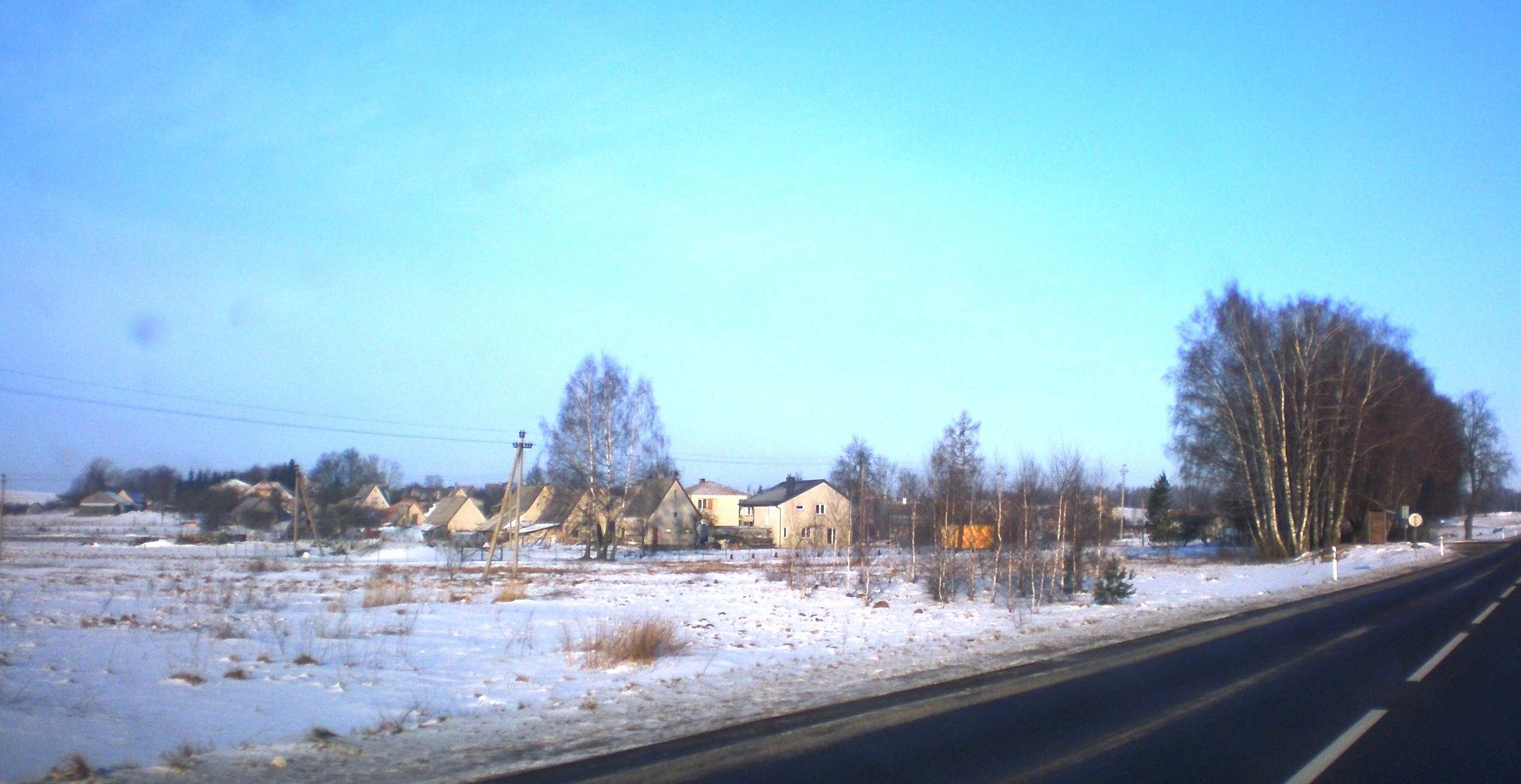

- Location in Lithuania
- Coordinates: 55°06′20″N 24°14′50″E
- Country: Lithuania
- County: Kaunas County
- Municipality: Jonava district municipality
- Eldership: Kulva eldership

Population (2011)
  - Total: 302
- Time zone: UTC+2 (EET)
  - Summer (DST): UTC+3 (EEST)

Ragožiai is a village in Jonava district municipality, in Kaunas County, central Lithuania. According to the 2011 census, the town has a population of 302 people.
