= Čičinai =

- Village
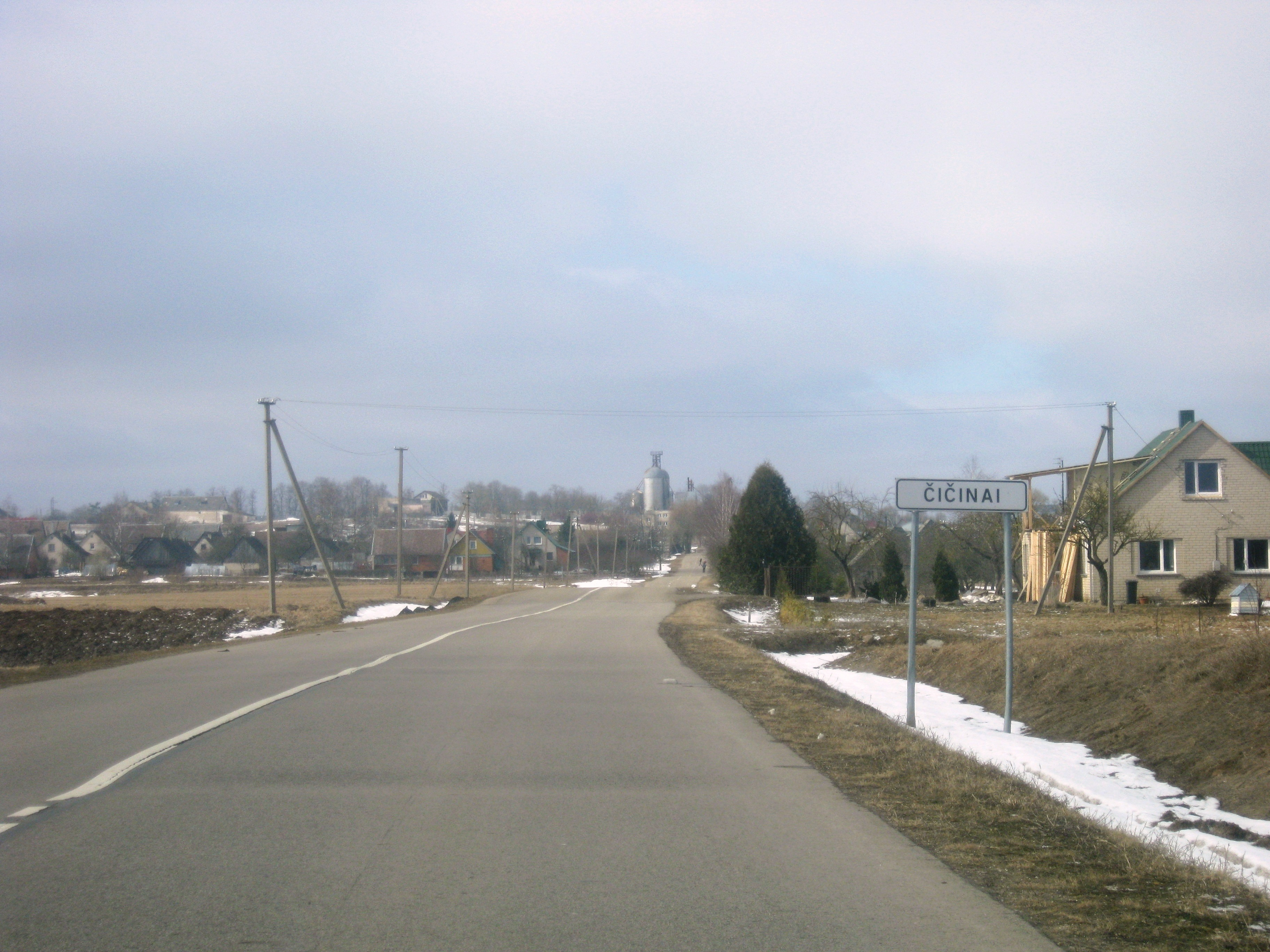

- Location in Lithuania
- Coordinates: 55°04′30″N 24°10′50″E
- Country: Lithuania
- County: Kaunas County
- Municipality: Jonava district municipality
- Eldership: Kulva eldership

Population (2011)
  - Total: 319
- Time zone: UTC+2 (EET)
  - Summer (DST): UTC+3 (EEST)

Čičinai is a village in Jonava district municipality, in Kaunas County, central Lithuania. According to the 2011 census, the town has a population of 319 people. Village is near to Neris river.

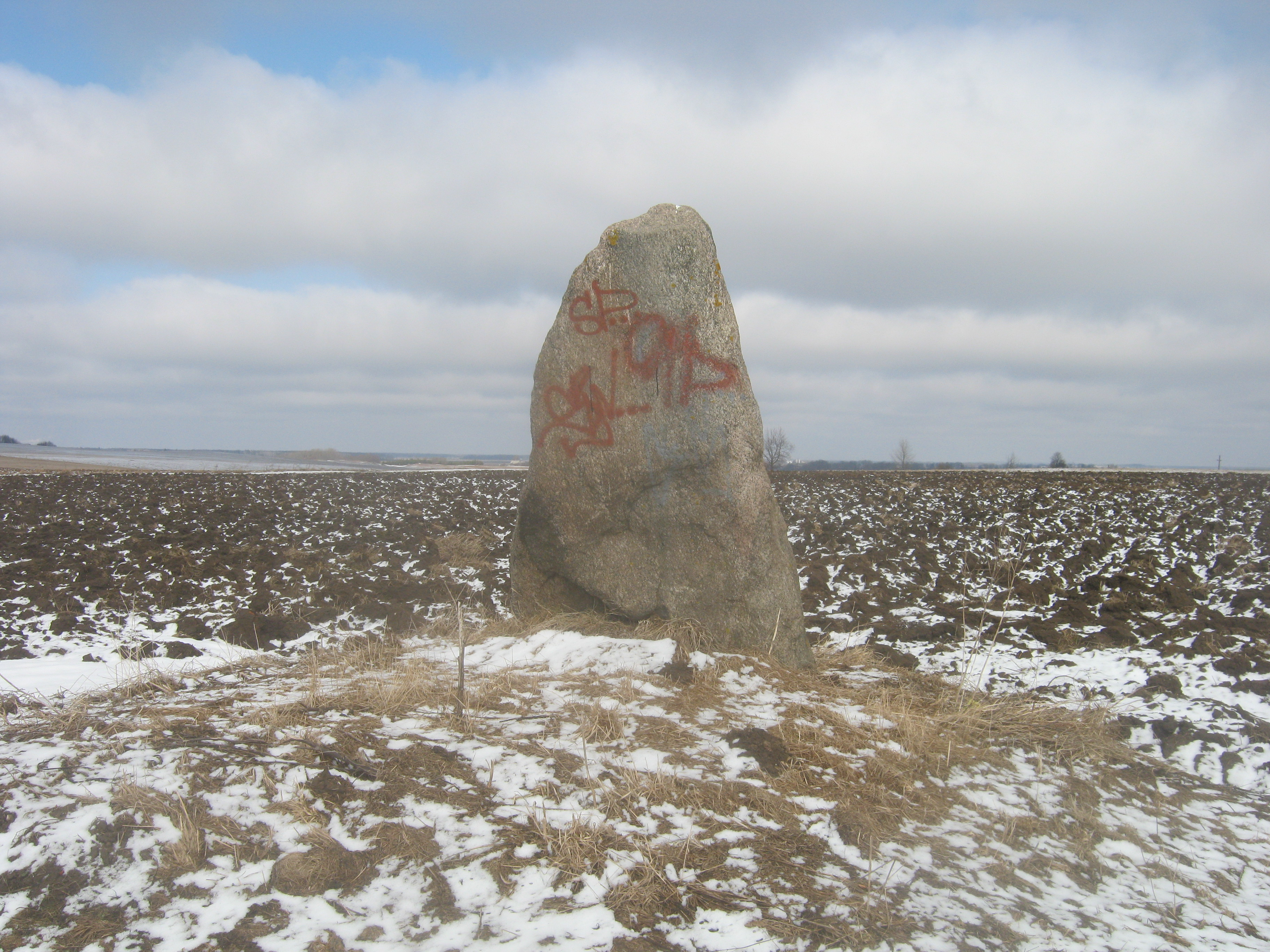
