= Battle of Perlis River =

Naval battle between Aceh and Portugal (1547)

- Part of Acehnese–Portuguese conflicts
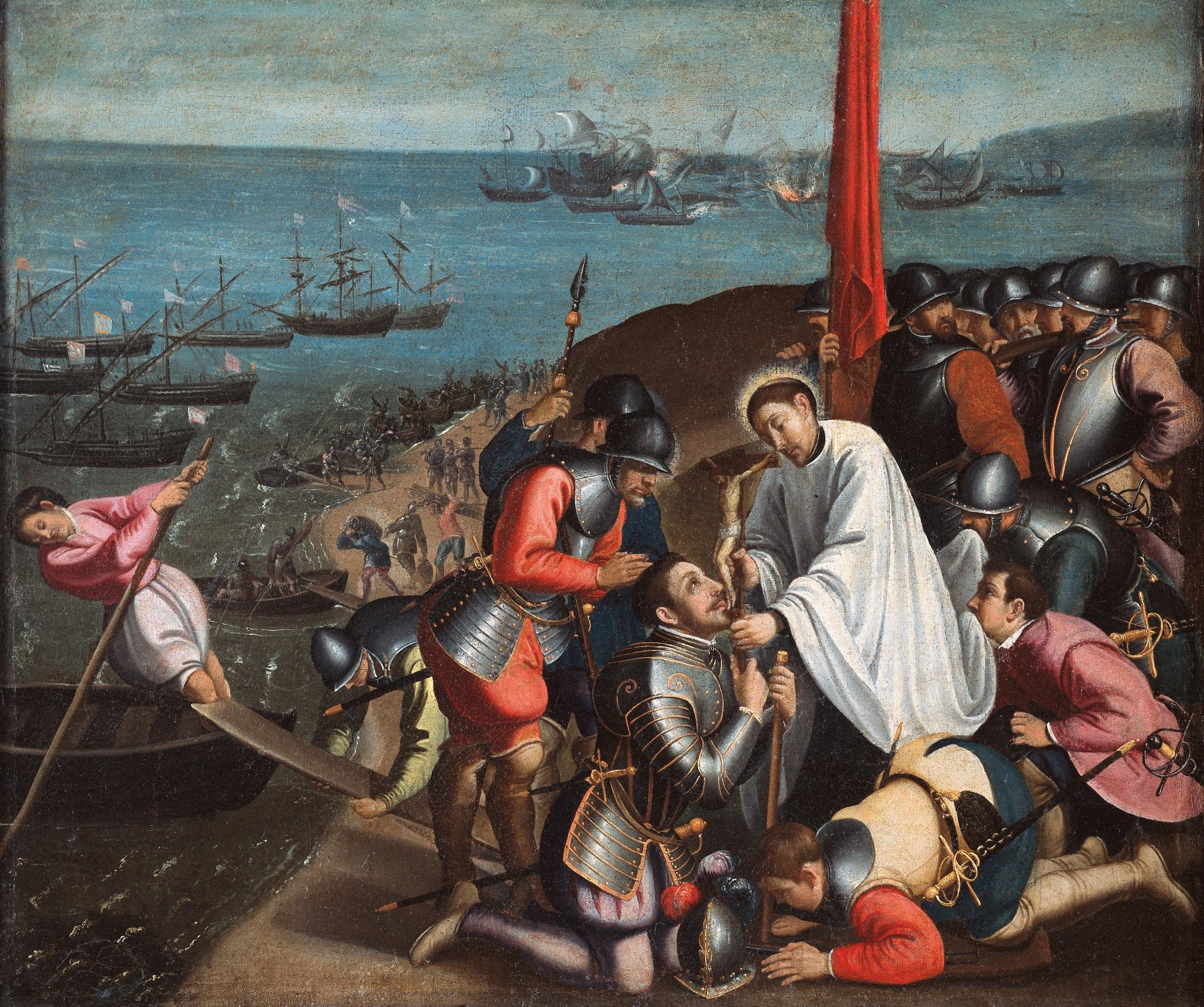
- Francis Xavier at Malacca inspiring Portuguese soldiers to fight the Acehnese. 1619 painting by André Reinoso.
Date	6 December 1547
Location	Perlis River
Result	Portuguese victory

Belligerents
Portuguese Empire	Aceh Sultanate

Commanders and leaders
Dom Francisco de Eça	Bayaya Soora

Strength
9 light galleys 230 Portuguese soldiers	5,380 men 60 vessels

Casualties and losses
29 dead 147 wounded	4,000 men killed, captured, dead or missing 45 vessels captured, 10 sunk

The Battle of Perlis River was an armed engagement that took place in 1547 in the Perlis River between a Portuguese fleet and a fleet of the Sultanate of Aceh. The Portuguese achieved "a complete victory" over the Acehnese fleet, which was almost completely destroyed.

== Context ==
At 2 am on 9 September 1547, an Acehnese fleet silently approached Portuguese Malacca in an attempt to assault it by surprise. It numbered 3 galleys, 57 lancharas, 5,000 men (including both sailors and warriors, 300 hulubalangs, plus 80 mercenaries from the Ottoman Empire of which 20 were former Janissaries of Greek origin. Command was entrusted to the former Sultan of Pedir, Bayaya Soora. The Sultan of Aceh was hoping to conquer territory across the Malacca Strait, on the Malay Peninsula.

=== Acehnese attack on Malacca ===
Under cloudy or rainy and windy conditions, Bayaya Soora began landing his men, but they were unexpectedly counter-ambushed by the Portuguese, who were aware of their approach, and received them with matchlock fire, killing many. After quickly reembarking his men, Bayaya Soora sent the Portuguese captain of Malacca Simão de Melo a message, delivered by some fishermen he had captured and mutilated, written in their blood: he challenged Melo to a single-duel, threatening among other things to "consider the King of Portugal as the lowliest vassal of Aceh" if he did not comply.

I, Bayaya Soora, who have the honor of carrying, enclosed in vessels of pure gold, the smile of the great sultan Alaradin, the sweetly perfumed candlestick of the holy house of Mecca, King of Acheen and of the lands of both seas, would have thee to know, that so thou mayst inform thy king, that I have taken up my position on this his seas, throwing fear and terror into your fortress with my fierce roaring; and here I wil remain as long as such may be my pleasure: and of this my purpose, I call upon the earth, and all nations comprising it, together with all the elements, the heavens with their moon, to bear me witness: all of which proclaim, by my mouth, that thy king is conquered, vanquished - a man of no repute, no valor - his troops defeated and destroyed by land; nor will he ever more be able to unfurl his standard, unless by the permission of him who gains the victory now. Let him then bow his head beneath the feet of my king, for from this day forth he will become his subject and my slave. And that thou thyself mayst confess the truth of this, I at this moment, and from the place where I now am, send thee this challenge and defiance. Let it be seen whether for his sake thou wilt dare to accept and answer it.

The message was received with amusement by the Portuguese command, but was ignored, and the Acehnese withdrew north.

=== Portuguese preparations ===
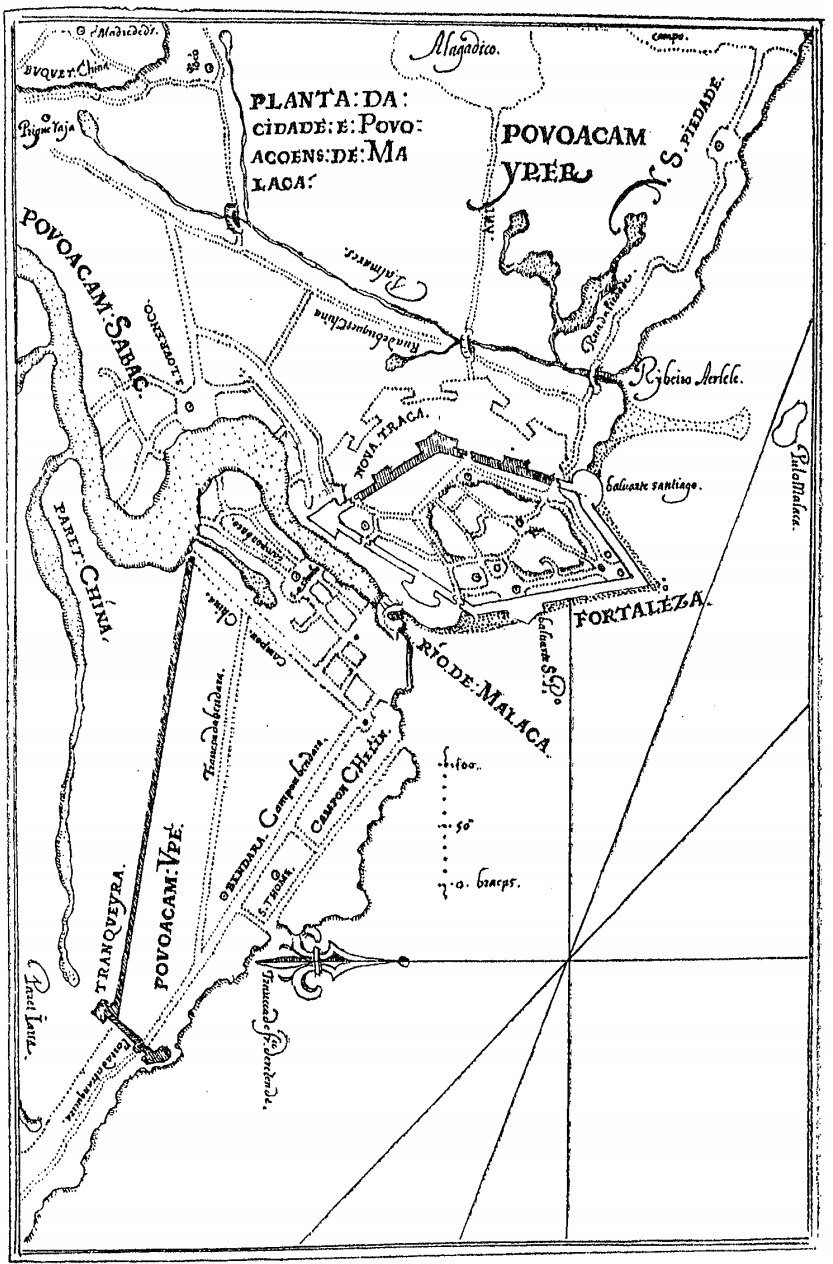
Plan of Portuguese Malacca.

At that time, the Jesuit missionary Francis Xavier resided in the city, who publicly criticised the garrison for not chasing the enemy. Nine light-galleys and 230 soldiers were then equipped to seek battle with the Acehnese, the supplies having been provided voluntarily by the people of Malacca. On 25 October 25 Portuguese flottilla set sail, numbering 9 light galleys and 230 soldiers, besides an unrecorded number of rowers, sailors, Indian auxiliaries and slaves, under the command of Dom Francisco de Eça.

=== The ruse of the Sultan of Johor ===
Sometime after the departure of Dom Francisco, a large fleet of over 300 vessels under the command of the Sultan of Johor anchored in the Muar River near Malacca. Having been informed that a Portuguese fleet had recently left to fight the Acehnese, the sultan offered captain Simão de Melo his condolences for "the total destruction" of the Portuguese fleet, and requested permission to both drop anchor in the harbour and also to land forces to help protect the city from the Acehnese. Suspecting treachery, Melo rejected the offer, claiming that "a great victory" had just been won and that he had enough soldiers to defend Malacca. The sultan did not move from the Muar and dispatched light vessels north to gather information.

== Battle ==
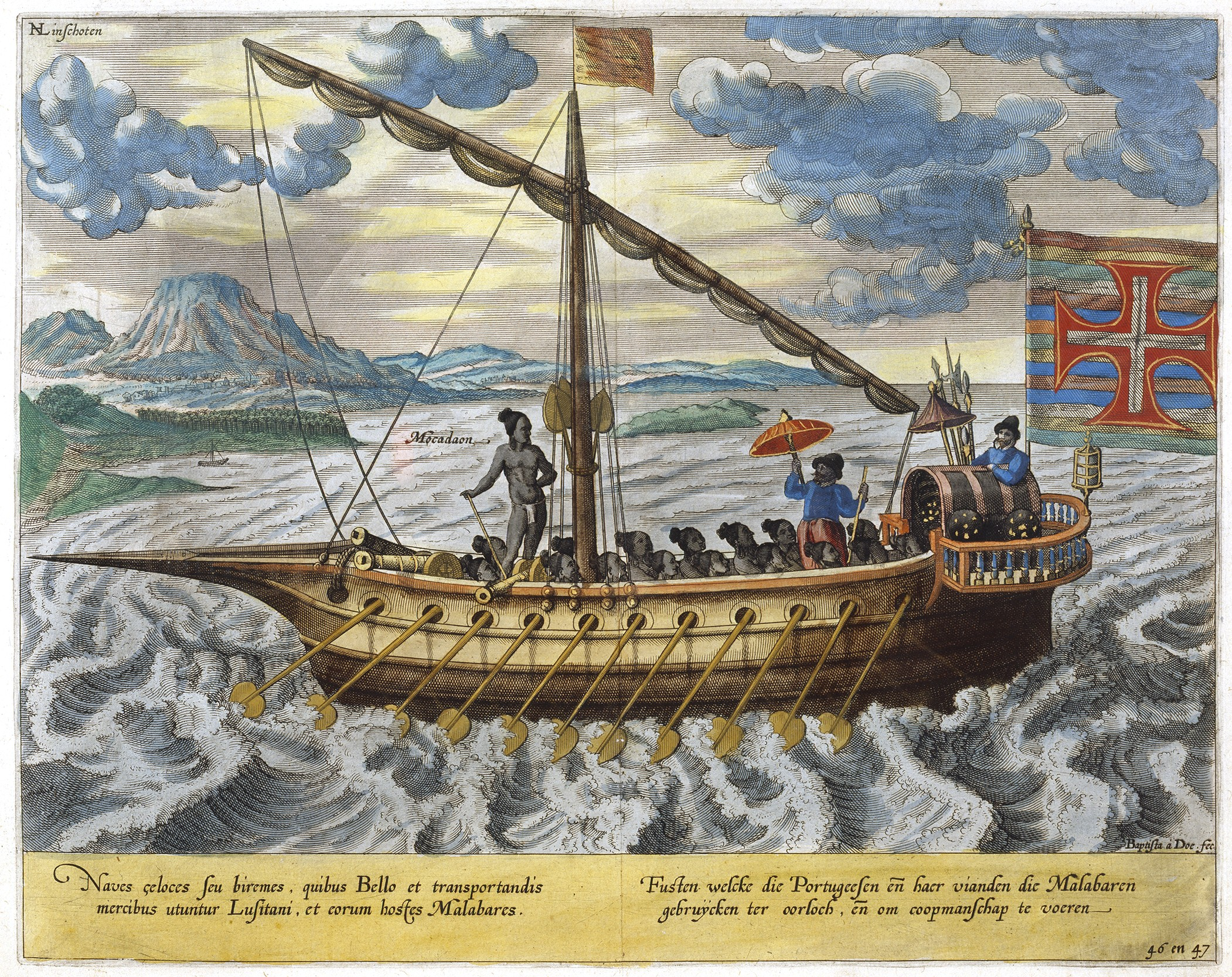
Portuguese light oarvessel.

Dom Francisco was instructed not to sail north of Pulo Sambilão island. Upon reaching those islands a storm prevented him from turning back, and after gathering a war-council with his captains they set sail to Tenasserim.

The flottilla entered the Perlis River to take in water, but learned from local fishermen that by pure chance the Acehnese happened to be anchored upstream; they had already captured Perlis, sacked the surrounding towns, killed or enslaved thousands and were building a fort.

Once the Portuguese learned that the Acehnese were approaching, Dom Francisco ran through his fleet fortifying his men with spirited words. The Aceh fleet sailed resolutely and in formation, but it lacked heavy caliber artillery, and as the river was narrow, they could not take advantage of their numerical superiority.

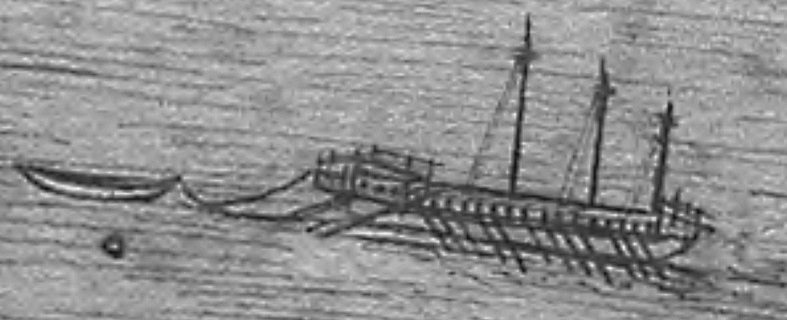
Three masted Acehnese galley-like vessel, depicted by the Portuguese in 1568.

Acehnese gunners fired too early, and their shots fell short. Once they were very close, the Portuguese fired a salvo of heavy guns, which severely damaged the three Turkish galleys in the vanguard, while the Acehnese flagship was sunk, which threw the following oarships into disarray. The Portuguese unleashed volleys of artillery and matchlock fire or clay bombs into the compact Acehnese fleet before boarding the ships closest, and after an hour all Acehnese had jumped overboard, beached their ships or been killed in action.

== Aftermath ==
The Portuguese captured 45 vessels, of which 20 were burned, and 300 cannon, 800 arquebuses and a large but unrecorded number of personal weapons, many richly decorated with jewels. The Portuguese lost 29 men, while thousands of Acehnese were killed. The Sultan of Perlis, who had lost his capital to the Acehnese retreated to Patani, regrouped and counterattacked with 500 men, killed 200 Acehnese in the action, and recovered his sultanate. He later met Dom Francisco to sign an alliance with the Portuguese and became a tributary vassal of Portugal.

Dom Francisco and his force was met with triumphant celebrations in Malacca. After learning that the Acehnese had been defeated, the Sultan of Johor assaulted the messenger who delivered the news in a fit of rage, and withdrew from the Muar.

== See also ==
- Portuguese Malacca
- Portuguese conquest of Malacca
- Siege of Malacca (1568)
