= Gureliai =

- Village
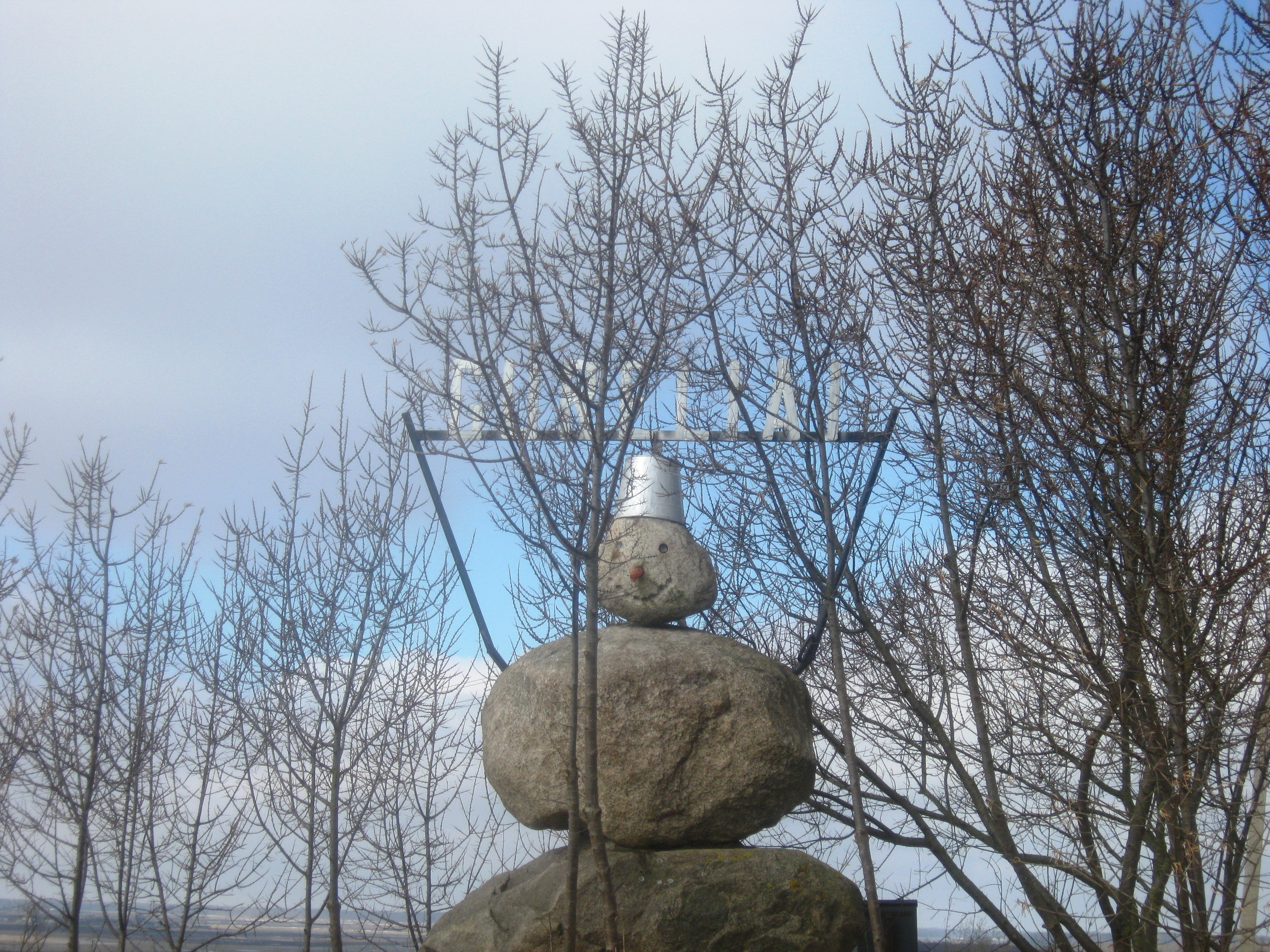

- Location of Gureliai in Lithuania
- Coordinates: 55°04′58″N 24°08′57″E
- Country: Lithuania
- County: Kaunas County
- Municipality: Jonava district municipality
- Eldership: Kulva eldership

Population (2011)
  - Total: 3
- Time zone: UTC+2 (EET)
  - Summer (DST): UTC+3 (EEST)

Gureliai is a village in Jonava district municipality, Kaunas County, central Lithuania. According to the 2011 census, the village has a population of 3 people.

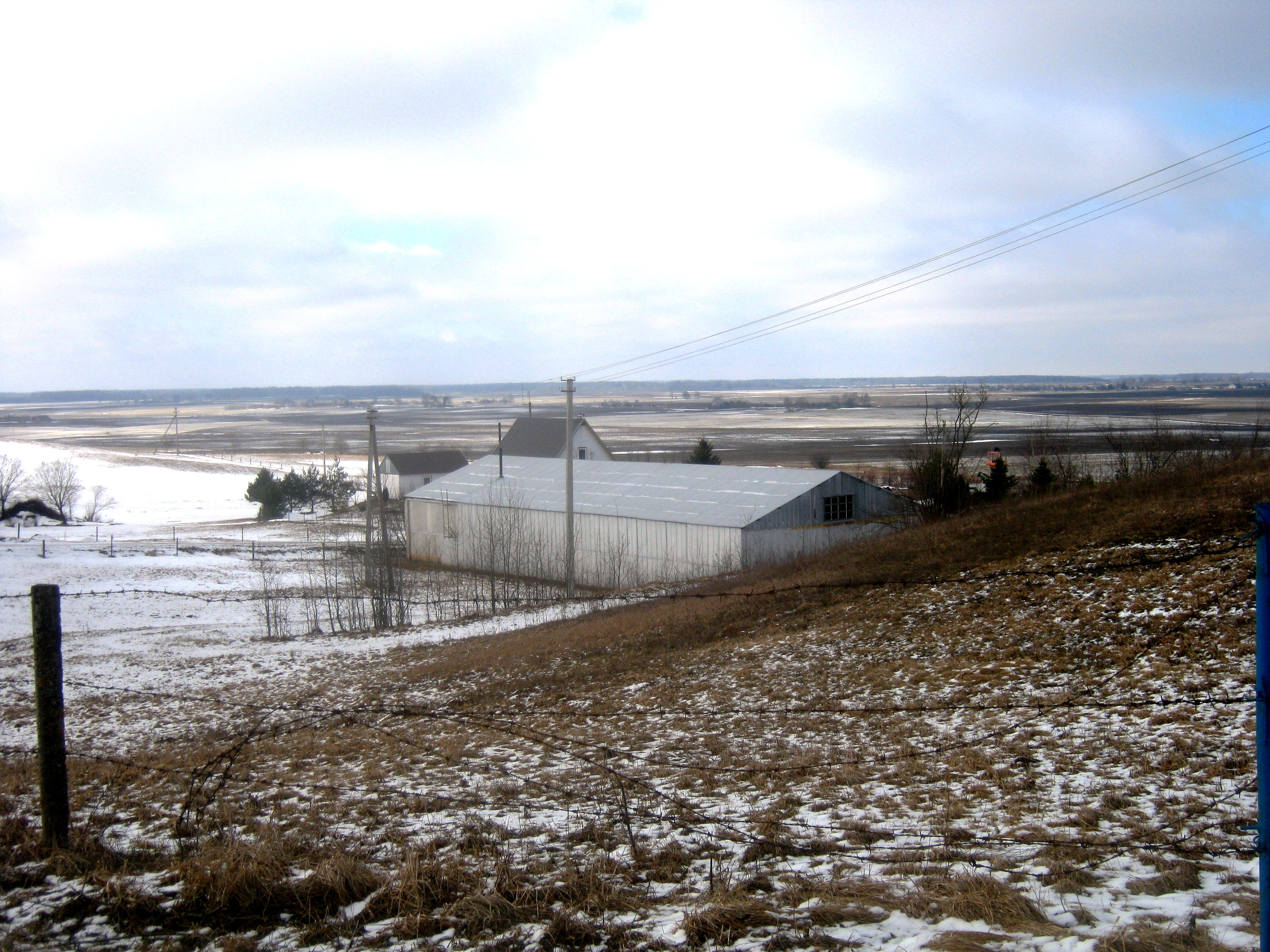

== Climate ==
The Köppen Climate Classification subtype for this climate is "Dfb" (Warm Summer Continental Climate).
