= Perlis River =

River in Perlis, Malaysia

Coordinates: 6°24′N 100°08′E

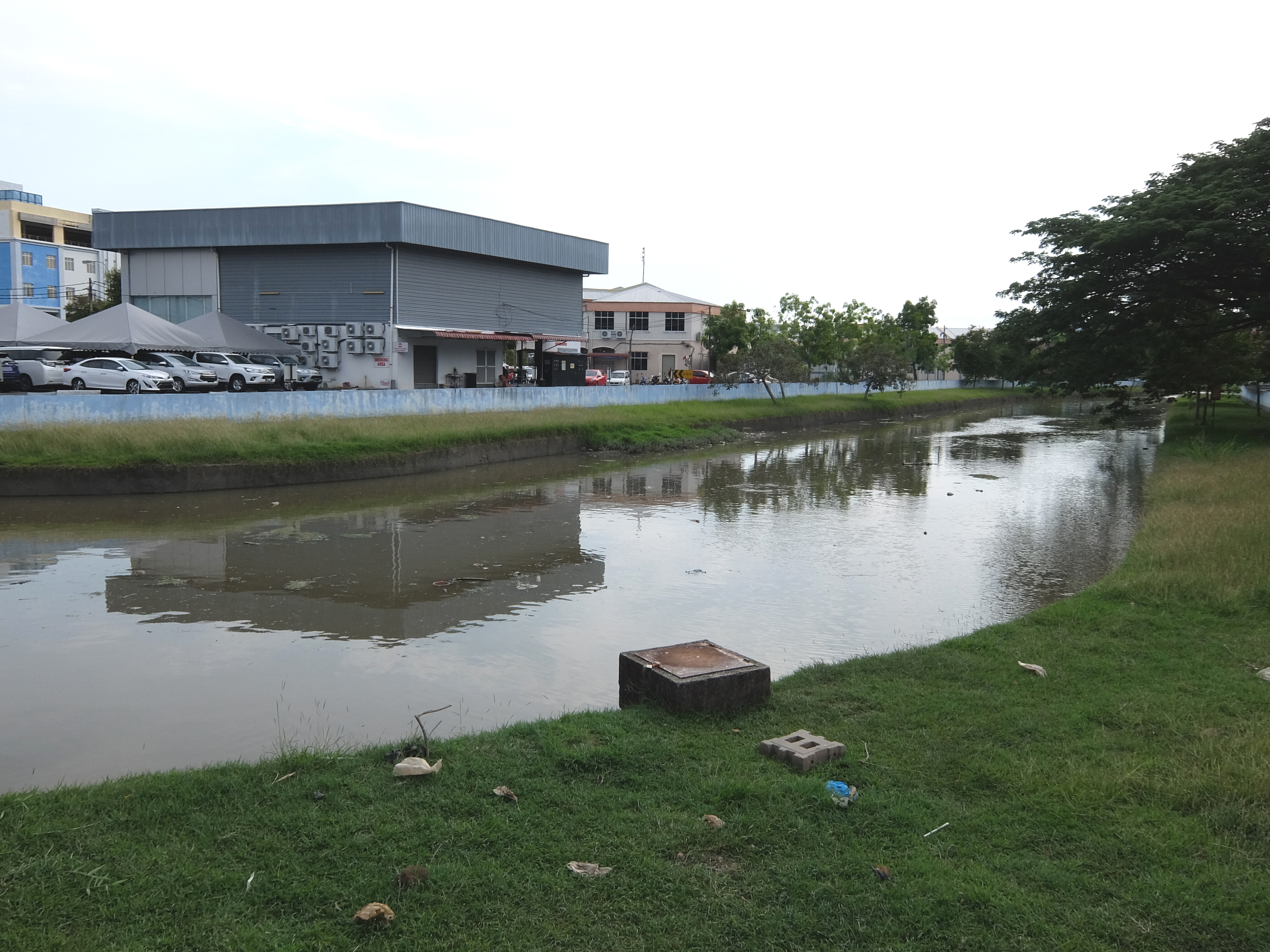
- Native name: Sungai Perlis (Malay)

Location
- Country: Malaysia
- State: Perlis

Physical characteristics
- Length: 11.8 km (7.3 mi)
- Basin size: 310 km^{2} (120 sq mi)

The Perlis River (Malay: Sungai Perlis) is a river in Perlis, Malaysia.

== Geography ==
The river's 11.8 km length makes it the fourth-longest river in the Perlis state.

== History ==
The river was the site of the Battle of Perlis River between the Portuguese and Aceh. Under the 11th Malaysia Plan, 11 km of the river will be developed and beautified, on the section from Kuala Perlis to Kangar.

== See also ==
- Geography of Malaysia
