= Bernardino Bertolotti =

Italian composer and instrumentalist

Bernardino Bertolotti (March 26, 1547 – after 1609) was an Italian composer and instrumentalist. He came from a family of instrumentalists and instrument makers, and was the son of Agostino Bertolotti, who was the maestro di cappella at Salò cathedral. Bernardino joined the Este court at Ferrara in 1578, and left when the court dissolved in 1598, at which point he went to the court of Vincenzo Gonzaga at Mantua, a closely related court, and in 1609 was instrumentalist to the pope at the Castel Sant'Angelo. It seems that he played the violin and trombone as part of his duties.

Bertolotti was a minor composer, and despite the revolutionary musical changes which were occurring in Ferrara during his tenure there, most notably in the work of Luzzasco Luzzaschi, his works remained pedestrian and were published: Missarum ad quinque voces, Bernardini Bertolotti Salodien. Serenissimi Ferrariae Ducis Musici. Liber primus. Nunc primum in lucem editus. - Venetijs. Apud Riciardum Amadinum 1593 - in 4°. He was the cousin of Gasparo da Salò.
