= Martynas Mažvydas =

Lithuanian writer (1510–1563)

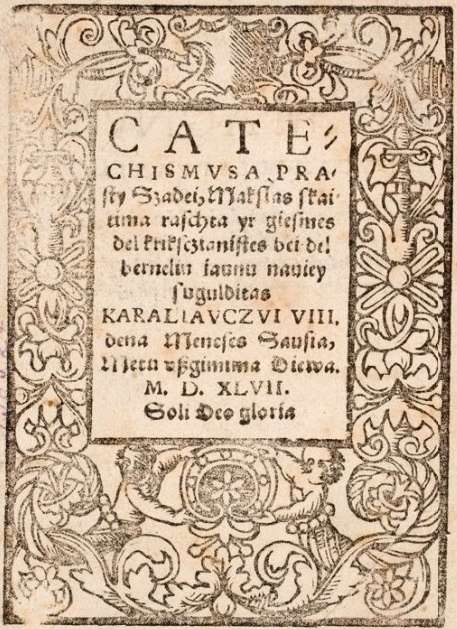
The First Lithuanian printed book The Simple Words of Catechism (1547)

Martynas Mažvydas (1510 – 21 May 1563) was a Protestant author who edited the first printed book in the Lithuanian language.

Variants of his name include Martinus Masvidius, Martinus Maszwidas, M. Mossuids Waytkūnas, Mastwidas, Mažvydas, Mosvidius, Maswidsche, and Mossvid Vaitkuna.

== Biography ==
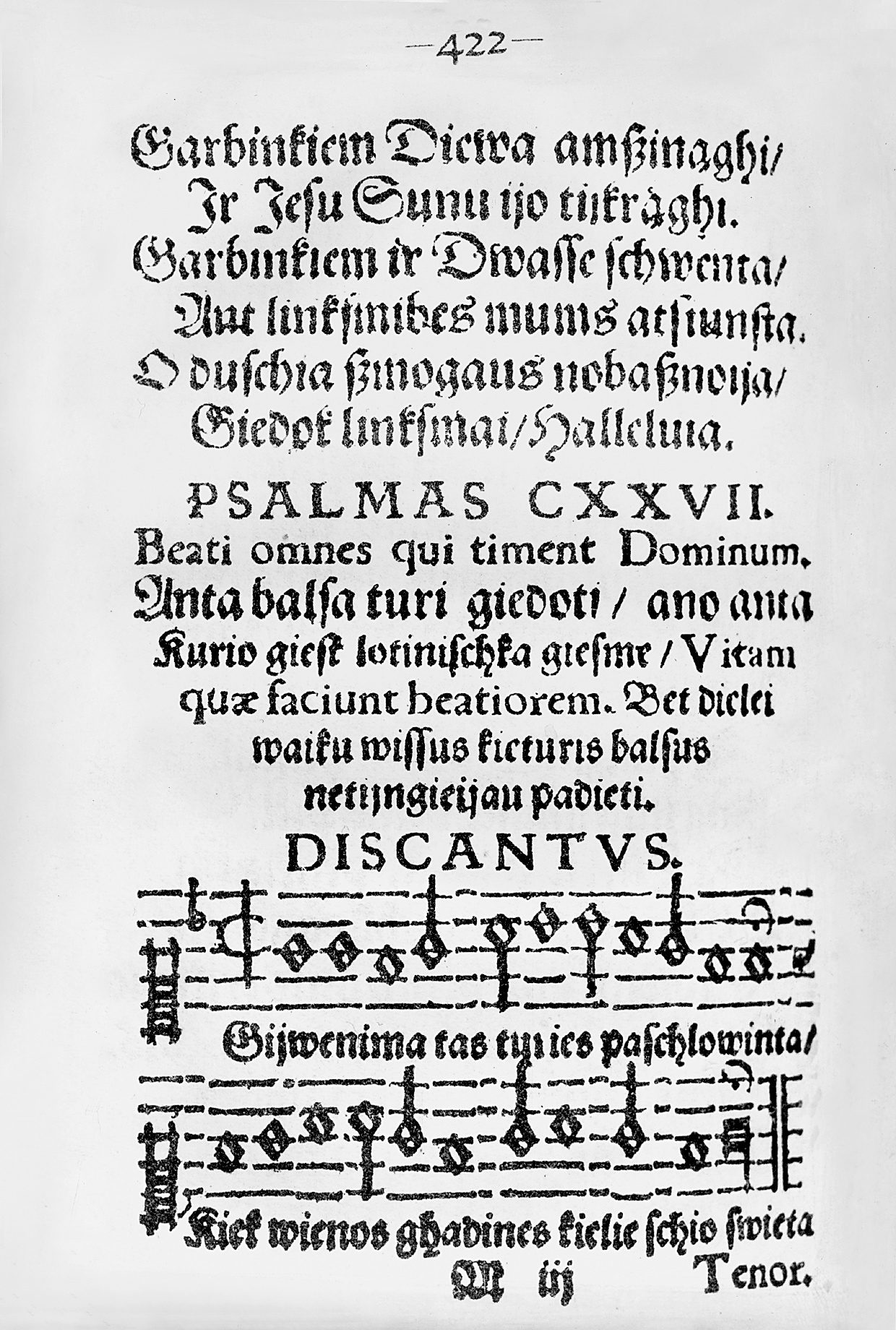
A fragment of Lithuanian psalm Gyvenimą tas turės by Martynas Mažvydas, 1570

Mažvydas was a prolific 16th century Lithuanian author, who is associated with the beginnings of Lithuanian literature. He was of Samogitian origin, born near Žemaičių Naumiestis (now in Šilutė district municipality) in the Grand Duchy of Lithuania; his parents were said to be indigent townspeople. Mažvydas spent his youth in Vilnius, where he worked together with other pioneering Lithuanian authors from the Grand Duchy of Lithuania, such as Abraomas Kulvietis, Jurgis Zablockis, and possibly Stanislovas Rapolionis. Later Mažvydas would publish some of their works.

In Roman Catholic Lithuania Mažvydas was persecuted for his Protestant leanings, which motivated him to accept an invitation from Duke Albrecht of Prussia to come to Königsberg. He entered Albertina University in 1546; in 1548 he graduated from the university with a bachelor's degree. The fact that Mažvydas graduated in one-and-a-half years suggests that he had studied elsewhere before – possibly in Kraków, or at the school established by Kulvietis in Vilnius. It has also been suggested that he was teaching at Albertina University.

To spread the new Protestant faith in Prussia, Duke Albrecht commissioned the translation and publication of Lutheran texts in Old Prussian and Lithuanian. In the year 1547, while still a student in Königsberg, Mažvydas and his collaborators compiled and published the first printed Lithuanian book Catechismusa Prasty Szadei ("The Simple Words of Catechism") at the Hans Weinreich printing works in an edition of no more than 300 copies. It was based on the Polish version of Martin Luther's "Kleiner Katechismus". This book shows characteristics of the Samogitian dialect of Lithuanian, with clearly visible Aukštaitian traits. It was printed at about the same time as the first books in neighbouring nations' languages: Polish in 1513 or 1514, Belarusian in 1522, Estonian in 1535, and Latvian in 1585.

In 1549, Mažvydas was appointed a priest in Ragainė, in the present-day town of Neman. In the same year he wrote and published The Song of St. Ambrosy, with a dedication in Lithuanian. In 1554 Mažvydas became the Archdeacon of Ragainė. He oversaw the education of his parishioners, regulated agricultural matters, and continued his literary work in Lithuanian. He translated "The Form of Baptism" from German into Lithuanian and published it in Königsberg in 1559. Between 1558 and 1562 he published "The Prussian Agenda" into the prayer "Paraphrasis", published in Königsberg in 1589, after the death of the translator. Another of his major works is "The Christian Songs" (Gesmes Chriksczoniskas, Gedomas Baszniczosu Per Aduenta ir Kaledas ik Gramniczu) (Part I, in 1566; Part II, in 1570), printed by his cousin Baltramiejus Vilentas. This book served as a basis for other Protestant books of songs that would later be published in Lithuania Minor.

Mažvydas initiated the patterns of several genres of Lithuanian literature: a primer; a catechism; a book of songs with notes; a prayer book; a translation of Holy Writ; and original prefaces and dedications.

He died in Königsberg (now Kaliningrad), aged about 53.

== The Catechism ==
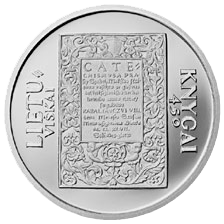
Litas commemorative coin dedicated to the Catechism's 450th anniversary

In the year 1547 Mažvydas compiled and published the first printed Lithuanian book – the Catechism (The Simple Words of Catechism), that was the beginning of literature and printing in Lithuanian. The book was printed in Königsberg.

The book consists of the dedication in Latin To the Grand Duchy of Lithuania, two prefaces: one in Latin (in prose), and one in Lithuanian (in verse), a primer, the catechism, and the book of songs. The rhymed preface in Lithuanian, The Appeal of The Small Book Itself Unto Lithuanians and Samogitians, is the first authentic verse in Lithuanian. An acrostic, the initial letters of its lines from 3 to 19 downwards, form the name of the author, Martinus Masvidius, thus confirming his authorship.

The prefaces state the aims of the author, namely, to educate people and spread culture, to fight the remains of heathen beliefs, and to consolidate the Protestant religion. The style of the preface is distinctly rhetorical; it is the most prominent example of syntactical-intonational prosody in Lithuanian literature.

Approximately 200 copies were printed; only two have survived. One is held at the Vilnius University Library in Lithuania, and another at Nicolaus Copernicus University in Toruń Library in Poland.

== Bibliography ==
- Catechismvsa prasty szadei, makslas skaitima raschta yr giesmes… – Königsberg: H. Weinreich, 1547. – 79p.
- Giesme s. Ambraseijaus bey s. Augustina… – Königsberg. H. Weinreich, 1549. – 16p.
- Forma chrikštima… – Königsberg: J. Daubman, 1559. – [42]p.
- Gesmes chriksczoniskas, gedomas bažniczosu per adventa ir kaledas ik gramniču / [išleido B.Vilentas]. – Königsberg: J. Daubman, 1566. – [94]p.
- Gesmes chrikščoniškas, gedomas bažniczosu per velikas ir sekminias ik adventa / [parengė ir išleido B.Vilentas]. – Königsberg: J. Daubman, 1570. – [350]p.
- Lietuviškos maldos. – Karaliaučius, 1574.
- Trumpas klausimas ir prieprovimas... // M.Liuteris Enchiridion: Katechismas mažas... – Königsberg: G.Osterberger, 1579, p.[67-72].
- Parafrasis permanitina poteraus malda… – Königsberg, G. Osterberger, 1589. – 14 p.
- Niemojewski, Marcin (2018). "Katechizm Martynasa Mažvydasa – o narodzinach litewskiego słowa drukowanego". Przegląd Środkowo-Wschodni. 3.
