= Magnus Pegel =

German doctor and mathematician

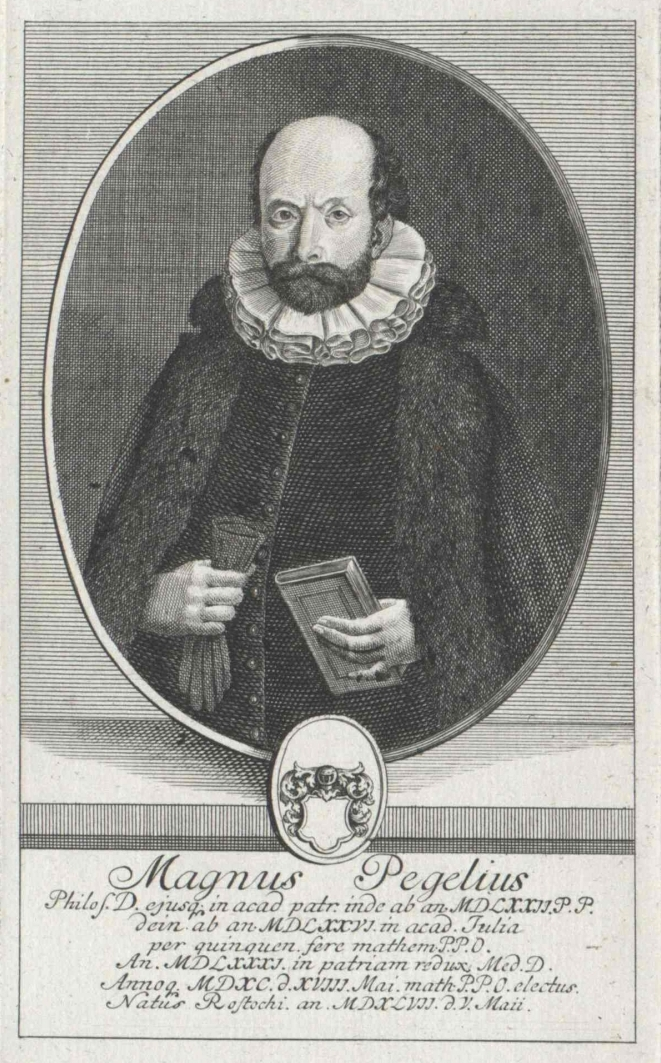
Magnus Pegel

Magnus Pegel (or Pegelius or Pegelow) (15 May 1547 – 1619) was a German doctor and mathematician. Pegel was born in Rostock in Pomerania/Germany and was one of the first authors to write (in 1604) about the theory of blood transfusions. He died at Stettin.

== Works ==
- "Disputatio de peste"
- "Universi seu mundi Diatyposis"
- "Thesaurus rerum selectarum"
- "Aphorismi thesum selectarum"
