= Abraomas Kulvietis =

Lithuanian nobleman and writer (c. 1509 – 1545)

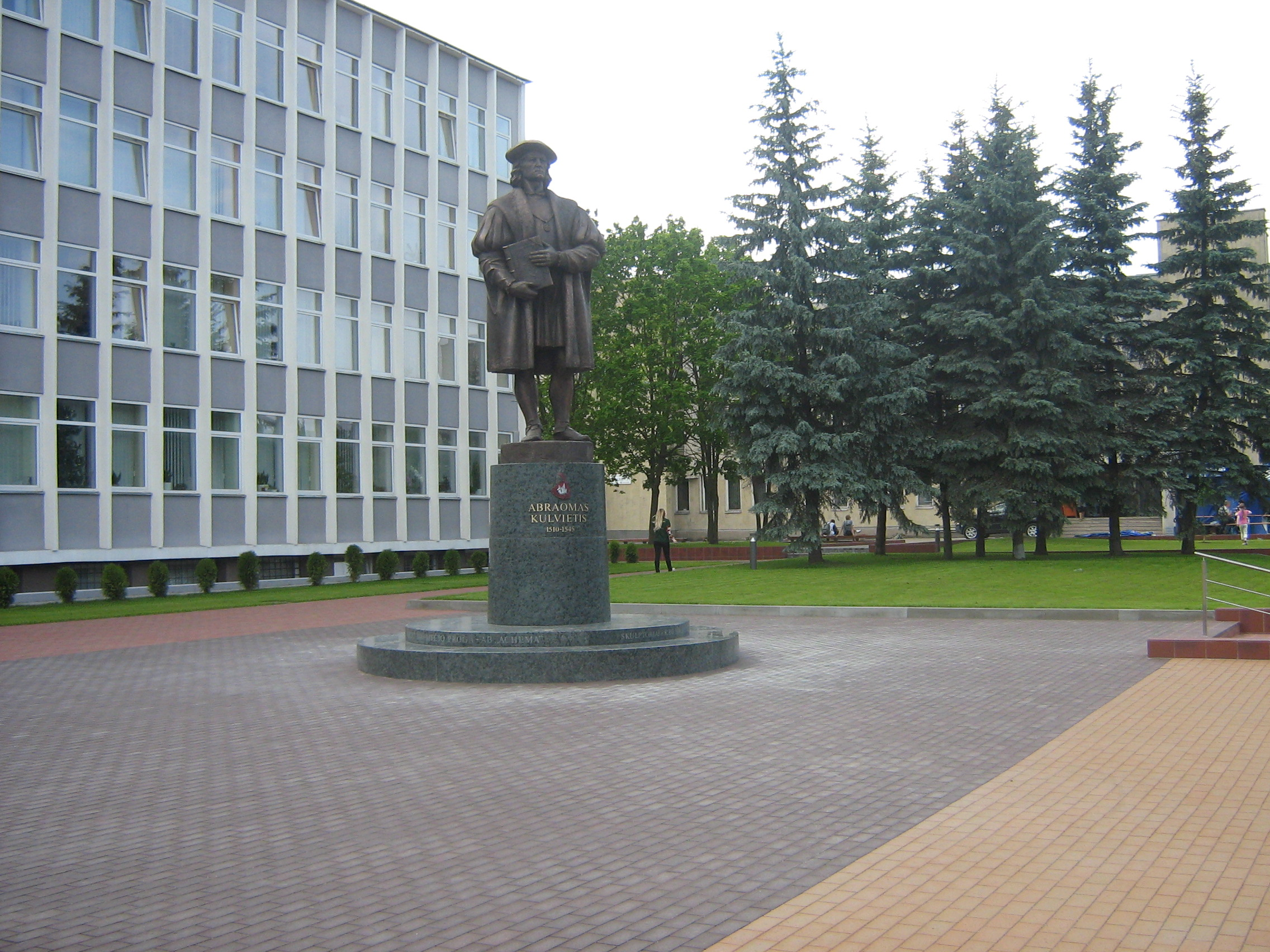
Abraomas Kulvietis monument in Jonava

Abraomas Kulvietis (Latin: Abraham Culvensis; Polish: Abraham Kulwieć; c. 1509 – 19 June 1545) was a Lithuanian jurist and a professor at Königsberg Albertina University, as well as a reformer of the church.

== Life ==
Kulvietis was born in Kulva, now in the Jonava district of Lithuania, into an old Lithuanian noble family of middle wealth. Between 1528 and 1537 he studied in many universities across Europe. At first in Cracow Academy, later, as he became aware of humanist reforms, he moved to the Catholic University of Leuven, where he studied the works of Desiderius Erasmus. He continued his education in Wittenberg, where he studied Martin Luther's teachings. In 1536 he moved to Leipzig and finally Siena, where in 1537 he was granted the title Doctor of Law.

After receiving his title, Kulvietis returned to the Great Duchy of Lithuania, giving lectures in Vilnius and working under the protection of Queen Bona Sforza and King of Poland and Grand Duke of Lithuania Sigismund II Augustus.

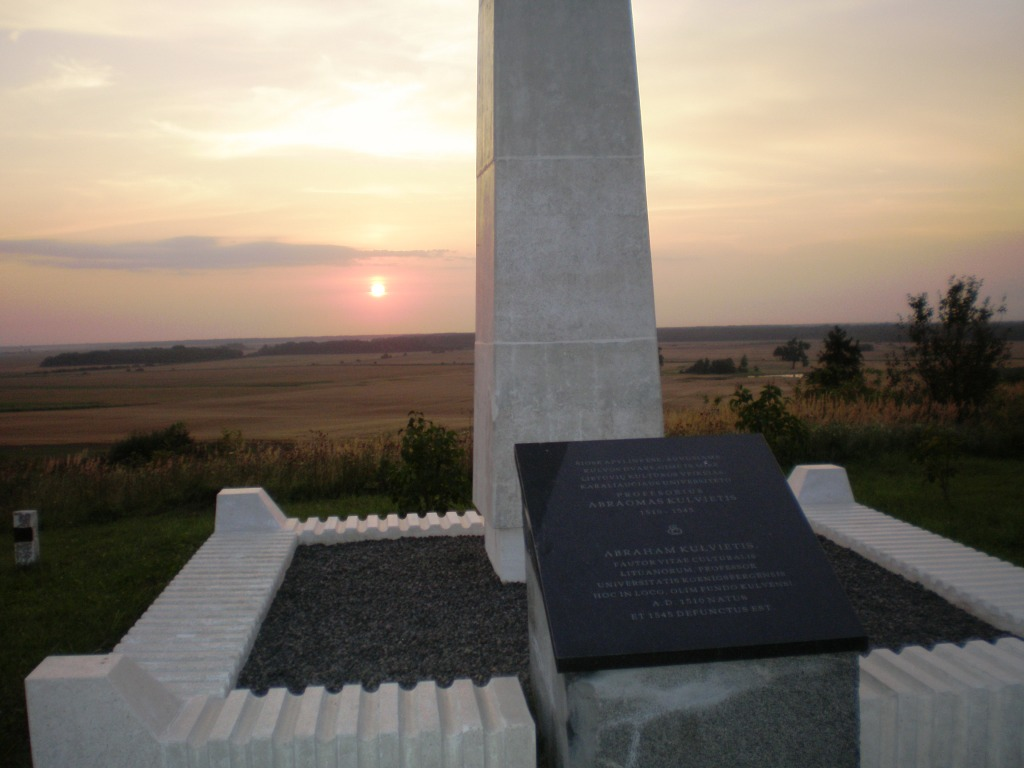
Abraomas Kulvietis' memorial near his birthplace

In 1540 Kulvietis founded his own school where he taught about 60 pupils in Lithuanian. He was generally unpopular among the Roman Catholic hierarchy because of his Lutheran beliefs, and when the queen was away in 1542 Kulvietis was forced to leave the country.

He was invited by Albert, Duke of Prussia together with other Lithuanian Lutherans, and together with them helped in the creation of the Königsberg Albertina University, and later he was the first professor of classic Hebrew and Greek. He was also the first translator of Lithuanian Evangelical songs.

In 1545, Kulvietis was allowed to visit his dying mother in Lithuania. Perhaps he was already ill with tuberculosis when he left the Duchy of Prussia, but is rumored to have been poisoned there by enemies and he died at his parents' home in Kulva.

Kulvietis's 24-line Lithuanian language hymnal "Malonus dėkavojimas Ponui Dievui" was printed in Martynas Mažvydas's collection Gesmes Chriksczoniskas, Gedomas Baszniczosu Per Aduenta ir Kaledas ik Gramniczu.

== Works ==
- "Confessio fidei Abr. Culvensis", 1543
