= Kulva =

- Village
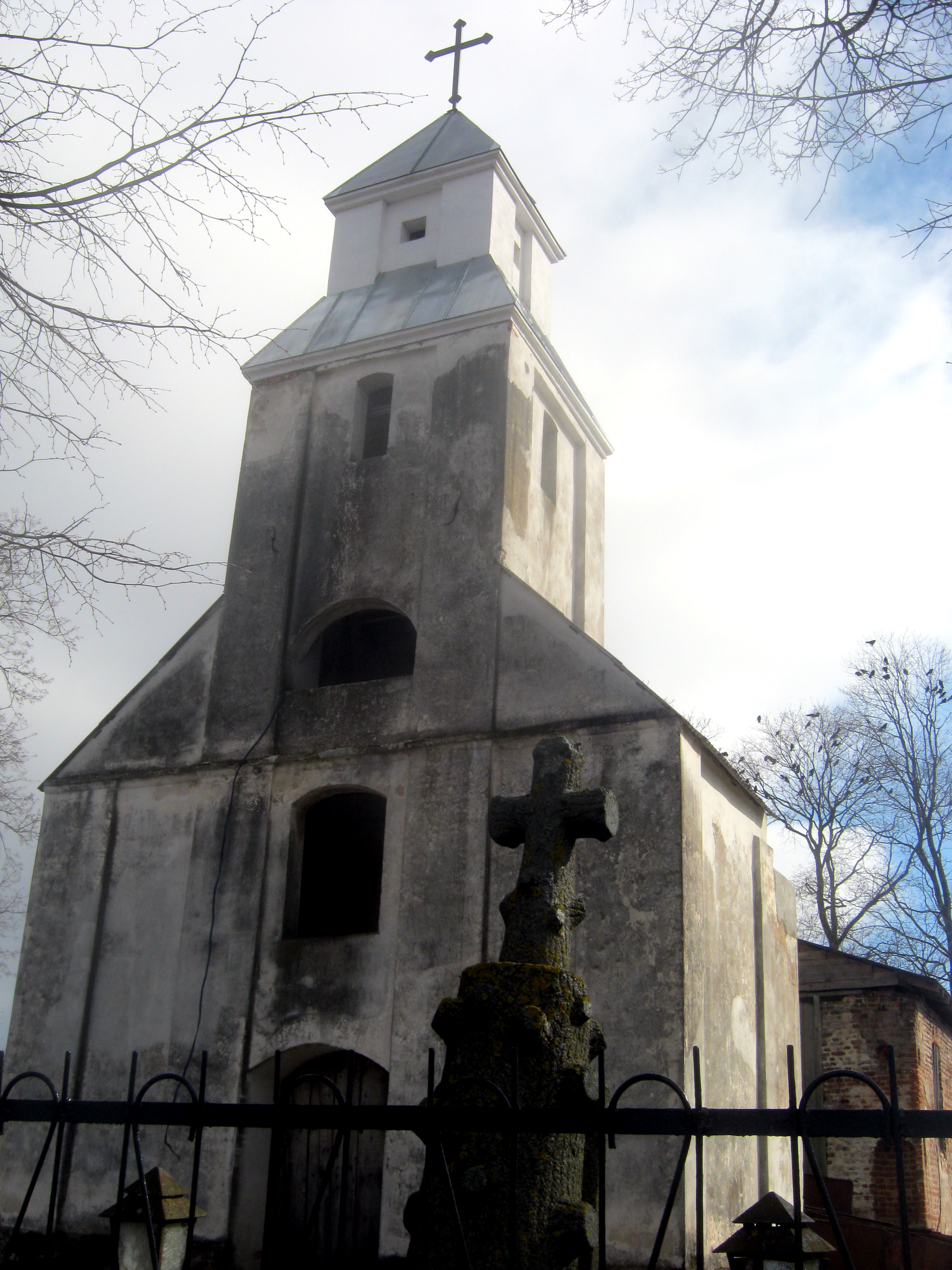

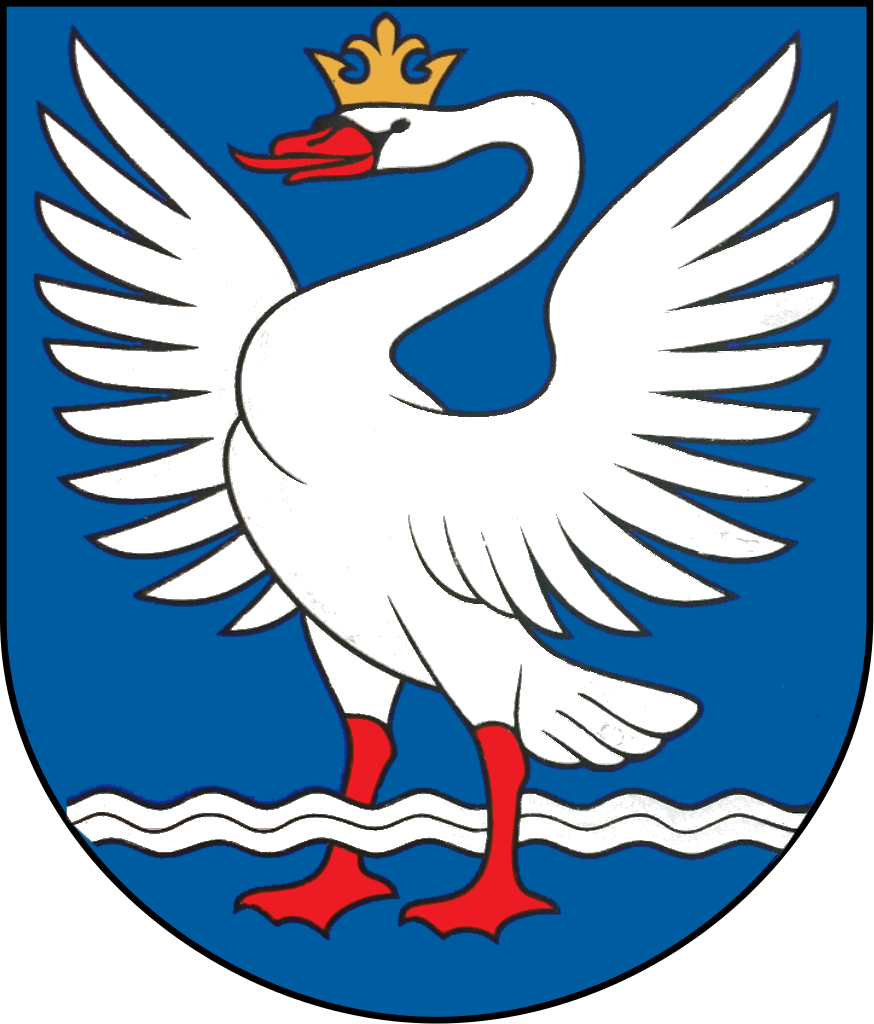
- Seal

- Location within Lithuania
- Coordinates: 55°06′30″N 24°10′40″E
- Country: Lithuania
- County: Kaunas County
- Municipality: Jonava

Population (2011)
  - Total: 378
- Time zone: UTC+2 (EET)
  - Summer (DST): UTC+3 (EEST)

Kulva is a village in Jonava district municipality, in Kaunas County, in central Lithuania. According to the 2011 census, the village has a population of 378 people.

== History ==
Kulva was first mentioned in written sources in 1382.

In the 16th century, Kulva built its first church, constructed out of wood. It had been replaced by a brick building by 1650. Enlargement of this church was completed in 1782.

== Education ==
- Kulva Abraomas Kulvietis primary school

== Famous villagers ==
- Abraomas Kulvietis, jurist and a professor at Königsberg Albertina University, as well as a reformer of the church.
