= 1549 =

1549 in various calendars
- Gregorian calendar: 1549; MDXLIX
- Ab urbe condita: 2302
- Armenian calendar: 998; ԹՎ ՋՂԸ
- Assyrian calendar: 6299
- Balinese saka calendar: 1470–1471
- Bengali calendar: 955–956
- Berber calendar: 2499
- English Regnal year: 2 Edw. 6 – 3 Edw. 6
- Buddhist calendar: 2093
- Burmese calendar: 911
- Byzantine calendar: 7057–7058
- Chinese calendar: 戊申年 (Earth Monkey); 4246 or 4039 — to — 己酉年 (Earth Rooster); 4247 or 4040
- Coptic calendar: 1265–1266
- Discordian calendar: 2715
- Ethiopian calendar: 1541–1542
- Hebrew calendar: 5309–5310
- Hindu calendars
- Vikram Samvat: 1605–1606
- Shaka Samvat: 1470–1471
- Kali Yuga: 4649–4650
- Holocene calendar: 11549
- Igbo calendar: 549–550
- Iranian calendar: 927–928
- Islamic calendar: 955–956
- Japanese calendar: Tenbun 18 (天文１８年)
- Javanese calendar: 1467–1468
- Julian calendar: 1549; MDXLIX
- Korean calendar: 3882
- Minguo calendar: 363 before ROC 民前363年
- Nanakshahi calendar: 81
- Thai solar calendar: 2091–2092
- Tibetan calendar: ས་ཕོ་སྤྲེ་ལོ་ (male Earth-Monkey); 1675 or 1294 or 522 — to — ས་མོ་བྱ་ལོ་ (female Earth-Bird); 1676 or 1295 or 523

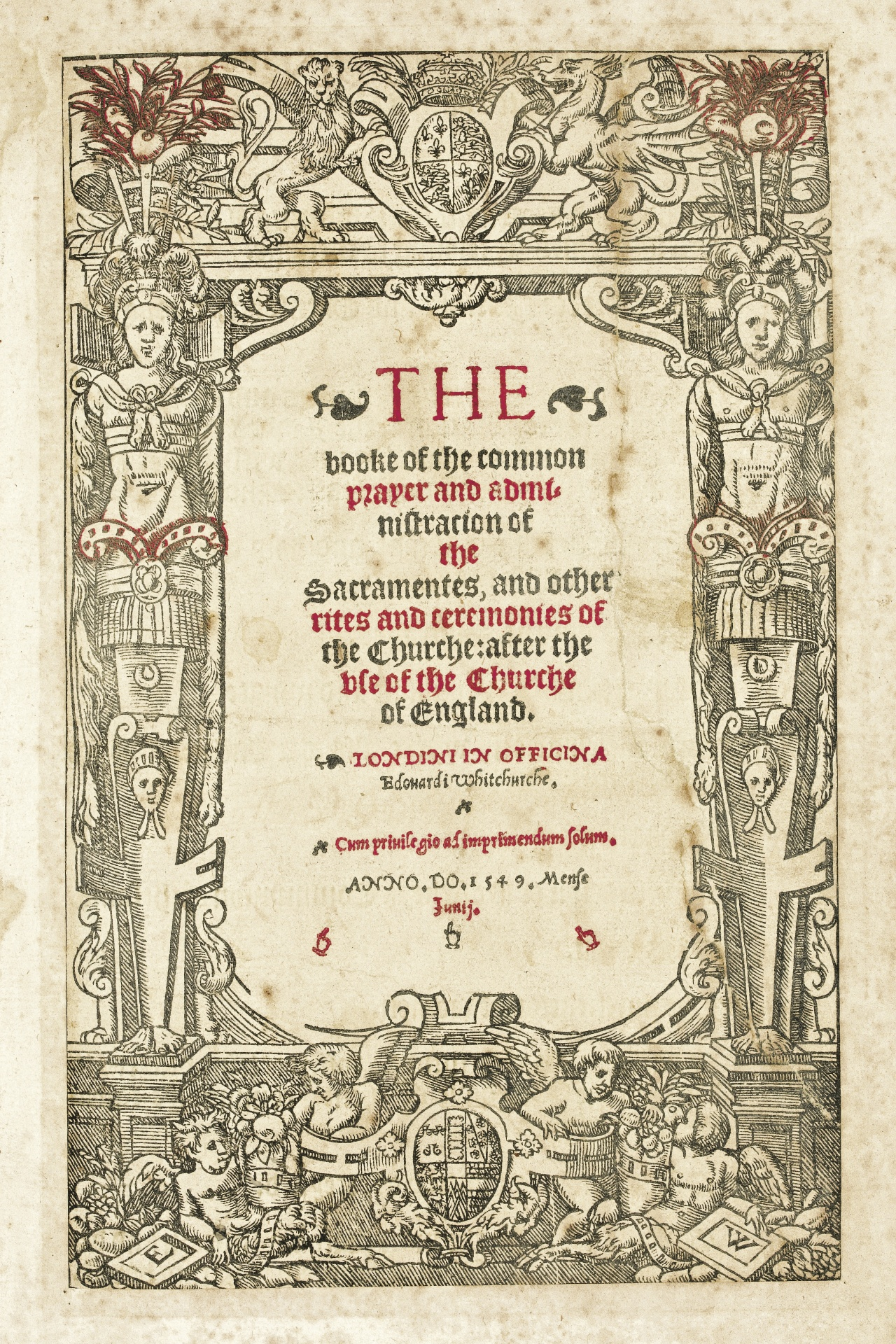
June 9: The Book of Common Prayer is mandated for all church services in England

July 27: Jesuit priest Francis Xavier arrives in Japan. (17th century painting in Kobe City Museum)

Year 1549 (MDXLIX) was a common year starting on Tuesday of the Julian calendar. In the Kingdom of England, it was known as "The Year of the Many-Headed Monster", because of the unusually high number of rebellions which occurred in the country.

== Events ==
=== January–March ===
- January 4 – Gaspare Grimaldi Bracelli begins a two-year term as the Doge of the Republic of Genoa in Italy, succeeding Benedetto Gentile Pevere.
- January 11 – An uprising of the Diaguitas natives outside of the South American Spanish colonial city of La Serena (now in Coquimbo province of Chile) begins. Within a day, the South American village is burned down and nearly every Spanish resident is killed.
- January 19 – Maha Chakkraphat is crowned as the King of Siam after having been installed on the throne in 1548 by Maha Thammaracha of Burma.
- January 21 – The Act of Uniformity 1548 is passed by the Parliament of England and establishes the 1549 version of the Book of Common Prayer as the sole legal prayer book in England, replacing the use of different versions of the Latin-language Missal.
- January – Burmese–Siamese War (1547–49): King Tabinshwehti of Burma begins his invasion of the Ayutthaya Kingdom, which ends in retreat.
- February 3 – Burmese–Siamese War: Burmese viceroy Thado Dhamma Yaza I of Prome slays Sri Suriyothai, queen consort of the Ayutthaya Kingdom, on her war elephant, when she intervenes in battle to protect the life of her husband.
- March 29 – The city of Salvador da Bahia, Brazil's first capital, is founded by Tome de Sousa.

=== April–June ===
- April 8 – Giovanni Angelo Medici is appointed as a Roman Catholic cardinal by Pope Paul III, effective May 10. In 1559, Medici is elected as Pope Pius IV.
- April 14 – Prince Zhu Zairui, age 12, heir to the throne of Ming dynasty China as the oldest living son of the Jiajing Emperor, dies a few days after becoming ill during the Guan Li coming of age ceremony.
- April 15 – Spanish Jesuit missionary Francis Xavier departs from Goa on a mission to bring Christian ministry to Japan.
- April 23 – In County Wicklow in Ireland, Phelim O'Toole is granted a pardon by the King for unspecified offenses.
- May 15 – King Henri II of France makes a triumphant return to Paris after suppressing the Revolt of the Pitauds in Bordeaux.

=== July–September ===
- June 9 – The Book of Common Prayer is introduced in English churches; the Prayer Book Rebellion against it breaks out in the West Country.
- June 19 – In the war of the Rough Wooing between Scotland and England, a Scottish and French force commanded by André de Montalembert retakes the island of Inchkeith, killing more than 300 soldiers from the English Army.
- July 8 – Kett's Rebellion, with 18,000 troops led by Robert Kett, breaks out at Wymondham in East Anglia, against fences and enclosures put up by wealthy landowners. and in Oxfordshire, against landowners associated with religious changes.
- July 18 – (Tenbun 18, 24th day of the 7th month) In the Battle of Eguchi, fought in Japan's Settsu Province near Osaka, General Miyoshi Nagayoshi defies the Governor, Hosokawa Harumoto, to attack the Eguchi Castle of Nagayoshi's cousin, Miyoshi Masanaga. After a 12-day battle, Miyoshi Masanaga is killed along with several of Hosokawa's other generals. Governor Hosokawa, fearing a reprisal, flees and eventually loses his authority over Settsu Province.
- July 21 – Thomas Cranmer, Archbishop of Canterbury, delivers his most important sermon, speaking at St Paul's Cathedral to defend the Church of England's reasons for uniformly requiring the use of The Book of Common Prayer.
- July 27 – (Tenbun 18, 3rd day of the 7th month) European Jesuit Francis Xavier arrives in Japan at the port of Kagoshima, the first Christian missionary there, but is not allowed to go to shore until three weeks later.
- July 29 – Norwich, in Norfolk falls to Kett's rebels.
- August 1– Kett's rebels defeat a Royal Army led by William Parr, Marquess of Northampton
- August 8– England and France declare war.
- August 15 – Francis Xavier, his translator Anjirō, and three other Jesuit priests are allowed to come ashore at Kagoshima in Japan.
- August 17 – Battle of Sampford Courtenay in England: The Prayer Book Rebellion is quashed.
- August 27 – At the Battle of Dussindale in England, Kett's Rebellion is ended by troops led by John Dudley, 1st Duke of Northumberland.
- September 17 – The Council of Trent is prorogued indefinitely.
- September 19 – The English Army abandons Haddington, East Lothian as it continues its retreat from Scottish and French forces.
- September 29 – Shimazu Takahisa, the ruling daimyo of Japan's Satsuma Province, welcomes the Jesuit party of Francis Xavier.

=== October–December ===
- October 5 – Sir Thomas Smith is replaced by Ambassador Nicholas Wotton as the second Secretary of State of England, primarily in charge of England's foreign affairs. Wotton serves for less than a year before being dispatched by King Edward VI back to France.
- October 11 – Edward Seymour, 1st Duke of Somerset, the Lord Protector of England and Lord High Treasurer since 1547, is arrested on orders of the Regency Council on charges of "ambition, vainglory, entering into rash wars" as well as malfeasance and improper use of the royal treasury.
- October 22 – Catherine of Habsburg, daughter of Ferdinand, Duke of Habsburg, marries Francesco III Gonzaga, Duke of Mantua. Francesco, only 16 years old, dies of pneumonia after only four months of marriage.
- November 4 – The Pragmatic Sanction is proclaimed by Charles V, Holy Roman Emperor. The Seventeen Provinces of the Habsburg Low Countries are declared inseparable.
- November 10 – Pope Paul III dies at the age of 81 after a reign of 15 years.
- December 3 – The papal conclave to decide on a successor to Pope Paul III, goes into session in the Apostolic Palace in Rome with 51 cardinal electors.Participants at the papal conclave agree to elect the next Pope by secret ballot.
- December 7 – Robert Kett is hanged from the walls of Norwich Castle after being found guilty of treason for leading Kett's Rebellion. His brother William is hanged from the walls of Wymondham Abbey on the same day.
- December 21 – Ottoman Empire Sultan Suleiman the Magnificent abandons his campaign against Safavid Iran after 21 months, during which he was unable to proceed further than Tabriz.

=== Date unknown ===
- Peter Canisius starts the Counter-Reformation in Bavaria.
- The spire of Lincoln Cathedral in England is blown down, leaving St. Olaf's Church, Tallinn, in Estonia as the World's tallest structure.
- Although trade existed between the two beforehand, in this year the Portuguese begin to send regular seasonal maritime trade missions to Ming dynasty China, at Sao João Island (also known as Shangchuan Island) near Macau.
- Siege of Kajiki: firearms are used for the first time in a siege in Japanese history. (The previous year's Battle of Uedahara was the first battle in which they were used.)
- Excerpta antiqua is published by Hervagius at Basel, Switzerland.
- Maidstone Grammar School is founded in England by Edward Seymour, Duke of Somerset.

== Births ==
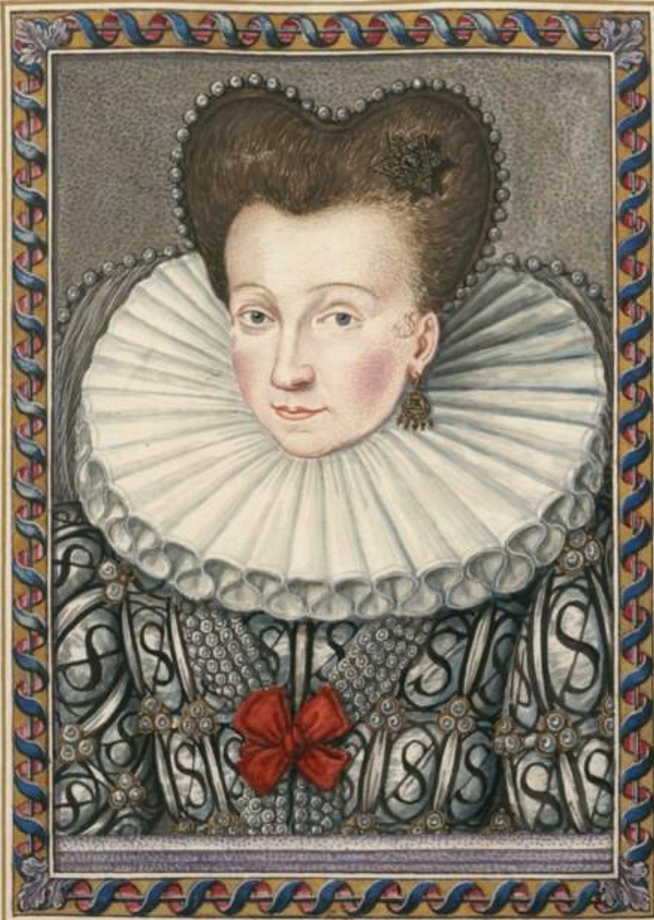
Françoise d'Orléans-Longueville

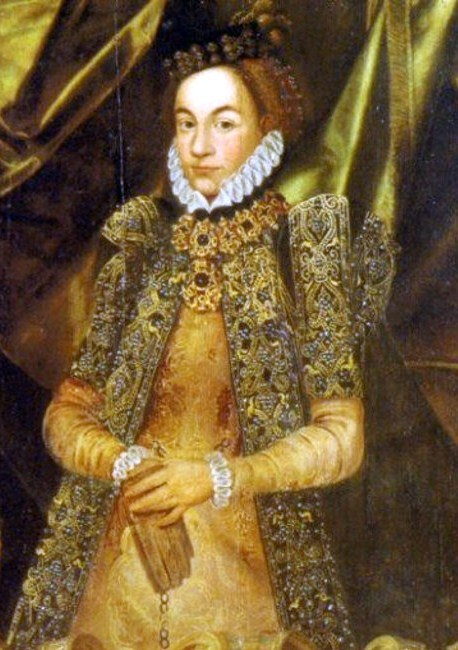
Duchess Sabine of Württemberg

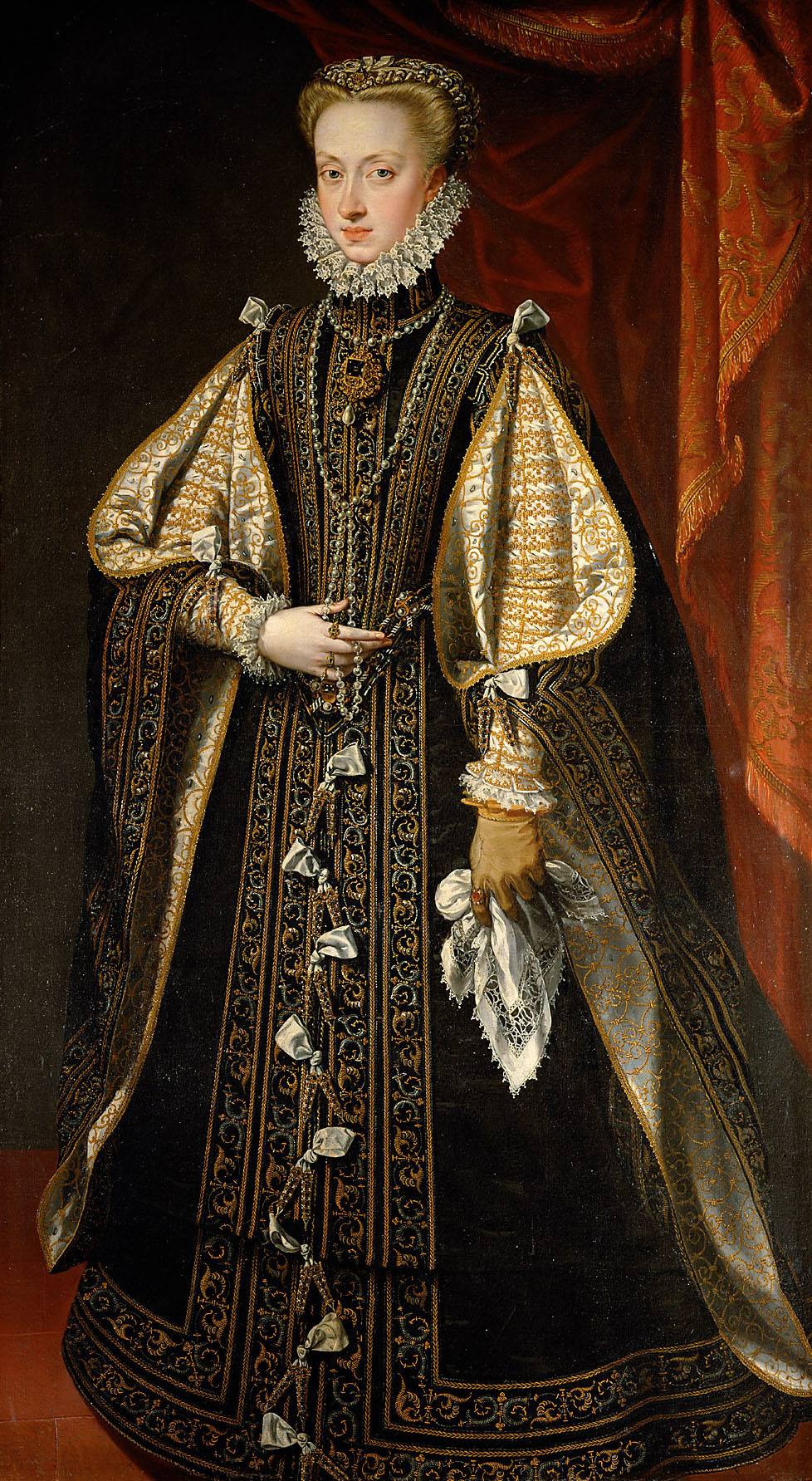
Anne of Austria, Queen of Spain

- January 26 – Jakob Ebert, German theologian (d. 1614)
- January 26 – Francesco Bassano the Younger, Italian painter (d. 1592)
- February 3 – Louis of Valois, French prince (d. 1550)
- February 4 – Eustache Du Caurroy, French composer (d. 1609)
- February 15 – Barnim X, Duke of Pomerania (1569–1603) (d. 1603)
- February 20 – Francesco Maria II della Rovere, last Duke of Urbino (d. 1631)
- March 10 – Francis Solanus, Spanish missionary and saint (d. 1610)
- March 11 – Hendrik Laurenszoon Spiegel, Dutch writer (d. 1612)
- April 5 – Françoise d'Orléans-Longueville, French princess (d. 1601)
- April 13 – Count Juraj IV Zrinski of Croatia (d. 1603)
- June 15 – Elizabeth Knollys, English noblewoman (d. 1605)
- July 2 – Duchess Sabine of Württemberg, by marriage Landgravine of Hesse-Kassel (d. 1581)
- July 5 – Francesco Maria del Monte, Italian Catholic cardinal (d. 1627)
- July 12 – Edward Manners, 3rd Earl of Rutland (d. 1587)
- July 20 – Pierre de Larivey, Italian-born French dramatist (d. 1619)
- July 30 – Ferdinando I de' Medici, Grand Duke of Tuscany (d. 1609)
- August 2 – Mikołaj Krzysztof "the Orphan" Radziwiłł, Polish nobleman (d. 1616)
- August 10 – Catherine of Brandenburg-Küstrin, daughter of Margrave John of Küstrin (d. 1602)
- September 1 – Charles Philippe de Croÿ, Marquis d’Havré, Belgian noble and politician (d. 1613)
- November 2 – Anna of Austria, Queen of Spain (d. 1580)
- November 5 – Philippe de Mornay, French writer (d. 1623)
- November 30 – Sir Henry Savile, English educator (d. 1622)
- December 9 – Costanzo Antegnati, Italian composer, organist (d. 1624)
- December 20 – John Petre, 1st Baron Petre, English politician and baron (d. 1613)
- December 24 – Kaspar Ulenberg, German theologian (d. 1617)
- date unknown
  - Kutsuki Mototsuna, Japanese military commander (d. 1632)
  - John Rainolds, English scholar and Bible translator (d. 1607)
  - Juan de Salcedo, Spanish conquistador (d. 1576)
  - Marek Sobieski, Polish noble (d. 1605)
  - Ogawa Suketada, Japanese warlord (d. 1601)

== Deaths ==
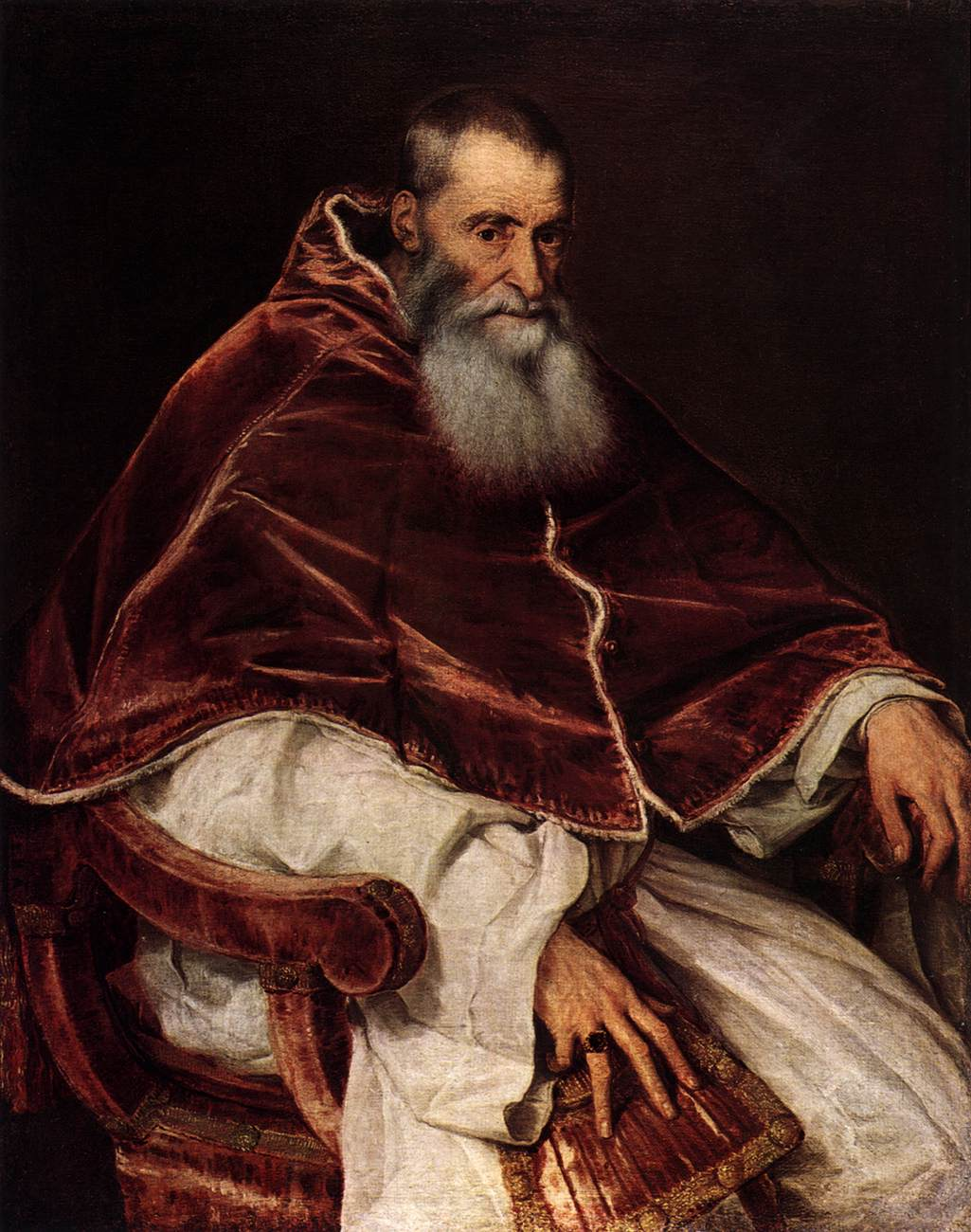
Pope Paul III

- January 28 – Elia Levita, German Yiddish writer (b. 1469)
- February 14 – Il Sodoma, Italian painter (b. 1477)
- March – Mingyi Swe, Burmese viceroy of Toungoo
- March 14 – Lorenzo Cybo, Italian condottiero (b. 1500)
- March 20 – Thomas Seymour, 1st Baron Seymour of Sudeley, English politician and diplomat (b. 1508)
- March 25 – Veit Dietrich, German theologian, writer and reformer (b. 1506)
- April – Andrew Boorde, English traveller (b. 1490)
- April 3 – Matsudaira Hirotada, Japanese daimyo (b. 1526)
- April 15 – Christine of Saxony, German noble (b. 1505)
- April 24 – Ralph Neville, 4th Earl of Westmorland, English earl (b. 1498)
- May 11 – María de Toledo, Vicereine and regent of the Spanish Colony of Santo Domingo (b. 1490)
- June 26 – Luis Cáncer, Spanish Dominican priest, missionary, martyr and servant of God (b. 1500)
- July 19 – Edmund Sheffield, 1st Baron Sheffield, English baron (b. 1521)
- August 11 – Otto I, Duke of Brunswick-Harburg, Prince of Lüneburg and Baron of Harburg (b. 1495)
- September 10 – Anthony Denny, confidant of Henry VIII of England (b. 1501)
- September 21 – Benedetto Accolti the Younger, Italian Catholic cardinal (b. 1497)
- October 27 – Marie d'Albret, Countess of Rethel, French nobility (b. 1491)
- November 10 – Pope Paul III (b. 1468)
- November 26 – Henry Somerset, 2nd Earl of Worcester (b. 1496)
- December 7 – Robert Kett, English rebel (executed)
- December 21 – Marguerite de Navarre, queen of Henry II of Navarre (b. 1492)
- date unknown
  - Daniel Bomberg, Brabantian printer
