= Kett's Rebellion =

1549 revolt in Norfolk, England

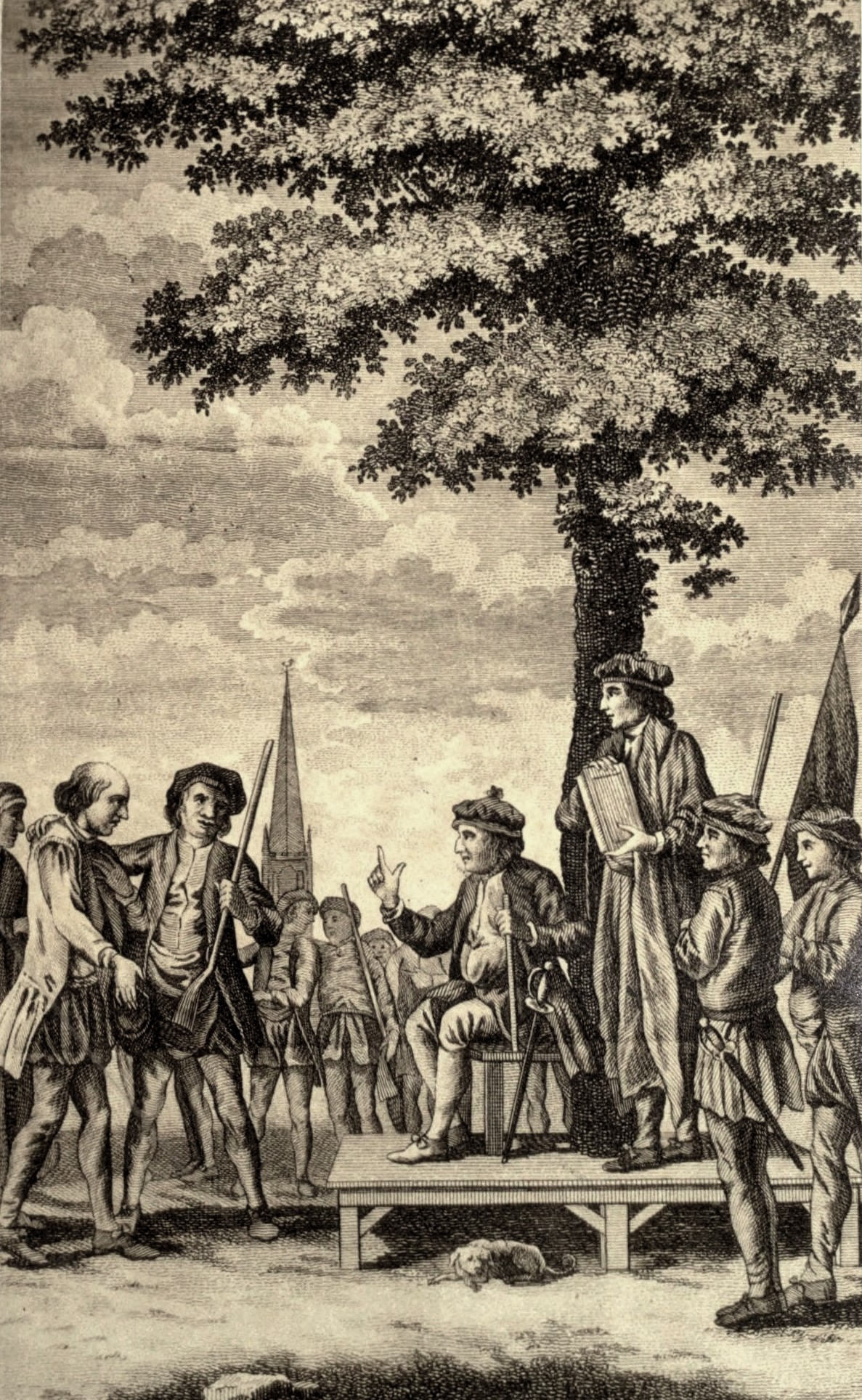
- Robert Kett and his followers on Mousehold Heath (from Kett's Rebellion in Norfolk (1859))
Date	8 July – 27 August 1549
Location	Norfolk
Result	Royal victory: Rebellion suppressed; Execution of rebel commanders

Belligerents
East Anglian rebels	Kingdom of England

Commanders and leaders
Robert Kett	(England) Edward Seymour, 1st Duke of Somerset; (England) John Dudley, 1st Earl of Warwick; (England) William Parr, 1st Marquess of Northampton

Strength
~16,000 rebels	~12,000 troops; ~1,200 German and Italian mercenaries

Casualties and losses
At least 3,000 killed; Unknown wounded	~250 killed
- ~3,250 deaths

Kett's Rebellion was a revolt in the English county of Norfolk during the reign of Edward VI, largely in response to the enclosure of land. It began at Wymondham on 8 July 1549 with a group of rebels destroying fences that had been put up by wealthy landowners. One of their targets was yeoman Robert Kett who, instead of resisting the rebels, agreed to their demands and offered to lead them. Kett and his forces, joined by recruits from Norwich and the surrounding countryside and numbering some 16,000, set up camp on Mousehold Heath to the north-east of the city on 12 July.

The rebels stormed Norwich on 29 July and took the city. On 1 August the rebels defeated a Royal Army led by the Marquess of Northampton who had been sent by the government to suppress the uprising. Kett's rebellion ended on 27 August when the rebels were defeated by an army under the leadership of the Earl of Warwick at the Battle of Dussindale. Kett was captured, held in the Tower of London, tried for treason, and hanged from the walls of Norwich Castle on 7 December 1549.

== Background ==
The 1540s saw a crisis in agriculture in England. With the majority of the population depending on the land, this led to outbreaks of unrest across the country. Kett's rebellion in Norfolk was the most serious of these. The main grievance of the rioters was enclosure, the fencing of common land by landlords for their own use. Enclosure left peasants with nowhere to graze their animals. Some landowners were forcing tenants off their farms so that they could engross their holdings and convert arable land into pasture for sheep, which had become more profitable as demand for wool increased. Inflation, unemployment, rising rents, and declining wages added to the hardships faced by the common people. As the historian Julian Cornwall put it, they "could scarcely doubt that the state had been taken over by a breed of men whose policy was to rob the poor for the benefit of the rich".

== Uprising at Wymondham ==
Kett's rebellion, or "the commotion time" as it was also called in Norfolk, began in July 1549 in the small market town of Wymondham, some ten miles south-west of Norwich. The previous month, there had been a minor disturbance at the nearby town of Attleborough where fences, built by the lord of the manor to enclose common lands, were torn down. The rioters thought they were acting legally, since Edward Seymour (1st Duke of Somerset, and Lord Protector during part of Edward VI's minority) had issued a proclamation against illegal enclosures. Wymondham held its annual feast on the weekend of 6 July 1549 and a play in honour of St Thomas Becket, the co-patron of Wymondham Abbey, was performed. This celebration was illegal, as Henry VIII had decreed in 1538 that the name of Thomas Becket should be removed from the church calendar. On the Monday, when the feast was over, a group of people set off to the villages of Morley St. Botolph and Hethersett to tear down hedges and fences. One of their first targets was Sir John Flowerdew, a lawyer and landowner at Hethersett who was unpopular for his role as overseer of the demolition of Wymondham Abbey (part of which was the parish church) during the dissolution of the monasteries and for enclosing land. Flowerdew bribed the rioters to leave his enclosures alone and instead attack those of Robert Kett at Wymondham.

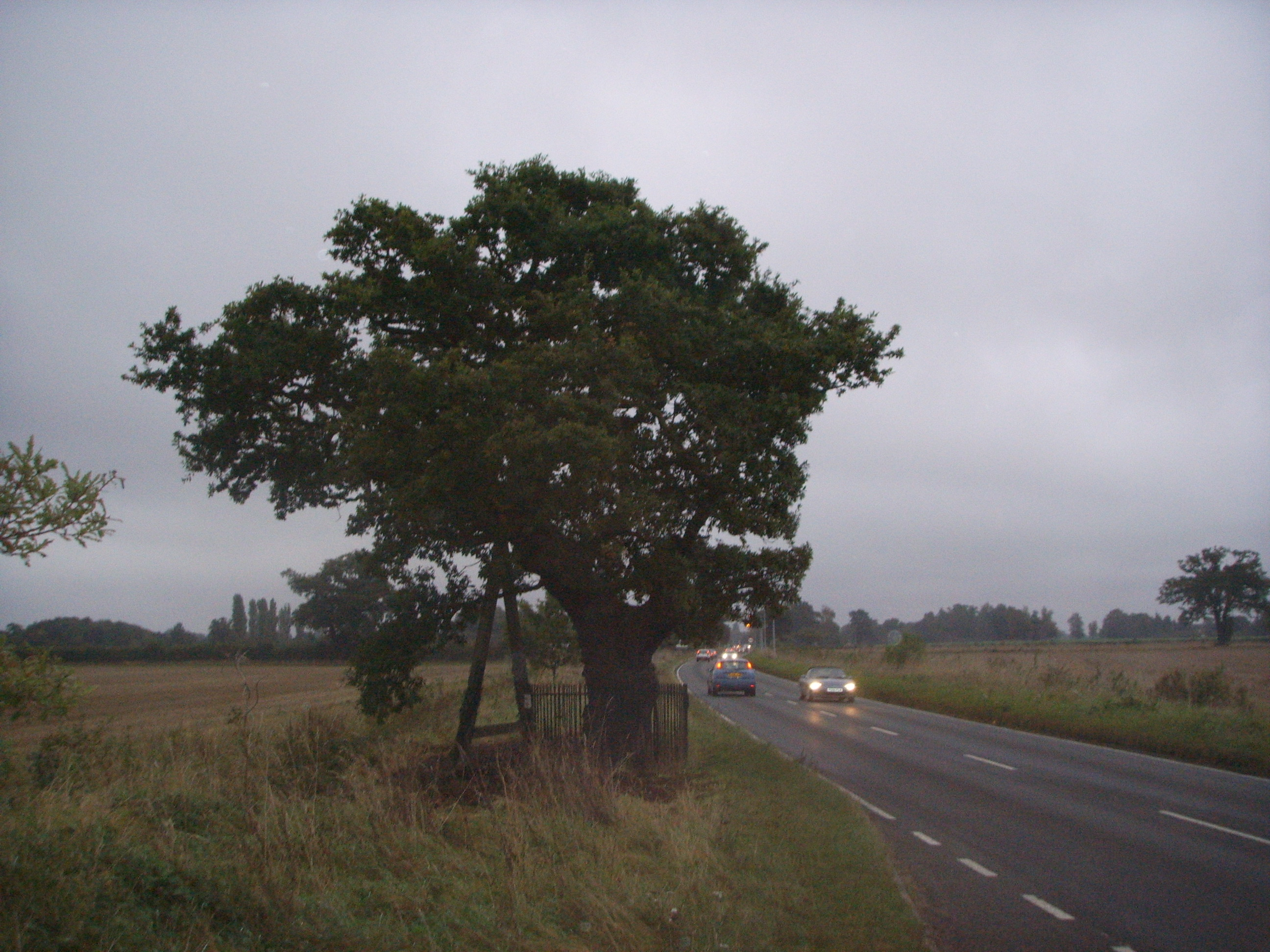
Kett's Oak, beside the B1172, near Hethersett, Norfolk

Kett was about 57 years old and was one of the wealthier farmers in Wymondham. The Ketts (also spelt Ket, Cat, Chat, or Knight) had been farming in Norfolk since the twelfth century. Kett was the son of Thomas and Margery Kett and had several brothers; clergyman Francis Kett was his nephew. Two or possibly three of Kett's brothers were dead by 1549, but his eldest brother William joined him in the rebellion. Kett's wife, Alice, and several sons are not recorded as having been involved in the rebellion. Kett had been prominent among the parishioners in saving their parish church when Wymondham Abbey was demolished and this had led to conflict with Flowerdew. Having listened to the rioters' grievances, Kett decided to join their cause and helped them tear down his own fences before taking them back to Hethersett where they destroyed Flowerdew's enclosures. The following day, Tuesday 9 July, the protesters set off for Norwich. By now Kett was their leader and they were being joined by people from nearby towns and villages. A local tradition holds that a meeting point for the rebels was an oak tree on the road between Wymondham and Hethersett, where nine of the rebels were later hanged. Known as Kett's Oak, it has been preserved by Norfolk County Council. The oak became a symbol of the rebellion when an oak tree on Mousehold Heath was made the centre of the rebel camp, but this "Oak of Reformation" no longer stands. According to one source the Oak of Reformation was cut down by Norwich City Council in the 1960s to make way for a car park, although Reg Groves wrote in the 1940s that it had already been destroyed.

== Bowthorpe, Eaton, and Drayton ==
Kett and his followers camped for the night of 9 July at Bowthorpe, just west of Norwich. Here they were approached by a local official, either Nicholas L'Estrange, Sheriff of Norfolk and Suffolk, or former sheriff Sir Edmund Wyndham, who ordered them to disperse. The response was negative, and the official retreated to Norwich. (Note: MacCulloch (1979, p. 42) points out that Raphael Holinshed's account is the only source attributing this meeting to Wyndham, and his description of the encounter may have confused Wyndham with L'Estrange. Wyndham would have been acting in a private capacity, as he was not reappointed Sheriff until November of that year.) Next the rebels were visited by the Mayor of Norwich, Thomas Codd, who met a similar response. The following night the rebels camped at nearby Eaton Wood and then, having been refused permission to march through Norwich to reach Mousehold Heath north-east of the city, crossed the River Wensum at Hellesdon and spent the night at Drayton.

== Rebel base on Mousehold Heath ==
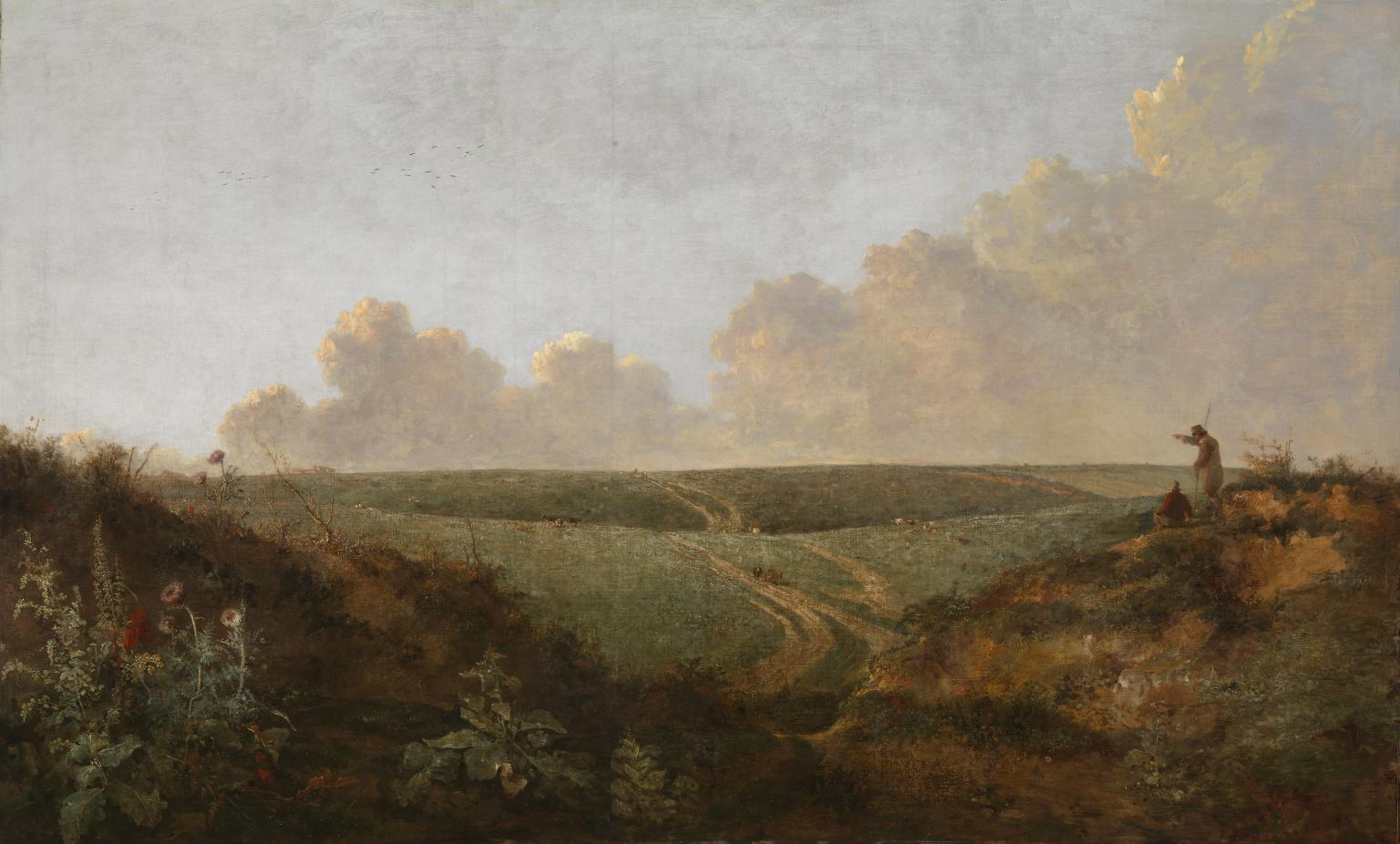
John Crome, Mousehold Heath, Norwich (c. 1818-1820), Tate Britain

On Friday 12 July, the rebels reached Mousehold, where they had a vantage point overlooking Norwich, and set up the camp that was their base for the next six and a half weeks. The camp was the largest of several rebel camps that had appeared in East Anglia that summer. The rebels were known at the time as the "camp men" and the rebellion as the "camping tyme" or "commotion tyme".

Kett set up his headquarters in St Michael's Chapel, the ruins of which have since been known as Kett's Castle. Mount Surrey, a house built by the Earl of Surrey on the site of the despoiled St Leonard's Priory, had lain empty since the Earl's execution in 1547 and was used to hold Kett's prisoners. Kett's council, which consisted of representatives from the Hundreds of Norfolk and one representative from Suffolk met under the Oak of Reformation to administer the camp, issuing warrants to obtain provisions and arms and arrest members of the gentry. The camp was joined by workers and artisans from Norwich, and by people from the surrounding towns and villages, until it was larger than Norwich, at that time the second-largest city in England with a population of about 12,000. The city authorities, having sent messengers to London, remained in negotiation with the rebels and Mayor Thomas Codd, former Mayor Thomas Aldrich, and preacher Robert Watson accepted the rebels' invitation to take part in their council.

Once the camp was established at Mousehold the rebels drew up a list of 29 grievances, signed by Kett, Codd, Aldrich, and the representatives of the Hundreds, and sent it to Protector Somerset. The grievances have been described by one historian as a shopping-list of demands which nevertheless have a strong logic underlying them, articulating "a desire to limit the power of the gentry, exclude them from the world of the village, constrain rapid economic change, prevent the overexploitation of communal resources, and remodel the values of the clergy".

Although the rebels were all the while tearing down hedges and filling in ditches, only one of the 29 articles mentioned enclosure: 'We pray your grace that where it is enacted for enclosing, that it be not hurtful to such as have enclosed saffren grounds, for they be greatly chargeable to them, and that from henceforth no man shall enclose any more.' The exemption for 'saffren grounds' has puzzled historians; one has suggested that it may have been a scribal error for 'sovereign grounds', grounds that were the exclusive freehold property of their owners, while others have commented on the importance of saffron to local industry.

The rebels also asked 'that all bondmen may be made free, for God made all free, with his precious blood shedding.' The rebels may have been articulating a grievance against the 1547 Act for the Punishment of Vagabonds, which made it legal to enslave a discharged servant who did not find a new master within three days, though they may also have been calling for the manumission of the thousands of Englishmen and women who were serfs. (In 1549, an Act Touching on the Punishment of Vagabonds and Other Idle Persons avoided the word "slave" but retained many of the harshest provisions of the 1547 Act.)

The list of demands also included calls for a reduction in rents, the punishment of corrupt officials and the replacement of counsellors to the king (both clerical and lay) who enriched themselves at the expense of the state—a direct reference to Protector Somerset’s regency council. The rebels used the new prayer book for their open air services, and urged that parish priests who failed to "set forth the word of God" to their parishioners should be replaced.

== Events from 12 July 1549 ==
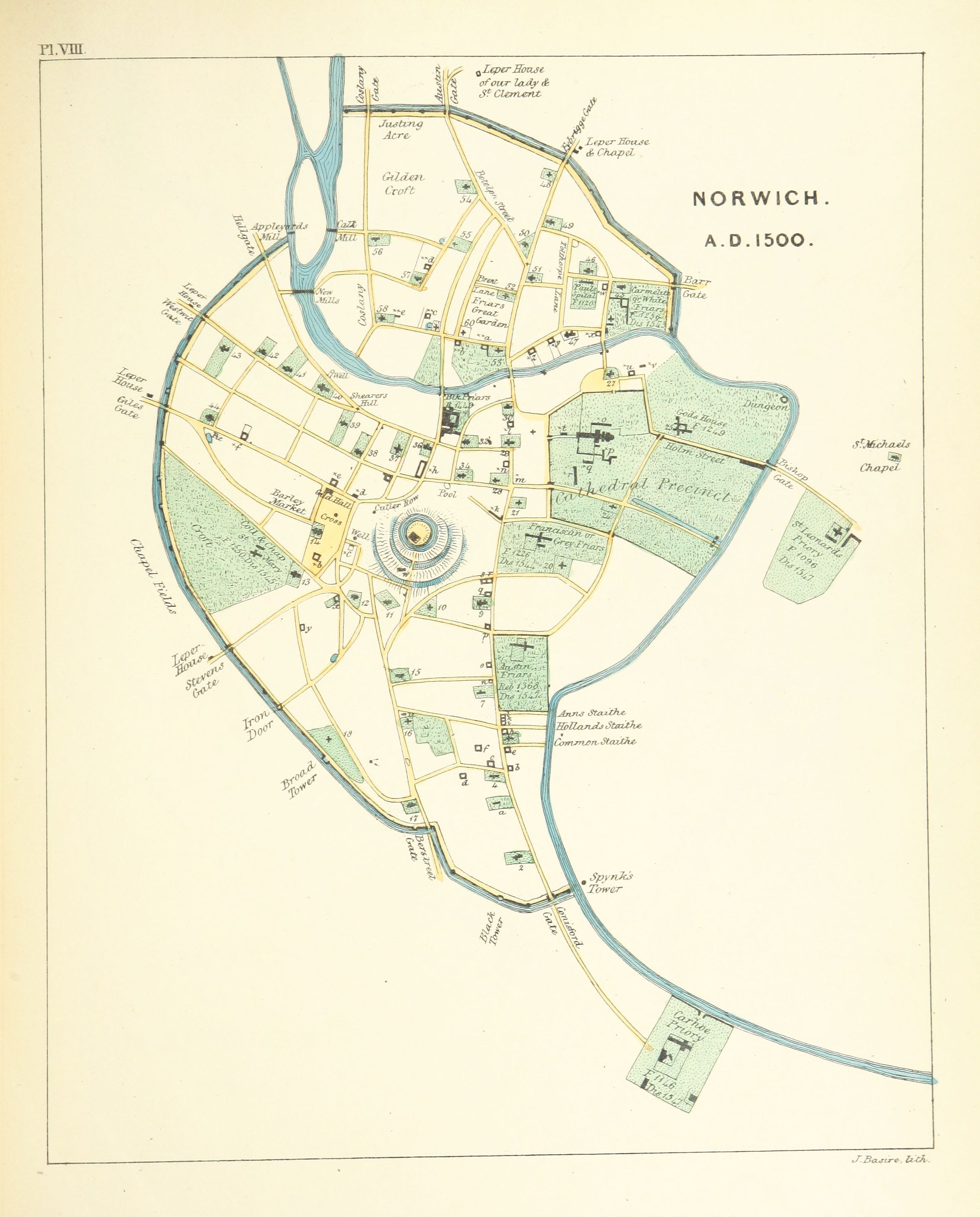
A map of 16th-century Norwich, from Samuel Woodward's The History and Antiquities of Norwich Castle (1847)

The truce between the city and the camp was ended on 21 July by a messenger from the King's Council, York Herald Bartholomew Butler, who arrived at Norwich from London, went with city officials to Mousehold, proclaimed the gathering a rebellion, and offered pardon. Kett rejected the offer, saying he had no need of a pardon because he had committed no treason. York Herald lacked the forces to arrest the rebels and retreated into Norwich with the Mayor. Kett and his followers were now officially rebels; the authorities therefore shut the city gates and set about preparing the city defences.

=== Fall of Norwich ===
On 22 July 1549, Kett proposed a truce but the offer was rejected by the city authorities and the rebels commenced an attack on Bishopsgate Bridge. They charged down from Mousehold and began swimming the Wensum between the Cow Tower and Bishopsgate. The city defenders fired volleys of arrows into the rebels as they crossed, but could not stop the attack and Norwich quickly fell to the rebels. The rebels captured guns and other military supplies and set up guards at strategic points. The York Herald offered a second pardon to the rebels. It was again rejected and the Herald left for London, leaving England's second largest city in the hands of a rebel army. There was no random violence. Civic leaders were taken to Mousehold and imprisoned in Surrey House. Mayor Codd was released and stayed in the rebel camp, while his deputy Augustine Steward remained in the city.

=== Attacks on the rebels ===
The King sent the Marquess of Northampton with about 1,400 men, including Italian mercenaries, to quell the rebellion. As he drew near to the city he sent forward his herald to demand the surrender of the city. Deputy Mayor Augustine Steward consulted Mayor Codd, who was still on Mousehold and then opened the city gates to Northampton's army, the rebels having withdrawn back to the safety of the high ground overlooking the city. Kett had already seen how difficult it was to defend miles of walls and gates and thought it more prudent to allow Northampton's small army to defend the city while he again laid siege to it.

On the night of 31 July, the Royal army made its defensive preparations and started patrolling the city's narrow streets. Around midnight alarms rang out, waking Northampton. It appeared hundreds of rebels were using the cover of darkness and their knowledge of the maze of small streets and alleys around Tombland to launch hit-and-run attacks on Royal troops. After three hours Northampton's men had driven off the rebels, who suffered heavy casualties.

By 8 am the following morning, 1 August, the ramparts were strengthened between the Cow Tower and Bishopsgate, so Lord Sheffield retired to The Maid's Head inn for breakfast. A little after this, Northampton received information that the rebels wished to discuss surrender and were gathering around the Pockthorpe gate. Sheffield went with the Herald to discuss this apparent good turn of events with the rebels. On arrival, Sheffield found no rebels at all. It appears to have been either a false rumour or a diversion, as at that point thousands of rebels again began crossing the River Wensum around Bishopsgate.

Northampton's main force was in the market place. As the attack developed, he fed men through the streets into a growing and vicious street battle across the whole eastern area of the city. Seeing things going the rebels' way, Sheffield took command of a body of cavalry and charged the rebels across the cathedral precinct, past St Martin at Place Church and into Bishopsgate Street. Outside the Great Hospital in Bishopsgate Street, Sheffield fell from his horse into a ditch. Expecting then to be captured and ransomed, as was the custom, he removed his helmet, only to be killed by a blow from a rebel, reputedly a butcher named Fulke. With the loss of a senior commander and his army being broken up in street fighting, Northampton ordered a retreat.

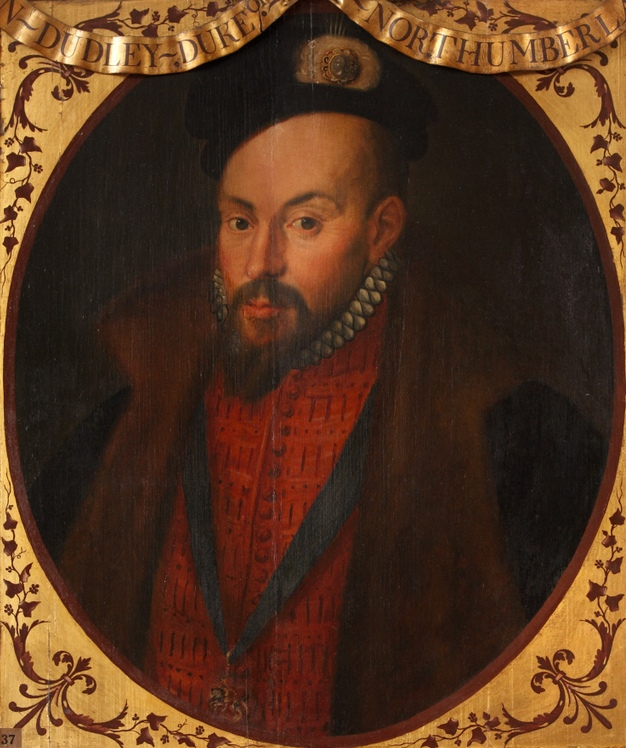
The Earl of Warwick led the force that defeated the rebels

The Earl of Warwick was then sent with a stronger army of around 14,000 men including mercenaries from Wales, Germany, and Spain. Warwick had previously fought in France, was a former member of the House of Commons and subsequently the Privy Council, making him a strong leader. Despite the increased threat, the rebels were loyal to Kett throughout and continued to fight Warwick's men.

Northampton served as Warwick's second-in-command in the second attempt to deal with the rebel host, this time with a much larger force. Warwick managed to enter the city on 24 August by attacking the St Stephen's and Brazen gates. The rebels retreated through the city, setting fire to houses as they went in an attempt to slow the Royal army's advance. About 3 pm Warwick's baggage train entered the city. It managed to get lost and rather than halting in the market place it continued through Tombland and straight down Bishopsgate Street towards the rebel army. A group of rebels saw the train from Mousehold and ran down into the city to capture it. Captain Drury led his men in an attempt to recapture the train, which included all the artillery. He managed to salvage some of the guns in yet another fierce fight around Bishopsgate.

On 25 August the rebels commenced an artillery attack on the walls around the northern area of the city near the Magdalen and Pockthorpe gates. With the north of the city again in rebel hands, Warwick launched an attack. Bitter street fighting eventually cleared the city once again.

=== Rebels' defeat at Dussindale ===
On 26 August, 1,400 foreign mercenaries arrived in the city. These were German "landsknechts", a mix of musketeers and zweihander-swordsmen. With these reinforcements, Warwick now had a formidable army with which to face the rebels. Kett and his people were aware of this, and that night they left their camp at Mousehold for lower ground in preparation for battle. During the morning of 27 August, the armies faced each other outside the city. The final battle took place at Dussindale, and was a disaster for the rebels. In the open, against well-armed and trained troops, they were routed and thousands were killed.

The location of Dussindale has not been established with certainty, but battlefield debris (musket balls and other lead shot—iron artefacts such as arrowheads having not readily survived) have suggested Long Valley, Norwich, now a partly built-up area to the north-east of the city centre. An alternative location, further to the east, is suggested by Anne Carter of Norfolk Archaeology, who found in parish records references to "Dussings Dale" adjoining the common of the village of Great Plumstead (52.63°N 1.37°E). A map regression analysis published by the Council for British Archaeology supports Carter's proposition, but its conclusion placed the exact spot some 200 metres to the west.

== Aftermath ==
About 3,000 rebels are thought to have been killed at Dussindale, with Warwick's army losing some 250 men. The morning after the battle, 28 August, rebels were hanged at the Oak of Reformation and outside the Magdalen Gate. Estimates of the number vary from 30 to 300. Warwick had already executed 49 rebels when he had entered Norwich a few days before. There is only one attested incident in which the rebels had killed in cold blood: one of Northampton's Italian mercenaries had been hanged following his capture.

Kett was captured at the village of Swannington the night after the battle and taken, together with his brother William, to the Tower of London to await trial for treason. Found guilty, the brothers were returned to Norwich at the beginning of December. Kett was hanged from the walls of Norwich Castle on 7 December 1549; on the same day William was hanged from the west tower of Wymondham Abbey.

== Legacy and commemoration ==
"In 1549 AD Robert Kett yeoman farmer of Wymondham was executed by hanging in this Castle after the defeat of the Norfolk Rebellion of which he was leader. In 1949 AD – four hundred years later – this Memorial was placed here by the citizens of Norwich in reparation and honour to a notable and courageous leader in the long struggle of the common people of England to escape from a servile life into the freedom of just conditions"

— Plaque on the wall of Norwich Castle

In 1550, the Norwich authorities decreed that in future 27 August should be a holiday to commemorate "the deliverance of the city" from Kett's Rebellion, and paid for lectures in the cathedral and parish churches on the sins of rebellion. This tradition continued for over a century.

The rising was discussed by Sir John Cheke in The hurt of sedicion howe greueous it is to a commune welth, (1549). The only known surviving eye-witness account of the rebellion, a manuscript by a Nicholas Sotherton, son of a Norwich mayor, is hostile towards the rebels. So too is Alexander Neville's 1575 Latin history of the rebellion, De furoribus Norfolciensium. Neville was secretary to Matthew Parker, who had preached to Kett's followers under the Oak of Reformation on Mousehold, unsuccessfully appealing to them to disperse. In 1615 Neville's work was translated into English by Norfolk clergyman Richard Woods under the title Norfolke Furies and was reprinted throughout the following century. Francis Blomefield's detailed account in his History of Norwich (published in parts during 1741 and 1742) was based on Neville but supplemented with material from other sources such as the works of Raphael Holinshed, Peter Heylin and Thomas Fuller, together with various local records. 'Blomefield allowed himself sufficient impartiality to be able to set out, without comment, the grievances of those taking part, but heaped abuse on them for going further than their original intentions'.

It was only in the 19th century that more sympathetic portrayals of the rebellion appeared in print and started the process that saw Kett transformed from traitor to folk hero. An anonymous work of 1843 was critical of Neville's account of the rebellion, and in 1859 clergyman Frederic Russell, who had unearthed new material in archives for his account of the rebellion, concluded that "though Kett is commonly considered a rebel, yet the cause he advocated is so just, that one cannot but feel he deserved a better name and a better fate".

In 1948, Alderman Fred Henderson, a former mayor of Norwich who had been imprisoned in the castle for his part in the food riots of 1885, proposed a memorial to Kett. Originally hoping for a statue, he settled for a plaque on the walls of Norwich Castle engraved with his words and unveiled in 1949, 400 years after the rebellion. In the 21st century the death of Kett is still remembered by the people of Norwich. On 7 December 2011, the anniversary of his death, a memorial march by members of Norwich Occupy and Norwich Green Party took place and a wreath was laid by the gates of Norwich Castle.

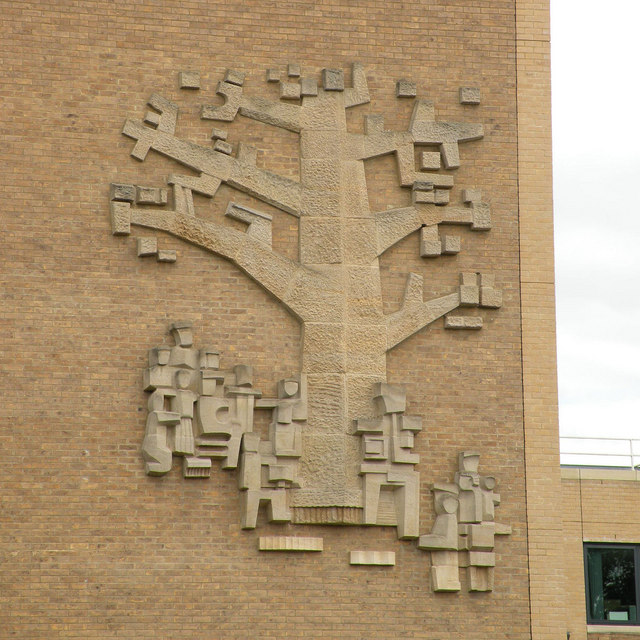
Kett's Oak or the Oak of Reformation on Kett House, an office block in Station Road, Cambridge; Willi Soukop, sculptor

After the rebellion the lands of Kett and his brother William were forfeited, although some of them were later restored to one of his sons. In the longer term the Kett family do not seem to have suffered from their association with the rebellion, but to have prospered in various parts of Norfolk.

The rebellion is remembered in the names of schools, streets, pubs and a walking route in the Norwich and Wymondham area, including the Robert Kett Junior School in Wymondham, Dussindale Primary School in Norwich, the Robert Kett pub in Wymondham, Kett House residence at the University of East Anglia, and Kett's Tavern in Norwich, and in a folk band, Lewis Garland and Kett's Rebellion, and a beer, Kett's Rebellion, by Woodforde's Brewery in Norwich.

Kett's rebellion has featured in novels, including Frederick H. Moore's Mistress Haselwode: A tale of the Reformation Oak (1876), F. C. Tansley's For Kett and Countryside (1910), Jack Lindsay's The Great Oak. A Story of 1549 (1957), Sylvia Haymon's children's story The Loyal Traitor (1965), Margaret Callow's A Rebellious Oak (2012), and C. J. Sansom's Tombland. (2018). Sansom includes a lengthy historical essay on sources used. The rebellion has also been featured in plays, including George Colman Green's Kett the Tanner (1909); and poetry, including Keith Chandler's collection Kett's Rebellion and Other Poems (1982). In 1988 British composer Malcolm Arnold produced the Robert Kett Overture (Opus 141), inspired by the rebellion.

== Sources ==
- Beer, B.L. (1982). Rebellion and Riot: Popular Disorder in England during the Reign of Edward VI. Kent, Ohio: Kent State University Press. ISBN 0873382692.
- Carter, Anne (1984). "The site of Dussindale battle site, Kett's defeat 1549". Norfolk Archaeology. 39 (1). Norfolk & Norwich Archaeological Society: 54–62. doi:10.5284/1078208. "Dussindale would have followed the course of Green Lane"
- Cornwall, Julian (2021). Revolt of the Peasantry 1549. London: Taylor & Francis. ISBN 978-10004-2-446-1.
- Davies, C. S. L. (December 1966). "Slavery and Protector Somerset; the Vagrancy Act of 1547". The Economic History Review. 19 (3): 533. doi:10.1111/j.1468-0289.1966.tb00987.x.
- Groves, R. 1947 Rebel's Oak: the story of the great rebellion of 1549. London: Red Flag Fellowship
- Hoare, A. 2002 An unlikely rebel: Robert Kett and the Norfolk Rising, 1549. Wymondham: Wymondham Heritage Society
- Hodgkins, Alexander (2015). "Reconstructing Rebellion: Digital Terrain Analysis of the Battle of Dussindale (1549)". Internet Archaeology (38). Council for British Archaeology. doi:10.11141/ia.38.3. ISSN 1363-5387.
- Land, Stephen K. (1977). Kett's Rebellion: The Norfolk Rising of 1549. Ipswich: Boydell Press. ISBN 978-0-85115-084-0.
- Lockyer, Roger (2014). Tudor and Stuart Britain: 1485-1714 (3rd ed.). Abingdon, England: Taylor and Francis. ISBN 978-0-582-77188-8.
- MacCulloch, Diarmaid (8 January 1979). "Kett's Rebellion in Context". Past & Present (1): 36–59. doi:10.1093/past/84.1.36. ISSN 0031-2746.
- —— (1988). "Bondmen under the Tudors". Law and Government Under the Tudors: Essays Presented to Sir Geoffrey Elton. Cambridge University Press: 99. doi:10.1017/cbo9780511560491.007.
- Meyer, Gerald J. (2011). The Tudors: the complete story of England's most notorious dynasty. New York: Bantam Books. p. 249. ISBN 978-0385340779.
- Rodgers, Christopher; et al. (2023). English urban commons : the past, present and future of green spaces. New York: Routledge. ISBN 9781032069180.
- Russell, Frederic William (1859). Kett's Rebellion in Norfolk: Being a History of the Great Civil Commotion that Occurred at the Time of the Reformation, in the Reign of Edward VI. London: Longmans. OCLC 1047475473.
- Stoker, David (2004). "Francis Blomefield as a historian of Norwich". Norfolk Archaeology. LIV (3): 387–405, 393. doi:10.5284/1077191.
- Whyte, Nicola (2018). "Remembering Mousehold Heath". In Griffin, Carl; McDonagh, Briony (eds.). Remembering Protest in Britain since 1500: Memory, Materiality and the Landscape. Cham, Switzerland: Springer International Publishing : Imprint: Palgrave Macmillan. ISBN 9783319742434.
- Wood, Andy (2002). Riot, rebellion and popular politics in early modern England. Social history in perspective. Houndmills, Basingstoke, Hampshire: Palgrave. ISBN 978-0-333-63761-6.
- —— (2007). The 1549 rebellions and the making of early modern England. Cambridge: Cambridge University Press. ISBN 978-0-521-83206-9.
- Wyler, S. 2009 A history of community asset ownership. London: Development Trusts Association
