= The Loyal Traitor =

1965 novel by Sylvia Haymon

- First edition
- Author: Sylvia Haymon
- Illustrator: Derek Collard
- Language: English
- Genre: Children's literature, Fiction
- Publisher: Chatto & Windus
- Publication date: 1965
- Publication place: United Kingdom
- Media type: Print with linocut illustrations (Hardcover)

The Loyal Traitor is a children's book written in 1965 by Sylvia Haymon and illustrated by Derek Collard. The story is set during the reign of King Edward VI and centered on the adventures of fictional character Tom Redman. This poor country boy from Wymondham, bears witnesses to the anti-enclosure uprisings and subsequent public execution of Robert Kett.
