= Cow Tower, Norwich =

Medieval artillery tower in Norwich, England

Cow Tower
- Norwich, Norfolk
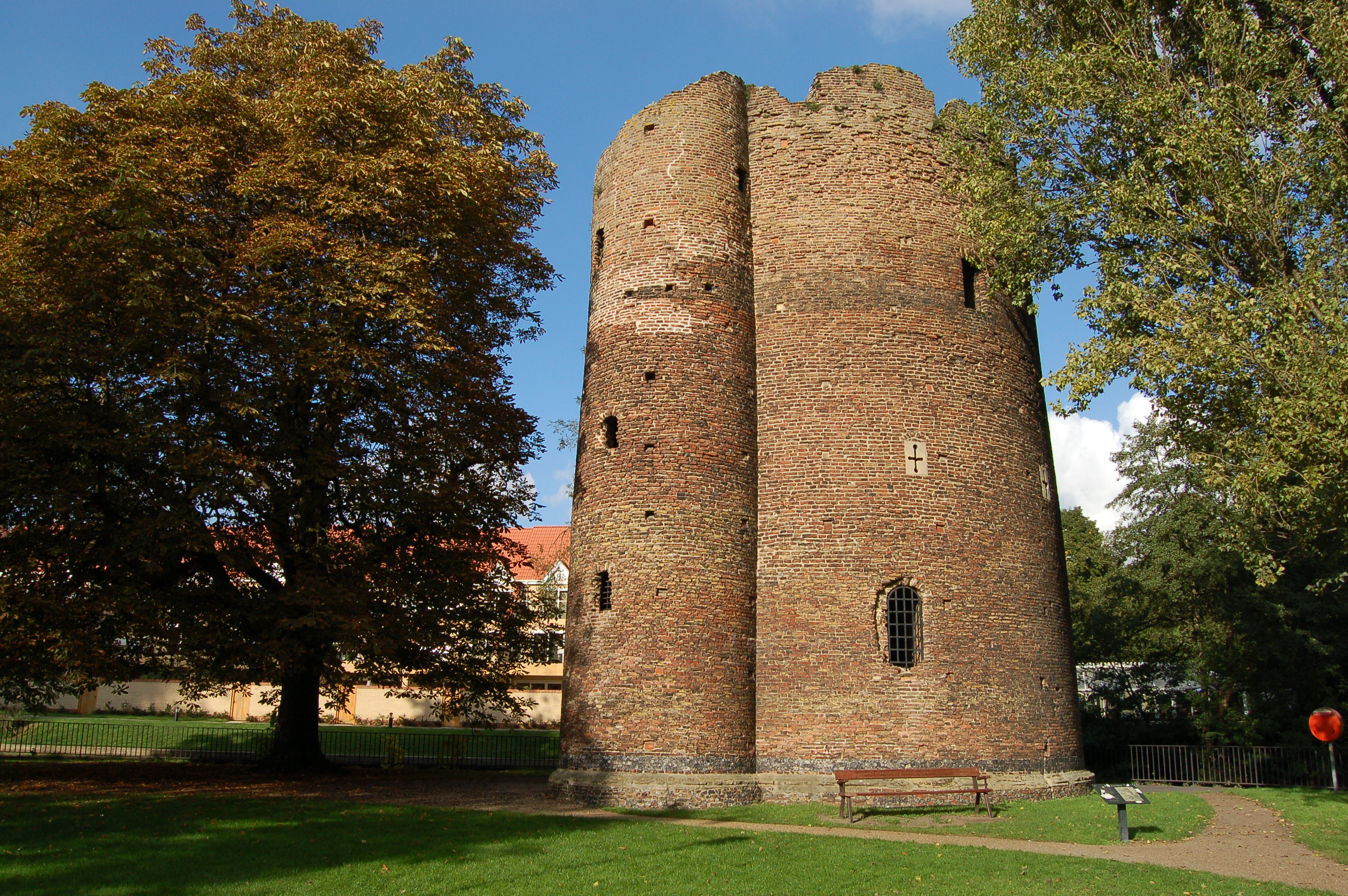
- Cow Tower, showing the main tower and the stairwell turret (left)

Site information
- Type: Artillery tower
- Controlled by: English Heritage and Norwich City Council

Location
- Location within Norfolk
- Coordinates: 52.63419°N 1.30827°E

Site history
- Built: 1398–1399
- Materials: Flint and brick
- Events: Kett's Rebellion

The Cow Tower is an artillery tower by the River Wensum in Norwich, Norfolk, England. Built between 1398 and 1399 by the city authorities in response to the threat from France and indigenous English rebels, the tower was intended to defend the north-eastern approach to Norwich with hand cannons and bombards. It stood apart from the main city walls, close to the river where its height would have allowed it to fire onto the higher ground opposite the city. The tower was designed to hold a garrison when required and was well furnished, probably using different floors for dining and sleeping.

It was maintained throughout the 15th century, and played a role in Kett's Rebellion of 1549, when the rebels attacked Norwich, deploying artillery and damaging the tower's parapets. Repairs to the tower's walls in the late 19th century inadvertently caused long-term damage, and in 1953 it was taken into the guardianship of the Ministry of Works, who stabilised its condition in a five-year conservation project. In the 21st century, Cow Tower is managed by English Heritage and Norwich City Council; the tower is now only a shell, however, as the floors and the roof of the building have been lost.

The circular tower is 11.2 metres (37 ft) across, 14.6 metres (48 ft) high and divided into three storeys. Its walls are 1.8 metres (5 ft 11 in) thick at the base, with a core of flint stone, faced on the inside and outside with brick; the archaeologist T. P. Smith considers it to feature some "of the finest medieval brickwork" in England. The walls have gunports for the smaller pieces of artillery and the roof would have supported the heavier bombards, with wide embrasures giving the weapons adequate firing space. The Cow Tower was specially designed to support the use of gunpowder artillery, making it a very rare structure in England for this period: the only close equivalents are God's House Tower in Southampton, and the West Gate at Canterbury.

== History ==
=== 14th century ===
Cow Tower is an artillery tower that was built in the city of Norwich, Norfolk, England, between 1398 and 1399. Norwich was a prosperous city in the late 14th century, with a population of around 5,000 involved in key medieval industries and forming a centre for international trade. Between 1297 and 1350 the city had erected a circuit of defensive stone walls and ditches, both to impress upon outsiders the status of Norwich as a great city, and also to defend against invasion or civil disorder.

Fears grew about the threat of French raids across England from the 1380s onward. The citizens of Norwich were particularly concerned about the potential of a French raid on the city, drawing parallels between the position of Norwich and the experience of Southampton, another trading city that had been devastated by a French attack in 1338. This threat, combined with the recent events of the Peasant Revolt of 1381 when the rebels had looted the city, encouraged the local government to improve the city's defences.

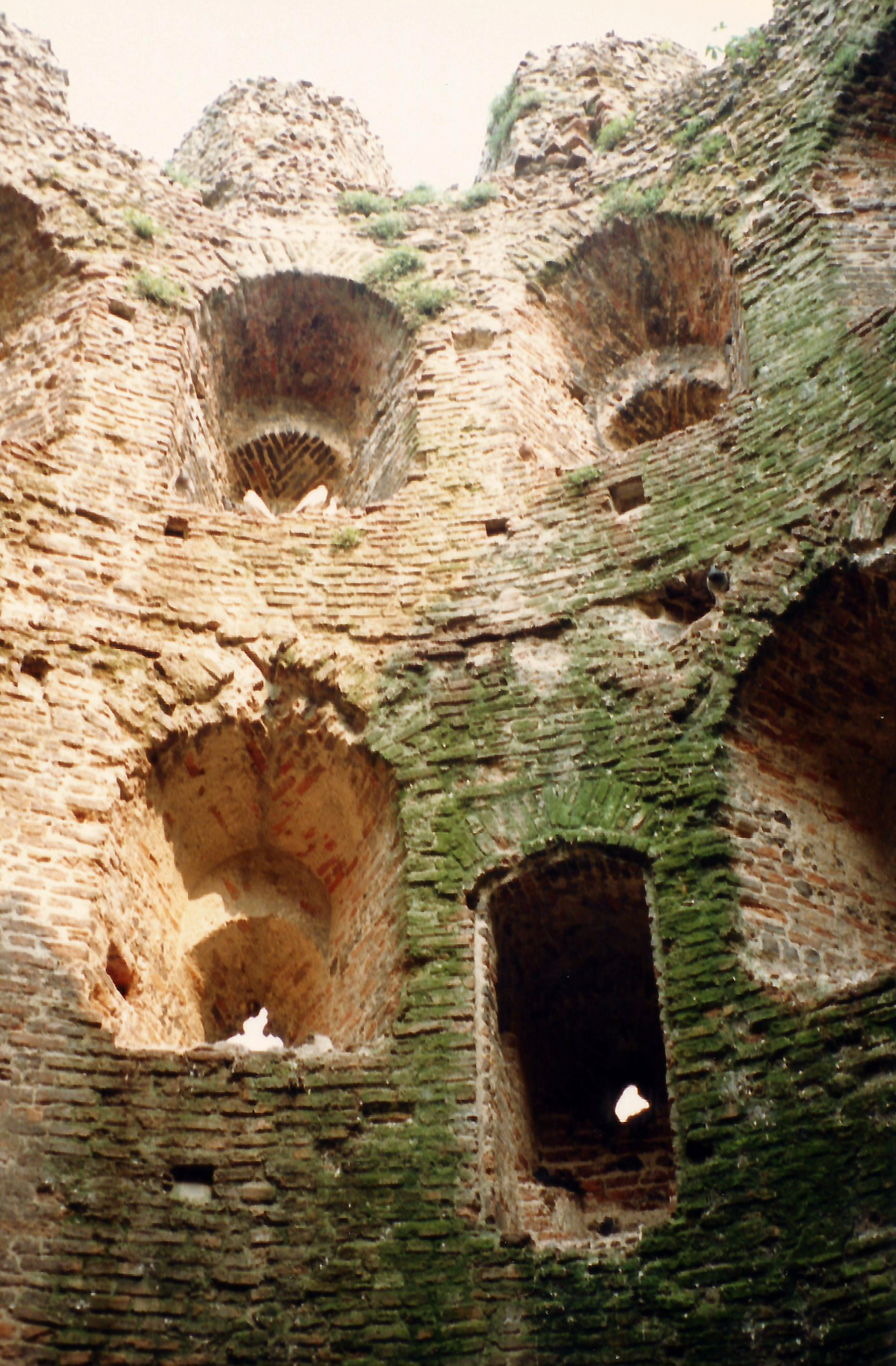
The interior of the tower, showing the various gunports

Gunpowder weapons had begun to be introduced into England in the early 14th century, initially being used as offensive siege weapons but rapidly being adapted for defensive purposes during the 1360s. (Note: Early gunpowder artillery had only a limited range and the stone cannonballs that were initially used were relatively ineffective when fired at stone walls. As a result, gunpowder artillery proved most useful for defence, particularly when directed against infantry assaults or used to target the crews of enemy siege engines.) Although they were expensive, by the 1380s their potential value in defending castles and city walls was well understood and specialised facilities had begun to be built. Norwich had acquired gunpowder weapons and a team of gunners by 1355, and by 1385 had fifty gunpowder pieces for use along its city walls. Typically, these would have been small guns called hand cannons, rather than the heavier pieces termed bombards.

The tower was built on one of the approaches to Norwich in a bend in the River Wensum, in a meadow called Cowholme, from where it acquired its current name. (Note: The meadow of Cowholme takes its name from the older word Couholm, comprising cou, "cow", and holm, a Scandinavian word for "water meadow".) When first built, however, it was initially called the Dungeon, and then the "tower in the Hospital meadows", as the surrounding land was part of the St Giles Hospital. It was intended to function as a specialised artillery tower, housing gunpowder weaponry capable of suppressing attackers on the far side of the river. The Wensum was quite narrow at this point, however, and the tower's defences would have been of relatively limited value if the enemy successfully crossed over.

There are fragmentary historical references to an earlier tower in the area, responsible for collecting tolls and acting as a prison, but it is unclear if this was on the same site as the Cow Tower, or refers to a different tower in the area. The Cow Tower was one of several fortifications along this stretch of the river, with the gatehouse of Bishop Bridge lying just to the south, followed by two boom towers that controlled access to the waterway a further 1 kilometre (0.62 mi) down-river, and with another tower positioned 300 metres (980 ft) up-river to the north. Although the Cow Tower was not directly part of the city walls, a protective timber palisade linked the tower with the line of the city wall to the north-west, and ran south to meet Bishop Bridge.

The city's accounts show the details of the payments for the construction of the tower between 1398 and 1399, including charges for 36,850 bricks, stone, sand, lime, a hoist and various equipment. At least 170 cartloads of stone are mentioned, and the bricks may have been brought to the site along the river by boat, while some of the timber was brought from Great Yarmouth. The total cost of the building from these records, including labour, came to around £36. (Note: It is impossible to accurately compare medieval and modern sums of money.) The number of bricks used in the tower, however, was probably twice the listed number purchased, and the city may therefore already have stockpiled some bricks on the location before the build.

=== 15th–16th centuries ===
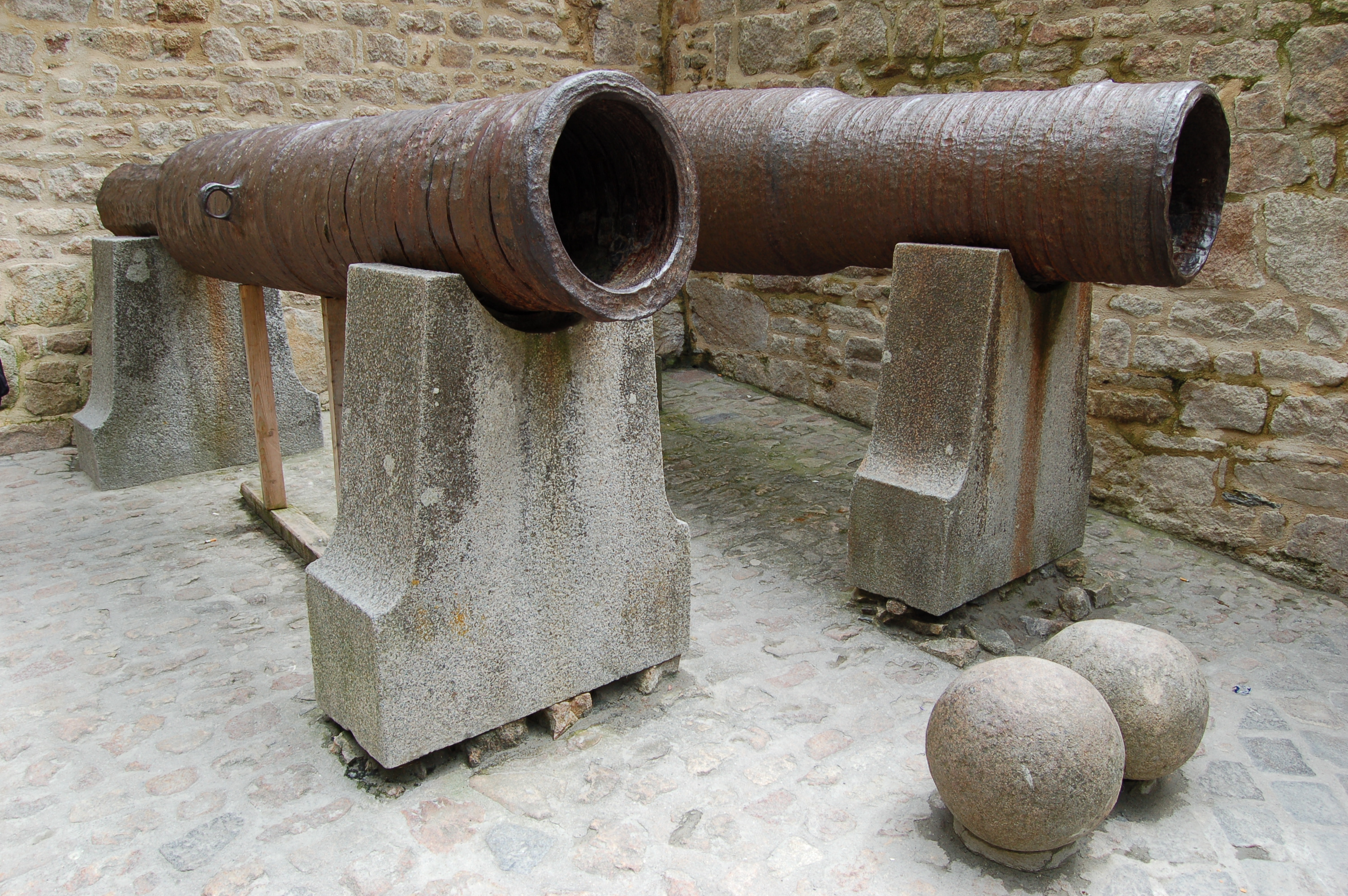
Examples of English bombards and stone cannonballs from the early 15th century

Cow Tower formed part of the city defences during the 15th century, with the Crown occasionally issuing instructions that it should be repaired. In 1450 St Giles Hospital formally transferred any rights they had to the tower and the immediately surrounding land to the city. The population of Norwich grew significantly from 1500 onwards and the city continued to maintain the urban defences; like other towers and gatehouses belonging to the city, however, by this period the Cow Tower was probably leased out to a merchant or craftsman when not in military use.

In 1549, Robert Kett led an uprising in Norfolk; marching on Norwich, his army camped on the north-east side of the river, overlooking Cow Tower. Two rebel attacks were then made across the river into the Hospital meadows, in an attempt to take Bishop Bridge, which would have given them access to the city. Kett had brought artillery, which he turned on the Cow Tower, damaging the latter's parapets. The rebellion failed, and the tower does not seem to have required extensive repairs.

=== 17th–21st centuries ===
Most of Norwich's city walls, and all of the gatehouses, were demolished in the late 18th and 19th century as the city industrialised, but the Cow Tower avoided destruction. The tower was now owned by the Trustees of the Great Hospital, who carried out repairs to the structure in the late 19th century, and in 1904, the British Army considered repairing the tower for use as an ammunition depot. The repairs in the 19th century had used modern concrete when patching the walls, and this, combined with erosion from the river, soon caused extensive damage: wide splits formed up and down the tower along its northern side.

The Ministry of Works took the tower into its guardianship in 1953 to address the problems, and promptly undertook an extensive sequence of repairs that lasted until 1958. No archaeological investigation was carried out during these works, however, and a full architectural survey of the building was only carried out between 1985 and 1986, by the Historic Buildings and Monuments Commission. In the 21st century, Cow Tower is managed by English Heritage and Norwich City Council; the tower is now only a shell, however, as the floors and the roof have been lost. The tower is protected under UK law as a scheduled monument.

== Architecture ==
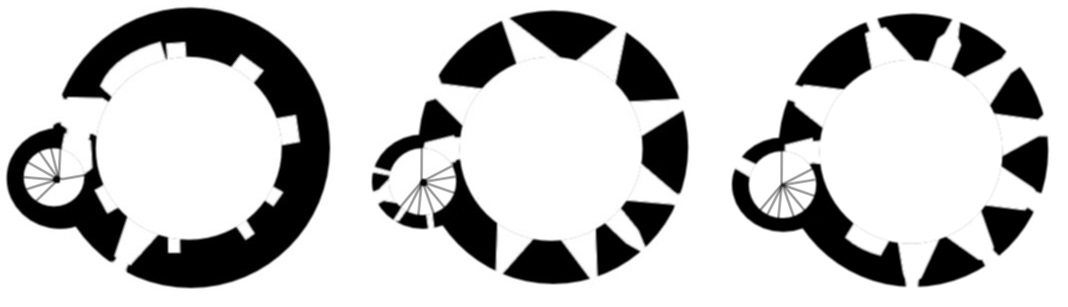
Plan of the tower: (left to right) ground floor, first floor, second floor

Cow Tower is a three-story circular building with a protruding turret, the main building being 11.2 metres (37 ft) across and 14.6 metres (48 ft) tall, tapering towards the top. Its walls, 1.8 metres (5 ft 11 in) thick at the base, are made of a core of flint stone, faced on the inside and outside with brick, and various putlog holes can still be seen in the walls. The turret, which contained a spiral staircase, would originally have been higher than the parapets, forming a look-out position. The walls rest on a stone plinth and several layers of mortared flint.

The bricks were probably made at the St Benet's Abbey in Norfolk, with the stone coming from chalk pits near Norwich's southern Conesford Gates. The brickwork, particularly on the stairwell, is particularly well executed, and archaeologist T. P. Smith considers the tower to feature some "of the finest medieval brickwork" in England. It is the earliest known use of brick in an external load-capacity in Norwich. The use of brick in this sort of fortification was both prestigious and practical, as brick absorbed the impact of artillery fire better than stone. The river bends around about 1 metre (3 ft 3 in) from the bottom of the tower, and its base may have been underpinned with timber piles during its original construction.

The Cow Tower was deliberately designed to house gunpowder artillery when it was first built, making it a very rare form of defensive structure for its time: the only equivalents in England are God's House Tower in Southampton, and the West Gate at Canterbury. The archaeologists Oliver Creighton and Robert Higham go so far as to consider the building to be unique within Britain, as God's House was an extension of an existing building, and the West Gate part of the city's walled circuit. The concept of an isolated artillery tower was more common in France, where they were used as temporary and permanent defensive features during the Hundred Years War between the English and the French kings.

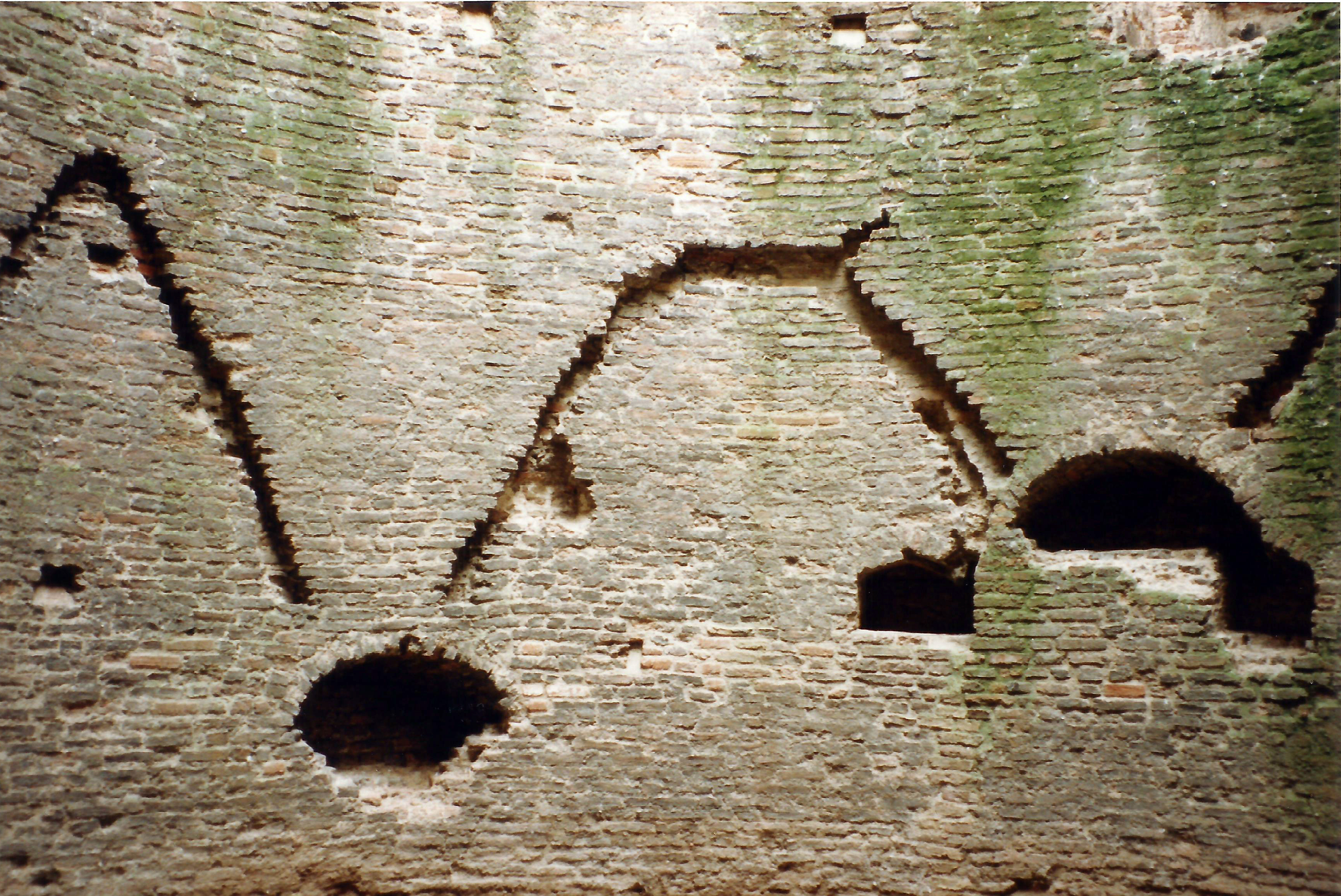
Chasing and sockets in the walls of the ground floor

The quatrefoil gunports in the lower levels could have been used for both hand cannons and crossbows, with overlapping fields of fire. The roof was reinforced with large timber joints, and could have supported heavier bombards, possibly on wheeled carriages; the tower's considerable height would have allowed the bombards to reach across the river onto the higher ground overlooking the city. Getting the bombards onto the roof may have required them to be hoisted up on a winch; one such hoist formed part of the accounts for the tower's construction in 1398 and 1399.

The tower's gun installations were intended to be used to deal with an external threat approaching from the far side of the river. The parapet of the roof was crenellated with nine wide embrasures, and the embrasures facing out across the river were constructed flush with the floor of the roof, giving the bombards plenty of room to fire. The embrasures facing away from the river, however, had sloping cills rather than open positions, and the windows in the tower facing towards the city were rectangular and relatively unprotected. The entrance to the tower itself was not fortified, as the tower was not expected to be defended from a direct attack by land.

The tower was designed to be able to maintain a garrison when required and was well furnished. The ground floor and second floor had fireplaces, with the first and second floors also having garderobes. The ground floor may have formed a dining area, with the floors above being used for military purposes and sleeping accommodation. The walls of the ground floor have chasing and sockets cut into them. It is unclear what these were: theories include that they contained timbers to support brickwork that in turn supported the first floor; that they were held timbers that supported the joists of the first floor; or they are the remains of an ammunition store, retrofitted in the tower in the 16th century.

== See also ==
- List of town walls in England and Wales

== Bibliography ==
- Ayers, Brian S. (1994). English Heritage Book of Norwich. London, UK: English Heritage. ISBN 978-0-7134-7568-5.
- Ayers, Brian S. (2004). "The Urban Landscape". In Rawcliffe, Carol; Wilson, Richard (eds.). Medieval Norwich. London, UK: Hambledon and London. pp. 1–28. ISBN 978-1-85285-546-8.
- Ayers, Brian S.; Smith, Robert; Tillyard, Margot; Smith, T. P. (1988). "The Cow Tower, Norwich: A Detailed Survey and Partial Reinterpretation". Medieval Archaeology. 32: 184–207. doi:10.1080/00766097.1988.11735508.
- Creighton, Oliver Hamilton; Higham, Robert (2005). Medieval Town Walls: An Archaeology and Social History of Urban Defence. Stroud, UK: Tempus. ISBN 978-0-7524-1445-4.
- Dunn, Alastair (2002). The Great Rising of 1381: The Peasants' Revolt and England's Failed Revolution. Stroud, UK: Tempus. ISBN 978-0-7524-2323-4.
- King, D. J. (1991). The Castle in England and Wales: An Interpretative History. London, UK: Routledge. ISBN 0-415-00350-4.
- Maddern, Philippa (2004). "Order and Disorder". In Rawcliffe, Carol; Wilson, Richard (eds.). Medieval Norwich. London, UK: Hambledon and London. pp. 189–212. ISBN 978-1-85285-546-8.
- Rutledge, Elizabeth (2004). "Norwich Before the Black Death". In Rawcliffe, Carol; Wilson, Richard (eds.). Medieval Norwich. London, UK: Hambledon and London. pp. 157–158. ISBN 978-1-85285-546-8.
- Saunders, A. D. (1985). "The Cow Tower, Norwich: An East Anglian Bastille?". Medieval Archaeology. 29: 109–119. doi:10.1080/00766097.1985.11735467.
- Turner, Hilary L. (1971). Town Defences in England and Wales: An Architectural and Documentary Study, AD 900–1500. London, UK: John Baker. ISBN 0-212-98384-9.
