= Andrea Centurione Pietrasanta =

Doge of the Republic of Genoa

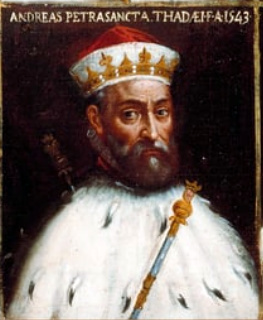

53rd Doge of the Republic of Genoa
- In office 4 January 1543 – 4 January 1545
- Preceded by: Leonardo Cattaneo della Volta
- Succeeded by: Giovanni Battista De Fornari

Personal details
- Born: 1471 Genoa, Republic of Genoa
- Died: 1546 (aged 74–75) Genoa, Republic of Genoa

Andrea Centurione Chiariti (1471 in Genoa – 1546 Genoa) was the 53rd Doge of the Republic of Genoa.

After covering several minor figures in public life he was appointed procurator of the Republic from 1537 together with Giovanni Battista Lercari, future doge in the biennium 1563-1565. On 4 January 1543, he succeeded Leonardo Cattaneo della Volta at the head of the dogal power, the fifty-third in the history of the Genoese republic and the eighth after the biennial reform.

Among the most important works in his mandate is certainly the reconstruction of the Genoa lantern during 1543, with funding from the Bank of Saint George, seriously damaged by the bombing of the Genoese insurgents against the French invasion of 1513 during the dogate of Ottaviano Fregoso.

His office ended on 4 January 1545 with the appointment of his successor Giovanni Battista De Fornari. He died in Genoa shortly after the dogate, in the course of 1546. His body was buried in the church of Sant'Agostino.

== See also ==
- Doge of Genoa
- Republic of Genoa
