= Leonardo Cattaneo della Volta =

Doge of the Republic of Genoa

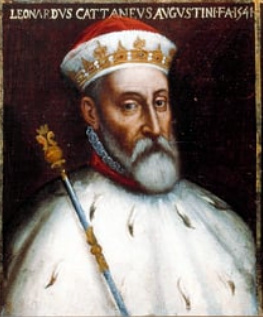

52nd Doge of the Republic of Genoa
- In office 4 January 1541 – 4 January 1543
- Preceded by: Giannandrea Giustiniani Longo
- Succeeded by: Andrea Centurione Pietrasanta

Personal details
- Born: 1487 Genoa, Republic of Genoa
- Died: 1572 (aged 84–85) Genoa, Republic of Genoa

Leonardo Cattaneo della Volta (1487 – 1572) was the 52nd Doge of the Republic of Genoa.

== Biography ==
Son of Angelo Cattaneo della Volta and Maria Cattaneo di Quilico, he was born in Genoa around 1487.

His noble and needy figure is remembered in the historical records of the Genoese characters for having founded, in a period of maximum famine, the "Officio dei Poveri", made up of a magistrate together with eight Genoese citizens who, together with the parallel construction of numerous public barns, managed to coordinate and therefore provide support to about four thousand needy inhabitants.

The first institutional position that Leonardo Cattaneo della Volta held was that of procurator of the Republic from 1533. In 1534, with the fresh appointment of governor, he was designated by the doge Battista Lomellini to guide the overseas territory of Corsica. Returning to Genoa in 1535 after his tenure as governor, a position he held for about two years, he was appointed governor of the Republic itself. It was at this stage that, during the establishment of Cristoforo Grimaldi Rosso, he suggested the institution and participated in the office.

According to various historical opinions, it was precisely his activism in managing the emergency of famine which, in fact, led him to the customs elections of 1541 as a personality designated to hold the highest office in the state. With 268 favourable votes, and among the acclamation of the Genoese people, Leonardo Cattaneo della Volta was elected on 4 January, seventh doge of Genoa, with a two-year office, and fifty-second in republican history.

== Dogate and later years ==
In his mandate, he promoted the construction of the walls of the gates of the republic, works in the Grimaldina tower of the Doge's Palace and the Genoese port, providing a cost of about 500 gold shields. However, he also had to deal with a new famine that afflicted Genoa and the rest of Italy in 1541. To find new agricultural resources, the Genoese state asked for help both from the Kingdom of Sicily and from the fields of Lombardy, but precisely the spread of the event in other Italian states, and therefore with similar situations of "food demand", they forced the doge to the Kingdom of France. The immediate French response in the supply of resources was followed by official thanks from Doge Cattaneo della Volta by the two ambassadors of the Republic to the King of France.

At the end of his dogal biennium, in 1543, he returned to live in his sumptuous palace. In 1547, the famous "Congiura dei Fieschi " broke out against the power of the Republic and was commissioned by the doge Benedetto Gentile Pevere to manage the revolt together with Nicolò de Franchi. Appointed general commissioner, he actively participated, with the help of the already doge Cristoforo Grimaldi Rosso, in the repression of the Fieschi at the barricaded castle of Montoggio in the upper Scrivia valley.

In 1548, always together with Grimaldi Rosso, he participated in the reconstruction of the dock of the port of Savona. He died in Genoa in 1572, where he found burial in the Church of San Torpete.

== See also ==
- Doge of Genoa
- Republic of Genoa
- Corsica
- Doge's Palace, Genoa
