= Gaspare Grimaldi Bracelli =

Doge of the Republic of Genoa

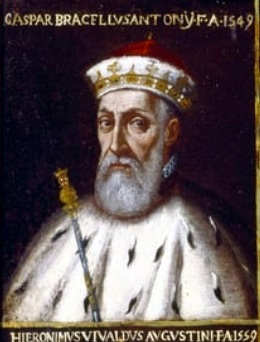

56th Doge of the Republic of Genoa
- In office 4 January 1549 – 4 January 1551
- Preceded by: Benedetto Gentile Pevere
- Succeeded by: Luca Spinola

Personal details
- Born: 1477 Genoa, Republic of Genoa
- Died: 4 July 1552 (aged 74–75) Genoa, Republic of Genoa

Gaspare Grimaldi Bracelli (Genoa, 1477 - Genoa, 4 July 1552) was the 56th Doge of the Republic of Genoa.

== Biography ==
Grimaldi Bracelli was elected to the dogal title on 4 January 1549, the eleventh in biennial succession and the fifty-sixth in republican history, a position he held until 4 January 1551. During his dogate he had to face various internal conspiracies, above all to orient the current Spanish political influences of Genoa towards France, among which the one led by the Marquis Giulio Cibo, immediately foiled.

Subsequently stronger and more dangerous for the stability of the state was instead the popular revolt of some citizens, fed by five main Genoese nobles and whose "political leader" was recognized in the person of Domenico Imperiale Gioiardo. The court punished the latter for a fine of 1000 gold scudo, while the other nobles were punished with a monetary punishment of 200 gold scudo, the cancellation of any concession and noble privilege and the removal from the lands of the Republic and its overseas territories for two years.

As doge he also signed the arrest warrant for Giovanni Battista De Fornari, former doge, and his relatives, following the accusations that saw the latter as a traitor to the Republic. In his mandate, in accordance with Pope Julius III, the institution of the Magistrate of the Nuns was obtained.

He died in Genoa on 4 July 1552 and found a burial in the church of San Francesco di Castelletto.

== See also ==
- Republic of Genoa
- Doge of Genoa
- House of Grimaldi
