= Revolt of the Pitauds =

French peasant riots over salt taxes from 1541 to 1549

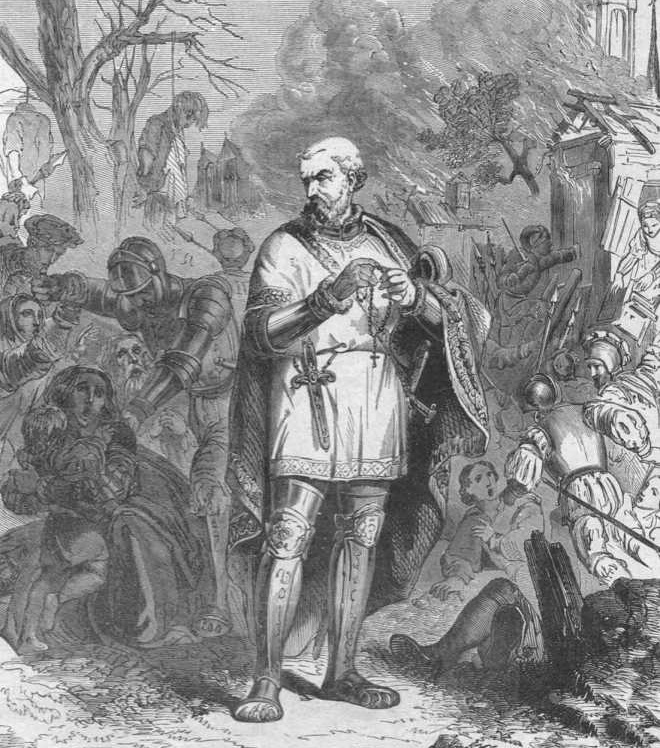
Suppression of the revolt of the Pitauds, by Anne of Montmorency

The revolt of the pitauds (French: jacquerie des Pitauds, révolte des Pitauds) was a French peasants' revolt in the mid-16th century.

The revolt was sparked by the 1541 decree of Châtellerault, which extended a salt tax to Angoumois and Saintonge (from a desire for royal centralisation). It was made compulsory to purchase salt from the salt loft (taxed salt). “Gabelle” officers took charge of punishing the unlawful trading of salt. But these were salt pan areas where the salt was freely traded. Salt smuggling (faux-saunage) spread rapidly, especially after the Marennes and La Rochelle revolts in 1542, and the repression by the salt riders is out of the population acceptance.

In 1548, riots break out in Angoumois and Saintonge demanding the release of the smugglers (faux-sauniers). The de Pitauds revolt grew to 20,000 members, led by a lord and joined by priests. Castles were plundered and salt-tax collectors killed. The revolt spread to Bordeaux where 20 salt tax collectors were killed, including the lieutenant governor, on 21 August 1548.

King Henry II blockaded Bordeaux and launched his repression. Bordeaux lost its privileges. It was disarmed, paid a fine, saw its parliament suspended, and 140 people were sentenced to death. The repression spread to the countryside where the leaders were hanged: neither priests nor gentlemen were spared.

The salt-tax was finally abolished in these provinces in June 1549, the provinces became redeemed countries, and the King issued a general amnesty.
