= Miyoshi Masanaga =

Daimyo and samurai (1508–1549)

Miyoshi Masanaga (三好 政長; 1508 – July 18, 1549) was a Japanese samurai of the Sengoku period, a member of the Miyoshi clan who served as Hosokawa Harumoto. He is remembered as the cousin of Miyoshi Nagayoshi. Masanaga had very strong relations with the Ikeda clan, as Ikeda Nagamasa was his son-in-law. Due to this strong relation between the families, Chokei considered him a threat. After 1548, Masanaga engaged in a major battle against his cousin, which ended in Chokei's victory. Masanaga's whereabouts after this battle are unknown.
