= Benedetto Gentile Pevere =

Doge of the Republic of Genoa

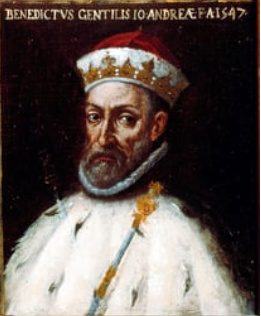

55th Doge of the Republic of Genoa
- In office January 4, 1547 – January 4, 1549
- Preceded by: Giovanni Battista De Fornari
- Succeeded by: Gaspare Grimaldi Bracelli

Personal details
- Born: 1490 Genoa, Republic of Genoa
- Died: 1555 (aged 64–65) Genoa, Republic of Genoa

Benedetto Gentile Pevere (Genoa, 1490 - Genoa, 1555) was the 55th Doge of the Republic of Genoa.

== Biography ==
Son of Mariettina Grimaldi and Giovanni Gentile Pevere, lord of Cap Corse in Corsica, he was presumably born in Genoa around 1490.

Unlike his predecessors, the early stages of Benedetto Gentile Pevere were not linked to Genoese political life, but to the papal court in Rome where he practiced the profession of chamber cleric in various offices of the Holy See. After leaving Rome he moved back to the capital of the Genoese republic where he married Benedictine Fieschi, daughter of Paride, from whom he had a son, Francesco, who died at a young age drowning in an exceptional flood of the Polcevera stream.

His dogal election, on January 4, 1547, occurred at a crucial stage for Genoa and its stave. In the same days, in fact, the famous conspiracy of Gianluigi Fieschi took place against the power of the Dorias and his greatest exponent the admiral Andrea Doria. The chronicles of the annals say that it was Doria himself who supported the appointment of Benedetto Gentile Pevere, despite the close relationship of the wife with the Fieschi family could have caused perplexity or incompatibility. The choice on the newly elected doge, the tenth with a two-year term and the fifty-fifth in republican history, however, was not accidental since in other circumstances the political preferences of Admiral Doria fell on personalities considered peaceful and above all malleable in the event of a crisis.

He ended his dogal office on January 4, 1549. He presumably died in Genoa in 1555 where he was buried in the church of San Benigno.

== See also ==
- Doge of Genoa
- Republic of Genoa
