= Giovanni Battista De Fornari =

Doge of the Republic of Genoa from 1545 to 1547

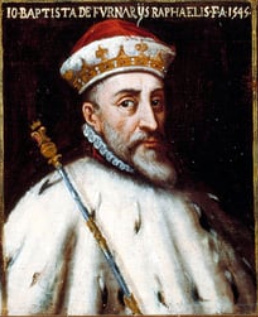

54th Doge of the Republic of Genoa
- In office January 4, 1545 – January 4, 1547
- Preceded by: Andrea Centurione Pietrasanta
- Succeeded by: Benedetto Gentile Pevere

Personal details
- Born: 1484 Genoa, Republic of Genoa
- Died: Unknown Antwerp, Habsburg Netherlands

Giovanni Battista De Fornari (1484 in Genoa – 16th century, in Antwerp) was the 54th Doge of the Republic of Genoa.

== Biography ==
Giovanni Battista De Fornari began to serve the Republic of Genoa from 1509 as an officer in various institutions and elector in the years 1516, 1518 and 1522. As one of the twelve reformers of the Republic, in 1523, he participated in internal decisions on relations and intentions to be undertaken against the "rebel" Savona: his appeal, with an oration to effect, was in favor of the destruction of the considered "Ligurian Carthage".

In 1534 he was elected from among the major councilors and, in 1540, appointed as one of the Fathers of the Municipality. On January 4, 1545, despite a strong disappointment of the "old" nobility of the Portico of San Luca, he was elected by popular acclaim by the "new" nobility of Nuovi di San Pietro as the ninth doge with a two-year mandate in Genoa, the fifty-fourth in republican history.

During his mandate he reinforced the city port and the riverbed of the Bisagno torrent, but above all he worked to restore the dock of Savona, a city that only twelve years earlier he would have wanted to raze to the ground as a reformer of the Republic for adverse alliances against Genoa. The mandate ended on 4 January 1547, as per the regulations, in conjunction with the famous "Conspiracy of Gianluigi Fieschi ".

After a turbulent time in the history of the republic that led to his arrest, on the charge of treason towards the republic, Giovanni Battista De Fornari left for exile in Antwerp, in present-day Belgium, where he presumably died on an unknown date. He was married to Andrea Ciceri's daughter, Marietta.

== See also ==
- Doge of Genoa
- Republic of Genoa
