= Sylvia Haymon =

British writer

Sylvia (Theresa) Haymon
- Born: 1918; Norwich, Norfolk, England
- Died: 1 December 1995 (aged 76–77)
- Citizenship: British
- Spouses: Mark Haymon
- Writing career
- Pen name: S. T. Haymon; Sylvia T. Haymon
- Notable awards: Crime Writers' Association Silver Dagger Award, 1983, for Ritual Murder

Sylvia Haymon (1918 – 1 December 1995) was a British writer of mystery fiction, autobiography, and other fiction and nonfiction. As an adult, she worked in public relations, broadcasting, journalism, and farming, and published nonfiction that included two childhood memoirs, a historical novel, biographies of Bonnie Prince Charlie and Monmouth, and a history of Norwich, her birthplace. Writing under the pseudonym S. T. Haymon, she became well known for her police procedural series featuring Detective Inspector Ben Jurnet. She won the Crime Writers' Association Silver Dagger Award in 1983 for Ritual Murder.

== Critical reception ==
Writing in The St. James Guide to Crime and Mystery Writers, Carol M. Harper said, "The Detective Inspector Benjamin Jurnet series is one of the more literate, well written mystery series published, a series most highly recommended to those readers who like the British 'cozy' procedural."

Kirkus Reviews called Haymon's second memoir, The Quivering Tree, "great fun". It continues the childhood adventures described in her first memoir, Opposite the Cross Keys. Haymon, who depicts herself as an "unusually clever, frequently petulant, and thoroughly practical young girl". The work "evokes an era when secrets still existed and scandals were bursting to happen—and makes for slyly humorous, very British entertainment."

A Publishers Weekly review of A Beautiful Death praised Haymon's writing: "With her elegant style and talent for exposing the raw nerves of her characters in a few select words, she cuts right to the heart of her sleuth in this powerful story."

Haymon died in 1995. In 1996, the last book in her mystery series, Death of a Hero, was published. Kirkus said of it, "All the elements of the author's unique talent are at work here: offbeat characters probed to the bone; plotting that's bizarre but believable, and lyrical writing by turns introspective, pungent, or poetic. She will be missed."

== Bibliography ==
Crime novels

- Death and the Pregnant Virgin (1980)
- Ritual Murder (1982)
- Stately Homicide (1984)
- Death of a God (1987)
- A Very Particular Murder (1989)
- Death of a Warrior Queen (1991)
- A Beautiful Death (1993)
- Death of a Hero (1996)

Other

- Television and Radio As a Career (nonfiction) (1963)
- The Loyal Traitor: A Story of Kett's Rebellion (novel) (1965)
- Bonnie Prince Charlie (nonfiction), illustrated by Peter Bailey (1969)
- King Monmouth (nonfiction) (1970)
- Norwich (nonfiction), illustrated by Joanna Worth (1973)
- Opposite the Cross Keys: An East Anglian Childhood (autobiography) (1988)
- The Quivering Tree (autobiography) (1990)
