= Robert Kett =

16C English rebel in Norwich

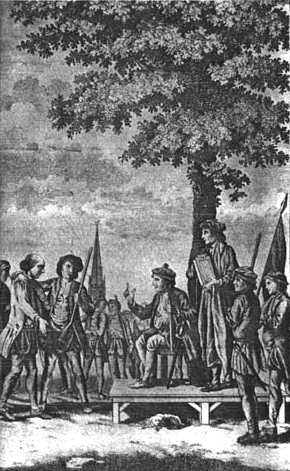
Samuel Wale engraving of Robert Kett beneath the oak of reformation

Robert Kett (c. 1492 – 7 December 1549) was the leader of Kett's Rebellion.

Kett was the fourth son of Thomas Kett, of Forncett, Norfolk and his wife Margery. He is thought to have been a tanner, but he certainly held the manor of Wymondham in Norfolk. With his brother William he led the men of Wymondham in their quarrel with John Flowerdew, the father of Edward Flowerdew. They tore down the enclosure fences Flowerdew had erected on the Hethersett common, and having thus come into prominence, Kett headed the men of Norfolk when they rose in rebellion in 1549 owing to the hardships inflicted by the extensive enclosures of common lands and by the general policy of Edward Seymour, 1st Duke of Somerset, then Lord Protector. A feast held at Wymondham in July 1549 developed into a riot and gave the signal for the outbreak. Leading his followers to Norwich, Kett formed a camp on Mousehold Heath, where he is said to have commanded 16,000 men, introduced a regular system of discipline, administered justice and blockaded the region. The 29 clauses of the Petition survive, and the petition is below. It is notable in reflecting the language of the new religion, in line with the Lord Protector's inclinations and in its carefully diplomatic format of requesting changes. Broadly speaking, the clauses seek:

- To limit the power of the gentry
- To restrain rapid economic change
- To prevent the overuse of communal resources
- To remodel the values of the clergy, echoing Somerset's religious radicalism

1. We pray your grace that where it is enacted for enclosing that it be not hurtful to such as have enclosed saffron grounds for they be greatly chargeable to them, and that from henceforth no man shall enclose any more.
2. We certify your grace that whereas the lords of the manors have been charged with certain free rent, the same lords have sought means to charge the freeholders to pay the same rent, contrary to right.
3. We pray your grace that no lord of no manor shall common upon the common.
4. We pray that priests from henceforth shall purchase no lands neither free nor bond, and the lands that they have in possession may be letten to temporal men, as they were in the first year of the reign of King Henry VII.
5. We pray that all the marshes that are held of the king’s majesty by free rent or of any other, may be at such price as they were in the first year of King Henry VII.
6. We pray that reed ground and meadow ground may be at such price as they were in the first year of King Henry VII.
7. We pray that all bushels within your realm be of one stice, that is to say, to be in measure VIII gallons.
8. We pray that priests or vicars that be not able to preach and set forth the word of God to his parishioners may be thereby put from his benefice, and the parishioners there to choose another or else patron or lord of the town.
9. We pray that the payments of castle ward rent, blanch farm, and office lands, which hath been accustomed to be gathered of the tenements, whereas we suppose the lords ought to pay the same to their bailiffs for their rents gathering, and not the tenants.
10. We pray that no man under the degree of a knight or esquire keep a dove house, except it hath been of an old ancient custom.
11. We pray that all freeholders and copyholders may take the profits of all commons, and there to common, and the lords not to common nor take profits of the same.
12. We pray that no feodary within your shores shall be a counselor to any man in his office making, whereby the king may be truly served, so that a man being of good conscience may be yearly chosen to the same office by the commons of the same shire.
13. We pray your grace to take all liberty of leet your own hands whereby all men may quietly enjoy their commons with all profits.
14. We pray that copyhold land that is unreasonable rented may go as it did in the first year of King Henry VII. And that at the death of a tenant, or of a sale the same lands to be charged with an easy fine as a capon or a reasonable sum of money for a remembrance.
15. We pray that no priest shall hold no other office to any man of honour or worship, but only to be resident upon their benefices, whereby their parishioners may be instructed within the laws of God.
16. We pray that all bond men may be made free, for God made all free with his precious bloodshedding.
17. We pray that Rivers may be free and common to all men for fishing and passage.
18. We pray that no man shall be put by your Feudatory to find any office, unless he holdeth of your grace in chief, or capite above 10 by year.
19. We pray that the poor mariners or fishermen may have the whole profits of their fishings such as porpoises, grampuses, whales, or any great fish so it be not prejudicial to your grace.
20. We pray that every proprietary parson or vicar having a benefice of 10 or more by year, shall either by themselves, or by some other person teach poor men’s children of their parish the book called the catechism and the primer.
21. We pray that it be not lawful to the lords of any manor to purchase lands freely, (i.e. that are freehold), and to let them out again by copy or court roll to their great advancement, and to the undoing of your poor subjects.
22. We pray that no proprietary parson or vicar, in consideration of avoiding trouble and lawsuit between them and their poor parishioners, which they daily do proceed and attempt, shall from henceforth take for the full contents of all the tenths which now they do receive, but 8.
23. We pray that no lord, knight, esquire, nor gentlemen do graze nor feed any bullocks or sheep if he may spend forty pounds a year by his lands but only for the provision of his house.
24. We pray that no man under the degree of [word missing] shall keep any conies upon any freehold or copyhold unless he pale them in so that it shall not be to the commons’ annoyance.
25. We pray that no person of what estate degree or condition he be shall from henceforth sell the awardship of any child, but that the same child if he live to his full age shall be at his own choosing concerning his marriage the King’s wards only except.
26. We pray that no manner of person having a manor of his own, shall be no other lord’s bailiff but only his own.
27. We pray that no lord, knight, or gentleman shall have or take in form any spiritual promotion.
28. We pray your grace to give license and authority by your gracious commission under your great seal to such commissioners as your poor commons have chosen, or to as many of them as your majesty and your counsel shall appoint and think meet, for to redress and reform all such good laws, statues, proclamations and all other your proceedings; which hath been hidden by your Justices of your peace, Sheriff, Feudatories, and other your officers, from your poor commons, since the first year of the reign of your noble grandfather King Henry VII.
29. We pray that those your officers, which have offended your grace and your commons, and [are] so proved by the complaint of your poor commons, do give unto these poor men so assembled 4d. every day so long as they have remained there.

He refused the royal offer of an amnesty on the grounds that innocent and just men had no need of pardon, and on 1 August 1549 attacked and took possession of Norwich. John Dudley, Earl of Warwick, marched against the rebels, and after his offer of pardon had been rejected he forced his way into the city, driving its defenders before him. Then, strengthened by the arrival of some foreign mercenaries, he attacked the main body of the rebels at Dussindale on 27 August. Although Kett's men were faced with a trained soldiery, the battle saw fierce fighting and lasted most of the day: but Kett's men were ultimately defeated and Robert and William Kett were seized and taken to London, where they were condemned to death for treason. On 7 December 1549 Robert was executed at Norwich, and his body was hanged on the top of the castle, while that of William was hanged on the church tower at Wymondham. The Kett line still survives to this day.
