= 1550s =

Decade

The 1550s decade ran from January 1, 1550, to December 31, 1559.

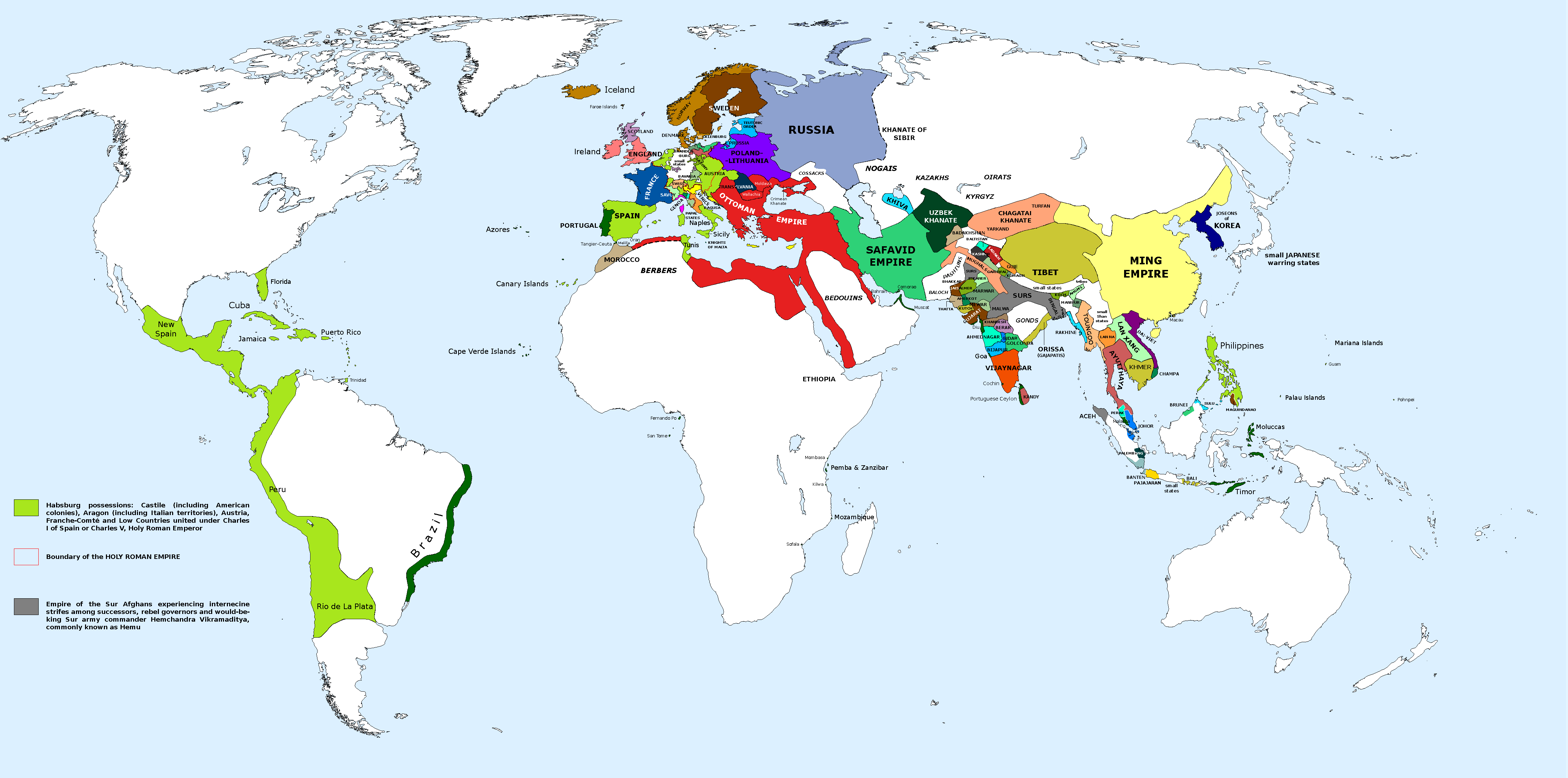
Political map of the world in 1556

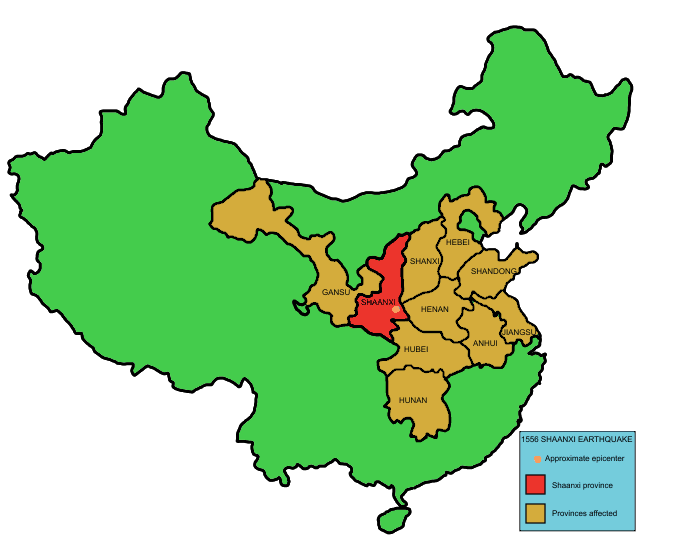
January 23, 1556: Shaanxi earthquake, devastation kills 830,000 in China.

== Events ==
=== 1550 ===
==== January–March ====
- January 6 – Spanish Captain Hernando de Santana founds the city of Valledupar, in modern-day Colombia.
- February 7 – After a 10-week conclave in Rome to elect a new Pope, Giovanni Maria Ciocchi del Monte, Bishop of Palestrina, is selected on the 61st ballot after Reginald Pole of England falls two votes short of winning. Ciocchi del Monte takes the name Pope Julius III and is crowned the next day, succeeding the late Pope Paul III.
- February 25 – (10th day of 2nd month of Tenbun 19) In Oita, Ōita Prefecture, an attack within the Ōtomo clan of Japanese samurai takes place after clan leader Ōtomo Yoshikazu seeks to disinherit his oldest son and to make his third son, Ōtomo Shioichimaru, as his designated successor. Supporters of the oldest son, Ōtomo Yoshishige, invade Yoshikazu's home and kill Shioichimaru and four other family members.
- March 12
  - Arauco War: Battle of Penco – Several hundred Spanish and indigenous troops under the command of Pedro de Valdivia defeat an army of 60,000 Mapuche in modern-day Chile.
  - Acapulco is founded by 30 families sent from Mexico City.
- March 24 – "Rough Wooing": England and France sign the Treaty of Boulogne, by which England withdraws from Boulogne in France and returns territorial gains in Scotland.
- March 29 – Sherborne School in England is refounded by King Edward VI.

==== April–June ====
- April 16 – The Valladolid debate on the rights and treatment of indigenous peoples of the Americas by their Spanish conquerors opens at the Colegio de San Gregorio in Valladolid, Castile.
- April 30 – King Tabinshwehti of Burma is assassinated by two of his bodyguards while he is on a hunting trip. The two swordsmen, sent by Smim Sawhtut, Governor of Sittaung, behead the King, and a civil war begins as major governors rebel against the new Burmese King Bayinnaung.
- May 6 – Italian Protestant Michelangelo Florio, jailed since 1548 before being brought to trial for and sentenced to death for heresy, escapes from prison and is able flee to France.
- May 15 – The vestments controversy is resolved in the Church of England with a compromise on the style of clothing worn by Anglican priests. John Hopper is allowed ordination as the Bishop of Gloucester without being required to wear Anglican vestments, but must not forbid anyone in his bishoporic from wearing the vestments if they wish.
- May 20 – The Spanish Catalan city of Cullera is plundered by the Ottoman Empire General Dragut Reis, and most of its inhabitants are sold into slavery in Algeria.
- June 12 – The city of Helsinki (now in Finland but known as Helsingfors in Sweden at this time) is founded by King Gustav I of Sweden.
- June 28 – Capture of Mahdia (1550): The Spanish Armada arrives in North Africa to begin the process of capturing the fortress of Mahdia (now in Tunisia) from control of the Ottoman Empire.

==== July–September ====
- July 21 – The Society of Jesus (Jesuits) is approved by Pope Julius III.
- July 25 – Capture of Mahdia (1550): Troops commanded by Ottoman General Turgut Reis make a counterattack on the Spanish invaders, led by General Andrea Doria. Both sides sustain heavy losses, and the Spanish succeed in forcing the Ottomans to retreat back inside Mahdia.
- August 5 – The University of Santa Catalina is authorized in Spain by a canonical bull from Pope Julius III.
- September 2 (5th waning of Tawthalin 912 ME) – King Bayinnaung of Burma begins a four-month siege of the former Burmese capital, Toungoo, occupied by the king's rebellious brother Minkhaung.
- September 10 – Spanish troops, commanded by Genoa's General Andrea Doria, capture the Tunisian fortress of Mahdia from the Ottoman Empire after fighting that began on June 28.

==== October–December ====
- October 2 – Battle of Sauðafell in Iceland: Daði Guðmundsson of Snóksdalur defeats the forces of Catholic Bishop Jón Arason, resulting in Iceland becoming fully Protestant. Arason is captured; he is executed, along with his two sons, on November 7.
- November 25 – Luis de Velasco becomes the second Viceroy of New Spain, which encompasses all Spanish territory in North America and Central America. Velasco succeeds Antonio de Mendoza, the first Viceroy, who has been ordered to become the Viceroy of Peru.
- December 29 – Bhuvanaikabahu VII, King of Kotte on most of the island of Sri Lanka, is assassinated by a gunman hired by the government of Portuguese India.

==== Date unknown ====
- Altan Khan crosses the Great Wall of China and besieges Beijing, burning the suburbs.
- The summit level canal between the Alster and the Trave in Germany ceases to be navigable.
- The first grammatical description of the French language is published by Louis Maigret.
- The first book in Slovene, Catechismus, written by Protestant reformer Primož Trubar, is printed in Schwäbisch Hall, Holy Roman Empire.
- Nostradamus' first almanac is written.
- Approximate date – The discovery of silver at Guanajuato in Mexico stimulates silver rushes.

=== 1551 ===
==== January–March ====
- January 4 – Luca Spinola is elected to a two-year term as the new Doge of the Republic of Genoa, succeeding Gaspare Grimaldi Bracelli.
- January 11 (5th waxing of Tabodwe 912 ME) – King Bayinnaung of Burma is successful in capturing his ancestral city of Toungoo from his rebellious half-brother Minkhaung II, and sets about to make Toungoo the capital for the first time since 1539. Minkhaung is forgiven by King Bayinnaung rather than being executed, and assists in the King's campaign to capture the neighboring Kingdom of Prome.
- January– Macarius, Metropolitan of Moscow, and Tsar Ivan IV of Russia preside over the reforming Stoglavy Synod ("Hundred-Chapter") church council. A calendar of the saints and an ecclesiastical law code (Stoglav) are introduced.
- February 14 – Alice Arden and her lover, Richard Mosbey, carry out the murder-for-hire of her husband, Thomas Arden of Faversham with the assistance of a highwayman known as "Black Will", two of Arden’s domestic servants (Michael Saunderson and Elizabeth Stafford) and Mosbye's sister (Cicely Pounder). The body is carried outside, and Thomas is reported as missing, but a discovery is made that the murder was committed inside the house. The conspirators are later executed.
- February 23– At the Kremlin in Moscow, Tsar Ivan IV and the Metropolitan Macarius, present the proposed code of laws, drafted by the Stoglavy Synod, to the clergy, nobility and principal Russian citizens for their approval.
- March 27 – French mechanical engineer Aubin Olivier becomes the director of the new Royal Mint, the Moulin des Etuves on the Île de la Cité in Paris after having learned the technique of producing uniform milled coinage during a sabbatical in Germany.

==== April–June ====
- April 4 – Ferdinand I, Holy Roman Emperor, issues an edict to reduce tensions among the three major ethnic groups in the Kingdom of Hungary, with an administration to have equal representation of for ethnic Hungarians, Slovaks and Germans.
- May 1 – The Council of Trent reconvenes by order of Pope Julius III after having been adjourned on September 17, 1549.
- May 12 – The National University of San Marcos is founded in Lima in the Viceroyalty of Peru, being the first officially established university in the Americas.
- May 27 – Italian War of 1551–1559: A defensive alliance, placing the Duchy of Parma and Piacenza under the protection of France, is signed between representatives of King Henry II of France and Ottavio Farnese, Duke of Parma, placing Parma under French protection.
- May 30 – Ilie II Rareș, Ruler of Moldavia since 1556, is forced by the Ottoman Empire to abdicate the throne.
- June 11 – With the approval of the Ottoman Sultan Suleiman the Magnificent, Prince Ilie's brother Ștefan VI Rareș becomes the new Prince of Moldavia.
- June 27 – The Edict of Châteaubriant is promulgated in France by King Henri II, providing for an increasingly severe series of measures in the Roman Catholic Kingdom to be taken against Protestants, considered to be heretics.

==== July–September ====
- July 7 – The fifth, and final outbreak of sweating sickness in England reaches London, as documented by Henry Machyn in his diary, and continues until July 19. Machyn notes that "ther ded from the vii day of July unto the xix ded of the swett in London of all dyssesus viij/c, iij/xx and xij and no more in alle, and so the chanseller is sertefiyd." ("There died from the 7th day of July unto the 19th dead of the sweat in London of all diseases 8 hundred, 3 score and 12 [i.e., 872], and no more in all, and so the Chancellor is certified.") John Caius of Shrewsbury writes the first full contemporary account of the symptoms of the disease.
- July 12 – The regency over the Kingdom of Spain by Archduchess Maria and her husband, Archduke Maximilian of Austria, ends after almost three years when Maria's brother Crown Prince Philip returns to Madrid. Philip resumes his role as regent for King Charles I, the father of both Maria and Philip; Maria and Maximilian had served during the absence of both the King and the Crown Prince starting on October 1, 1548.
- July 18 – Invasion of Gozo: Ottoman Turks and Barbary pirates invade the Mediterranean island of Gozo (now part of Malta), and enslave almost all of its 6,000 inhabitants.
- July 19 – The Treaty of Weissenburg goes into effect as John Sigismund Zápolya, King of Hungary since 1540, abdicates in favor of Archduke Ferdinand of Austria. In addition, the independent Kingdom of Transylvania, ruled by Isabella Jagiellon, is ceded to the Kingdom of Hungary as part of peace with Ferdinand.
- July 30 – With the surrender of the island of Gozo, the Ottoman place 6,000 survivors on ships and transporting them to Tarhuna Wa Msalata (in modern-day Libya), where they are sold into slavery. The only natives left on the island are 300 persons who escaped the citadel and 41 elderly residents.
- August 15 – The Siege of Tripoli ends, with the Knights of Malta surrendering Tripoli to the Ottoman Empire.
- August 30 (1st waxing of Thadingyut 913 ME)– King Bayinnaung of Burma conquers the rebellious Kingdom of Prome (with a capital at Pyay) and kills the rebel Thado Thu, a former servant who had proclaimed himself as King Thado Dhamma Yaza after the 1550 assassination of King Tabinshwehti.
- September 21 – The Royal and Pontifical University of Mexico is founded in Mexico City (Mexico), being the second officially established university in the Americas.
- September 30 – (1st day of 9th month of Tenbun 21) Tainei-ji incident: A coup in Yamaguchi, by the military establishment of the Ōuchi clan, forces their lord Ōuchi Yoshitaka to commit suicide, and the city is burned.

==== October–December ====
- October 11 – John Dudley, Earl of Warwick, de facto Lord Protector of the Kingdom of England, is created Duke of Northumberland.
- November 20 – The Office of Cardinal Secretary of State, the second highest position in the Roman Catholic Church after the Pope, is created to temporarily fill the vacancy between the death of one Pontiff and the election of another. Cardinal Girolamo Dandini is appointed by Pope Julius III to serve as the first Secretary of State.
- December 16 – George Martinuzzi, the Hungarian Archbishop of Esztergom and the Governor of Transylvania, is assassinated by Marco Aurelio Ferrari on orders of Ferdinand, King of Hungary. Martinuzzi had been suspected of treason after attempting to negotiate a separate peace treaty with the Ottoman Empire.

==== Date unknown ====
- Qizilbash forces under the command of Tahmasp I raid and destroy the cave monastery of Vardzia in Georgia.
- In Henan province, China, during the Ming dynasty, a severe frost in the spring destroys the winter wheat crop. Torrential rains in mid summer cause massive flooding of farmland and villages (by some accounts submerged in a metre of water). In the fall, a large tornado demolishes houses and flattens much of the buckwheat in the fields. Famine victims either flee, starve, or resort to cannibalism. This follows a series of natural disasters in Henan in the years 1528, 1531, 1539, and 1545.
- In Slovakia, Guta (modern-day Kolárovo) receives town status.
- Portugal founds a sugar colony at Bahia.
- Juan de Betanzos begins to write his Narrative of the Incas.
- The new edition of the Genevan psalter, Pseaumes octantetrois de David, is published, with Louis Bourgeois as supervising composer, including the first publication of the hymn tune known as the Old 100th.

=== 1552 ===
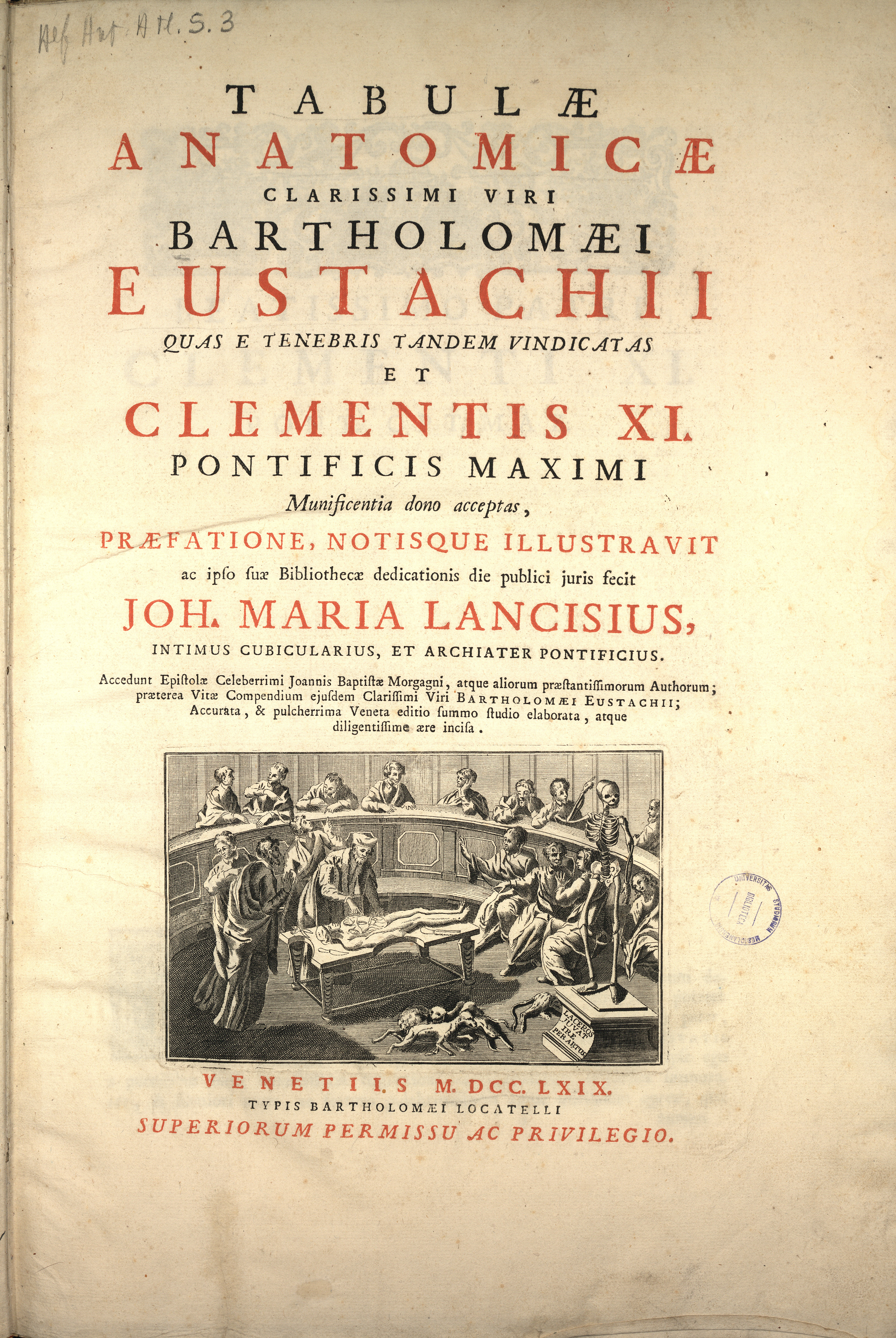
Bartolomeo Eustachi completes his Tabulae anatomicae.

==== January–March ====
- January 15 – Henry II of France and Maurice, Elector of Saxony, sign the Treaty of Chambord.
- February 12 – Pedro de Valdivia founds the Chilean city of Valdivia, as Santa María la Blanca de Valdivia.
- February 24 – The privileges of the Hanseatic League are abolished in England.
- March 26 – Guru Amar Das becomes the Third Sikh Guru.

==== April–June ====
- April 8 – Maurice, Elector of Saxony, liberates Augsburg and sets about to capture Charles V, Holy Roman Emperor.
- April 11 – Metz Cathedral is consecrated.
- April 15 – The Act of Uniformity is given royal assent and imposes use of the Protestant Book of Common Prayer on England.
- April 16 – Pedro de Valdivia founds the city of La Imperial, Chile.
- April 18 – King Henry II of France enters the city of Metz, ceded to France by Saxony by the January 15 Treaty of Chambord.
- April 28 – The delegates to the Council of Trent adjourn for two years after learning that the Holy Roman Emperor is fleeing from Maurice of Saxony.
- May 20 – Learning of the rapid approach of the Elector Maurice, the Emperor Charles V flees from Innsbruck ahead of being captured.
- June 6 (14th waxing of Waso 914 ME) – Minye Sithu is appointed as the Burmese Viceroy of Martaban by his older brother, Bayinnaung, King of Burma.
- June 16 – Yuri of Uglich, the only brother of the Russian Tsar Ivan the Terrible, is placed in charge of Russia's domestic affairs as Ivan departs Moscow to lead 150,000 troops in the Russo-Kazan War.
- June 22 – Peter Ernst I von Mansfeld-Vorderort, the Spanish Governor of Luxembourg, is taken prisoner by France and remains captive for almost five years.
- June 24 – The Portuguese ship São João is wrecked off of the coast of South Africa. While 480 people survive initially, all but 25 of them die during the next 165 days while trying to reach the mouth of the Maputo River in what is now Mozambique.

==== July–September ====
- July 6 – In Hungary, Drégely Castle is attacked by the Ottoman Empire. Captain György Szondy and c. 140 soldiers in the castle die, after 4 days of fighting against 8,000 Turkish raiders.
- July 27 – The Ottomans capture the city of Temesvar.
- August 2
  - John Frederick, Elector of Saxony and Philipp I of Hesse, taken prisoner by Charles V in 1546, are released.
  - The Peace of Passau revokes the Augsburg Interim of 1548, and promises religious freedom to the Protestant princes.
- September 9 – The Siege of Eger begins as thousands of Ottoman troops, led by General Kara Ahmed Pasha of the Ottoman Empire attack a greatly outnumbered force of Hungarian defenders, captained by István Dobó
- September 24 – The Debatable Lands on the border of England and Scotland are divided between the two kingdoms by a commission creating the Scots' Dike in an unsuccessful attempt to halt lawlessness here, but giving both countries their modern borders.

==== October–December ====
- October 2 – The Khanate of Kazan falls to troops of Ivan IV of Russia
- October 17 – After heavy losses by the Ottoman Empire, the Siege of Eger in Hungary is broken off by the Ottomans.
- November 15 – Radu Ilie Haidăul becomes the new Prince of Wallachia in what is now Romania after defeating Prince Mircea the Shepherd at the battle of Mănești. Prince Mircea retakes the throne seven months later.
- November 18 – Simeon Sulaka arrives in Rome from the Middle Eastern city of Mosul and brings a letter asking Pope Julius III to appoint him as the Patriarch of the Church of the East, leader of the Chaldean Catholic Church.
- November 24 – Thomas Cranmer, Archbishop of Canterbury and top cleric of the Church of England, delivers the proposed Forty-two Articles to the Privy Council of King Edward VI.
- December 26 – Pope Julius III issues a papal brief revoking resolutions passed by the colegii Papal State of Bologna in Italy.

==== Date unknown ====
- Miguel de Buría leads the first African rebellion in South America's history. This may be because Buría has more slaves than other regions in Venezuela, of which most join Miguel, and is still being contested between the Europeans and the natives, who also join his side. During this insurrection he takes over the Gold mines de San Felipe de Buría, established within the area with the consent of the Spanish Crown, to pull out the ore that was discovered in the Buria river, a task that heavily depends on slave work.
- In the Persian Gulf, the Ottoman Empire Red Sea Fleet attacks the Portuguese stronghold of Hormuz, but fails to capture it.
- In Italy, Bartolomeo Eustachi completes his Tabulae anatomicae, presenting his discoveries on the structure of the inner ear and heart, although, for fear of the Inquisition, it will not be published until 1714.
- King Edward VI of England founds 35 grammar schools by royal charter, including Shrewsbury; Leeds Grammar School is also established.

=== 1553 ===
==== January–March ====
- January 2 – The siege of Metz in France, started by Charles V, Holy Roman Emperor during the Italian War of 1551–59 on October 19 last is lifted after 75 days. During the city's defense by the Duke of Guise and 6,000 soldiers, Charles V had lost two-thirds of his original force of at least 20,000 men.
- February 17 – In India, Timmaraja Wodeyar II becomes the sixth maharaja of the Kingdom of Mysore (a vassal state of the Vijayanagara Empire), after the death of his father, the Maharaja Chamaraja Wodeyar III.
- February 21 – Lieutenant General Luis Álvarez de Toledo y Osorio temporarily serves as the Spanish Viceroy of Naples (in modern-day Italy) upon the death of his father, Pedro Álvarez de Toledo. Luis steps down after Pedro Pacheco de Villena is appointed as the new Viceroy in June.
- March 1 – The second (and last) session of the Parliament of England during the reign of King Edward VI is opened by the King at Westminster and lasts until March 31. Sir James Dyer serves during the session as Speaker of the House of Commons.

==== April–June ====
- April 28 – Shimun VIII Yohannan Sulaqa, leader of the Chaldean Catholic Church in modern-day Iraq, is recognized by Pope Julius III as the Patriarch of Mosul.
- May 12 – St Albans, in England, receives its first royal charter as a borough.
- May 25 – Lady Jane Grey, a 16-year-old first cousin of King Edward VI of England, marries Lord Guildford Dudley, son of the Duke of Northumberland, who has engineered the marriage.
- June 3 – The first of the five Battles of Kawanakajima, the "Battle of the Fuse," commences in Japan between Takeda Shingen of Kai Province and Uesugi Kenshin of Echigo Province. The clash, fought 12 days after Shingen has taken Katsurao Castle, takes place at a shrine of Hachiman (near modern-day Yashiro, Hyōgo prefecture), is part of a major series of conflicts during the Japanese Sengoku period.
- June 15 – On his deathbed, King Edward summons prominent English judges and signs his devise of the throne to Lady Jane Grey.
- June 21 – Under threats from the Duke of Northumberland, the devise by King Edward to make Jane Grey the heir to the throne is signed by over 100 prominent persons.
- June 26 – Two new schools, Christ's Hospital and King Edward's School, Witley, are created by royal charter in accordance with the will of King Edward VI of England; St Thomas' Hospital, London, in existence since the 12th century, is named in the same charter.

==== July–September ====
- July 6 – King King Edward VI of England dies at the age of 15 after a reign of only six years.
- July 9 – Battle of Sievershausen: Prince-elector Maurice of Saxony defeats the Catholic forces of Margrave Albert of Brandenburg-Kulmbach. Maurice is mortally wounded.
- July 10 – Four days after the death of her cousin King Edward VI of England, Lady Jane Grey is proclaimed Queen of England – a position she holds for the next nine days.
- July 19 – The Lord Mayor of London proclaims Mary I the rightful Queen, following a change of allegiance by the Privy Council; Lady Jane Grey voluntarily abdicates.
- August 3 – Queen Mary I of England arrives in London from East Anglia.
- August 18 – John Dudley, 1st Duke of Northumberland, is tried and convicted of treason for his role in putting his daughter-in-law, Lady Jane Grey, on the throne.
- August 24 – English explorer Richard Chancellor enters the White Sea and reaches Arkhangelsk. He goes on afterwards to the court of Ivan IV of Russia, opening up trade between England and Russia.
- September 23 – The Sadians consolidate their power in Morocco, by defeating the last of their enemies.
- September – Anglican bishops in England are arrested, and Roman Catholic bishops are restored.

==== October–December ====
- October 6 – Şehzade Mustafa, oldest son of Suleiman the Magnificent, is executed in Konya by order of his father.
- October 27 – Geneva's governing council burns Michael Servetus at the stake as a heretic.
- November 13 – Lady Jane Grey, who had claimed the title of Queen of England for nine days, is convicted of high treason, along with her husband Lord Guilford Dudley, two of Dudley's brothers, and Thomas Cranmer, the former Archbishop of Canterbury, after trial conducted by a special commission at Guildhall in the City of London. Referred to by the court as "Jane Dudley, wife of Guildford", Lady Jane is found to have treacherously assumed the title and the power of the monarch of England, as evidenced by a number of documents she had signed as "Jane the Quene". All five defendants are sentenced to death. Beheading is the sentence for the men, while Lady Jane is to either be "burned alive on Tower Hill or beheaded as the Queen pleases", with the decision (for a private decapitation) to be made by Queen Mary.
- November 16 – A delegation from the English Parliament formally asks the new queen, Mary I, to choose an English husband rather than to marry Spain's Prince Philip, and suggests Edward Courtenay, 1st Earl of Devon. Queen Mary's choice to marry Philip, in the interests of protecting England from an invasion, will ultimately lead to Wyatt's rebellion.
- November 17 (13th waxing of Natdaw 915 ME) – Bayinnaung, King of Burma, commissions the building of the Kanbawzathadi Palace in his capital, Pegu (modern-day Bago in Myanmar). The palace is completed in 1556 but is burned down in 1599.
- November 25 – Italian War of 1551–1559: Cosimo I de' Medici, Duke of the Florentine Republic, signs a secret treaty with Charles V, Holy Roman Emperor to conquer the Republic of Siena to bring it back into the Empire.
- November 25 – Second Margrave War: The city of Kulmbach, near Brandenburg in Bavaria in Germany, is sacked and burned to the ground after its margrave, Albert Alcibiades, makes an unsuccessful attempt to bring all of the Duchy of Franconia under his control.
- December 25 – Battle of Tucapel: Mapuche rebels under Lautaro defeat the Spanish conquistadors, and execute Pedro de Valdivia, the first Royal Governor of Chile.

==== Date unknown ====
- Tonbridge School is founded by Sir Andrew Judde, under letters patent of Edward VI of England.
- The xiii Bukes of Eneados of the famose Poete Virgill, the first complete translation of any major work of classical antiquity into one of the English languages, is published in London.
- In Ming dynasty China:
  - The addition of a new section of the Outer City fortifications is completed in southern Beijing, bringing the overall size of Beijing to 18 square miles (4662 hectares).
  - Shanghai is fortified for the first time.

=== 1554 ===
==== January–March ====
- January 5 – A great fire breaks out in Eindhoven, Netherlands.
- January 12 (10th waxing of Tabodwe 915 ME) – Bayinnaung is crowned king of the Burmese Taungoo Dynasty at his new capital at Pegu, after a previous coronation on January 11, 1551, and takes the regnal name of Thiri Thudhamma Yaza.
- January 21 – Edward Courtenay, one of the four plotters of Wyatt's rebellion in England, is arrested and reveals that an attempt will be made to overthrow the English government.
- January 25 – São Paulo, Brazil, is founded.
- January 27 – Wyatt's rebellion begins in England at Maidstone as Sir Thomas Wyatt reads a proclamation that Queen Mary of England’s marriage to King Philip of Spain will "bring upon this realm most miserable servitude, and establish popish religion". Within two days, Wyatt has raised 2,000 soldiers to join his plan to overthrow Queen Mary.
- January 30 – Henry Grey, Duke of Suffolk, one of the English conspirators in Wyatt's rebellion, leads troops from Leicester to Coventry, but the group finds that the gates of the city are closed because the rebellion has been exposed.
- February 9 – Thomas Wyatt surrenders to government forces in London.
- February 12 – After claiming the throne of England the previous year, Lady Jane Grey is beheaded for treason.
- March 18 – Princess Elizabeth is imprisoned in the Tower of London on charges of working with the organizers of Wyatt's rebellion for the overthrow of Queen Mary of England.

==== April–June ====
- April 12 – Mary of Guise becomes Regent of Scotland.
- May 9 – Elizabeth is released from the Tower of London, although she continues to be confined at home after she is cleared of suspicion of conspiracy to overthrow the government.
- June 11 – Italian General Piero Strozzi successfully defends an attack on the Republic of Siena by French troops, led by Cosimo de' Medici at the battle of Pontedera, but suffers a tremendous loss of his own troops in the process.

==== July–September ====
- July 25– Queen Mary I of England marries King Prince Philip of Naples, the only son of Charles V, Holy Roman Emperor and heir to the throne of Spain, at Winchester Cathedral just two days after their first meeting.
- August 2 – Battle of Marciano: Senese–French forces are defeated by the Florentine–Imperial army.
- August 12 – Battle of Renty: French forces led by Francis, Duke of Guise turn back an invasion of Picardy, by Charles V.
- September 13 (Shawwal 15, 961 AH) – At the Battle of Tadla in Morocco, Mohammed ash-Sheikh, ruler of the Saadi dynasty enters the city of Fez and becomes the undisputed sultan. Ali Abu Hassun, last ruler of the Wattasid dynasty, flees.

==== October–December ====
- October 8 – In Peru, an 11-month long rebellion by Francisco Hernández Girón is ended at the Battle of Pucará with the rebels defeated by the Viceroy of Peru near Cuzco.
- October 21 – The Plassenburg castle in Bavaria, residence of the ruling House of Hohenzollern in the Principality of Ansbach, is destroyed during the Second Margrave War.
- November 1 – English captain John Lok, commanding three ships (the Trinitie, the Bartholomew and the John Evangelist), departs from Dartmouth in England to voyage to the Guinea Coast at West Africa.
- November 22 – Upon the death of his father, Sultan Islam Shah Suri, 10-year-old Firuz Shah Suri becomes the Sultan of the Sur Empire at Delhi, but he is murdered within a few days.
- December 22 – The John Lok expedition reaches Guinea, anchoring at the Sesto River and remains for seven days to begin trading."

==== Date unknown ====
- Mikael Agricola becomes the bishop of Turku.
- Saadi conquers the Kingdom of Fez.
- Exact center year of Counter Reformation.
- The name of the beer brewed by New Belgium Brewing Company is based on a recipe from this date, called "1554."
- Luso-Chinese agreement: Portugal reaches an agreement with the Ming Dynasty of China, to be allowed to legally trade in the province of Guangdong. This agreement is often seen as a starting point of the Portuguese colony of Macau
- Rao Surjan Singh becomes ruler of Bundi.

=== 1555 ===
==== January–March ====
- January 22 – The Kingdom of Ava in Upper Burma falls.
- February 2 – The Diet of Augsburg begins.
- February 4 – John Rogers is burned at the stake at Smithfield, London, becoming the first of the 284 Protestant martyrs of the English Reformation to be killed during the five and one-half year reign of Queen Mary I of England. His death is followed within the week by that of Laurence Saunders on February 8 in Coventry, and Rowland Taylor, Rector of Hadleigh, Suffolk, and John Hooper, deposed Bishop of Gloucester on February 9.
- February 26 – The Muscovy Company is chartered in England to trade with the Tsardom of Russia and Richard Chancellor negotiates with the Tsar.
- March 25 – Valencia, Venezuela, is founded by Captain Alonso Díaz Moreno.

==== April–June ====
- April 9 – Marcello Cervini degli Spannocchi is unanimously chosen as the successor to Pope Julius III, who died on March 23, and takes the name of Pope Marcellus II as the 222nd Pontiff of the Roman Catholic Church. He will reign for 22 days.
- April 17 – After 18 months of siege, the Republic of Siena surrenders to the Florentine–Imperial army.
- May 1 – Foundation of St John's College, Oxford, England, to teach Catholic theology.
- May 30 – Foundation of Trinity College, Oxford, England, to teach Catholic theology.
- May 15 – The conclave opens with 42 of the 56 Roman Catholic cardinals to choose a successor to Pope Marcellus II, who had died on May 1.
- May 23 – Giovanni Pietro Carafa, Cardinal of Naples, is elected as the new Pope after Giacomo del Pozzo fails to obtain the necessary two-thirds approval. Carafa, the 223rd Pope, takes the name Pope Paul IV.
- May 25 – Jeanne d'Albret becomes the Queen of Navarre upon the death of her father, King Henry II.
- June 1 – The Treaty of Amasya between the Ottoman Empire and Safavid Persia concludes the Ottoman-Safavid War.
- June 22 – Adil Shah Suri becomes the Sultan of the Sur Empire at Delhi in India after Sikandar Shah Suri is forced to flee from the Mughal Empire forces.

==== July–September ====
- July 12 – Pope Paul IV creates the Roman Ghetto, the first Jewish ghetto in Rome.
- August 24 – England's Thomas Thirlby, the first and only Roman Catholic Archbishop of Norwich and Queen Mary's envoy to Pope Paul IV, returns to London from bearing a papal bull that confirms Queen Mary's jurisdiction over Ireland.
- September 25 – The Peace of Augsburg is signed between Charles V, Holy Roman Emperor, and the Lutheran Schmalkaldic League, establishing the principle Cuius regio, eius religio, that is, rulers within the Empire can choose the religion of their realm.
- September – The 1555 Kashmir earthquake causes widespread destruction and death in Kashmir, India.

==== October–December ====
- October 16
  - (1st day of 10th month Tenbun 24) – At the Battle of Miyajima Island, Mori Motonari defeats Sue Harukata.
  - The first two Protestant Oxford Martyrs, Hugh Latimer and Nicholas Ridley, are burned at the stake in England.
- October 25 – Charles V abdicates as Holy Roman Emperor and is succeeded by his brother Ferdinand.
- November 1 – French Navy Vice-Admiral Nicolas Durand de Villegaignon leads a small fleet of two ships and 200 soldiers and colonists to take possession of Serigipe Island, near modern-day Rio de Janeiro in Brazil at Guanabara Bay, and builds Fort Coligny.
- November 13 – Thomas Cranmer is officially removed from office as the Protestant Archbishop of Canterbury by order of Pope Paul IV and Queen Mary I.
- December 11 – Cardinal Reginald Pole is made a cardinal-priest in the Roman Catholic Church and made the administrator of the See of Canterbury in England, though he will not become the new Archbishop of Canterbury until the following March 20.

==== Date unknown ====
- Russia breaks a 60-year-old truce with Sweden by attacking Finland.
- Humayun resumes rule of the Mughal Empire.
- The Adal Sultanate in the Horn of Africa collapses.
- English captain John Lok returns from Guinea, with five Africans to train as interpreters for future trading voyages.
- Richard Eden publishes The Decades of the Newe Worlde or West India, a translation into English of parts of Pietro Martire d'Anghiera's De orbe novo decades, the Gonzalo Fernández de Oviedo y Valdés work Natural hystoria de las Indias and others, urging his countrymen to follow the lead of Spain in exploring the New World; the work includes the first recorded use in English of the country name 'China'.
- Establishment in England of the following grammar schools: Boston Grammar School, Gresham's School at Holt, Norfolk (founded by Sir John Gresham) and Ripon Grammar School (re-foundation).
- William Annyas becomes the Mayor of Youghal, Ireland, the first Jew to hold such a position in Ireland.
- John Dee is charged, but cleared, of treason in England.
- Orlande de Lassus' first book of madrigals is published, in Antwerp.

=== 1556 ===
==== January–March ====
- January 4 – In Japan, Saitō Yoshitatsu, the eldest son of Saitō Dōsan, arranges the murders of his two younger brothers, Magoshiro and Kiheiji, and forces his father to flee from the Sagiyama Castle.
- January 16 – Charles V abdicates the thrones of the Spanish Empire (including his colonies in the New World) in favor of his son, Philip II, and retires to a monastery.
- January 23 – The Shaanxi earthquake, the deadliest earthquake in history, occurs with its epicenter in Shaanxi province, China; 830,000 people may have been killed.
- January 24 – In India, at the Sher Mandal in Delhi, the Mughal Emperor Humayun trips while descending the stairs from his library and strikes the side of his head against a stone step, sustaining a fatal injury. He never regains consciousness and dies seven days later.
- February 5 – Truce of Vaucelles: Fighting temporarily ends between France and Spain.
- February 14 – Akbar the Great ascends the throne of the Mughal Empire in India at age 13; he will rule until his death in 1605, by which time most of the north and centre of the Indian subcontinent will be under his control.
- March 21 – In Oxford, Thomas Cranmer, the former Archbishop of Canterbury, is burned at the stake for treason for his role in the English Reformation as chief bishop of the Anglican Church.
- March 22 – Reginald Pole, a Roman Catholic Cardinal, is appointed by Queen Mary of England as the new Archbishop of Canterbury and head of the Catholic Archdiocese of Canterbury.

==== April–June ====
- April 3 – In Qazvin, the Shah of Iran Tahmasp I, becomes enraged with the sexual orientation of his son Ismail II, and sends Ismail to Afghanistan to serve as the Iranian governor of Herat province.
- April 24 – Pál Márkházy surrenders the Hungarian fortress at Ajnácskő (now Hajnáčka in Slovakia) to the Ottoman Empire. Márkházy, accused of treachery, is stripped of his estates and title by the King of Hungary, and forced to flee to the Principality of Transylvania.
- May 28 (20th day of 4th month of Kōji 2) – In Japan, the Battle of Nagara-gawa takes place along the Nagara River in Mino Province near what is now the Gifu Prefecture. Saitō Yoshitatsu, with 17,500 troops, overwhelms and kills his father, Saitō Dōsan, who had attempted to avenge the Saitō family honor with less than 3,000 people.
- June 14 – Lorenzo Priuli becomes the new Doge of the Venetian Republic.
- June 27 – Thirteen English Protestants (11 men and two women), the "Stratford Martyrs", are burned at the stake at Stratford-le-Bow near London after being convicted of heresy.

==== July–September ====
- July 17 – Kostajnica Fortress in what is now Croatia falls to the Ottoman Empire and remains under Turkish control for the next 132 years.
- August 15 – Work begins on the Peresopnytsia Gospel at the Monastery of the Holy Trinity in the Grand Duchy of Lithuania, and continues for the next five years.
- August 27 – Charles V abdicates his position as Holy Roman Emperor in favor of his younger brother, Ferdinand, King of the Romans. The Imperial Diet postpones recognizing the abdication for the next 18 months.
- September 1 – After Pope Paul IV attempts to get King Henry II of France to join him in an invasion of Spanish-controlled Naples, Spain's Duke of Alba invades the Papal States in Italy.

==== October–December ====
- October 7 – The Battle of Delhi is fought in India, at Tughlaqabad) near Delhi between forces of the Sur Empire (ruled by Muhammad Adil Shah) and the Mughal Empire (ruled by Akbar the Great). General Hemchandra Vikramaditya (Hemu) of the Suris overwhelms the forces commanded by the Mughal Governor of Delhi, Tardi Beg Khan within one day.
- November 5 – Second Battle of Panipat: Fifty miles north of Delhi, a Mughal army defeats the forces of Hemu and recaptures Delhi for the Mughal Empire, guaranteeing Akbar's rule.
- November 10 – The English ship Edward Bonadventure, commanded by Richard Chancellor is wrecked on the coast of Scotland at Pitsligo, killing most of its crew, including Chancellor. The few survivors include the first Russian ambassador to England, Osip Nepeya.
- November 17 – In the Holy Roman Empire, the Steter Kriegsrat is founded as a War Council with five generals and five civil servants to advise the Habsburg rulers.
- December 7 – The Mughal Emperor Akbar personally travels with Bairam Khan to lead an invasion force to defeat the Sultan of the Sur Empire, Sikandar Shah Suri.
- December 27 – Péter Erdődy is appointed as the Ottoman Viceroy of Croatia after the death on September 7 of Nikola IV Zrinski.
- December 31 – All military authorities in the Holy Roman Empire are ordered to submit to the decisions of the Imperial War Council.

==== Date unknown ====
- The kings of Spain take control of the Flanders region, including what is now the French département of Nord.
- The Plantations of Ireland are started in King's County (now County Offaly) and Queen's County (now County Laois), the earliest attempt at systematic ethnic cleansing in Ireland, by the Roman Catholic ruler Queen Mary I of England.
- Future King Prince John, younger son of King Gustav I of Sweden becomes Duke of Finland.
- Ivan the Terrible conquers Astrakhan, opening the Volga River to Russian traffic and trade.
- The Welser banking families of Augsburg lose colonial control of Venezuela.
- The false Martin Guerre appears in the French village of Artigat.
- The first printing press in India is introduced by Jesuits, at Saint Paul's College, Goa.

=== 1557 ===
==== January–March ====
- January 4 – Pietro Giovanni Chiavica Cibo becomes the new Doge of the Republic of Genoa for a term of 2 years as the term of the Doge Agostino Pinelli Ardimenti comes to an end.
- January 6 – Italian War of 1551–1559: Gaspard II de Coligny, the French governor of Picardy (in northern France), launches surprise attacks on Douai and Lens in the Spanish Netherlands and captures both cities for France.
- January 13 – Sigismund II Augustus, King of Poland and Grand Duke of Lithuania, issues an edict against Protestants, at the urging of the Archbishop Mikołaj Dzierzgowski, Primate of Poland.
- January 28 – Bayinnaung, King of Burma and head of the Toungoo dynasty, conquers two the Shan States, Möng Mit and Hsipaw in what is now northern Myanmar. The event is later commemorated with an inscription on the Shwezigon Pagoda Bell.
- February 4 – Pope Paul IV creates the metropolitan archdiocese of Portuguese India (based in Goa) separating the Goan diocese from the ecclesiastical province of Lisbon.
- February 24 – Delegates from Sweden, Finland and Russia arrive at Novgorod to negotiate a treaty to end the war between the two empires.
- March 11 – The Burmese conquest of the Shan States continues as the capital of the Mongkawng state, Mong Kawng, falls to the Toungoo dynasty invaders, five days after the March 6 surrender of the town of Mong Yang. The event is later commemorated on the Shwezigon Pagoda Bell.
- March – The Takeda clan besiege Katsurayama Castle in eastern Japan. The siege ends with the last stand of the castle garrison, and the complete destruction of Katsurayama, allowing the Takeda to further expand in Shinano Province.

==== April–June ====
- April 2 – The Treaty of Novgorod between Sweden and Russia is put into effect as delegates kiss the cross, as demanded by the Tsar Ivan IV.
- April 12 – The Spanish settlement of Cuenca, Ecuador, is founded.
- April 25 – English aristocrat Thomas Stafford attempts a rebellion against Queen Mary, landing at Scarborough, North Yorkshire with two ships and 32 followers after crossing the English Channel from Dieppe in France. Upon landing, he captures Scarborough Castle and proclaims himself "Protector of the Realm".
- April 28 – Henry Neville, 5th Earl of Westmorland, arrives in Scarborough and ends the Stafford rebellion, arresting Stafford and the small rebel force.
- April 30 – Arauco War – Battle of Mataquito: Spanish forces of Governor Francisco de Villagra launch a dawn surprise attack against the Mapuche (headed by their toqui Lautaro), in present-day Chile.
- May 4 – The Stationers' Company, officially the Worshipful Company of Stationers and Newspaper Makers, is granted a royal charter and a monopoly on the English publishing industry. For the next 150 years, the Stationers will regulate and censor the printing industry until the passage of the Copyright Act 1710 on April 10, 1710.
- May 23 – The Shwezigon Pagoda Bell, weighing 7,560 pounds (3,430 kg), is dedicated. The Bell, commissioned by King Bayinnaung and located in the Myanmar city of Bagan, bears a detailed inscription of the 16th century Burmese conquest of the Shan States.
- May 28 – English rebel Thomas Stafford and 32 of his followers are beheaded at the Tower of London after being convicted of treason.
- May 29 – King Philip II of Spain signs a treaty in London with Iacopo VI being restored to rule of the Principality of Piombino a bargain with Cosimo I de' Medici.
- June 7 – Mary I of England joins her husband Philip II of Spain, in his war against France.
- June 10 – The New Testament of the Geneva Bible, a Protestant Bible translation into English (produced under the supervision of William Whittingham, and printed in Roman type), is published in Geneva.
- June 16 Sebastião I is crowned as the new King of Portugal, five days after the death of his father, King João III.
- June 18 – Mass executions by burning at the stake resume in England for Protestants convicted of heresy under the law of England's Catholic ruler, Queen Mary. On the first day, four women and three men are put to death at Maidstone at Kent. The next day, at Canterbury, another seven prisoners are burned. On June 22, ten more people (six men and four women) burn at the stake at Lewes at Sussex. In all, 24 people (12 men and 12 women) are killed in a five-day period
- By June – The 1557 influenza pandemic, probably originating in China, spreads to Europe.

==== July–September ====
- July 3 – The small Stato dei Presidi, a 300 square kilometres (120 sq mi) section of Spanish territory on the Tuscan coast of Italy, is created by a treaty between Cosimo I de' Medici (Duke of the Florentine Republic and the future Grand Duke of Tuscany) and King Felipe II of Spain. In return, Cosimo receives the rest of the former Republic of Siena.
- July 24 – The Edict of Compiègne is issued by King Henri II of France, providing for the death penalty to be applied to Protestants for a variety of crimes, including a relapse after having renounced Protestantism; unauthorized travel to Geneva; publication of Protestant books; possessing graven images; and unauthorized participation in Protestant religious gatherings, whether public or private.
- July 25 – In India, Sikandar Shah Suri, Sultan of the Sur Empire in Punjab, surrenders the fortress at Mau in the Nurpur kingdom (now in Uttar Pradesh) after a six month siege by the Mughal Empire. Mughal General Bairam Khan allows Sikandar to live in exile in Bihar, while Bakht Mal, Raja of Nurpur is imprisoned at Lahore and later beheaded.
- August 27 – Battle of St. Quentin: French forces under Marshal Anne de Montmorency are decisively defeated by the Spanish and English under Emmanuel Philibert, Duke of Savoy, after a 17-day battle. Montmorency himself is captured, but Philip II refuses to press his advantage, and withdraws to the Netherlands.
- September 11– The Colloquy of Worms convenes in Germany as a dialog on religious issues between clerics of the German Catholic Church and the Lutheran Church.
- September 12– The Spanish occupation of the Papal States is confirmed as Pope Paul IV signs a separate peace treaty, the Peace of Cave-Palestrina, with Spain's Duke of Alba, who has massed troops outside of Rome in preparationfor an attack.

==== October–December ====
- October 8 – The Colloquy of Worms is adjourned with no resolution on reconciling the differences between Catholicism and Protestantism, after the parties are unable to agree on the concepts of original sin and theological justification.
- October 23 – Mohammed al-Shaykh, Sultan of Morocco since 1549, is assassinated by Ottoman soldiers who had infiltrated the Moroccan army. The assassination comes on orders of the Ottoman sultan after Mohammed makes plans for an alliance with Spain against the Ottoman Empire. Mohammed is succeeded by his son, Abdallah al-Ghalib.
- November 17 (27th day of the 10th month of Kōji 3) – Prince Michihito of Japan becomes the Emperor Ōgimachi almost two months after the September 27 death of his father, the Emperor Go-Nara.
- December 24 – In Bucharest, Mircea the Shepherd becomes the Prince of Wallachia for the third time, succeeding Pătrașcu the Good, who has died suddenly.
- December 30 – Italian War of 1551–1559: King Henri II of France, through his ambassador Jean Cavenac de la Vigne sends a letter to Suleiman the Magnificent, Sultan of the Ottoman Empire for the dispatch of 150 Ottoman Navy ships to protect the French coast.

==== Date unknown ====
- Özdemir Pasha conquers the Red Sea port of Massawa for the Ottoman Empire.
- With the permission of the Ming dynasty government of China, and for the benefit of both Western and Eastern merchants, the Portuguese settle in Macau (retroceded in 1999). Direct Sino-Portuguese trade has existed since 1513, but this is the first official legal treaty port on traditional Chinese soil, that will form a long-term Western settlement.
- Spain becomes bankrupt, throwing the German banking houses into chaos.
- Gonville and Caius College, Cambridge, is refounded by John Caius.
- The following schools are founded in England:
  - Brentwood School, Essex, by Sir Antony Browne.
  - Hampton School, Hampton, London, by Robert Hammond.
  - Repton School, by Sir John Port.
- Welsh-born mathematician Robert Recorde publishes The Whetstone of Witte in London, containing the first recorded use of the equals sign, and the first use in English of plus and minus signs.
- German adventurer Hans Staden publishes a widely translated account of his detention by the Tupí people of Brazil, Warhaftige Historia und beschreibung eyner Landtschafft der Wilden Nacketen, Grimmigen Menschfresser-Leuthen in der Newenwelt America gelegen ("True Story and Description of a Country of Wild, Naked, Grim, Man-eating People in the New World, America").

=== 1558 ===
==== January–March ====
- January 7 – French troops, led by Francis, Duke of Guise, take Calais, the last continental possession of the Kingdom of England, in the Siege of Calais.
- January 22 – The Livonian War begins.
- February 2 – The University of Jena is founded in Thuringia, Germany.
- February 4 – (16th day of 1st month of Eiroku 1) Takeda Shingen becomes the shugo (military governor) of Shinano Province after his successful military campaign there.
- February 5 – Arauco War: Pedro de Avendaño, with sixty men, captures Caupolicán (the Mapuche Gran Toqui), who is leading their first revolt against the Spanish Empire (near Antihuala), encamped with a small band of followers.
- March 8 – The city of Pori (Swedish: Björneborg) is founded by Duke John on the shores of the Gulf of Bothnia.

==== April–June ====
- April 17 – The siege of Thionville in the Duchy of Luxembourg, is started by the French Army, led by Francis, Duke of Guise.
- April 24 – Mary, Queen of Scots, marries Francis, Dauphin of France, at Notre Dame de Paris.
- May 3 – The Imperial Diet of the Holy Roman Empire gives recognition to Ferdinand as Holy Roman Emperor, two months after his proclamation on March 14 as the successor to his brother Charles V.
- June 13 – An armada of ships from the Ottoman Empire, dispatched by Sultan Suleyman the Magnificent at the request of King Henry II of France, sails into the Bay of Naples at Italy and attacks the city of Sorrento.
- June 23 – France is successful in the siege of Thionville in the Duchy of Luxembourg and recovers the fortress from the Spanish Empire after an operation that began on April 17 and lasted more than two months.

==== July–September ====
- July 9 – The Ottoman Empire, with 15,000 troops and 150 warships, besieges the Spanish garrison at Ciutadella de Menorca at Spain's Balearic Islands. When the town falls on July 17, the 3,099 surviving inhabitants are sold into slavery.
- July 13 – Battle of Gravelines: Near the border between the Kingdom of France and the Spanish Netherlands, Spanish forces led by Lamoral, Count of Egmont, and assisted by the English Navy, inflict a major defeat on the French forces of Marshal Paul de Thermes.
- July 18 – The city of Tartu, capital of the Bishopric of Dorpat (in modern-day Estonia) surrenders to Russia.
- August 22 – In Spain, Bartolomé Carranza, the Roman Catholic Archbishop of Toledo, is arrested at Torrelaguna on orders of the Grand Inquisitor, Fernando de Valdés y Salas. Carranza is brought a prisoner to Valladolid to face accusations of heresy. He remains in prison for eight years before being transferred to Rome for the Pope to hear his appeal.

==== October–December ====
- October 17 – Postal history of Poland: King Sigismund II Augustus appoints an Italian merchant living in Kraków to organise a consolidated postal service in Poland, the origin of Poczta Polska.
- November 6 – On her deathbed, Queen Mary of England designates her half-sister, Elizabeth, as her successor. Both Mary and Elizabeth are daughters of the late King Henry VIII.
- November 15 – The five Canterbury Martyrs, three men and two women, are burned at the stake, becoming the last of 312 Protestants put to death for heresy during the reign of England's last Roman Catholic ruler, Queen Mary. Queen Mary dies two days later, bringing an end to her campaign. During the final year of Mary's reign, 49 Protestants are burned at the stake and three others die in prison while awaiting execution.
- November 17 – Queen Mary, a devout Roman Catholic dies of uterine cancer at the age of 42, and is succeeded by her younger half-sister Elizabeth, an adherent to the Protestant Church of England, beginning the Elizabethan era in British history.
- December 5 – Less than three weeks of becoming Queen of England, Elizabeth summons the members of the English Parliament with orders to assemble at Westminster on January 23. Under Elizabeth's agenda, the Parliament is charged with restoring the laws passed at the beginning of the English Reformation, and repealing the reforms made during the reign of Queen Mary.

==== Unknown ====
- John Knox's attack on female rulers, The First Blast of the Trumpet Against the Monstruous Regiment of Women, is published anonymously from Geneva.
- English explorer Anthony Jenkinson travels from Moscow to Astrakhan and Bukhara. He is the first Englishman to note that the Amu Darya changed course, to start flowing into the Aral Sea.
- Queen Elizabeth I of England grants rest and refreshment to pilgrims and travellers who pass by the Holy Well Spring at Malvern in England.

==== Ongoing ====
- 1557 influenza pandemic.

=== 1559 ===
==== January–March ====
- January 15 – Elizabeth I of England is crowned, in Westminster Abbey.
- February 27 – Queen Elizabeth I of England establishes the Church of England, with the Act of Uniformity 1558 and the Act of Supremacy 1558. The Oath of Supremacy is reinstated.
- March 23 – Emperor Gelawdewos of Ethiopia, defending his lands against the invasion of Nur ibn Mujahid, Sultan of Harar, is killed in battle. His brother, Menas, succeeds him as king.
- March 31 – The Westminster Conference 1559 opens at Westminster Hall in London with nine leading Catholic churchmen, and nine Protestant reformers of the Church of England. The conference adjourns on April 3 for Easter and never reconvenes.

==== April–June ====
- April 3 – Peace of Cateau Cambrésis: After two days of negotiations, France makes peace with England and Spain, ending the Italian War of 1551–59. France gives up most of its gains in Italy (including Savoy), retaining only Saluzzo, but keeps the three Lorraine bishoprics of Metz, Toul, and Verdun, and the formerly English town of Calais.
- May 2 – John Knox returns from exile to Scotland, to become the leader of the beginning Scottish Reformation.
- May 8 – Queen Elizabeth of England gives royal assent to the Act of Supremacy 1558 (requiring any person taking public or church office in England to swear allegiance to the English monarch as Supreme Governor of the Church of England) and to the Act of Uniformity 1558 (requiring all persons in England to attend Anglican services on penalty of a fine for noncompliance).
- May 13 – At Basel, the body of Dutch Anabaptist leader David Joris is exhumed and burned, following his posthumous conviction of heresy.
- June 11 – Scottish Reformation: A Protestant mob, incited by the preaching of John Knox, sacks St Andrews Cathedral.
- June 22 – King Philip II of Spain and the 14-year-old Elisabeth of Valois are married in Spain, having married by proxy in January.

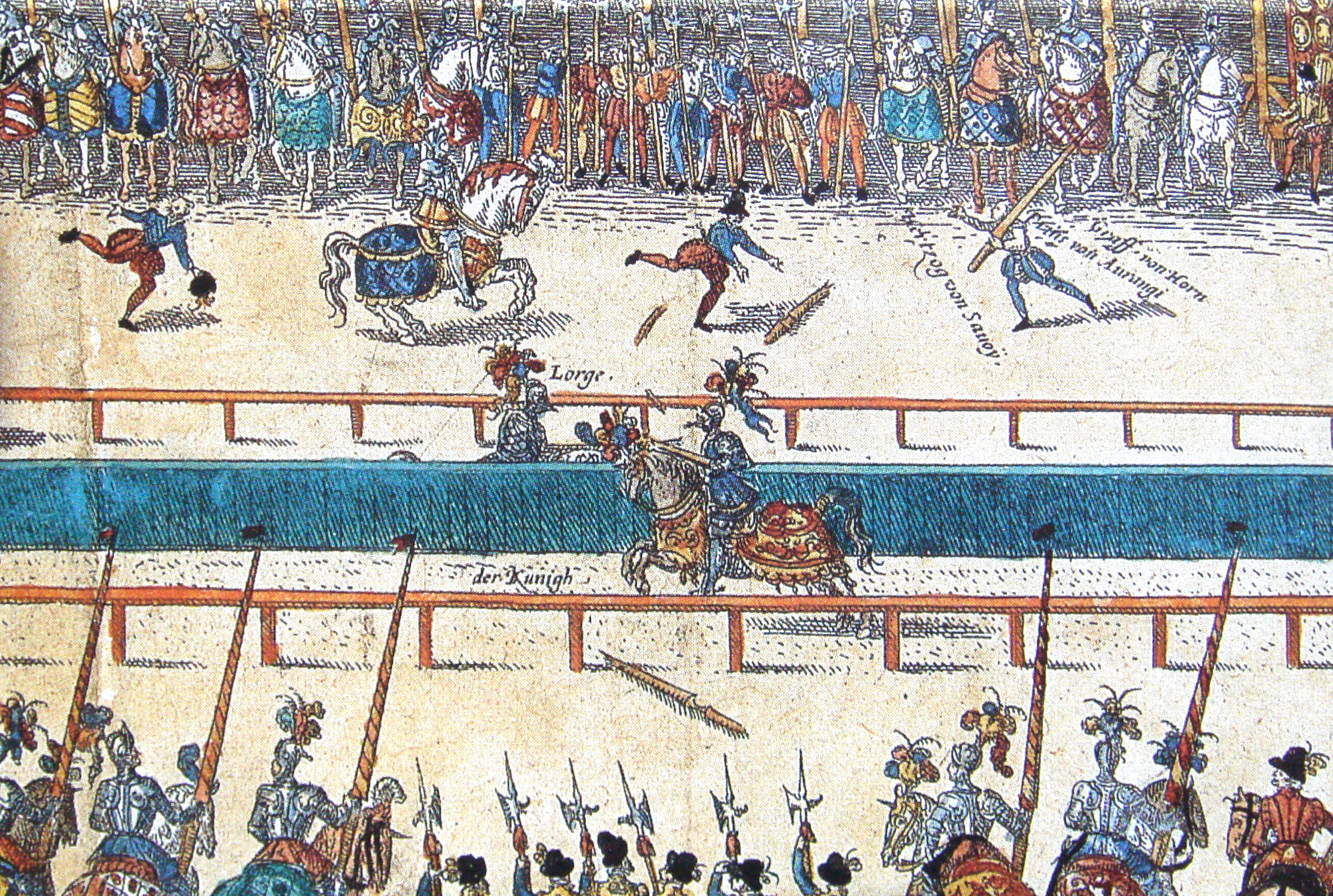
The fatal tournament between King Henry and Lord Montgomery

- June 30 – King Henry of France participates in a jousting tournament at the Place des Vosges in Paris, where French nobles are celebrating the marriage of Princess Elisabeth to King Philip of Spain. During competition against Gabriel de Lorges, Count of Montgomery, commander of King Henry's bodyguards, the Garde Écossaise, King Henry is struck in the eye by a splinter from Montgomery's lance and fatally injured. Henry survives for 10 days without treatment until dying from sepsis.

==== July–September ====
- July 10 – Francis II becomes King of France following the death of his father, Henry II. Members of the House of Guise and the new king's mother Catherine de' Medici dispute control over the kingdom.
- July 25 – The Articles of Leith are signed in Edinburgh between the Protestant Lords of the Congregation and the Roman Catholic representatives the Scottish regent, Mary of Guise, the widow of King James V, who is ruling on behalf of her daughter, the 17-year-old Mary, Queen of Scots. The Lords, who have occupied Edinburgh since June, withdraw their troops in return for the Scottish crown's agreement to not interfere with the practice of Protestantism in Scotland.
- July 31 – Pope Paul IV authorizes the creation of the University of Douai (which will later become the University of Lille).
- August 15 – Led by Don Tristán de Luna y Arellano, a Spanish missionary colony of 1,500 men, on 13 ships, arrives from Vera Cruz at Pensacola Bay, founding the oldest European settlement in the mainland U.S. (St. Augustine is founded in 1565.)
- August 18 – Pope Paul IV, leader of the Roman Catholic Church since 1555, dies at the age of 83 after a reign of four years. The office of the Pope remains vacant until almost the end of the year before a successor is chosen.
- September 4 – Gorkha state is established by Dravya Shah, beating local Khadka kings, which is the origin of the current country of Nepal.
- September 5 – The papal conclave to elect a new pope opens 18 days after the death of Pope Paul IV at the Apostolic Palace in Rome with 47 of the 55 Roman Catholic cardinals present. The conclave lasts 101 days before a successor to Pope Paul is elected.
- September 19 – Just weeks after arrival at Pensacola, the Spanish missionary colony is decimated by a hurricane that kills hundreds, sinks five ships, with a galleon, and grounds a caravel; the 1,000 survivors divide to relocate/resupply the settlement, but suffer famine & attacks, and abandon the effort in 1561.
- September 21 – Francis II of France is crowned at Reims. The crown is too heavy for him, and has to be held in place by his nobles.
- September 25 – At the age of 12, Petru cel Tânăr (Peter the Younger) is named as the new Prince of Wallachia at the capital, Târgoviște (now in Romania) after the death of his father, Mircea the Shepherd. In response, members of Wallachian nobility (boyars) opposed to Mircea's rule launch the first of three attempts to take the throne, fighting battles at Românești, Șerpătești and Boiani.

==== October–December ====
- October 24 – Backed by Ottoman Empire troops, the army of Wallachia defeats the boyars at the battle of Boiani. The Ottoman central government at Constantinople confirms Petru as the rightful ruler of the principality within the Empire.
- October 27 – Frederick III is terminated from his post as Duke of Legnica on orders of Ferdinand I, Holy Roman Emperor. The Emperor Ferdinand orders Frederick placed under house arrest, and restores Frederick's son, Henry XI as Duke of Legnica.
- November 5 – In Scotland, Crichton Castle, home of the powerful Earl of Bothwell, is besieged and captured in an attack by the Earl of Arran.
- November 6 – The Ottoman Empire ends its attempt to wrest control of the island of Bahrain from Portuguese control, after a siege of Manama Castle that began on July 2.
- December 25 – After a conclave of almost four months, Giovanni Angelo Medici is elected as the 224th pope, and takes the name Pope Pius IV.

==== Date unknown ====
- The University of Geneva is founded by John Calvin.
- John Calvin publishes the final edition of the Institutes of the Christian Religion.
- Oda Nobunaga wins control of his native province of Owari.
- Margaret of Parma becomes Governor of the Netherlands, in place of her brother, King Philip II of Spain.
- Jean Nicot, French ambassador to Portugal, introduces tobacco to the French court in the form of snuff, and describes its medicinal properties. The active ingredient in tobacco is later named "nicotine" in his honor.
- Pope Paul IV promulgates the Pauline Index, an early version of the Index Librorum Prohibitorum.
- The first generation of the Protestant Reformation is completed, according to some historians.

== Births ==
1550

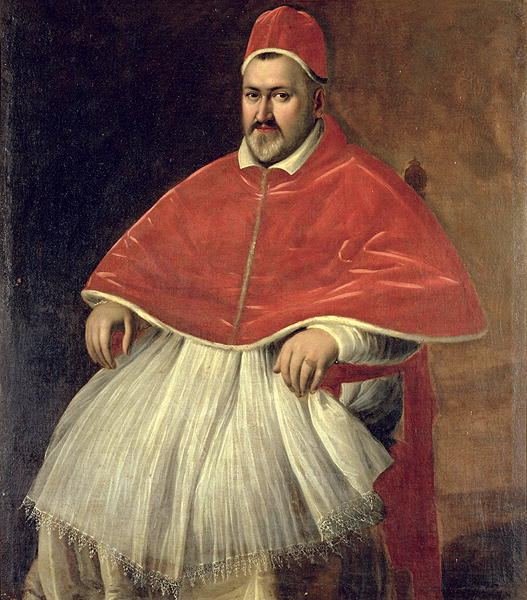
Pope Paul V

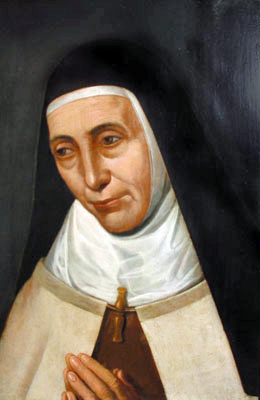
Anne of Saint Bartholomew

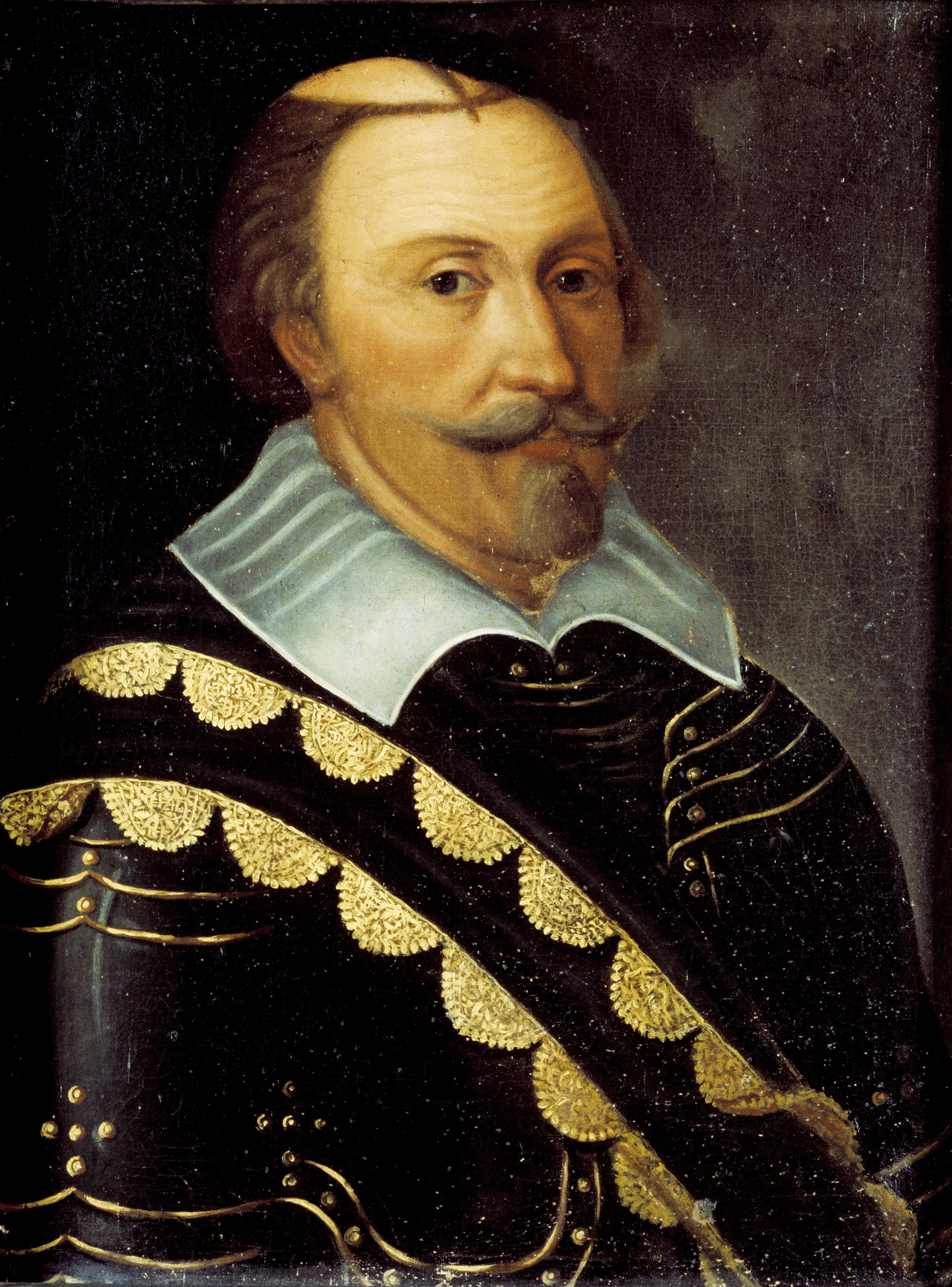
King Charles IX of Sweden

- January 18 – Tsugaru Tamenobu, Japanese daimyō (d. 1607)
- February 17 – Philip of Hohenlohe-Neuenstein, Dutch army commander (d. 1606)
- February 22 – Charles de Ligne, 2nd Prince of Arenberg (d. 1616)
- March 6 – Michelangelo Naccherino, Italian sculptor (d. 1622)
- March 8 – William Drury, English politician (d. 1590)
- April 5 – Andrés Pacheco, Spanish churchman and theologian (d. 1626)
- April 9 – Giulio Pace, Italian philosopher (d. 1635)
- April 12 – Edward de Vere, 17th Earl of Oxford, Lord Great Chamberlain of England (d. 1604)
- April 16 – Francis Anthony, English apothecary and physician (d. 1623)
- April 18 – Alessandro Pieroni, Italian painter (d. 1607)
- May 8 – John I, Count Palatine of Zweibrücken (d. 1604)
- May 25 – Camillus de Lellis, Italian saint and nurse (d. 1614)
- June 16 – Marie Eleonore of Cleves, Duchess consort of Prussia (1573–1608) (d. 1608)
- June 27 – King Charles IX of France (d. 1574)
- June 28 – Johannes van den Driesche, Flemish Protestant clergyman and scholar (d. 1616)
- July 3 – Jacobus Gallus, Slovenian composer (d. 1591)
- August 6 – Enrico Caetani, Italian Catholic cardinal (d. 1599)
- August 8 – Petrus Gudelinus, Belgian jurist (d. 1619)
- September 2 –
- September 10 – Alonso de Guzmán El Bueno, 7th Duke of Medina Sidonia, commander of the Spanish Armada (d. 1615)
- September 17 – Pope Paul V (d. 1621)
- September 29 – Joachim Frederick of Brieg, Duke of Wołów (1586–1602) (d. 1602)
- September 30 – Michael Maestlin, German astronomer and mathematician (d. 1631)
- October 1 – Anne of Saint Bartholomew, Spanish Discalced Carmelite nun (d. 1626)
- October 4 – King Charles IX of Sweden (d. 1611)
- October 8 – Antonio Zapata y Cisneros, Spanish cardinal (d. 1635)
- October 25 – Ralph Sherwin, English Roman Catholic priest (martyred 1581)
- October 28 – Stanislaus Kostka, Polish saint (d. 1568)
- November 1 – Henry of Saxe-Lauenburg, Prince-Archbishop of Bremen, Prince-Bishop of Osnabruck and Paderborn (d. 1585)
- November 6 – Karin Månsdotter, Swedish queen (d. 1612)
- December 2 – Antonio Fernández de Córdoba y Cardona, Spanish diplomat (d. 1606)
- December 6 – Orazio Vecchi, Italian composer (d. 1605)
- December 7 – Lithuanian noble Barbara Radziwiłł, wife of Sigismund II Augustus, King of Poland and Duke of Lithuania since 1547, has an elaborate coronation in Kraków as Queen consort and Grand Duchess, five months before her death at the age of 30.
- December 21
  - Aegidius Hunnius, German theologian (d. 1603)
  - Man Singh I, Mughal noble (d. 1614)
- December 22 – Cesare Cremonini, Italian philosopher (d. 1631)
- December 28 – Vicente Espinel, Spanish writer (d. 1624)
- December 28 – Abu al-Abbas Ahmad III, the Sultan of Ifriqiya (now Tunisia), signs a six-year treaty with Spain.
- December 29 – García de Silva Figueroa, Spanish diplomat and traveller (d. 1624)
- December 31 – Henry I, Duke of Guise (d. 1588)
- date unknown
  - Jacob ben Isaac Ashkenazi, Polish Jewish author (d. 1625)
  - Willem Barentsz, Dutch navigator and explorer (d. 1597)
  - Anselmus de Boodt, Belgian mineralogist and physician (d. 1632)
  - Matthijs Bril, Flemish painter (d. 1583)
  - Helena Antonia, Austrian court dwarf (d. 1595)
  - Sarsa Dengel, Emperor of Ethiopia (d. 1597)
  - Hugh O'Neill, Earl of Tyrone, Irish rebel (d. 1616)
  - John Napier, Scottish mathematician (d. 1617)
- probable
  - Robert Balfour, Scottish philosopher (d. 1625)
  - Henry Barrowe, English Puritan and Separatist (d. 1593)
  - Emilio de' Cavalieri, Italian composer (d. 1602)
  - Cornelis Corneliszoon, Dutch inventor of the sawmill (d. c. 1600)
  - Philip Henslowe, English theatrical entrepreneur (d. 1616)
  - Brianda Pereira, Azorean Portuguese heroine (d. 1620)

1551

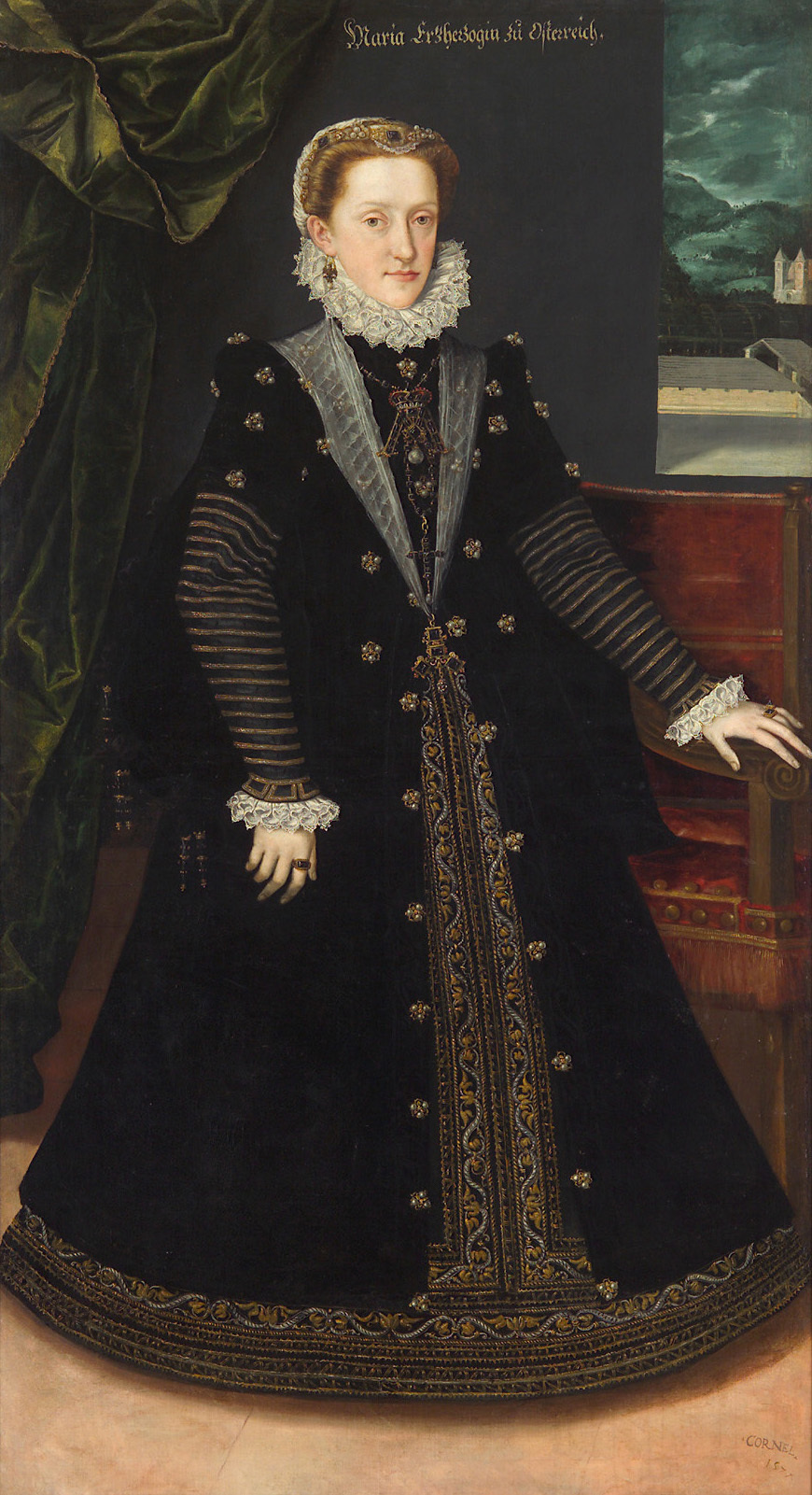
Maria Anna of Bavaria

- January 5 – Jean Chapeauville, Belgian theologian and historian (d. 1617)
- January 14 – Abu'l-Fazl ibn Mubarak, Grand vizier of the Mughal emperor Akbar (d. 1602)
- January 26 – Robert Dormer, 1st Baron Dormer, English politician (d. 1616)
- February 2 – Nicolaus Reimers, German astronomer (d. 1600)
- March 9 – Alessandro Alberti, Italian painter (d. 1596)
- March 21 – Maria Anna of Bavaria (d. 1608)
- March 30 – Salomon Schweigger, German theologian (d. 1622)
- April 9 – Peter Monau, German physician (d. 1588)
- April 30 – Jacopo da Empoli, Italian painter (d. 1640)
- May 2 – William Camden, English historian (d. 1623)
- May 8 – Thomas Drury, English government informer and swindler (d. 1603)
- May 17 – Martin Delrio, Flemish theologian and occultist (d. 1608)
- September 19 – King Henry III of France (d. 1589)
- October 4 – Philip VI, Count of Waldeck (1567–1579) (d. 1579)
- October 8 – Giulio Caccini, Italian composer (d. 1618)
- October 26 – Charlotte de Sauve, French courtesan (d. 1617)
- November 11 – Giovanni I Cornaro, Doge of Venice (d. 1629)
- date unknown
  - Bhai Gurdas – original scribe of Guru Granth Sahib
  - George Tuchet, 1st Earl of Castlehaven (d. 1617)
  - Fausto Veranzio, Dalmatian/Croatian polymath, bishop, humanist (d. 1617)
  - Job of Pochayiv, Ukrainian Christian Orthodox Saint (d. 1651)
- probable
  - Patrick Galloway, Moderator of the General Assembly of the Church of Scotland (d. c.1626)
  - Boris Godunov, Tsar of Russia (d. 1605)
  - Stanisław Stadnicki, Polish nobleman (d. 1610)

1552

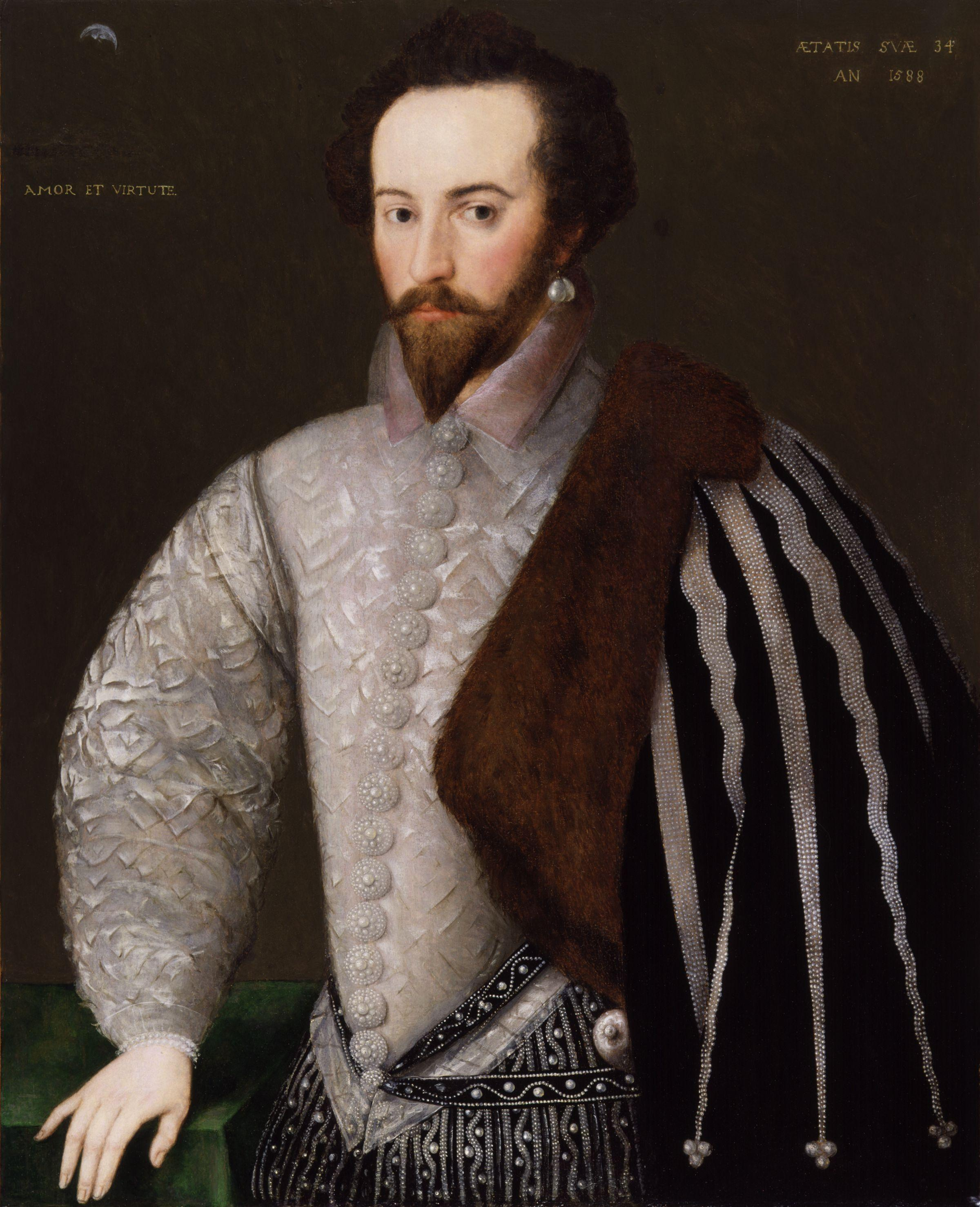
Walter Raleigh

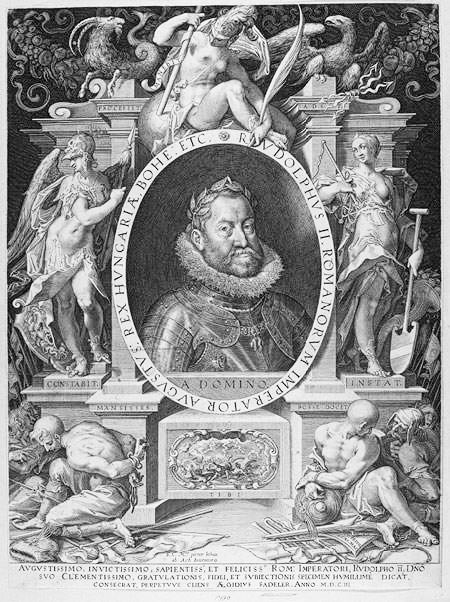
Rudolph II

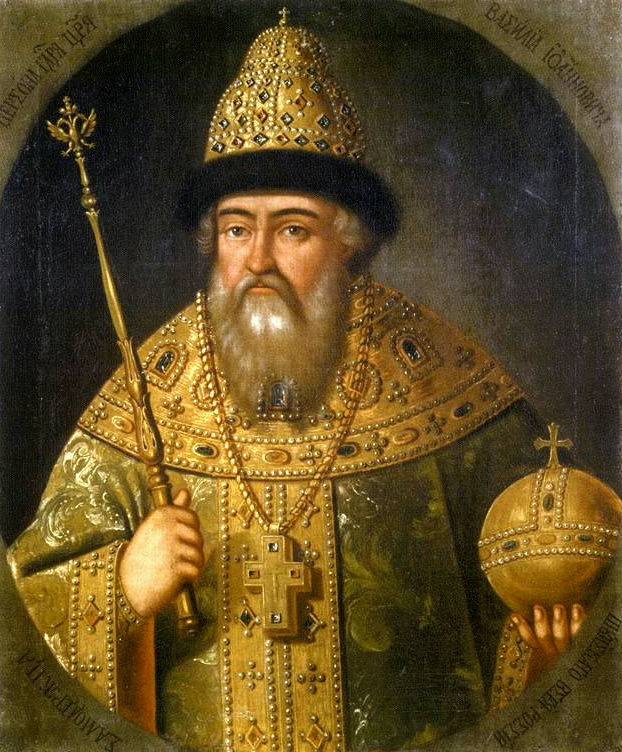
Vasili IV of Russia

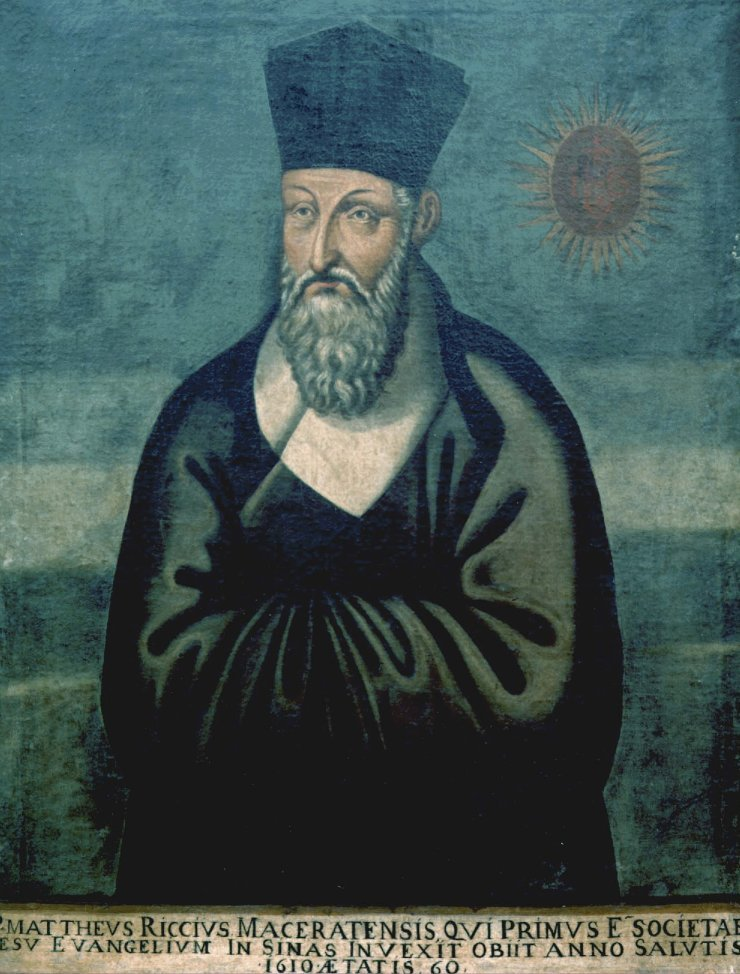
Matteo Ricci

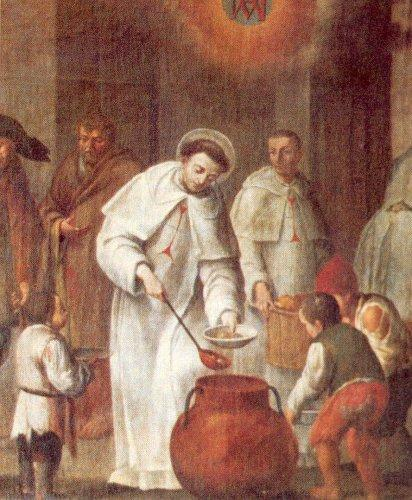
Simón de Rojas

- January 14 – Alberico Gentili, Italian jurist (d. 1608)
- January 22 – Walter Raleigh, English explorer (d. 1618)
- February 1 – Edward Coke, English colonial entrepreneur and jurist (d. 1634)
- February 8 – Agrippa d'Aubigné, French poet and soldier (d. 1630)
- February 19 – Melchior Klesl, Austrian statesman and cardinal (d. 1630)
- February 20 – Sengoku Hidehisa, Japanese daimyō (d. 1614)
- February 25 – Magdalene of Lippe, Countess of Lippe by birth, and by marriage Landgravine of Hesse-Darmstadt (d. 1587)
- February 28 – Joost Bürgi, Swiss clockmaker and mathematician (d. 1632)
- March 1 – Anna of Cleves, Duchess of Jülich-Cleves-Berg by birth and by marriage Countess Palatine of Neuburg (d. 1632)
- March 18 – Polykarp Leyser the Elder, German theologian (d. 1610)
- March 20 – Christoph, Count of Hohenzollern-Haigerloch (d. 1592)
- April 20 – Frederick IV of Liegnitz, German noble (d. 1596)
- May 8 – Petrus Ryff, Swiss scientist (d. 1629)
- May 12 – Edmund Bowyer, English politician (d. 1627)
- June 2 – Raja Wodeyar I, King of Mysore (d. 1617)
- June 8 – Gabriello Chiabrera, Italian poet (d. 1638)
- June 17 – John George of Ohlau, Duke of Oława and Wołów (1586-1592) (d. 1592)
- June 29 – Elizabeth Spencer, Baroness Hunsdon, English baroness (d. 1618)
- July 18 – Rudolf II, Holy Roman Emperor (d. 1612)
- July 22
  - Anthony Browne, Sheriff of Surrey and Kent (d. 1592)
  - Mary Wriothesley, Countess of Southampton, Lady of English peer and others (d. 1607)
- August 14 – Paolo Sarpi, Italian writer (d. 1623)
- August 21 – Muhammad Qadiri, Founder of the Naushahia branch of the Qadri order (d. 1654)
- August 24 – Lavinia Fontana, Italian painter (d. 1614)
- September 12 – Andreas Schott, Flemish academic, linguist, translator, editor and a Jesuit priest (d. 1629)
- September 20 – Lorenz Scholz von Rosenau, German botanist (d. 1599)
- September 21 – Barbara Longhi, Italian painter (d. 1638)
- September 22 – Tsar Vasili IV of Russia (d. 1612)
- September 27 – Flaminio Scala, Italian playwright and stage actor (d. 1624)
- October 6 – Matteo Ricci, Italian Jesuit missionary to China (d. 1610)
- October 11 – Tsarevich Dmitry Ivanovich of Russia, Grand Prince of Moscow (d. 1553)
- October 18
  - Elisabeth of Saxony, Countess Palatine of Simmern (d. 1590)
  - Francis Cherry, English diplomat (d. 1605)
- October 23 – Odet de Turnèbe, French dramatist (d. 1581)
- October 28 – Simón de Rojas, Spanish saint (d. 1624)
- December 18 – Ahmad Ibn al-Qadi, Moroccan writer, judge and mathematician (d. 1616)
- November 20 – Gilbert Talbot, 7th Earl of Shrewsbury, English politician and Earl (d. 1616)
- November 26 – Seonjo of Joseon, King of Joseon (d. 1608)
- December 27 – William Cavendish, 1st Earl of Devonshire, English politician and Earl (d. 1626)
- December 29 – Henri I de Bourbon, prince de Condé (d. 1588)
- December 31 – Simon Forman, English occultist and astrologer (d. 1611)
- Date unknown:
  - Hans von Aachen, German mannerist painter (d. 1615)
  - Thomas Aufield, English Catholic martyr (d. 1585)
  - Jean Bertaut, French poet (d. 1611)
  - Philemon Holland, English translator (d. 1637)
  - Prince Masahito, Japanese prince (d. 1586)
  - Lady Saigō, Japanese concubine (d. 1589)
  - Dom Justo Takayama, Japanese daimyo (d. 1615)
  - Anthony Tyrrell, Roman Catholic renegade priest and spy (d. circa 1610)
  - Jean Hotman, Marquis de Villers-St-Paul, French diplomat (d. 1636)
  - Cvijeta Zuzorić, Croatian poet (d. 1648)
- probable
  - Miguel de Benavides, Spanish clergyman and sinologist (d. 1605)
  - Francisco Goméz de Sandoval y Rojas, Duke of Lerma, Spanish politician (d. 1625)

1553

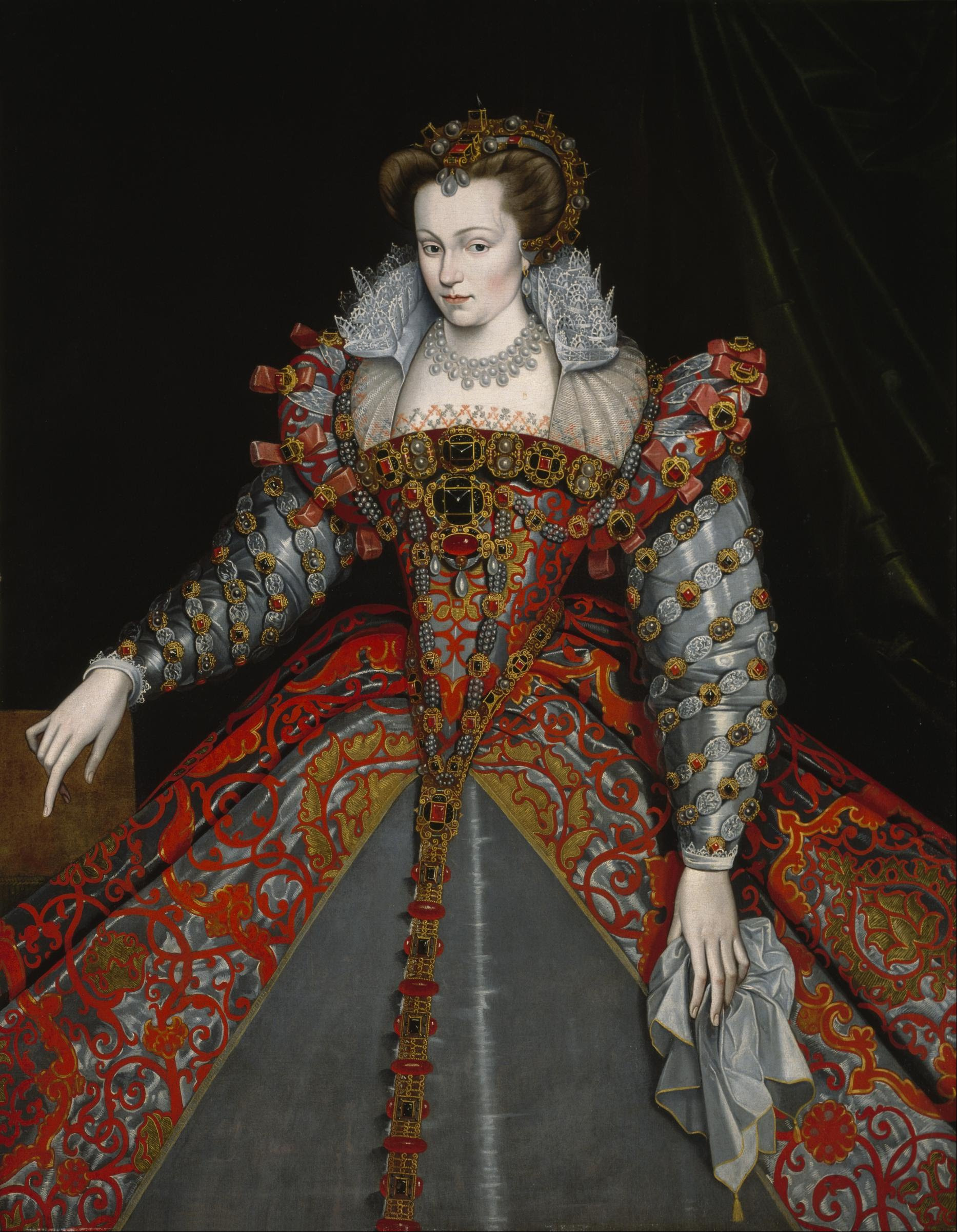
Louise of Lorraine

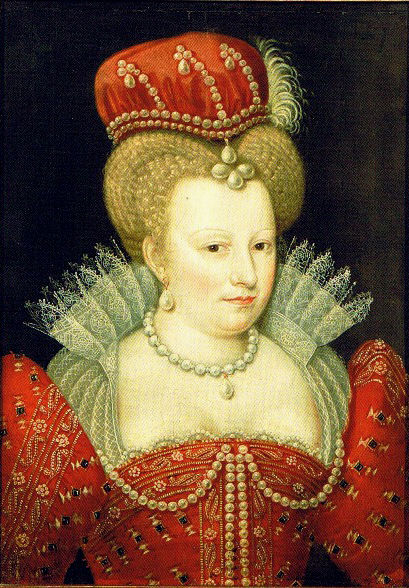
Margaret of Valois

- January 20 – Bernardino de Cárdenas y Portugal, Duque de Maqueda, Spanish noble (d. 1601)
- January 22 – Mōri Terumoto, Japanese warrior (d. 1625)
- February 24 – Cherubino Alberti, Italian engraver and painter (d. 1615)
- March – Eleonora di Garzia di Toledo, Italian noble (d. 1576)
- March 26 – Vitsentzos Kornaros, Greek writer (d. 1613)
- April 24 – John Maxwell, 8th Lord Maxwell, Scottish noble (d. 1593)
- April 30 – Louise of Lorraine, French queen consort (d. 1601)
- May 7 – Albert Frederick, Duke of Prussia (d. 1618)
- May 14 – Margaret of Valois, Queen of France (d. 1615)
- June 5 – Bernardino Baldi, Italian mathematician and writer (d. 1617)
- June 15 – Archduke Ernest of Austria, Austrian prince, the son of Maximilian II (d. 1595)
- July 1 – Peter Street, English carpenter (d. 1609)
- September 26 – Nicolò Contarini, Doge of Venice (d. 1631)
- October 8 – Jacques Auguste de Thou, French historian (d. 1617)
- October 18 – Luca Marenzio, Italian composer (d. 1599)
- November 2 – Magdalene of Jülich-Cleves-Berg, Countess Palatine of Pfalz-Zweibrücken (d. 1633)
- November 4 – Roger Wilbraham, Solicitor-General for Ireland (d. 1616)
- November 23 – Prospero Alpini, Italian physician and botanist (d. 1617)
- November 28 – George More, English politician (d. 1632)
- December 13 – King Henry IV of France (d. 1610)
- date unknown
  - Patriarch Filaret of Moscow and All Rus' (d. 1633)
  - Giovanni Florio, English writer and translator (d. 1625)
  - Richard Hakluyt, English travel writer (d. 1616)
  - Robert Hues, English mathematician and geographer (d. 1632)
  - Amago Katsuhisa, Japanese nobleman (d. 1578)
  - Pierre de Rostegny, French jurist (d. 1631)
  - William Russell, 1st Baron Russell of Thornhaugh, Spanish military leader (d. 1613)
  - Moses Székely, Hungarian noble (d. 1603)
  - Beatrice Michiel, Venetian spy (d. 1613)
  - Mirza Muhammad Hakim, son of Mughal emperor Humayun and brother of emperor Akbar (d. 1585)

1554

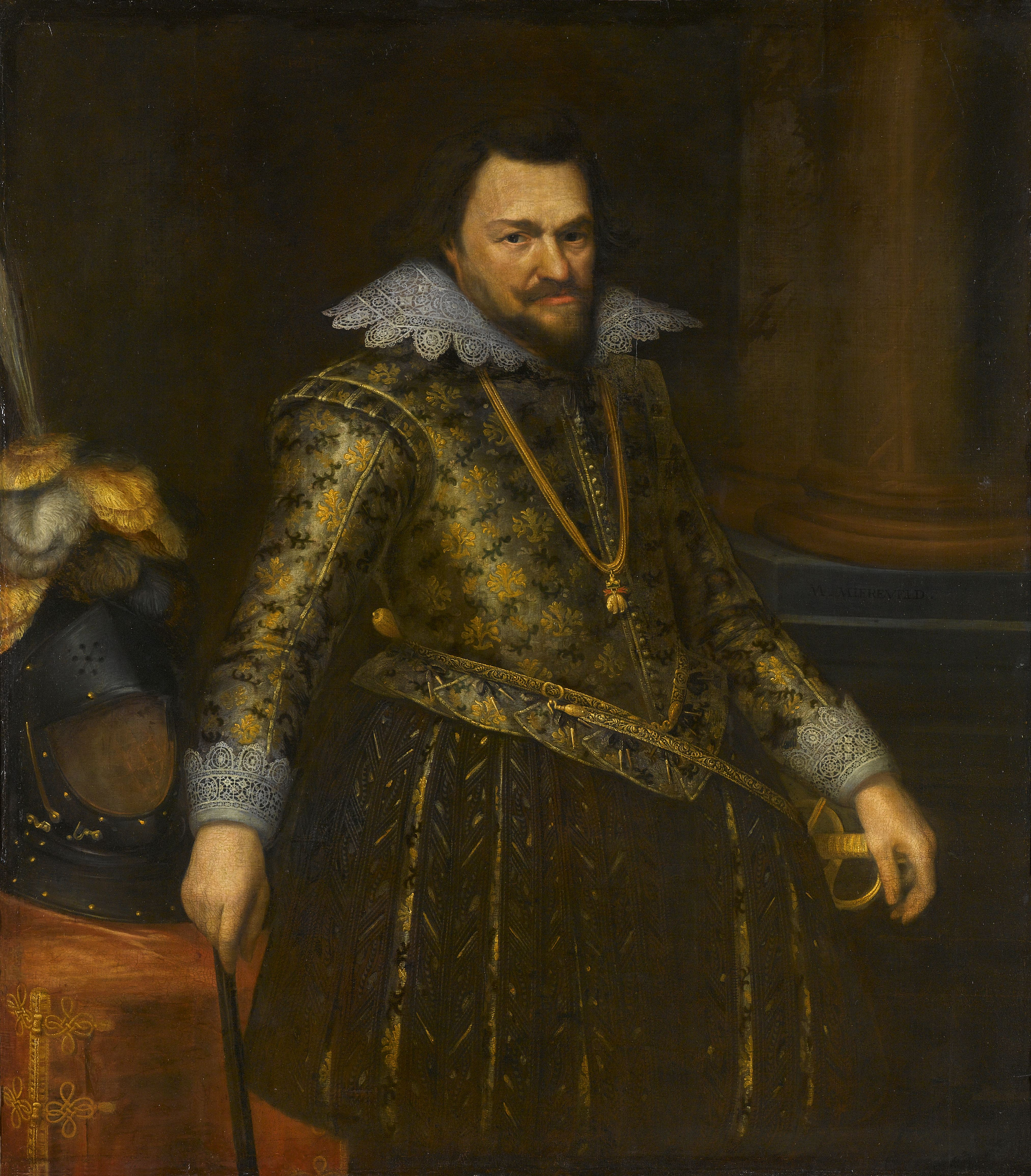
Philip William, Prince of Orange

- January 1 – Louis III, Duke of Württemberg (d. 1593)
- January 9 – Pope Gregory XV (d. 1623)
- January 20 – King Sebastian of Portugal (d. 1578)
- February 8 – Marina de Escobar, Spanish nun (d. 1633)
- February 27 – Giovanni Battista Paggi, Italian painter (d. 1627)
- March – Richard Hooker, Anglican theologian (d. 1600)
- March 1 – William Stafford, English courtier and conspirator (d. 1612)
- March 18 – Josias I, Count of Waldeck-Eisenberg, Count of Waldeck-Eisenberg (1578-1588) (d. 1588)
- March 22 – Catherine de Parthenay, French noblewoman and mathematician (d. 1631)
- March 26 – Charles of Lorraine, Duke of Mayenne, French military leader (d. 1611)
- March 28 – Tsarevich Ivan Ivanovich of Russia (d. 1581)
- March 30 – Paul Laurentius, German divine (d. 1624)
- April – Stephen Gosson, English satirist (d. 1624)
- April 15 – Simon VI, Count of Lippe, Count of Lippe-Detmold (1563-1613) (d. 1613)
- May 20 – Paolo Bellasio, Italian composer (d. 1594)
- June 3 – Pietro de' Medici, Italian noble (d. 1604)
- June 5 – Benedetto Giustiniani, Italian Catholic cardinal (d. 1621)
- June 21 – Joachim of Zollern, Titular Count of Hohenzollern (d. 1587)
- July 5 – Elisabeth of Austria, Queen of France (d. 1592)
- October 1 – Leonardus Lessius, Jesuit theologian (d. 1623)
- October 3 – Fulke Greville, 1st Baron Brooke, English poet (d. 1628)
- October 10 – Arnold III, Count of Bentheim-Steinfurt-Tecklenburg-Limburg and Lord of Rheda (d. 1606)
- October 20 – Bálint Balassi, Hungarian writer and noble (d. 1594)
- October 28 – Enevold Kruse, Danish noble (d. 1621)
- October 30 – Prospero Farinacci, Italian jurist (d. 1618)
- November 30 – Sir Philip Sidney, English courtier and poet (d. 1586)
- December 17 – Ernest of Bavaria, Roman Catholic bishop (d. 1612)
- December 19 – Philip William, Prince of Orange (d. 1618)
- date unknown
  - Jacques Bongars, French scholar and diplomat (d. 1612)
  - James Lancaster, English navigator (d. 1618)
  - Walter Raleigh, English writer, poet, and explorer (d. 1618)
  - Francis Throckmorton, English conspirator (d. 1584)

1555

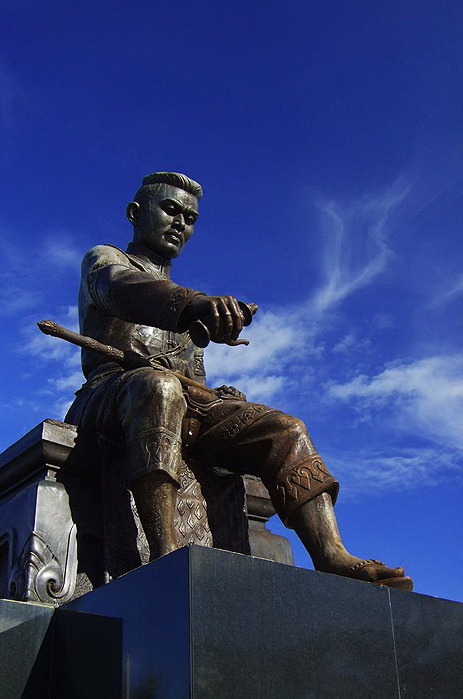
King Naresuan

- January 26 – Charles II, Lord of Monaco (d. 1589)
- February 25 – Alonso Lobo, Spanish musician (d. 1617)
- March 18 – François, Duke of Anjou, youngest son of Henry II of France and Catherine de' Medici (d. 1584)
- March 21 – John Leveson, English politician (d. 1615)
- March 31 – Elizabeth Stuart, Countess of Lennox, English countess (d. 1582)
- April 21 – Ludovico Carracci, Italian painter (d. 1619)
- April 28 – Karl Friedrich of Jülich-Cleves-Berg, heir apparent of Jülich-Cleves-Berg (d. 1575)
- May 5 – Queen Uiin, Korean royal consort (d. 1600)
- May 9 – Jerónima de la Asunción, founder of the first Catholic monastery in Manila, the Monastery of Santa Clara (d. 1630)
- May 29 – George Carew, 1st Earl of Totnes, English earl, general and administrator (d. 1629)
- June 11 – Lodovico Zacconi, Italian composer and music theorist (d. 1627)
- June 13 – Giovanni Antonio Magini, Italian mathematician, cartographer and astronomer (d. 1617)
- June 16 – Duke Otto Henry of Brunswick-Harburg, Hereditary Prince of Brunswick-Lüneburg-Harburg (d. 1591)
- July – Henry Garnet, English Jesuit (d. 1606)
- July 6 – Louis II, Cardinal of Guise, French Catholic cardinal (d. 1588)
- July 17 – Richard Carew, English scholar (d. 1620)
- August 1 – Edward Kelley, English spirit medium (d. 1597)
- September 3 – Jan Zbigniew Ossoliński, Polish nobleman (d. 1628)
- September 21 – John Thynne, English landowner and politician (d. 1604)
- September 23 – Louise de Coligny, princess consort of Orange (d. 1620)
- September 28 – Henri de La Tour d'Auvergne, vicomte de Turenne, duc de Bouillon, Marshal of France (d. 1623)
- October 6 – Ferenc Nádasdy, Hungarian noble (d. 1604)
- October 12 – Peregrine Bertie, 13th Baron Willoughby de Eresby, English baron (d. 1601)
- November 8 – Nyaungyan Min, king of Burma (d. 1605)
- December 4 – Heinrich Meibom, German historian and poet (d. 1625)
- December 27 – Johann Arndt, German Lutheran theologian (d. 1621)
- date unknown
  - Lancelot Andrewes, English clergyman and scholar (d. 1626)
  - Adam Sędziwój Czarnkowski, Polish nobleman (d. 1628)
  - Samuel Eidels, Polish Jewish rabbi and Talmudist (d. 1631)
  - Joshua Falk, Polish Jewish rabbi and commentator (d. 1614)
  - Elijah Loans, German Jewish rabbi and kabbalist (d. 1636)
  - François de Malherbe, French poet (d. 1628)
  - Okudaira Sadamasa, Japanese nobleman (d. 1615)
  - Konishi Yukinaga, Japanese Christian daimyō (d. 1600)
  - Moderata Fonte, Italian poet, writer and philosopher (d. 1592)
  - Maria van Schooten, Dutch war heroine (d. 1573)
  - Naresuan, King of Ayutthaya (d. 1605)

1556

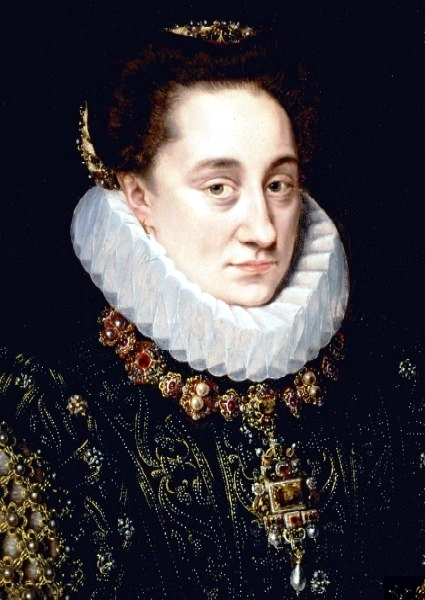
Countess Maria of Nassau

- January 8 – Uesugi Kagekatsu, Japanese samurai and warlord (d. 1623)
- January 24 – Christian Barnekow, Danish noble, explorer and diplomat (d. 1612)
- February 4 – Dorothea of Hanau-Münzenberg, German noblewoman (d. 1638)
- February 7 – Countess Maria of Nassau (d. 1616)
- February 16 – Tōdō Takatora, Japanese daimyō (d. 1630)
- February 21 – Sethus Calvisius, German calendar reformer (d. 1615)
- March 7 – Guillaume du Vair, French statesman and philosopher (d. 1621)
- March 13 – Dirck van Os, Dutch merchant (d. 1615)
- April 8 – David Hoeschel, German librarian (d. 1617)
- April 9 – Andreas von Auersperg, Carniolan noble and military commander in the battle of Sisak (d. 1593)
- April 27 – François Béroalde de Verville, French writer (d. 1626)
- May 31 – Jerzy Radziwiłł, Polish Catholic cardinal (d. 1600)
- June 6 – Edward la Zouche, 11th Baron Zouche, English politician and diplomat (d. 1625)
- June 13 – Pomponio Nenna, Italian composer (d. 1608)
- June 24
  - Victoria of Valois, French princess (d. 1556)
  - Joan of Valois, French princess (d. 1556)
- July 9 – Elizabeth Finch, 1st Countess of Winchilsea, English countess (d. 1634)
- July 22 – Otto Henry, Count Palatine of Sulzbach (d. 1604)
- July 26 – James Melville, Scottish divine and reformer (d. 1614)
- August 10 – Philipp Nicolai, German Lutheran pastor (d. 1608)
- August 16 – Bartolomeo Cesi, Italian painter (d. 1629)
- September 21 – William Harris, English knight (d. 1616)
- October 18
  - Charles I, Duke of Elbeuf, French duke and nobleman (d. 1605)
  - John Dormer, English Member of Parliament (d. 1626)
- October 24 – Giovanni Battista Caccini, Italian artist (d. 1613)
- October 26 – Ahmad Baba al Massufi, Malian academic (d. 1627)
- November 25 – Jacques Davy Duperron, French cardinal (d. 1618)
- November 28 – Francesco Contarini, Doge of Venice (d. 1624)
- December 5 – Anne Cecil, Countess of Oxford, English countess (d. 1588)
- December 17 – Abdul Rahim Khan-I-Khana, Indian composer (d. 1627)
- December 27 – Jeanne de Lestonnac, French saint (d. 1640)
- date unknown
  - Margaret Clitherow, English Catholic martyr (d. 1586)
  - Ahmad Baba al Massufi, Sudanese writer and political leader (d. 1627)
  - Alexander Briant, English Jesuit martyr (d. 1581)

1557

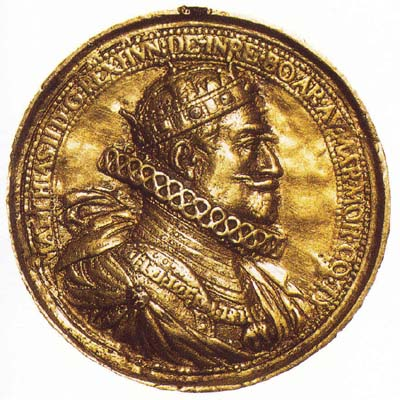
Matthias, Holy Roman Emperor

- January 1 – Stephen Bocskay, Prince of Transylvania (d. 1606)
- February 11 – Johannes Wtenbogaert, Leader of the Remonstrants (d. 1644)
- February 15
  - Alfonso Fontanelli, Italian composer (d. 1622)
  - Vittoria Accoramboni, Italian noblewoman (d. 1585)
- February 24 – Mathias, Holy Roman Emperor (d. 1619)
- March 1 – Anne Howard, Countess of Arundel, English countess and poet (d. 1630)
- March 22 – Casimir VI, Duke of Pomerania and Lutheran Administrator of Cammin Prince-Bishopric (d. 1605)
- April 4 – Lew Sapieha, Polish-Lithuanian noble (d. 1633)
- April 11 – Frederick, Count Palatine of Zweibrücken-Vohenstrauss-Parkstein (d. 1597)
- May 5 – Emanuel Philibert de Lalaing, Belgian noble and army commander (d. 1590)
- May 31 – Tsar Feodor I of Russia (d. 1598)
- June 28 – Philip Howard, 20th Earl of Arundel, English nobleman (d. 1595)
- August 2 – At Colchester in England, 10 convicted Protestant heretics are burned at the stake.
- August 16 – Agostino Carracci, Italian painter and graphical artist (d. 1602)
- August 19 – Frederick I, Duke of Württemberg (d. 1608)
- August 26 – Sibylle of Jülich-Cleves-Berg, Duchess of Jülich-Cleves-Berg by birth and by marriage Margravine of Burgau (d. 1628)
- September 4 – Sophie of Mecklenburg-Güstrow, Danish-Norwegian royal consort (d. 1631)
- September 11 – Joseph Calasanz, Spanish priest and founder of Piarists (d. 1648)
- September 16 – Jacques Mauduit, French composer (d. 1627)
- October 5 – Antoine Favre, Savoisian lawyer, first President of the Sovereign Senate of Savoy (d. 1624)
- date unknown
  - Giovanni Croce, Italian composer (d. 1609)
  - Balthasar Gérard, assassin of William I of Orange (d. 1584)
  - Toda Katsushige, Japanese warlord (d. 1600)
  - Olaus Martini, Archbishop of Uppsala (d. 1609)
  - Thomas Morley, English composer (d. 1602)
  - Oda Nobutada, Japanese general (d. 1582)
- probable – Giovanni Gabrieli, Italian composer and organist (d. 1612)

1558

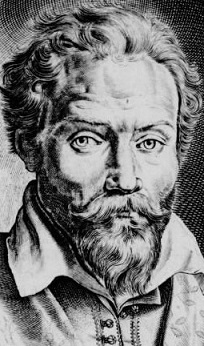
André du Laurens

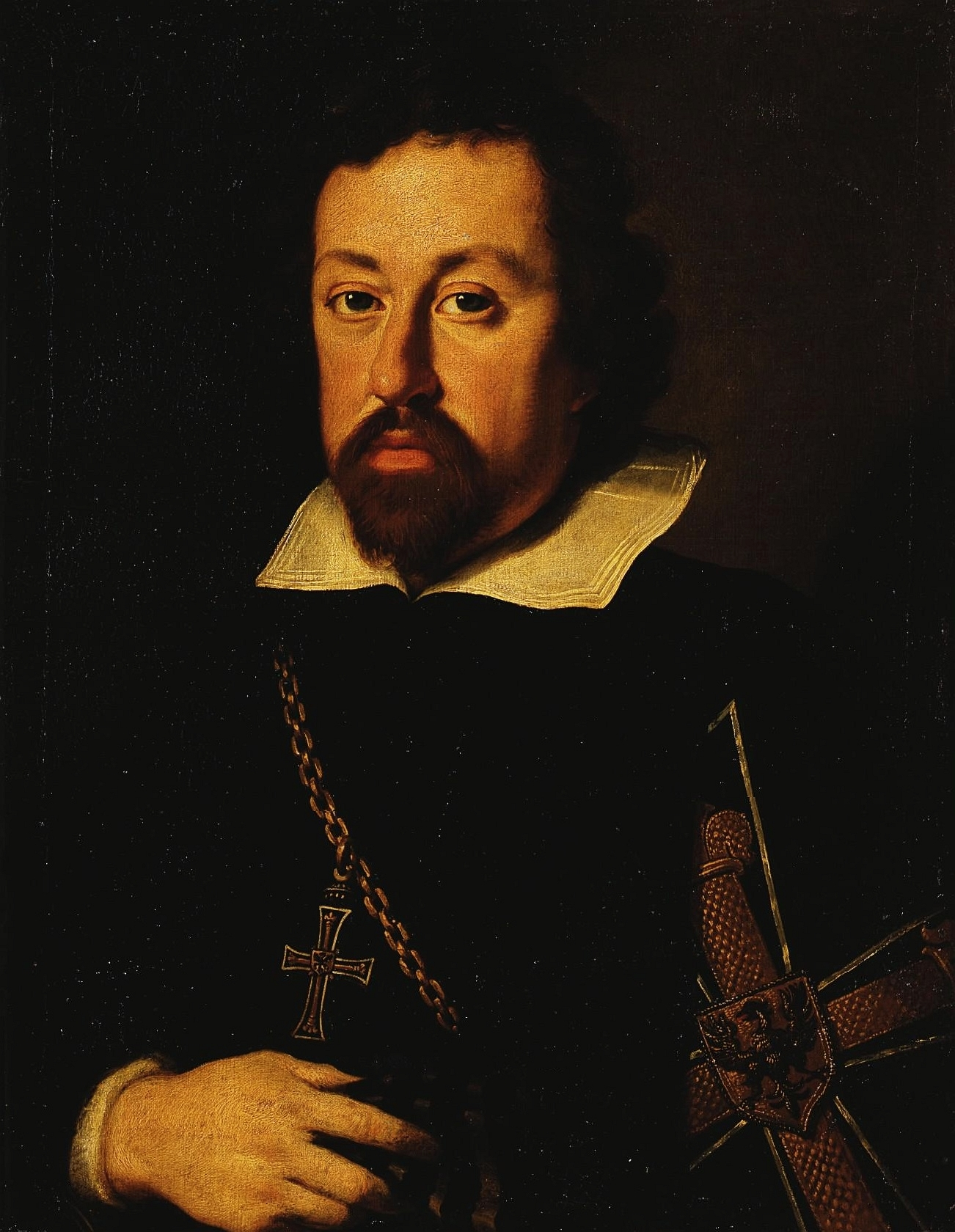
Maximilian III, Archduke of Austria

- January or February – Hendrik Goltzius, Dutch painter (d. 1617)
- January 16 – Jakobea of Baden, Margravine of Baden by birth, Duchess of Jülich-Cleves-Berg by marriage (d. 1597)
- January 29 – Paul Hentzner, German lawyer (d. 1623)
- March 7 – Johann VII, Duke of Mecklenburg, Duke of Mecklenburg-Schwerin (1576–1592) (d. 1592)
- April 30 – Mikołaj Oleśnicki the younger, Polish noble (d. 1629)
- June 15 – Margrave Andrew of Burgau, German nobleman, Cardinal, Bishop of Constance and Brixen (d. 1600)
- July 9 – David Origanus, German astronomer (d. 1628)
- July 11 – Robert Greene, English dramatist (d. 1592)
- August 2 – Herman van den Bergh, Dutch soldier in the Eighty Years' War (d. 1611)
- August 8 – George Clifford, 3rd Earl of Cumberland, English noble (d. 1605)
- August 19 – François de Bourbon, Prince of Conti (d. 1614)
- September 9 – Philippe Emmanuel, Duke of Mercœur, French soldier (d. 1602)
- September 24 – Ralph Eure, 3rd Baron Eure, English politician (d. 1617)
- October 12 – Maximilian III, Archduke of Austria (d. 1618)
- October 24 – Szymon Szymonowic, Polish writer (d. 1629)
- October 30 – Jacques-Nompar de Caumont, duc de La Force, Marshal of France (d. 1652)
- November 27 – Mingyi Swa, Crown Prince of Burma (d. 1593)
- December 3 – Gregorio Pagani, Italian painter (d. 1605)
- December 8 – François de La Rochefoucauld, French Catholic cardinal (d. 1645)
- December 9 – André du Laurens, French physician (d. 1609)
- date unknown
  - Meir Lublin, Polish rabbi (d. 1616)
  - Kōriki Masanaga, Japanese military commander (d. 1599)
  - Bessho Nagaharu, Japanese nobleman (d. 1580)
  - Olivier van Noort, first Dutchman to circumnavigate the world (d. 1627)
  - Chidiock Tichborne, English conspirator and poet (d. 1586)
  - Michael the Brave, Prince of Wallachia (1593–1601) (d. 1601)
  - Thomas Kyd, English playwright (d. 1594)
  - Françoise de Cezelli, French war hero (d. 1615)
- probable – Pierre Dugua, Sieur de Mons, French merchant (d. 1628)

1559

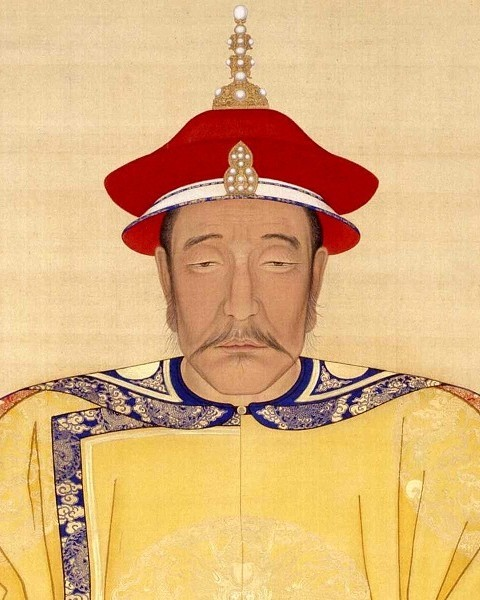
Emperor Nurhaci born on February 19

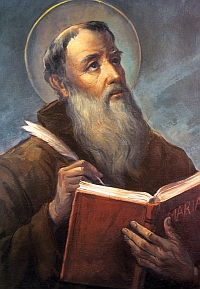
Lawrence of Brindisi born on July 22

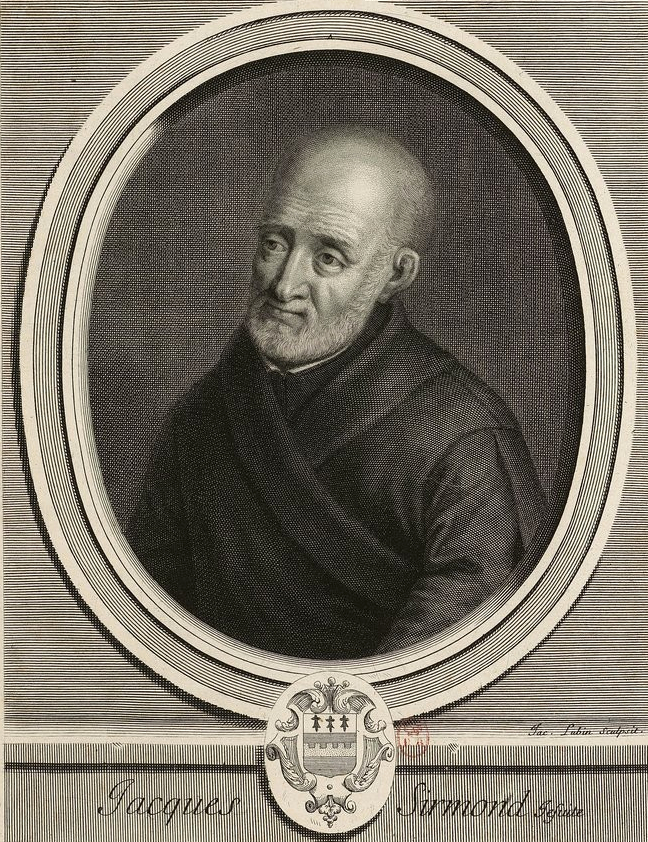
Jacques Sirmond born on October 12

- January 1 – Virginia Eriksdotter, Swedish noble (d. 1633)
- January 8 – William Helyar, English chaplain (d. 1645)
- January 25 – Aleixo de Menezes, Roman Catholic archbishop (d. 1617)
- February 7 – Catherine de Bourbon, Princess of Navarre and Duchess consort of Lorraine (d. 1604)
- February 18 – Isaac Casaubon, French-born classical scholar (d. 1614)
- February 19 – Philip II, Margrave of Baden-Baden (d. 1588)
- February 21 – Nurhaci, Chinese emperor (d. 1626)
- March 12 – Christoph Brouwer, Dutch historian (d. 1617)
- March 16 – Amar Singh I, eldest son and successor of Maharana Pratap of Mewar (d. 1620)
- March 26 – Wolf Dietrich Raitenau, Prince-Bishop of Salzburg (d. 1617)
- May 4 – Alice Spencer, Countess of Derby, Baroness Ellesmere and Viscountess Brackley (d. 1637)
- May 12
  - Stanisław Radziwiłł, Grand Marshal of Lithuania (d. 1599)
  - Johann Georg Gödelmann, German demonologist (d. 1611)
- July 2 – Margareta Brahe, Swedish political activist (d. 1638)
- July 22 – Lawrence of Brindisi, Italian saint (d. 1619)
- July 27 – Countess Palatine Barbara of Zweibrücken-Neuburg and Countess consort of Oettingen-Oettingen (d. 1618)
- August 18 – Frederik van den Bergh, Dutch soldier in the Eighty Years' War (d. 1618)
- August 24 or September 1556 – Sophia Brahe, Danish astronomer, horticulturalist (d. 1643)
- September 21 – Cigoli, Italian painter (d. 1613)
- September 15 – Edmond Richer, French theologian (d. 1631)
- October 12 or October 22 – Jacques Sirmond, French Jesuit scholar (d. 1651)
- November 11 – Tokuhime, Japanese noble (d. 1636)
- November 12 – Yaza Datu Kalaya, Crown Princess of Burma (d. 1603)
- November 13 – Al-Mansur al-Qasim, Imam of Yemen (d. 1620)
- November 15 – Albert VII, Archduke of Austria, Governor of the Low Countries (d. 1621)
- December 14 – Lupercio Leonardo de Argensola, Spanish writer (d. 1613)
- date unknown
  - George Chapman, English dramatist (d. 1634)
  - Ikeda Motosuke, Japanese military commander (d. 1584)
  - John Penry, Welsh Protestant martyr (d. 1593)
  - Honinbo Sansa, Japanese player of Go (d. 1623)
  - John Spenser, president of Corpus Christi College, Oxford (d. 1614)

== Deaths ==
1550

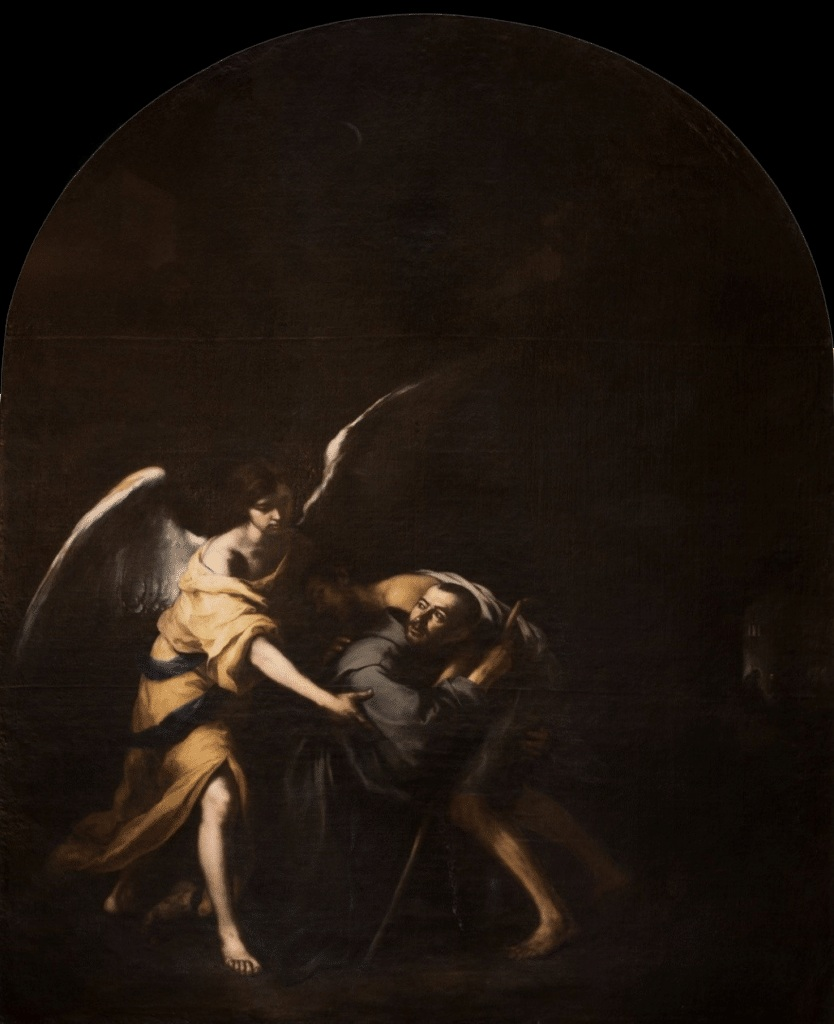
Saint John of God

- January 12 – Andrea Alciato, Italian jurist and writer (b. 1492)
- January 22 – Jamsheed Quli Qutb Shah, second ruler of Golconda
- January 28 – Magnus III of Mecklenburg-Schwerin, Lutheran administrator of the Prince-Bishopric of Schwerin (b. 1509)
- February 22 – Francesco III Gonzaga, Duke of Mantua (b. 1533)
- March 7 – William IV, Duke of Bavaria (b. 1493)
- March 8 – John of God, Spanish friar and saint (b. 1495)
- April 12 – Claude, Duke of Guise, French soldier (b. 1496)
- April 13 – Innocenzo Cybo, Italian Catholic cardinal (b. 1491)
- April 30 – King Tabinshwehti of Burma (b. 1516)
- May 18 – Jean, Cardinal of Lorraine, French churchman (b. 1498)
- May 20 – Ashikaga Yoshiharu, Japanese shōgun (b. 1511)
- June 13 – Veronica Gambara, Italian poet (b. 1485)
- July 19 (probable date) – Jacopo Bonfadio, Italian historian, executed (b. c. 1508)
- July 22 – Jorge de Lencastre, Duke of Coimbra (b. 1481)
- July 30 – Thomas Wriothesley, 1st Earl of Southampton, English politician (b. 1505)
- August 18 – Antonio Ferramolino, Italian architect and military engineer
- October 20 – Ferdinand, Duke of Calabria (b. 1488)
- October 23 – Tiedemann Giese, Polish Catholic bishop (b. 1480)
- October 24 – Louis of Valois, French prince (b. 1549)
- October 26 – Samuel Maciejowski, Polish Catholic bishop (b. 1499)
- November 6 – Ulrich, Duke of Württemberg (b. 1487)
- November 7 – Jón Arason, last Catholic bishop of Iceland (b. 1484)
- December 6 – Pieter Coecke van Aelst, Flemish painter (b. 1502)
- December 8 – Gian Giorgio Trissino, Italian humanist, poet, dramatist and diplomat (b. 1478)
- December 29 – Bhuvanaikabahu VII, King of Kotte (b. 1468)
- date unknown – Aq Kubek of Astrakhan, ruler of Astrakhan Khanate

1551

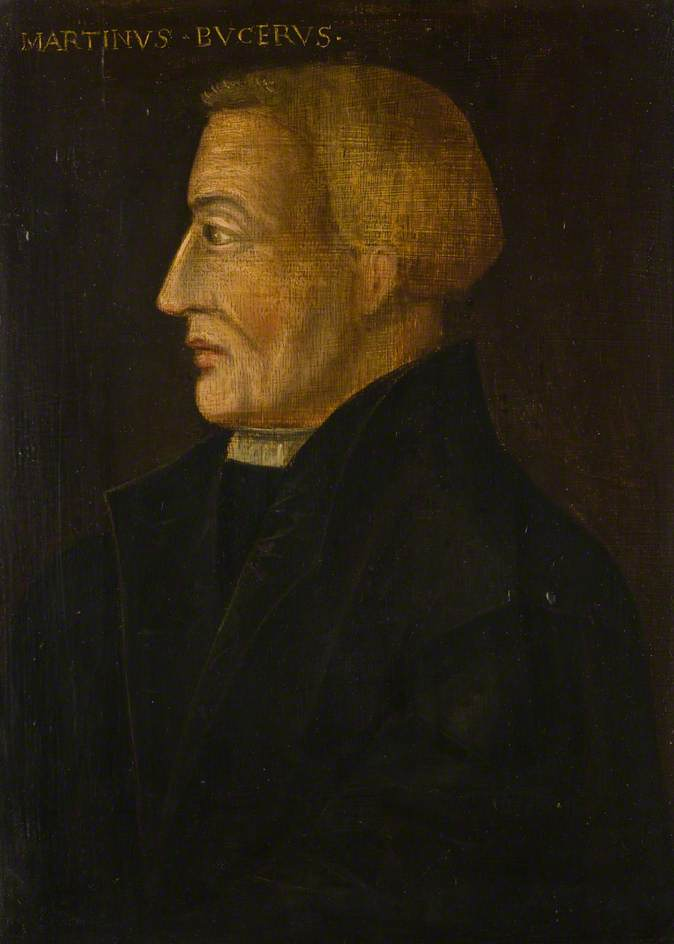
Martin Bucer

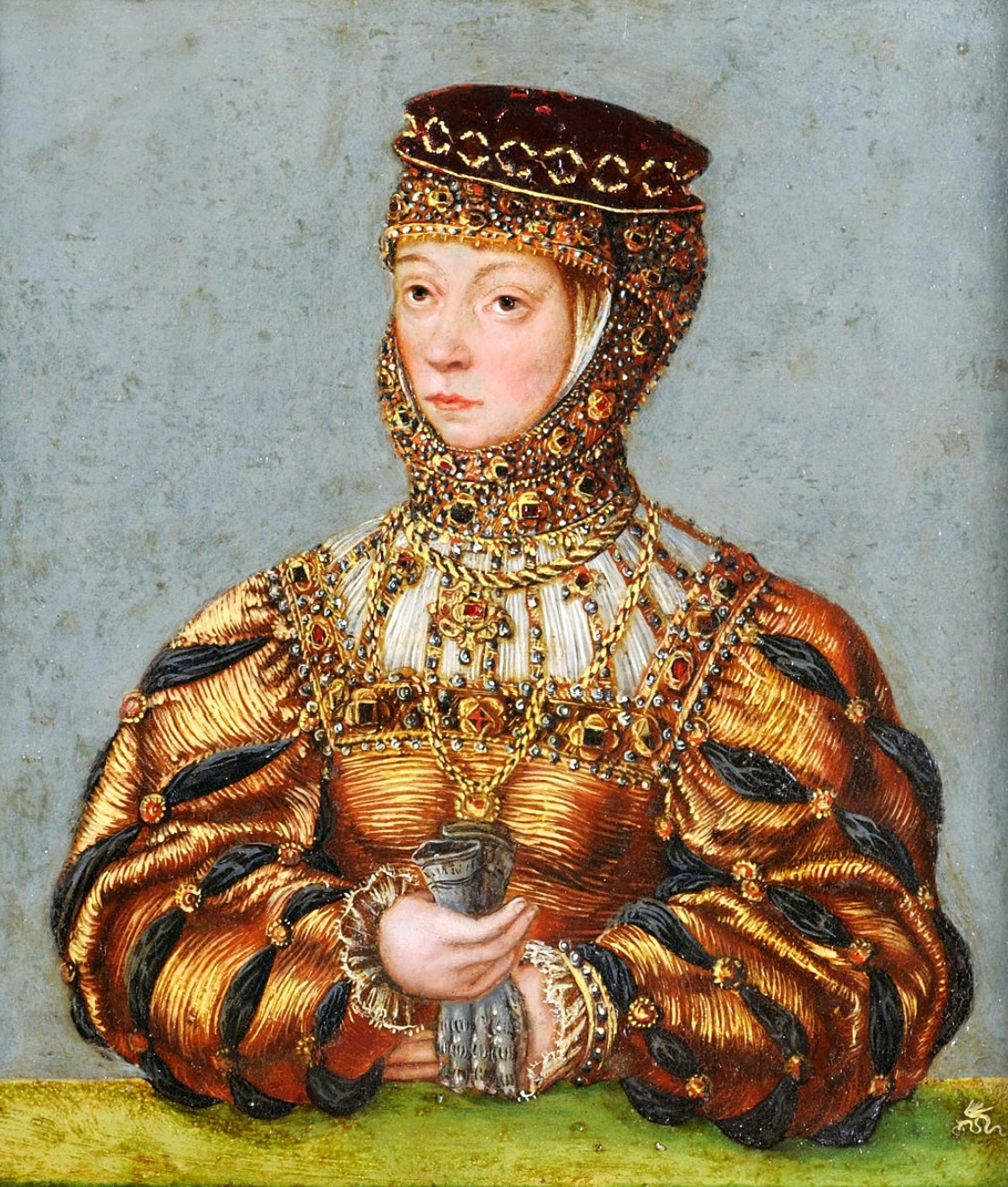
Barbara Radziwiłł

- February 4 – John V, Prince of Anhalt-Zerbst, Prince of Anahlt-Dessau (1516–1544) and Anhalt-Zerbst (1544–1551) (b. 1504)
- February 28 – Martin Bucer, German Protestant reformer (b. 1491)
- April 6 – Joachim Vadian, Swiss humanist (b. 1484)
- April 8 – Oda Nobuhide, Japanese warlord (b. 1510)
- May 8 – Barbara Radziwiłł, queen of Sigismund II of Poland (b. 1523)
- May 17 – Shin Saimdang, Korean artist, calligrapher and writer (b. 1504)
- May 18 – Domenico di Pace Beccafumi, Italian painter (b. 1486)
- June 24 – Charles II de Croÿ, Belgian duke (b. 1522)
- July – Adriaen Isenbrandt, Flemish painter (b. 1490)
- July 13 – John Wallop, English soldier and diplomat (b. 1490)
- July 14 – Henry Brandon, 2nd Duke of Suffolk (b. 1535)
- August 8 – Fray Tomás de Berlanga, Bishop of Panama (b. 1487)
- August 12 – Paul Speratus, German Lutheran (b. 1484)
- August 26 – Margaret Leijonhufvud, queen of Gustav I of Sweden (b. 1516)
- September 30 – Ōuchi Yoshitaka, Japanese warlord (b. 1507)
- November 20 – Hindal Mirza, Mughal Empire emperor (b. 1519)
- date unknown
  - Sagara Taketō, Japanese samurai (b. 1498)
  - Helena Ungler, Polish printer
  - Alice Arden, English murderer (b. 1516; executed by burning)

1552

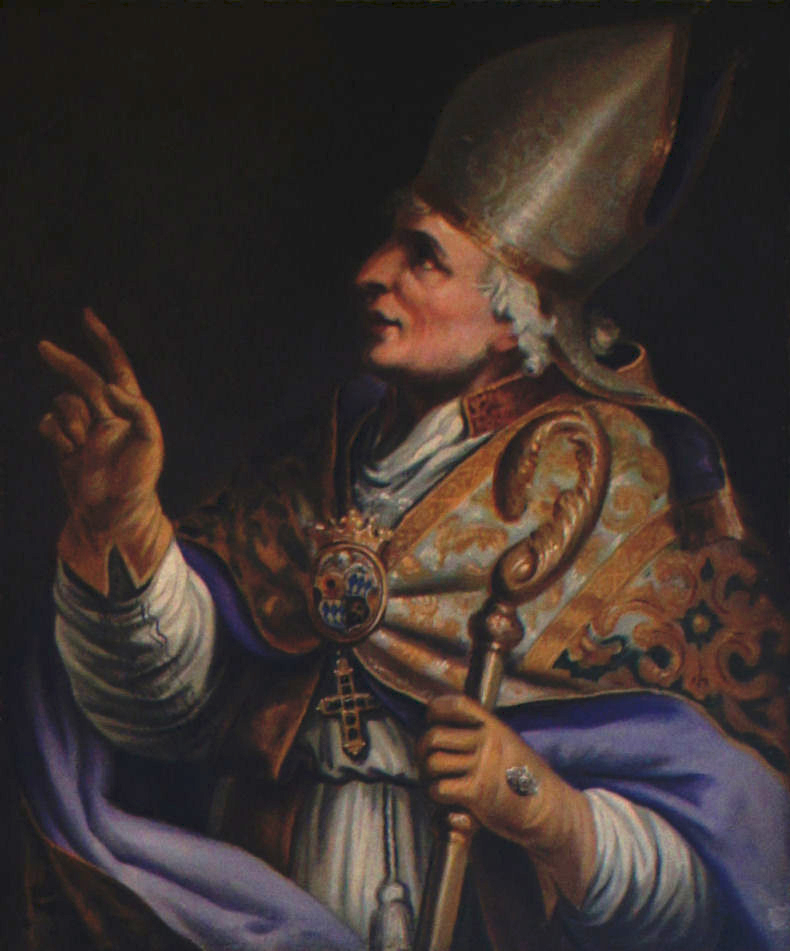
Henry of the Palatinate

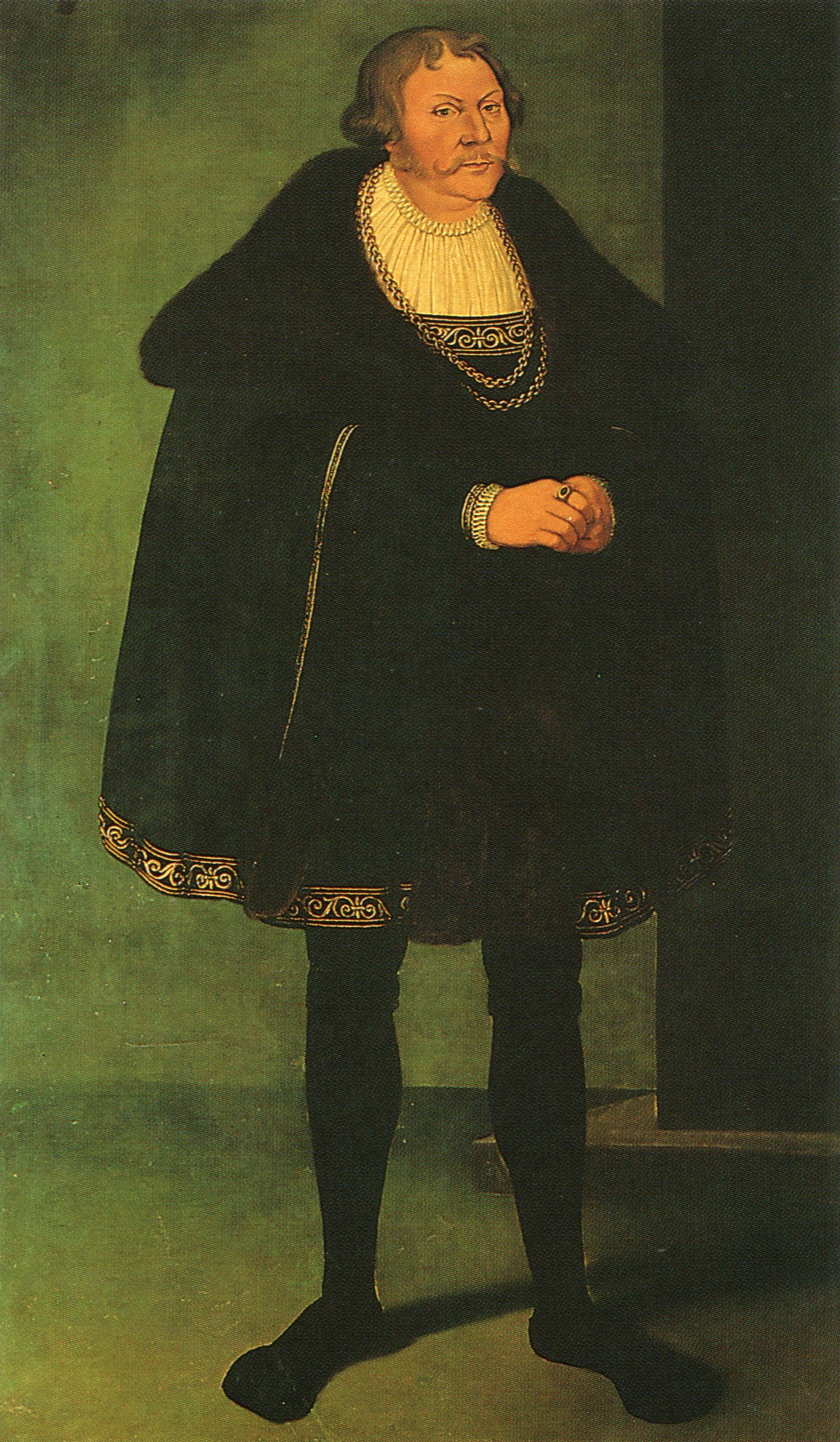
Henry V, Duke of Mecklenburg

Saint Francis Xavier

- January 3 – Henry of the Palatinate, bishop of Utrecht (b. 1487)
- January 10 – Johann Cochlaeus, German humanist and controversialist (b. 1479)
- January 22 – Edward Seymour, 1st Duke of Somerset, English politician (b. 1509)
- February 6 – Henry V, Duke of Mecklenburg (b. 1479)
- February 20 – Anne Parr, Countess of Pembroke, English countess (b. 1515)
- February 26 – Heinrich Faber, German composer (b. 1500)
- March 29 – Guru Angad, Indian religious leader (b. 1504)
- April 19 – Olaus Petri, Swedish clergyman (b. 1493)
- April 18 – John Leland, English historian (b. 1502)
- April 21 – Petrus Apianus, German astronomer (b. 1495)
- May 26 – Sebastian Münster, German cartographer and cosmographer (b. 1488)
- June 10 – Alexander Barclay, British poet (b. 1476)
- July 9 – György Szondy, Hungarian soldier
- August 15 – Hermann of Wied, German Catholic archbishop (b. 1477)
- September 23 – Barbara of Brandenburg-Ansbach-Kulmbach, Landgravine of Leuchtenberg (b. 1495)
- October 14 – Oswald Myconius, Swiss Protestant reformer (b. 1488)
- October 17 – Andreas Osiander, German Protestant theologian (b. 1498)
- November 10 – Günther XL, Count of Schwarzburg (b. 1499)
- December 3 – Francis Xavier, Spanish Jesuit missionary and saint (b. 1506)
- December 20 – Katharina von Bora, wife of Martin Luther (b. 1499)

1553

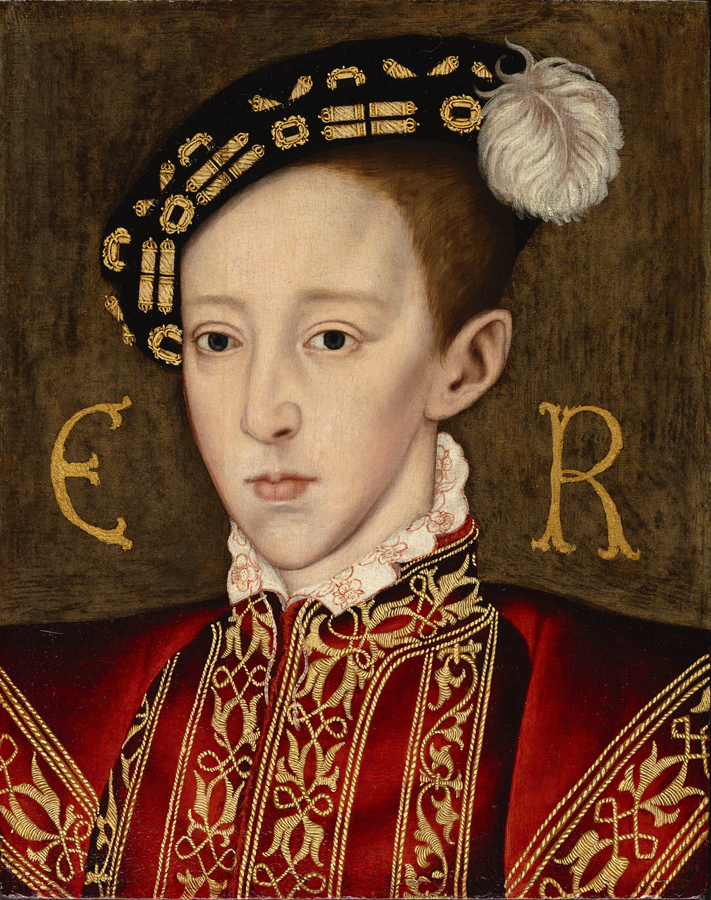
Edward VI of England

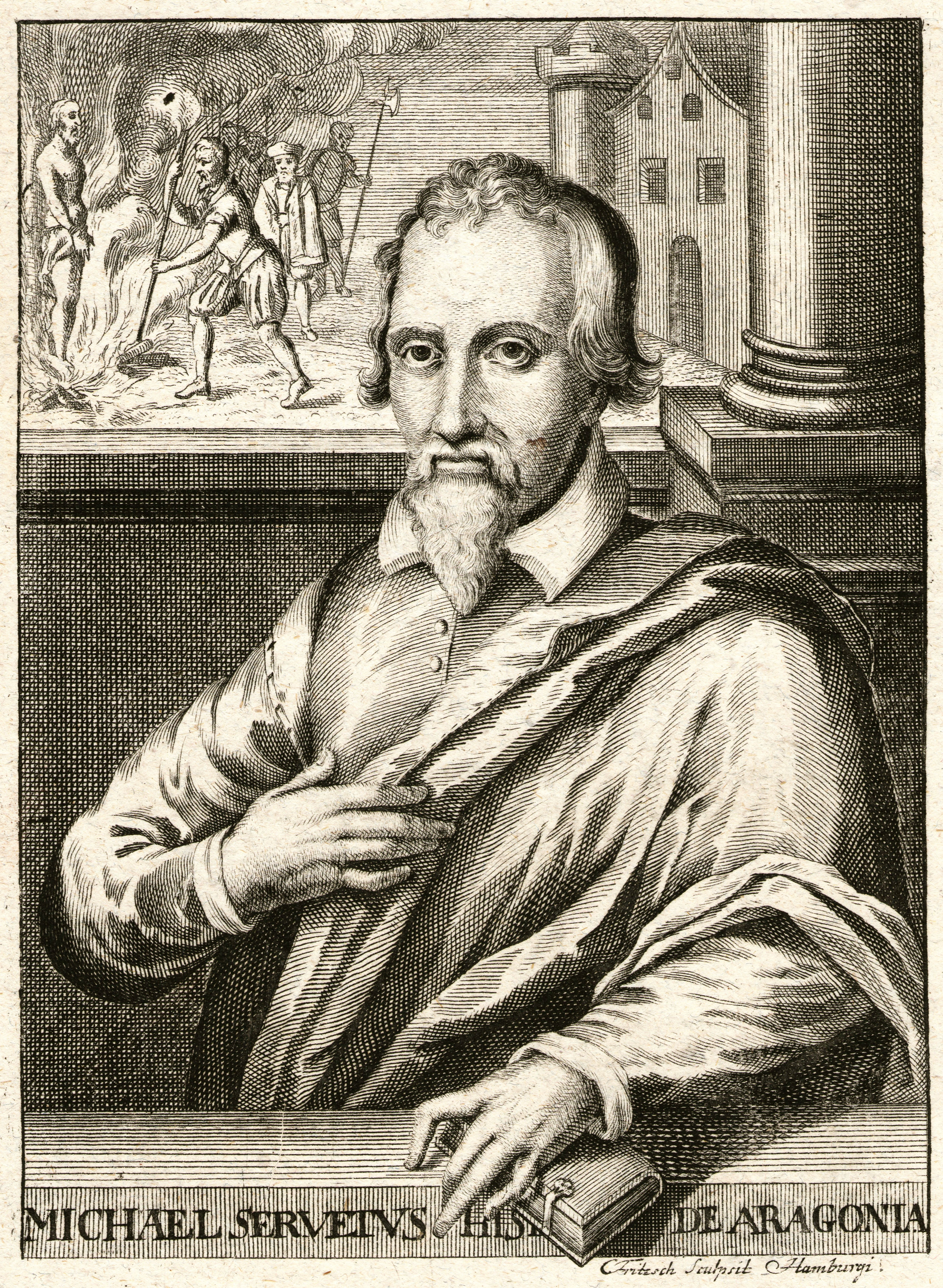
Michael Servetus

- January 13 – George II, Duke of Münsterberg-Oels, Count of Glatz (b. 1512)
- February 4 – Caspar Othmayr, German Protestant priest, theologian and composer (b. 1515)
- February 6 – Ernest, Margrave of Baden-Durlach (b. 1482)
- February 8 – John Ernest, Duke of Saxe-Coburg, (b. 1521)
- February 17 – Chamaraja Wodeyar III, King of Mysore (b. 1492)
- February 19 – Erasmus Reinhold, German astronomer and mathematician (b. 1511)
- February 25 – Hirate Masahide, Japanese diplomat and tutor of Oda Nobunaga (suicide) (b. 1492)
- April – Minkhaung of Prome, last king of Prome in Burma (Myanmar)
- April 9 – François Rabelais, French writer
- May 5 – Erasmus Alberus, German humanist (b. 1500)
- May 28 – Johannes Aal, Swiss theologian (b. 1500)
- June 26 – Tsarevich Dmitry Ivanovich of Russia, Grand Prince of Moscow (b. 1552)
- July 6 – King Edward VI of England (b. 1537)
- July 9 – Maurice, Elector of Saxony (b. 1521)
- July 16 – Bernardino Maffei, Catholic cardinal (b. 1514)
- August 6 – Girolamo Fracastoro, Italian physician (b. 1478)
- August 17 – Charles III, Duke of Savoy (b. 1486)
- August 22 – John Dudley, 1st Duke of Northumberland (b. 1502; executed)
- September 6 – Juan de Homedes y Coscon, 47th Grandmaster of the Knights Hospitaller (b. c. 1477)
- October 6 – Şehzade Mustafa, Suleiman the Magnificent's first-born son by Mahidevran Hatun (b. 1515)
- October 7 – Cristóbal de Morales, Spanish composer (b. 1500)
- October 16 – Lucas Cranach the Elder, German painter (b. 1472)
- October 17 – George III, Prince of Anhalt-Dessau, German prince (b. 1507)
- October 27 – Michael Servetus, Spanish Protestant theologian (burned at the stake) (b. 1511)
- October 28 – Giovanni Salviati, Italian Catholic cardinal (b. 1490)
- October 30 – Jacob Sturm von Sturmeck, German statesman and reformer (b. 1489)
- November 15 – Lucrezia de' Medici, Italian noblewoman (b. 1470)
- November 23 – Sebastiano Antonio Pighini, Italian cardinal (b. 1500)
- November 27 – Şehzade Cihangir, Ottoman prince (b. 1531)
- December 3 – Ludwig of Hanau-Lichtenberg, German nobleman (b. 1487)
- December 25 – Pedro de Valdivia, Spanish conquistador (b. 1497)
- date unknown
  - George Joye, English Protestant Bible translator (b. c. 1495)
  - Gunilla Bese, Finnish noble and fiefholder (b. 1475)

1554

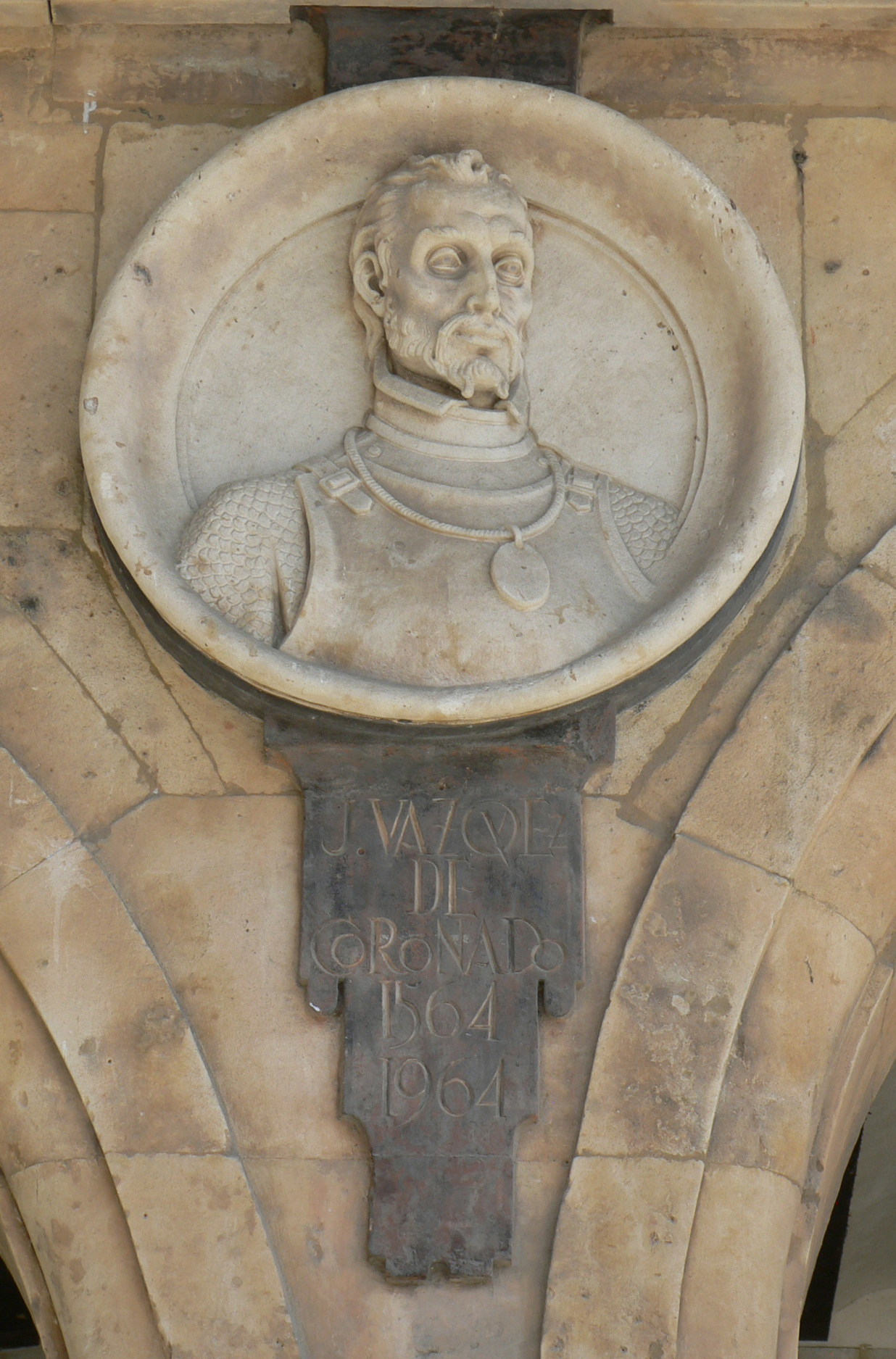
Francisco Vázquez de Coronado

- January 2 – João Manuel, Prince of Portugal, Portuguese prince (b. 1537)
- January 11 – Min Bin, king of Arakan (b. 1493)
- January 16
  - Christiern Pedersen, Danish humanist (b. c. 1480)
  - Ambrosius Moibanus, German theologian (b. 1494)
- February 12
  - Lord Guildford Dudley, consort of Lady Jane Grey (executed) (b. 1536)
  - Lady Jane Grey, claimant to the throne of England (executed) (b. 1537)
- February 21
  - Hieronymus Bock, German botanist (b. 1498)
  - Sibylle of Cleves, Electress consort of Saxony (b. 1512)
- February 23 – Henry Grey, 1st Duke of Suffolk, English politician (executed) (b. c.1515)
- March 3 – John Frederick I, Elector of Saxony (b. 1503)
- April 11 – Thomas Wyatt the Younger, English rebel (executed) (b. 1521)
- April 23 – Gaspara Stampa, Italian poet (b. 1523)
- May 2 – William Waldegrave, English Member of Parliament (b. 1507)
- June 19
  - Sixt Birck, German humanist (b. 1501)
  - Philip II, Count of Nassau-Saarbrücken, German noble (b. 1509)
- June 28 – Leone Strozzi, French Navy admiral (b. 1515)
- August 25 – Thomas Howard, 3rd Duke of Norfolk, English politician (b. 1473)
- September 22 – Francisco Vázquez de Coronado, Spanish conquistador (b. c. 1510)
- December 22 – Alessandro Bonvicino, Italian painter (b. 1498)
- December – John Taylor, Bishop of Lincoln (b. 1503)
- approx. date – Susannah Hornebolt, English artist (b. 1503)
- date unknown
  - Argula von Grumbach, German Protestant reformer (b. 1492)
  - Leo Africanus, Andalusian Berber writer (b. 1485)
  - Sebastiano Serlio, Italian architect (b. 1475)
  - Sir Hugh Willoughby, English Arctic explorer

1555

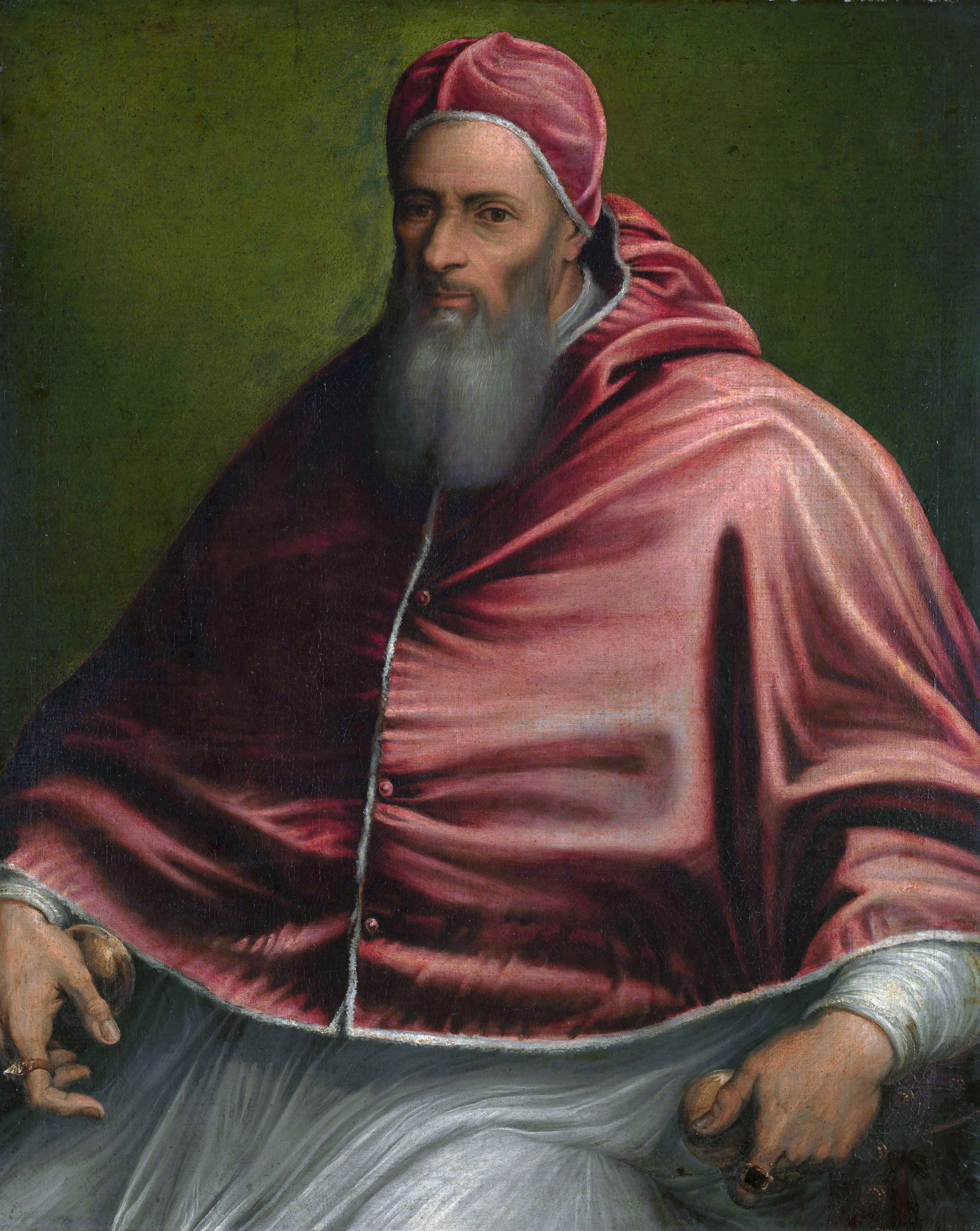
Pope Julius III

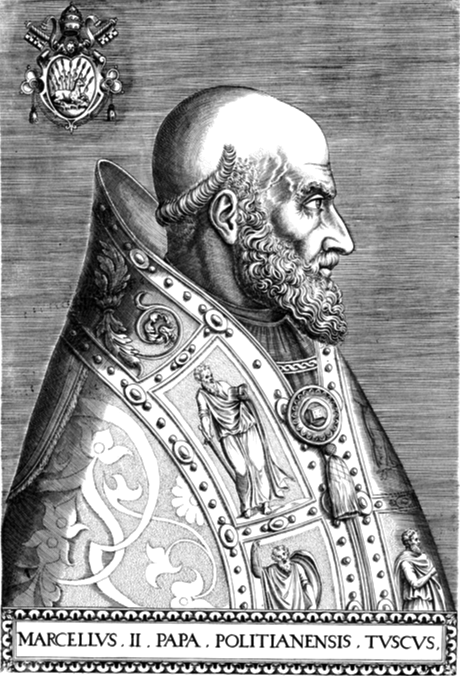
Pope Marcellus II

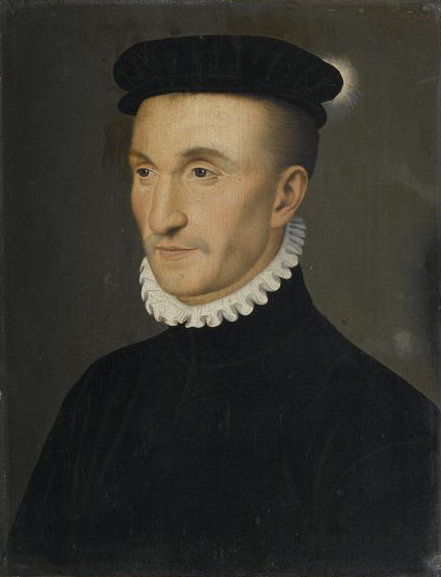
King Henry II of Navarre

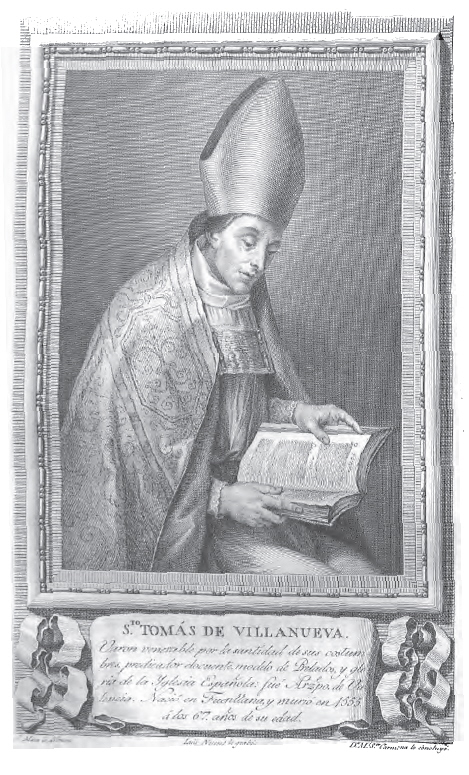
Saint Thomas of Villanova

- January 14 – Jacques Dubois, French anatomist (b. 1478)
- February 4 – John Rogers, English clergyman (burned at the stake) (b. c. 1505)
- February 8 – Laurence Saunders, English clergyman (burned at the stake) (b. 1519)
- February 9
  - Christian Egenolff, German printer (b. 1502)
  - John Hooper, English churchman (burned at the stake) (b. c. 1497)
  - Rowland Taylor, English Protestant martyr (burned at the stake) (b. 1510)
- February 17 – Giuliano Bugiardini, Italian painter (b. 1475)
- March 14 – John Russell, 1st Earl of Bedford (b. 1485)
- March 23 – Pope Julius III (b. 1487)
- March 27 – Al-Mutawakkil Yahya Sharaf ad-Din, Imam of the Zaidi state in Yemen (b. 1473)
- April 12 – Queen Joanna of Castile, long under confinement (b. 1479)
- April 18 – Polydore Vergil, English historian (b. 1470)
- May 1 – Pope Marcellus II (b. 1501)
- May 21 – George III, Landgrave of Leuchtenberg (b. 1502)
- May 25
  - Gemma Frisius, Dutch mathematician and cartographer (b. 1508)
  - Henry II of Navarre (b. 1503)
- June 10 – Elizabeth of Denmark, Electress of Brandenburg (1502–1535) (b. 1485)
- September 8 – Thomas of Villanova, Spanish Roman Catholic bishop and saint (b. 1488)
- October 5 – Edward Wotton, English zoologist (b. 1492)
- October 9 – Justus Jonas, German Protestant reformer (b. 1493)
- October 16
  - Hugh Latimer, English clergyman (burned at the stake) (b. c. 1487)
  - Nicholas Ridley, English clergyman (burned at the stake)
  - Sue Harukata, Japanese retainer under the Ouchi clan (b. 1521)
- October 26 – Olympia Fulvia Morata, Italian classical scholar (b. 1526)
- November 4 – Agnes of Hesse, German nobleman, by marriage, Princess of Saxony (b. 1527)
- November 12
  - Stephen Gardiner, English bishop and Lord Chancellor (b. 1493)
  - Yang Jisheng, Ming Chinese statesman (beheaded) (b. 1516)
  - Zhang Jing, Ming Chinese general (beheaded)
- November 21 – Georgius Agricola, German scientist (b. 1490)
- December – Stanisław Kostka, Polish noble (b. 1487)
- December 9 – Elisabeth of Culemborg, German noble (b. 1475)

1556

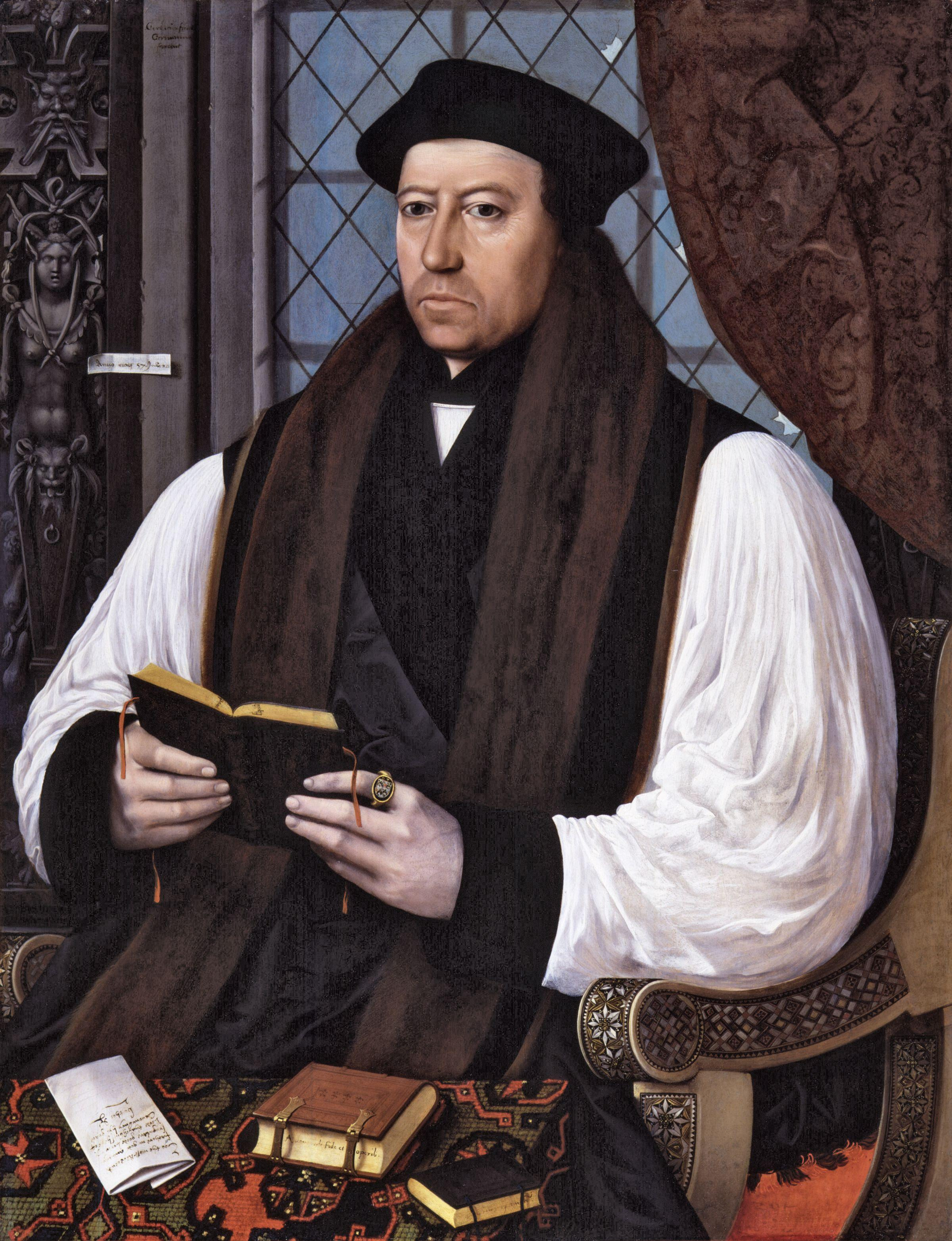
Thomas Cranmer

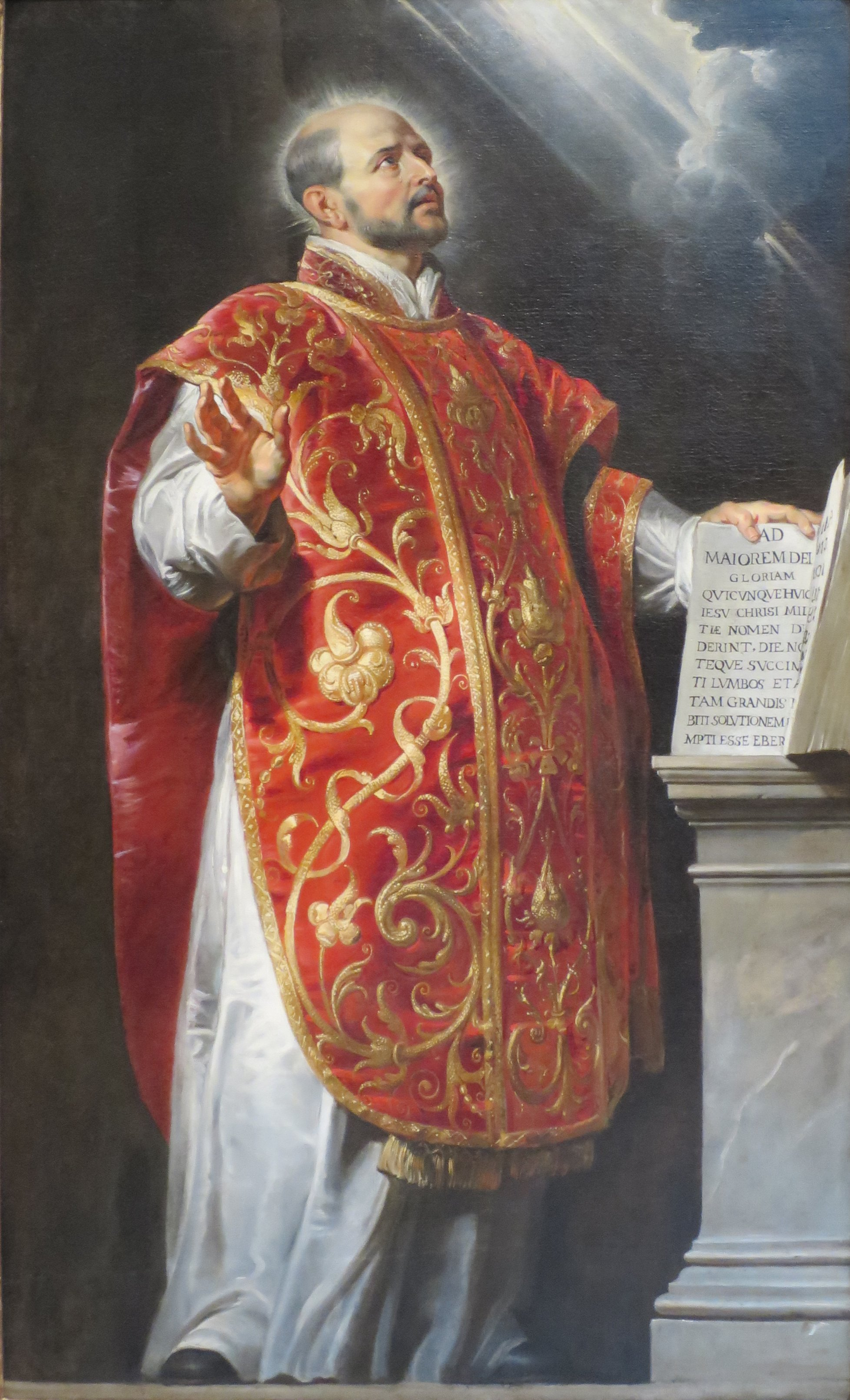
Saint Ignatius of Loyola

- January 8 – Anne Shelton, English courtier, elder sister of Thomas Boleyn (b. 1475)
- January 27 – Humayun, 2nd Mughal Emperor (b. 1508)
- February 12 – Giovanni Poggio, Italian cardinal and diplomat (b. 1493)
- February 26 – Frederick II, Elector Palatine (1544–1556) (b. 1482)
- March 21 – Thomas Cranmer, Archbishop of Canterbury (burned at the stake) (b. 1489)
- April 18
  - Luigi Alamanni, Italian poet and statesman (b. 1495)
  - John Gage, English courtier of the Tudor period (b. 1479)
- April 26 – Valentin Friedland, German scholar and educationist of the Reformation (b. 1490)
- May 4 – Luca Ghini, Italian physician and botanist (b. 1490)
- May 28 – Saitō Dōsan, Japanese warlord (b. 1494)
- June 10 – Martin Agricola, German composer (b. 1486)
- June 24 – Joan of Valois, French princess (b. 1556)
- July 31 – Ignatius of Loyola, Spanish founder of the Jesuit order and saint (b. 1491)
- August 1 – Girolamo da Carpi, Italian painter (b. 1501)
- August 11 – John Bell, Bishop of Worcester
- August 17 – Victoria of Valois, French princess (b. 1556)
- September – Patrick Hepburn, 3rd Earl of Bothwell, Scottish traitor (b. 1512)
- October 7 – Frederick of Denmark, Prince-bishop (b. 1532)
- October 21 – Pietro Aretino, Italian author (b. 1492)
- November 10 – Richard Chancellor, English Arctic explorer (drowned at sea) (b. c. 1521)
- November 14 – Giovanni della Casa, Italian poet (b. 1503)
- date unknown
  - Tullia d'Aragona, Italian poet, author and philosopher (b. 1510)
  - Fuzûlî, Turkish poet (b. 1494)
- probable
  - Brian mac Cathaoir O Conchobhair Failghe, last of the Kings of Ui Failghe
  - Jacob Clemens non Papa, Flemish composer (b. 1510)

1557

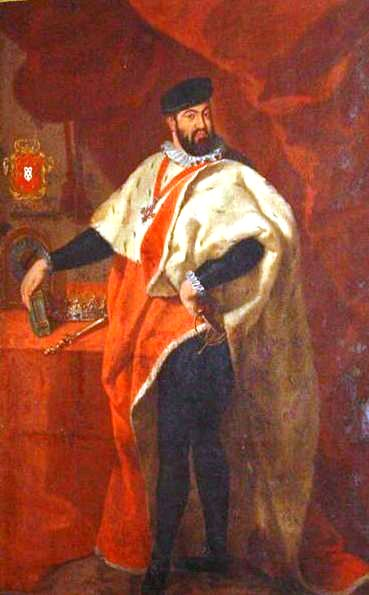
John III of Portugal

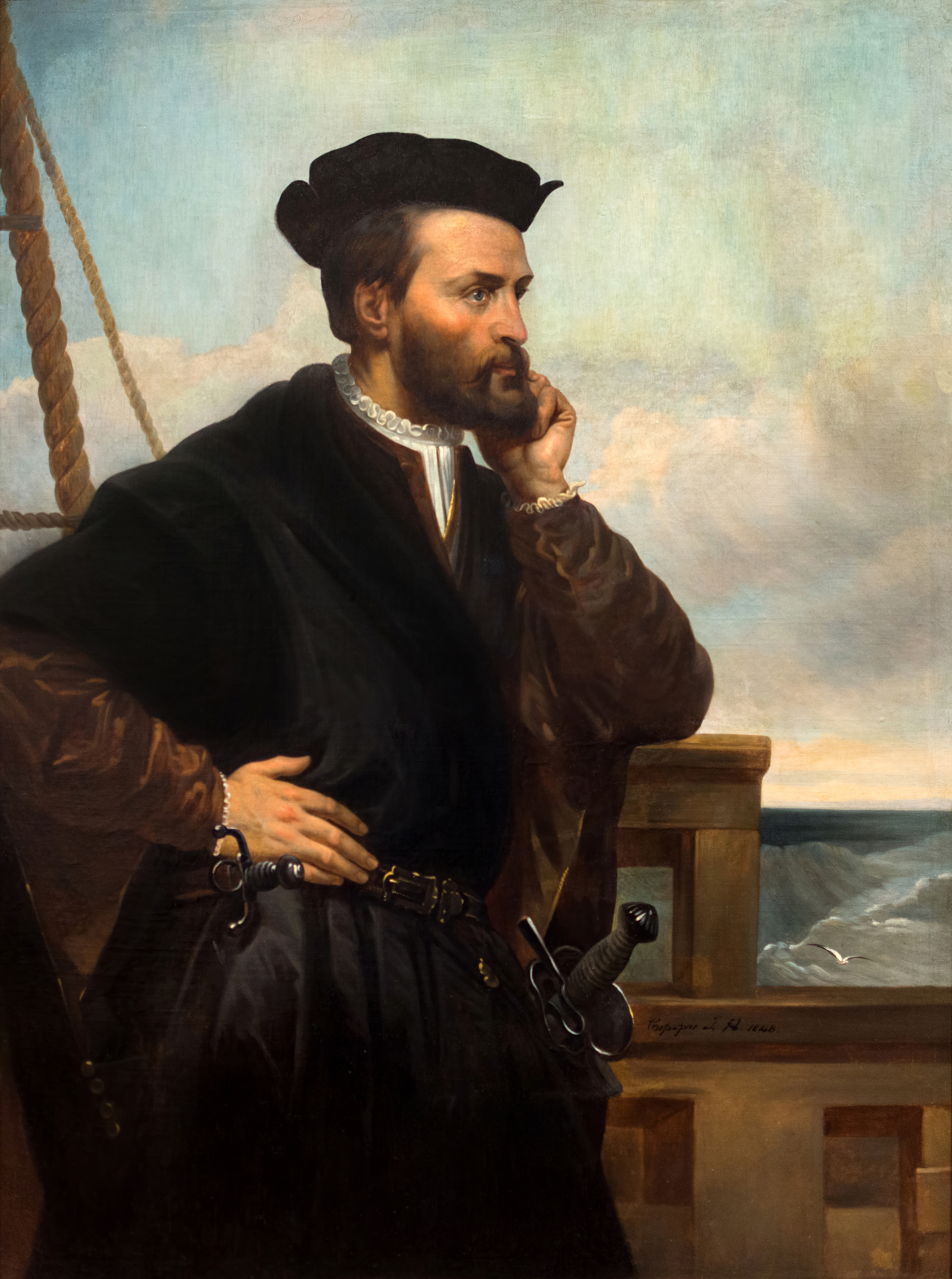
Jacques Cartier

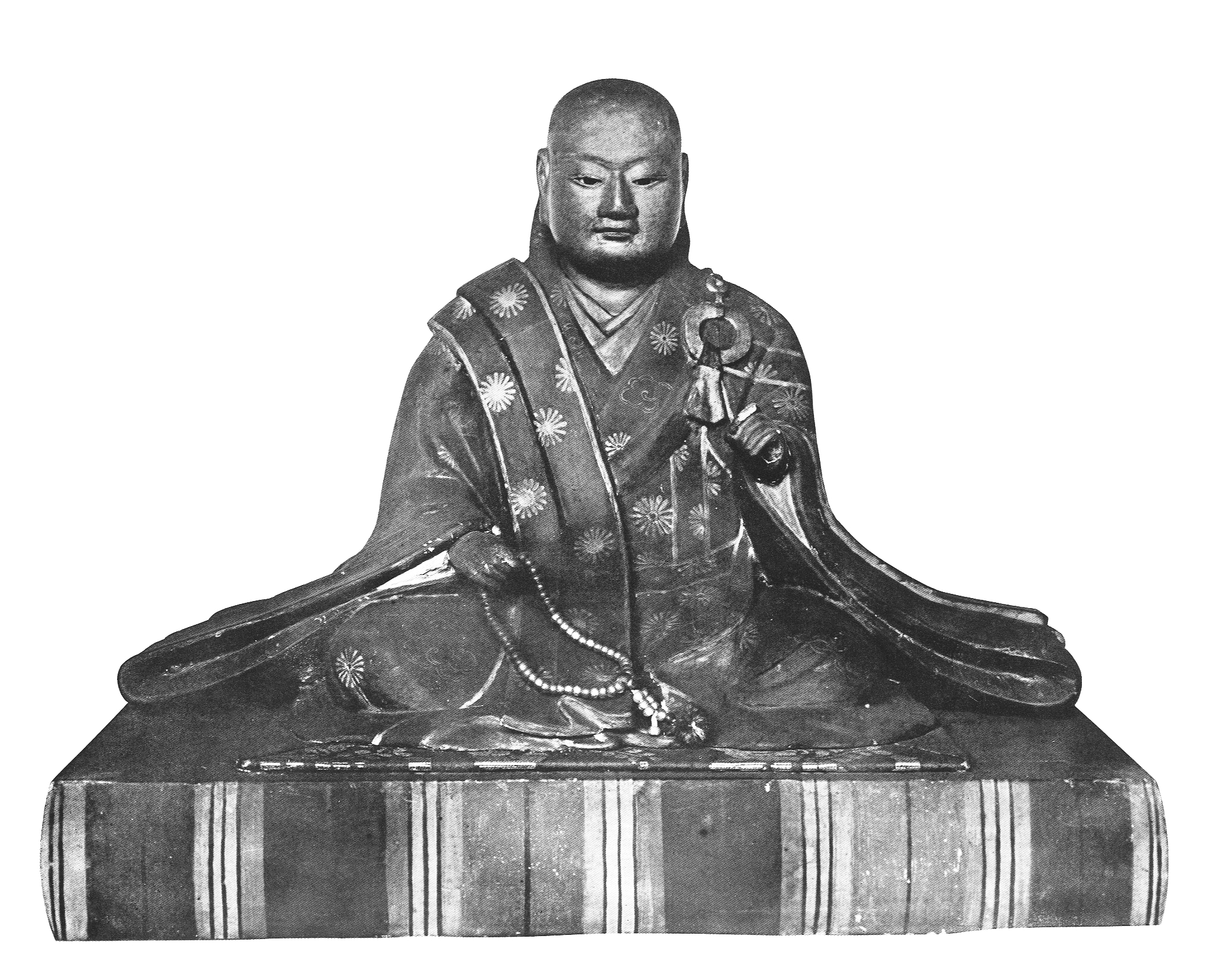
Emperor Go-Nara of Japan

- January 2 – Pontormo, Italian painter (b. 1494)
- January 4 – Philip, Duke of Mecklenburg, (b. 1514)
- January 8 – Albert Alcibiades, Margrave of Brandenburg-Kulmbach ("Albert the Warlike"), Prince of Bayreuth (b. 1522)
- March 13 – Louis de Bourbon de Vendôme, French cardinal (b. 1493)
- April 9 – Mikael Agricola, Finnish scholar (b. c. 1510)
- April 24 – Georg Rörer, German theologian (b. 1492)
- April 29 – Lautaro, Mapuche warrior (b. 1534)
- May 18 – John II, Count Palatine of Simmern, Count Palatine of Simmern (1509-1557) (b. 1492)
- June 10 – Leandro Bassano, Italian painter (d. 1622)
- June 11 – King John III of Portugal (b. 1502)
- July 10 – Giovanni Battista Ramusio, Italian geographer (b. 1485)
- July 16 – Anne of Cleves, fourth queen of Henry VIII of England (b. 1515)
- August 1 – Olaus Magnus, Swedish ecclesiastic and writer (b. 1490)
- August 18 – Claude de la Sengle, 48th Grandmaster of the Knights Hospitaller (b. 1494)
- September 1 – Jacques Cartier, French explorer (b. 1491)
- September 13 – John Cheke, English classical scholar and statesman (b. 1514)
- September 15 – Juan Álvarez de Toledo, Spanish Catholic cardinal (b. 1488)
- September 27 – Emperor Go-Nara of Japan (b. 1495)
- October 5 or October 6 – Kamran Mirza, Mughal prince (b. 1509)
- October 20 – Jean Salmon Macrin, French poet (b. 1490)
- October 25 – William Cavendish, English courtier (b. 1505)
- November 19
  - Bona Sforza, queen of Sigismund I of Poland (b. 1494)
  - Maria de' Medici, Italian noble (b. 1540)
- December 6 – Elisabeth of Hesse, Hereditary Princess of Saxony (b. 1502)
- December 13 – Niccolò Fontana Tartaglia, Italian mathematician (b. 1499)
- December 27 – Queen Dangyeong, Korean royal consort (b. 1487)
- date unknown
  - Gonzalo Fernández de Oviedo y Valdés, Spanish historian (b. 1478)
  - Charlotte Guillard, French printer
  - Nicolas de Herberay des Essarts, French translator
  - Geoffrey Glyn, English lawyer
- probable
  - Sebastian Cabot, Italian-born English explorer (b. 1476)
  - Thomas Crecquillon, Flemish composer (b. 1490)

1558

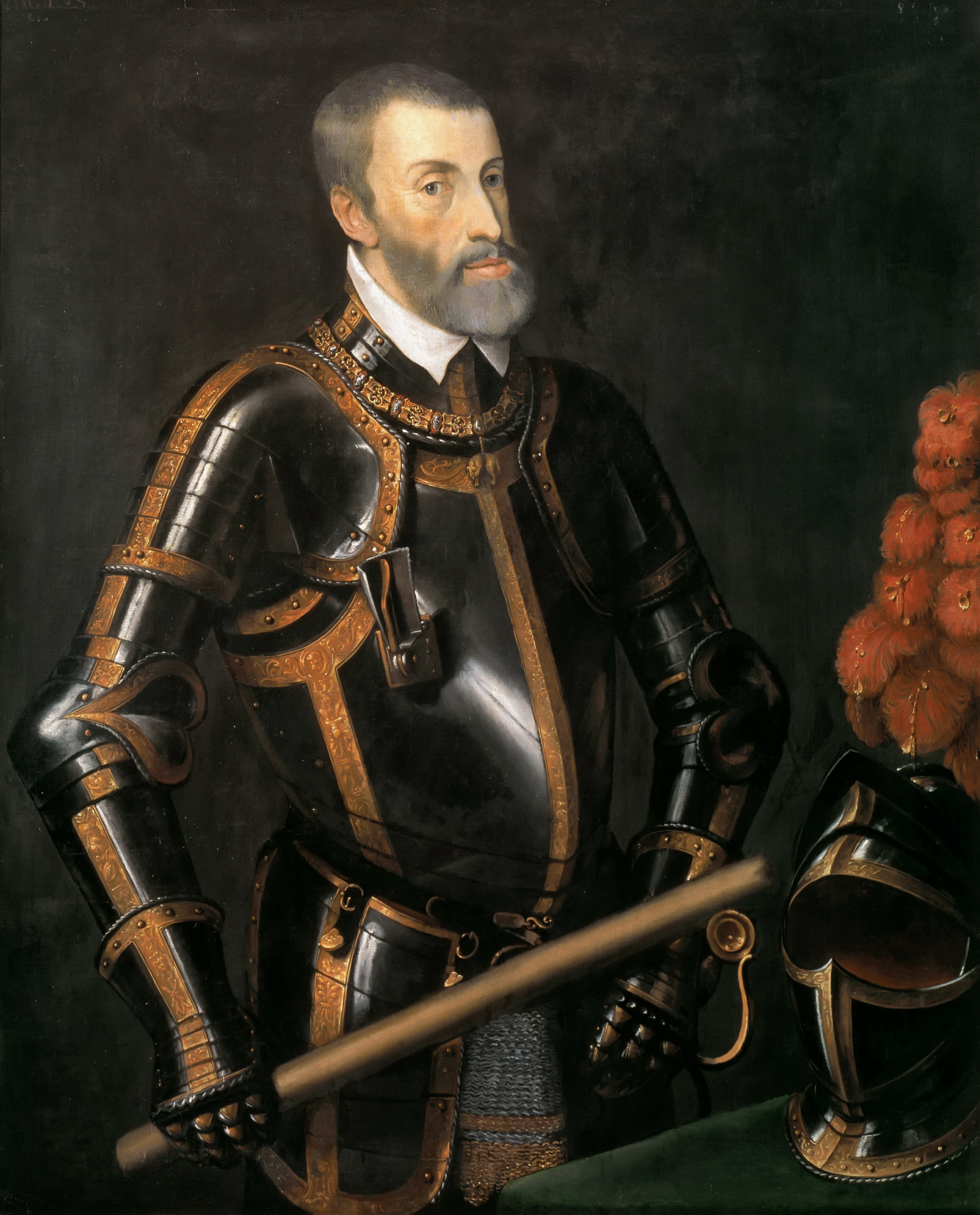
Emperor Charles V

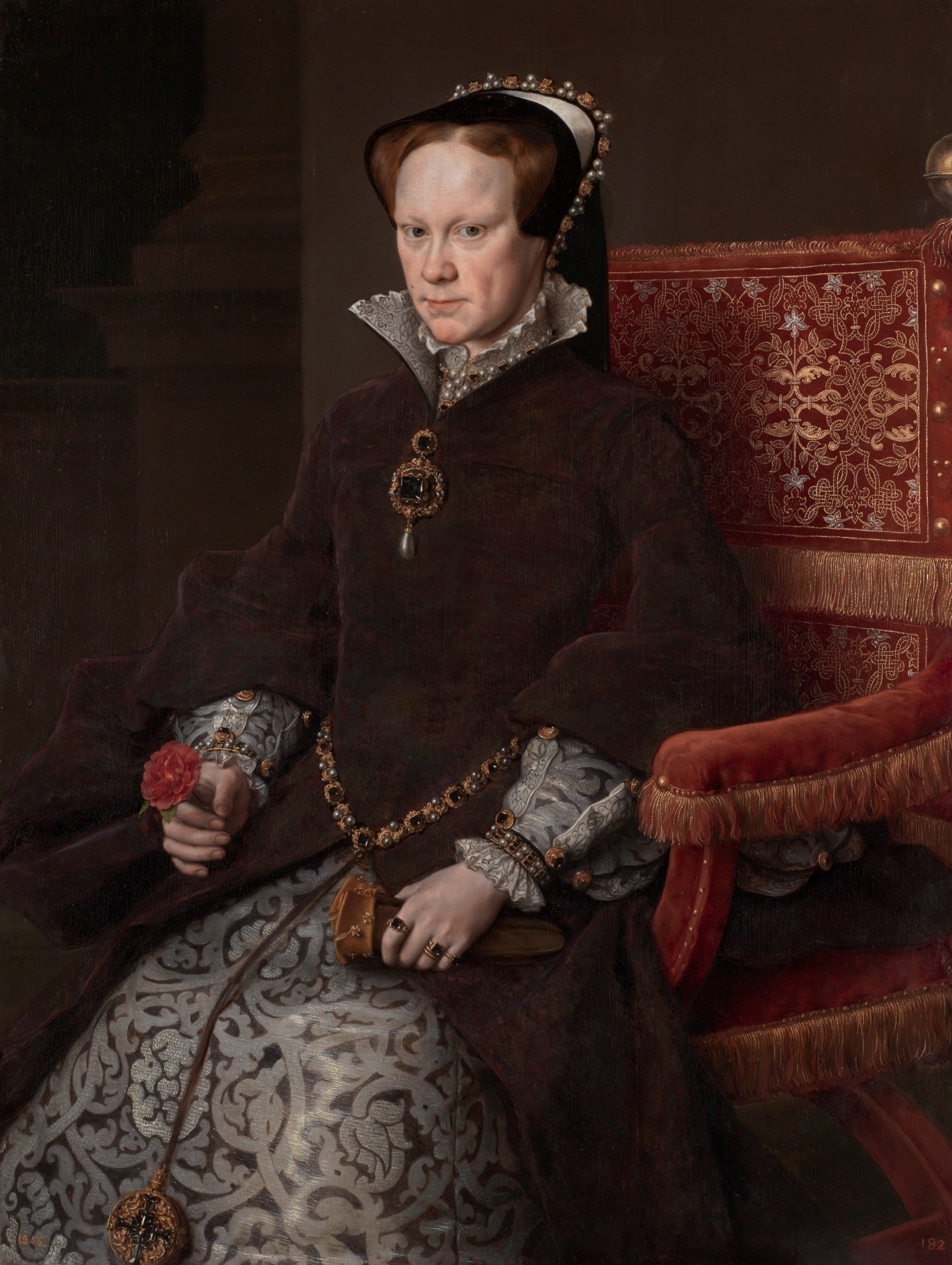
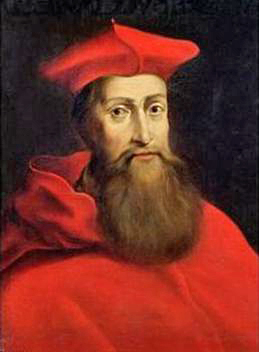
Queen Mary I of England and Cardinal Reginald Pole died on November 17, 1558
- January 28 – Jacob Micyllus, German humanist (b. 1503)
- February 25 – Eleanor of Austria, Queen of Portugal and France (b. 1498)
- February 27
  - Johann Faber of Heilbronn, controversial Catholic preacher (b. 1504)
  - Kunigunde of Brandenburg-Kulmbach, German noblewoman (b. 1524)
- March 6 – Luca Gaurico, Italian astrologer (b. 1475)
- March 24 – Anna van Egmont, Countess of Egmond and Buren (b. c. 1533)
- March 25 – Marcos de Niza, French Franciscan explorer (b. c. 1495)
- April 2 – Wolfgang of the Palatinate, Count Palatine of Neumarkt (b. 1494)
- April 15 – Hurrem Sultan, Ruthenian-born wife of Suleiman the Magnificent (b. c. 1500)
- April 20 – Johannes Bugenhagen, German reformer (b. 1485)
- April 26 – Jean Fernel, French physician (b. 1497)
- May 17 – Francisco de Sá de Miranda, Portuguese poet (b. 1485)
- May 19 – Juan Téllez-Girón, 4th Count of Ureña, Spanish count (b. 1494)
- May 25 – Elisabeth of Brandenburg, Duchess of Brunswick-Calenberg-Göttingen (1525–1540) (b. 1510)
- May 31 – Philip Hoby, English politician (b. 1505)
- June 28 – Thomas Darcy, 1st Baron Darcy of Chiche, English courtier (b. 1506)
- July 17 – George I of Württemberg-Mömpelgard (b. 1498)
- August 11 – Justus Menius, German Lutheran pastor (b. 1499)
- September 21 – Charles V, Holy Roman Emperor (b. 1500)
- October – Mellin de Saint-Gelais, French poet (b. c. 1491)
- October 18 – Maria of Austria, queen of Louis II of Hungary and Bohemia (b. 1505)
- October 21 – J. C. Scaliger, Italian scholar (b. 1484)
- November 1
  - Anne Brooke, Baroness Cobham, English noble (b. 1501)
  - Erhard Schnepf, German theologian (b. 1495)
- November 15 – Gilbert Kennedy, 3rd Earl of Cassilis, Scottish politician and judge (b. 1515)
- November 17
  - (bur.) Hugh Aston, English composer (b. 1485)
  - Queen Mary I of England (b. 1516)
  - Reginald Pole, Cardinal Archbishop of Canterbury (b. 1500)
- December 7 – Johann Forster, German theologian (b. 1496)
- December 16 – Thomas Cheney, Lord Warden of the Cinque Ports (b. c. 1485)
- December 19 – Cornelius Grapheus, Flemish writer (b. 1482)
- December 28 – Hermann Finck, German composer (b. 1527)
- date unknown
  - Archibald Campbell, 4th Earl of Argyll, Scottish nobleman and politician (b. 1507)
  - Robert Recorde, Welsh physician and mathematician (b. c. 1512)

1559

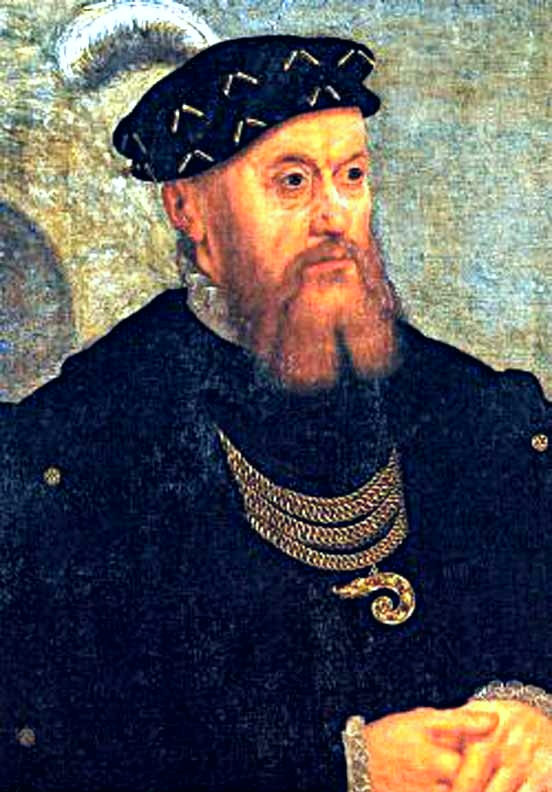
King Christian III of Denmark and Norway died on New Year's Day, January 1, 1559

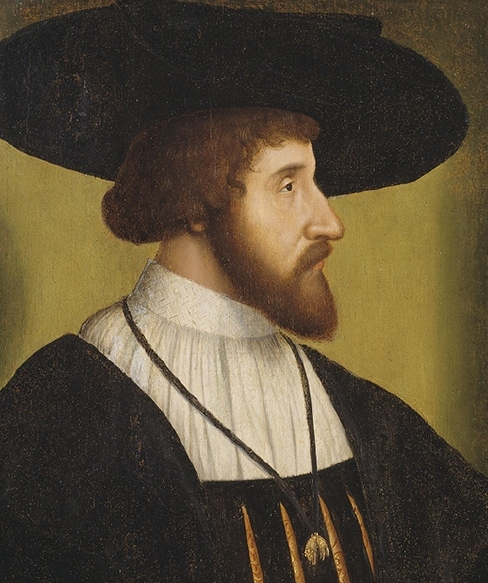
King Christian II of Denmark, Norway and Sweden died on January 25, 1559

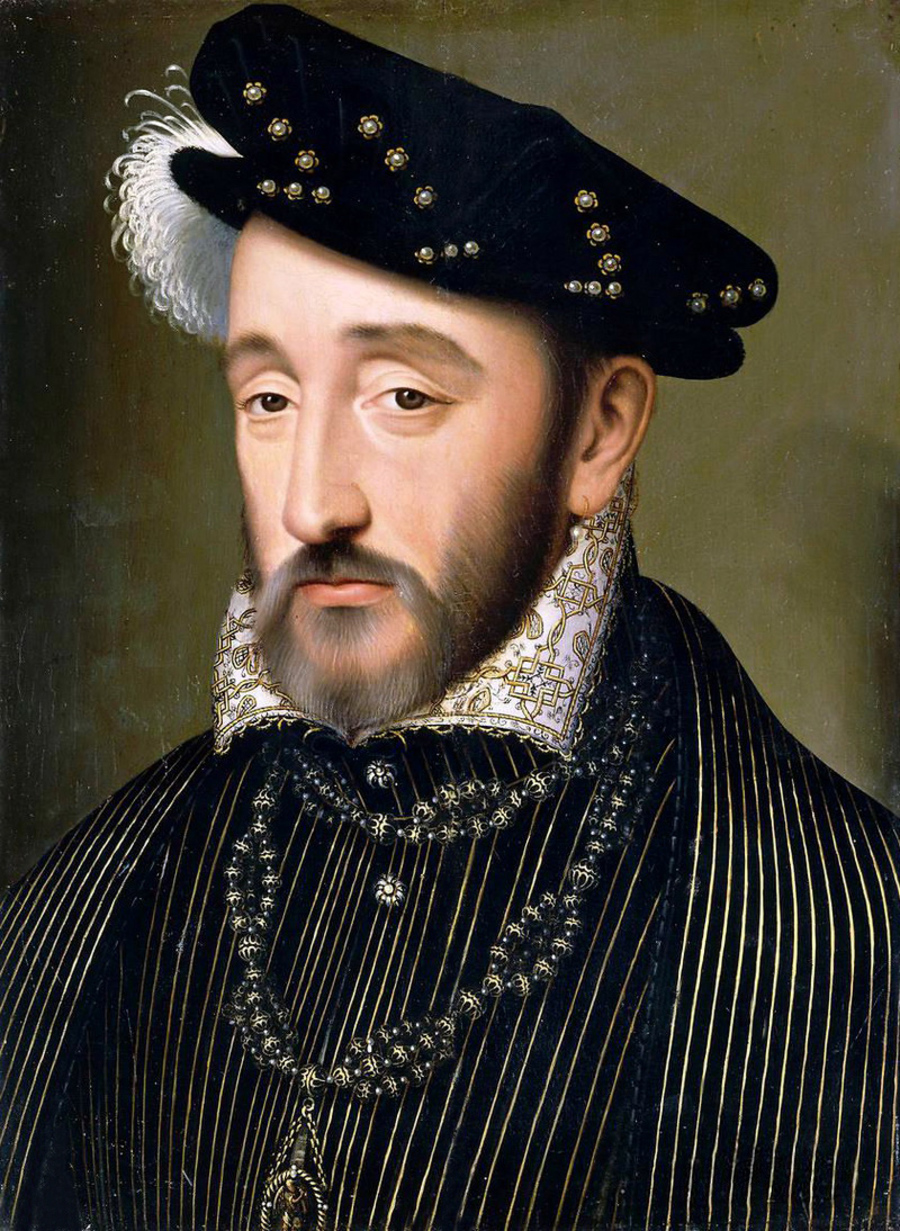
King Henry II of France died on July 10, 1559

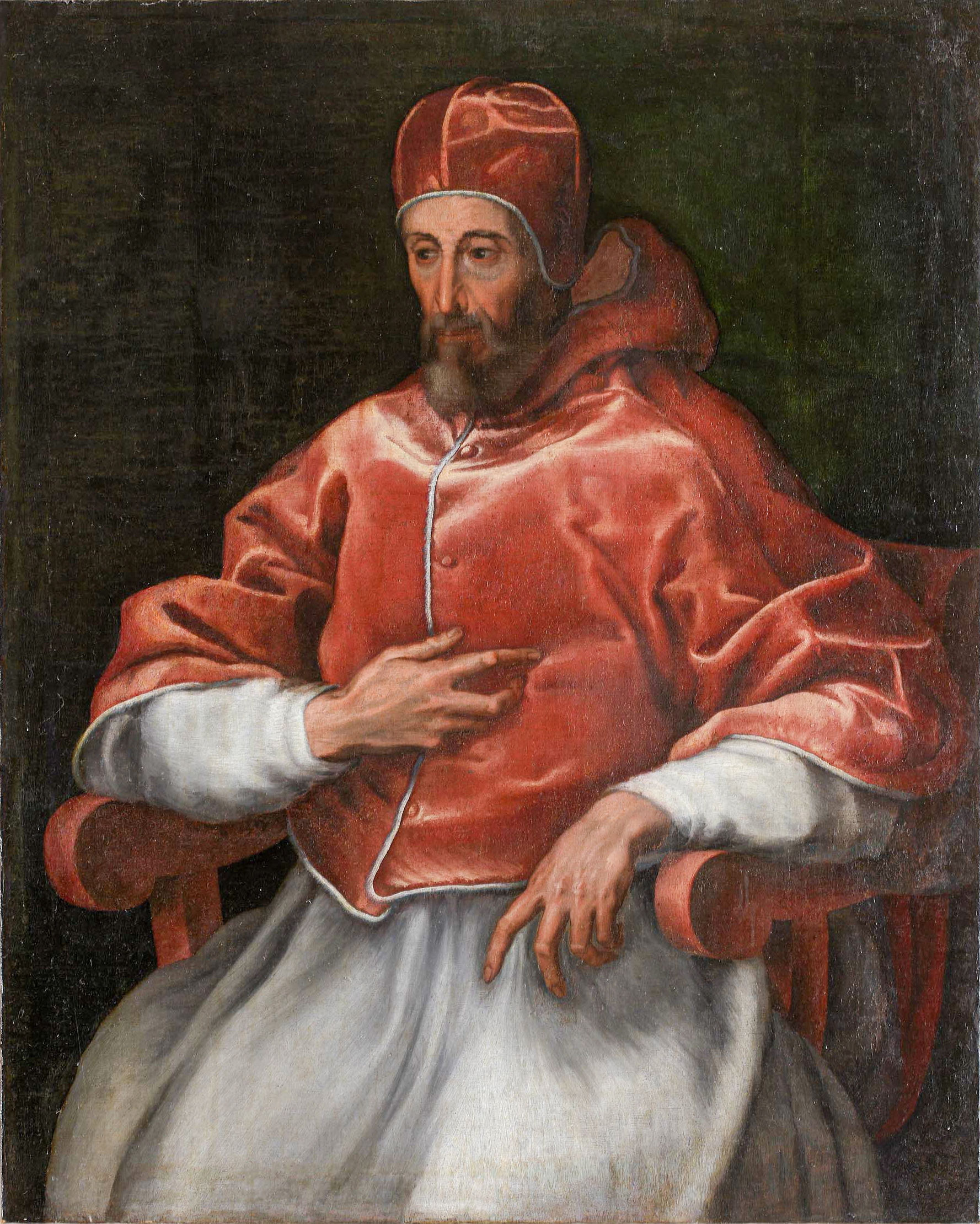
Pope Paul IV died on August 18, 1559

- January – Christina Gyllenstierna, leading opponent of King Christian II of Denmark and Norway (b. 1494)
- January 1 – King Christian III of Denmark and Norway (b. 1503)
- January 25 – King Christian II of Denmark, Norway and Sweden (b. 1481)
- February 12 – Prince-elector Otto Henry of the Palatinate (b. 1502)
- March 8 – Thomas Tresham, English Catholic politician
- March 13 – Johann Gropper, German Catholic cardinal (b. 1503)
- March 16 – Anthony St. Leger, Lord Deputy of Ireland (b. 1496)
- March 23 – Emperor Gelawdewos of Ethiopia (in battle) (b. 1522)
- March 30 – Adam Ries, German mathematician (b. 1492)
- June 3 – Elisabeth of Nassau-Siegen, German noblewoman (b. 1488)
- July 10 – King Henry II of France (jousting accident) (b. 1519)
- August 18 – Pope Paul IV (b. 1476)
- September 7 – Robert Estienne, French printer (b. 1503)
- September 15 – Isabella Jagiellon, queen consort of Hungary (d. 1519)
- October 2 – Jacquet of Mantua, French composer (b. 1483)
- October 3 – Ercole II d'Este, Duke of Ferrara, Italian noble (b. 1508)
- October 4 – Philip III, Count of Nassau-Weilburg (b. 1504)
- October 6 – William I, Count of Nassau-Siegen (b. 1487)
- November 5 – Kanō Motonobu, Japanese painter (b. 1476)
- November 10 – Jacob Milich, German astronomer and mathematician (b. 1501)
- November 18 – Cuthbert Tunstall, English church leader (b. 1474)
- November 20 – Frances Grey, Duchess of Suffolk, English noblewoman and claimant to the throne of England (b. 1517)
- November 26 – Adolph of Nassau-Saarbrücken, Count of Nassau (b. 1526)
- December 17 – Irene di Spilimbergo, Italian Renaissance poet and painter (b. 1538)
- December 31 – Owen Oglethorpe, deposed English bishop
- date unknown
  - Realdo Colombo, Italian surgeon and anatomist (b. 1516)
  - Elizabeth Wilford, English merchant and company founder
  - Father Francis of Aberdeen, Catholic Trinitarian friar
  - Leonard Digges, English mathematician and surveyor (b. c. 1515)
  - Conn O'Neill, 1st Earl of Tyrone, Irish rebel (b. 1480)
  - Wen Zhengming, Chinese painter (b. 1470)
