= Weimar edition of Martin Luther's works =

Collection of Martin Luther's works

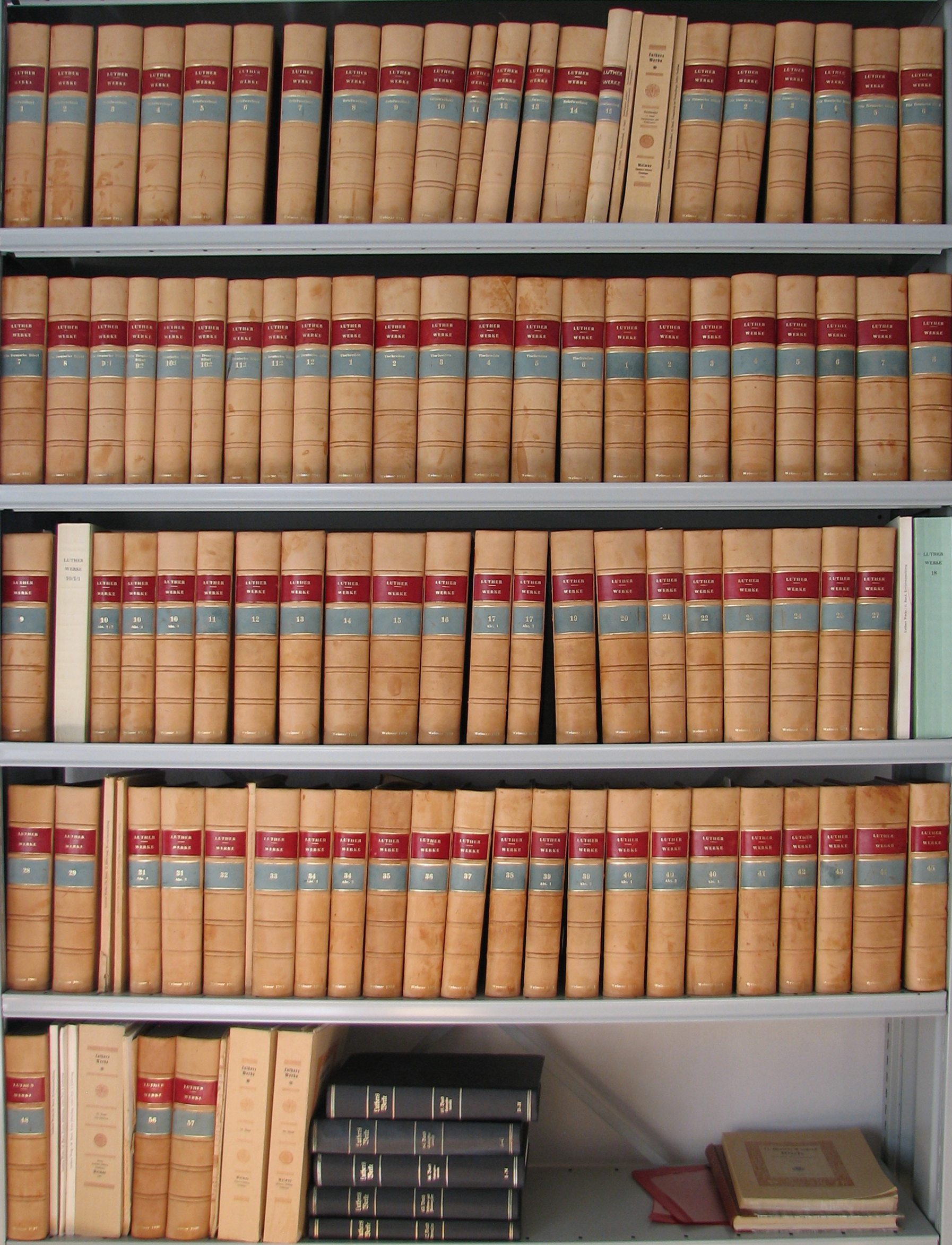
Various books of the Weimarer Ausgabe

The Weimar edition of Luther's works, also known as the Weimarer Ausgabe (WA), is a critical complete edition of all writings of Martin Luther and his verbal statements, in Latin and German. The official title of this edition is D. Martin Luthers Werke: kritische Gesamtausgabe. Also included are Luther's Table Talk (Tischreden), Letters (Briefe), and Bible Translation (Die deutsche Bibel). The three subseries (Tischreden, Die deutsche Bibel, and Briefwechsel) are numbered separately.

The publisher was Hermann Böhlau of Weimar, and Gothic rather than Roman type was used, even in the later volumes. The imprint varies; later volumes were published by Hermann Böhlaus Nachfolger. Over the 120 years many editors have collaborated to prepare the contents, which have not been published in exact chronological order. The title on the spine of the volumes is Luthers Werke.

== History ==
The editorial work on the WA began in 1883, on Luther's 400th birthday. The work was completed in 2009 in 127 volumes in quarto format with approximately 80,000 pages. It was undertaken under the direction of a commission appointed by the Prussian Ministry of Education: a supervisory role was continued by the Heidelberger Akademie der Wissenschaften after the demise of the government of Prussia.

The WA is divided into four series:

- Abt. 1 Schriften / Werke (writings / works), 72 volumes, including 8 in two parts (abbreviation: WA)
- Abt. 2 Tischreden (table talk), 6 volumes (abbreviation: WA TR)
- Abt. 3 Die deutsche Bibel (The German Bible), 15 volumes (abbreviation: WA DB)
- Abt. 4 Briefe/Briefwechsel (correspondence), 18 volumes (abbreviation: WA BR)

Subject indexes are provided for each of the series, and the WA is also available online. The WA is a comprehensive edition of all works by Martin Luther. It is the only existing edition with all the works of Martin Luther; all other editions are in some way incomplete. Editors of the edition have included Rudolf Hermann and Gerhard Ebeling.

== Writings or works ==
- WA 1. Schriften 1512/18 (einschließlich Predigten, Disputationen) (i.e. Writings, including Sermons and disputations)
- WA 2. Schriften 1518/19 (einschließlich Predigten, Disputationen)
- WA 3. Psalmenvorlesung 1513/15 (Ps. 1–84)
- WA 4. Psalmenvorlesung 1513/15 (Ps. 85–150); Randbemerkungen zu Faber Stapulensis; Richtervorlesung 1516/17; Sermone 1514/20 (i.e. Lecture on the Psalms; Marginal notes on Lefèvre d'Étaples; Lecture on Book of Judges; Sermon)
- WA 5. 2. Psalmenvorlesung 1519/21 (Ps. 1–22) (i.e. Lecture on the Psalms)
- WA 6. Schriften 1519/20 (einschließlich Predigten, Disputationen)
- WA 7. Schriften 1520/21 (einschließlich Predigten, Disputationen)
- WA 8. Schriften 1521/22 (einschließlich Predigten, Disputationen)
- WA 9. Schriften und Predigten 1509/21 (Nachträge und Ergänzungen zu Bd. 1–8) (i.e. Writings and sermons; Supplement and additions to vol. 1–8)
- WA 10. I. 1. Band, Weihnachtspostille 1522 (i.e. Christmas Postil)
- WA 10. I. 2. Band, Adventspostille 1522; Stephan Roths Sommerpostille 1526 (i.e. Advent postils; summer postils)
- WA 10. II. Band, Schriften 1522
- WA 10. III. Band, Predigten 1522
- WA 11. Predigten und Schriften 1523
- WA 12. Reihenpredigt über 1. Petrus 1522; Predigten 1522/23; Schriften 1523 (i.e. Sermon on 1 Peter; sermons; Formula missae; writings)
- WA 13. Vorlesungen über die Kleinen Propheten 1524/26 (i.e. Lectures on the Minor Prophets)
- WA 14. Reihenpredigten über 2. Petrus, Judas und 1. Mose 1523/24; Vorlesung über 5. Mose 1523/24 (i.e. Sermons on 2 Peter, Jude, and Genesis; Lecture on Deuteronomy)
- WA 15. Predigten und Schriften 1524
- WA 16. Reihenpredigten über 2. Mose 1524/27 (i.e. Sermons on Exodus)
- WA 17. I. Band, Predigten 1525
- WA 17. II. Band, Fastenpostille 1525; Stephan Roths Festpostille 1527 (i.e. Postils for fasts; postils for feasts)
- WA 18. Schriften 1525
- WA 19. Schriften 1526
- WA 20. Vorlesungen über Prediger Salomonis und 1. Johannesbrief 1526/27; Predigten 1526 (i.e. Lectures on Ecclesiastes and 1st Epistle of John; sermons)
- WA 21. Stephan Roths Winterpostille 1528; Crucigers Sommerpostille 1544 (i.e. Postils for winter; postils for summer)
- WA 22. Crucigers Sommerpostille (Fortsetzung) 1544
- WA 23. Predigten und Schriften 1527
- WA 24. Reihenpredigten über 1. Mose (1523/24), Druckfassung 1527 (i.e. Sermons on Genesis, according to the edition of 1527)
- WA 25. Vorlesungen über Titus und Philemon 1527; Vorlesung über Jesaja (1528/30), Druckfassung 1532/34; Reihenpredigten über 3. und 4. Mose 1527/28 (i.e. Lectures on Titus and Philemon; lecture on Isaiah, according to the edition of 1532–34)
- WA 26. Vorlesung über 1. Timotheus 1528; Schriften 1528 (i.e. Lecture on 1 Timothy; writings)
- WA 27. Predigten 1528
- WA 28. Reihenpredigten über Matthäus 11–15, Johannes 16–20 und 5. Mose 1528/29 (i.e. Sermons on Matthew, XI–XV; John, XVI–XX; and Deuteronomy)
- WA 29. Predigten 1529
- WA 30. I. Band, Katechismuspredigten 1528; Großer und Kleiner Katechismus 1529 (i.e. Sermons on the Catechism; Large Catechism and Small Catechism)
- WA 30. II. Band, Schriften 1529/30 (Revisionsnachtrag von 1967) (i.e. Supplement: revisions of 1967)
- WA 30. II. Band, Revisionsnachtrag (i.e. Supplement: revisions)
- WA 30. III. Band, Schriften 1529/32 (Revisionsnachtrag von 1970)
- WA 30. III. Band, Revisionsnachtrag
- WA 31. I. Band, Psalmenauslegungen 1529/32 (i.e. Expositions of the Psalms)
- WA 31. II. Band, Vorlesungen über Jesaja und Hoheslied 1528/31 (i.e. Lectures on Isaiah and the Song of Solomon)
- WA 32. Predigten 1530; Reihenpredigten über Matthäus 5–7 1530/32 (i.e. Sermons; sermons on Matthew V–VII)
- WA 33. Reihenpredigten über Johannes 6–8 1530/32 (Revisionsnachtrag von 1963) (i.e. Sermons on John VI–VIII)
- WA 34. I. Band, Predigten 1531
- WA 34. II. Band, Predigten 1531
- WA 35. Lieder (i.e. Songs)
- WA 35. Wort- und Sachregister (i.e. Index of words and subjects)
- WA 36. Predigten 1532
- WA 37. Predigten 1533/34
- WA 38. Schriften 1533/36
- WA 39. I. Band, Disputationen 1535/38 (i.e. Disputations)
- WA 39. II. Band, Disputationen 1539/45
- WA 40. I. Band, 2. Galatervorlesung (cap. 1–4) 1531 (i.e. Lecture on Galatians)
- WA 40. II. Band, 2. Galatervorlesung (cap. 5–6) 1531; Vorlesungen über Psalm 2, 45 und 51 1532 (i.e. Lecture on Galatians, contd; lectures on Psalms 2, 45 & 51)
- WA 40. III. Band, Vorlesungen über die Stufenpsalmen und Ps. 90 1532/35; Vorlesungen über Jesaja 9 und 53 1543/44; Auslegung von Hosea 13 1545 (i.e. Lectures on the Psalms of ascent & psalm 90; lectures on Isaiah IX & LIII; exposition of Hosea XIII)
- WA 41. Predigten 1535/36 (Revisionsnachtrag von 1974) (i.e. Supplement: revisions of 1974)
- WA 42. Genesisvorlesung (cap. 1–17) 1535/38 (i.e. Lecture on Genesis)
- WA 43. Genesisvorlesung (cap. 8–30) 1538/42
- WA 44. Genesisvorlesung (cap. 31–50) 1543/45
- WA 45. Predigten 1537 und Predigtkompilationen (30er Jahre); Reihenpredigten über Johannes 14–15 (1533), Druckfassung 1538 (i.e. Sermons; compilations of sermons, 1530s; sermons on John XIV–XV, according to the edition of 1538)
- WA 46. Reihenpredigten über Johannes 16 (1533/34), Druckfassung 1538; Predigten 1538; Reihenpredigten über Johannes 1–2 1537/38
- WA 47. Reihenpredigten über Johannes 3–4 und Matthäus 18–24 1537/40; Predigten 1539 (i.e. Sermons on John III–IV and Matthew XVIII–XXIV; sermons)
- WA 48. Bibel- und Bucheinzeichnungen (Revisionsnachtrag von 1972); Nachträge zu Schriften, Predigten und Tischreden (i.e. Annotations to the Bible (supplement: revisions of 1972) and other books; supplement to writings, sermons and table talk)
- WA 49. Predigten 1540/45
- WA 50. Schriften 1536/39
- WA 51. Predigten 1545/46; Auslegung des 23. und 101. Psalms 1534/36; Schriften 1540/41; Sprichwörter-Sammlung (o. D.) (i.e. Sermons; exposition of psalms 23 & 101; writings; collection of proverbs)
- WA 52. Hauspostille 1544 (Veit Dietrich) (i.e. Postil for the house)
- WA 53. Schriften 1542/43
- WA 54. Schriften 1543/46
- WA 55. I. Band, 1. Psalmenvorlesung 1513/15, Glossen (i.e. First lecture on the Psalms: glosses)
- WA 55. II. Band, 1. Psalmenvorlesung 1513/15, Scholien (i.e. First lecture on the Psalms: scholia)
- WA 56. Römervorlesung (Hs.) 1515/16 (i.e. Lecture on Romans, MS.)
- WA 57. Römervorlesung (Nss.) 1515/16; 1. Galatervorlesung 1516; Hebräervorlesung 1517/18 (i.e. Lecture on Romans; first lecture on Galatians; lecture on Hebrews)
- WA 58. I. Band, Register I–III (Persönliches, Personen, Orte) zu Bd. 1–54 (i.e. Indexes: personal, persons, places, to vol. 1–54)
- WA 59. Nachträge zu Bd. 1–57 und zu den Abteilungen ‘Deutsche Bibel’ und ‘Tischreden’ (i.e. Supplement to vol. 1–57 and to the sections German Bible and Table talk)
- WA 60. Nachträge zu Bd. 1–57; Geschichte und Bibliographie der Luther-Ausgaben vom 16.–19. Jahrhundert (i.e. Supplements to vol. 1–57: history and bibliography of the editions of Luther of the 16th to 19th centuries)
- WA 61. Inhaltsverzeichnis zur Abteilung ‘Schriften’ Bd. 1–60 nebst Verweisen auf die Abteilungen ‘Deutsche Bibel’, ‘Briefwechsel’, ‘Tischreden’ (i.e. List of contents for the section Writings, vol. 1–60, with amendments to the sections German Bible, Correspondence & Table talk)
- WA 62. Ortsregister zur Abteilung Schriften Bd. 1–60 einschließlich geographischer und ethnographischer Bezeichnungen (i.e. Index of words for the section Writings vol. 1–60, including geographical and ethnographical terms)
- WA 63. Personen- und Zitatenregister zur Abteilung Schriften Bd. 1–60 (i.e. Index of persons and citations, etc.)
- WA 64. Lateinisches Sachregister zur Abteilung Schriften Bd. 1–60, a–cyriologia (i.e. Latin subject index, A–C)
- WA 65. Lateinisches Sachregister zur Abteilung Schriften Bd. 1–60, daemon–hysteron proteron (i.e. Latin subject index, D–H)
- WA 66. Lateinisches Sachregister zur Abteilung Schriften Bd. 1–60, iaceo–nycticorax (i.e. Latin subject index, I–N)
- WA 67. Lateinisches Sachregister zur Abteilung Schriften Bd. 1–60, o–rutilus (i.e. Latin subject index, O–R)
- WA 68. Lateinisches Sachregister zur Abteilung Schriften Bd. 1–60, s–zythum (i.e. Latin subject index, S–Z)
- WA 69. Deutsches Sachregister zur Abteilung Schriften Bd. 1–60, A – exzitieren (i.e. German subject index, A–E)
- WA 70. Deutsches Sachregister zur Abteilung Schriften Bd. 1–60: F – Häutlein (i.e. German subject index, F–Ha)
- WA 71. Deutsches Sachregister zur Abteilung Schriften Bd. 1–60. He – Nutzung (i.e. German subject index, He–N)
- WA 72. Deutsches Sachregister zur Abteilung Schriften Bd. 1–60. O – Titel (i.e. German subject index, O–Titel)
- WA 73. Deutsches Sachregister zur Abteilung Schriften Bd. 1–60. Toben – Z (i.e. German subject index, Toben – Z)

== Table talk ==
- WA TR 1. Tischreden aus der ersten Hälfte der dreißiger Jahre (i.e. from the first half of the 1530s)

Nr. 1–656: Veit Dietrichs Nachschriften
Nr. 657–684: Nachschriften Nikolaus Medlers
Nr. 685–1231: Veit Dietrichs und Nikolaus Meddlers Sammlung

- WA TR 2. Tischreden aus den dreißiger Jahren (i.e. from the 1530s, continued)

Nr. 1232–1889: Johannes Schlaginhaufens Nachschriften
Nr. 1890–1949: Ludwig Rabes Sammlung
Nr. 1950–2802b: Die Sammlung von Konrad Cordatus (Erste Hälfte)

- WA TR 3. Tischreden aus den dreißiger Jahren (i.e. from the 1530s, continued)

Nr. 2803a–3416: Die Sammlung von Konrad Cordatus (Schluß)
Nr. 3417–3462: Tischreden aus der Handschrift "Cord. B."
Nr. 3463a–3463h: Tischreden aus der Handschrift Zwick.
Nr. 3464a–3464p: Tischreden aus der Handschrift "Wolf. 3231."
Nr. 3465–3659: Anton Lauterbachs und Hieronymus Wellers Nachschriften aus den Jahren 1536 und 1537
Nr. 3660–3682: Tischreden aus dem 1. Abschnitt der Handschrift "Math. L."
Nr. 3683–4201: Anton Lauterbachs Tagebuch auf Jahr 1538

- WA TR 4. Tischreden aus den Jahren 1538–1540

Nr. 4202–4318: Tischreden, die in der Sammlung B. und in der Handschrift Khum. ins Jahr 1538 dadiert werden.
Nr. 4319–4719: Anton Lauterbachs Tagebuch aufs Jahr 1539.
Nr. 4720–4756: Tischreden, die in der Sammlung B. ins Jahr 1539 dadiert werden.
Nr. 4757–4857: Die Sammlung Khummer.
Nr. 4857a–4857p: Tischreden aus der Handschrift "Dresd. 1. 423" und aus dem 7. Abschnitt der Handschrift Math. L.
Nr. 4858–5341: Nachschriften von Johannes Mathesius 1540.

- WA TR 5. Tischreden aus den Jahren 1540–1544

Nr. 5342–5378: Tischreden aus dem Jahre 1540, die wahrscheinlich nicht von Johannes Mathesius nachgeschrieben sind.
Nr. 5379–5603: Kaspar Heydenreichs Nachschriften aus den Jahren 1542 und 1543
Nr. 5604–5658: Tischreden aus der Handschrift "Clm. 937".
Nr. 5659–5675: Hieronymus Besolds Nachschriften 1544
Nr. 5676–5749: Tischreden aus der Handschrift "Clm. 943".
Nr. 5750–5790: Tischreden aus der Handschrift "Clm. 939".
Nr. 5791–5824: Tischreden der Handschrift "Bav." und "Oben."
Nr. 5825–5889: Tischreden aus der Handschrift "Luth.-Mel."
Nr. 5890–5941: Tischreden aus der Handschrift "Wolf. 3232"
Nr. 5942–5989: Tischreden aus Georg Rörers Handschriftenbänden.
Nr. 5990–6507: Tischreden aus Anton Lauterbachs Sammlung "B."

- WA TR 6. Tischreden aus verschiedenen Jahren, aus Johannes Aurifabers Sammlung (i.e. from various years from the collection made by Johannes Aurifaber)

Nr. 6508–7075: Tischreden aus Johannes Aurifabers Sammlung (Abkürzung: FB) (i.e. Table talks from the collection made by Johannes Aurifaber (abbreviation: FB))

== German Bible ==
- WA DB 1. Vorstücke: Luthers eigenständige Niederschriften der Erstübersetzung (Altes Testament: Buch der Richter – Hohes Lied)
- WA DB 2. Vorstücke: Luthers eigenhändige Niederschriften der Erstübersetzung (Altes Testament: Propheten; Apokryphen: Weisheit Salomon; Sirach). Bibliographie der hochdeutschen Drucke von Luthers Bibelübersetzung 1522 – 1546
- WA DB 3. Eigenhändige Aufzeichnungen Luthers in sein Psalterhandexemplar von 1528. Text der Revisionsprotokolle zum Psalter 1531. Text der Bibelrevisionsprotokolle 1539–1541 und zeitgleiche handschriftliche Eintragungen Luthers in sein Handexemplar des Alten Testaments zu 1. Mose-Psalter
- WA DB 4. Bibelrevisionsprotokolle von 1540/1541 und 1544 (Schluß) und zeitgleiche Eintragungen in Handexemplaren zu Sprüche Salomonis – Offenbarung. Eintragungen in ein Exemplar des Neuen Testament 1530. Eintragungen in ein Exemplar der lateinischen Psalter-Ausgabe 1529
- WA DB 5. Die Luthervulgata (revidierte Vulgata Ausgabe von 1529): Pentateuch – 1. und 2. Buch der Könige; Neue Testament
- WA DB 6. Drucktext der Lutherbibel 1522–1546: Das Neue Testament. Erste Hälfte: Evangelien und Apostelgeschichte
- WA DB 7. Drucktext der Lutherbibel 1522–1546: Das Neue Testament. Zweite Hälfte: Episteln und Offenbarung
- WA DB 8. Drucktext der Lutherbibel 1546 und 1523: 1.–5. Mose
- WA DB 9. I. Drucktext der Lutherbibel 1546 und 1524: Buch Josua – 1. Buch der Könige
- WA DB 9. II. Drucktext der Lutherbibel 1546 und 1524: 2. Buch der Könige – Esther
- WA DB 10. I. Drucktext der Lutherbibel 1546 und früher: Buch Hiob und Psalter
- WA DB 10. II. Drucktext der Lutherbibel 1546 und früher: Sprüche Salomonis bis Hohelied Salomonis. Revidierte Ausgabe des lateinischen Psalters (1529 und 1537)
- WA DB 11. I. Drucktext der Lutherbibel 1546 und früher: Die Übersetzung des Prophetenteils des Alten Testaments (Die Propheten Jesaja bis Hesekiel)
- WA DB 11. II. Drucktext der Lutherbibel 1546 und früher: Die Übersetzung des Prophetenteils des Alten Testaments (Daniel bis Maleachi)
- WA DB 12. Drucktext der Lutherbibel 1546 und früher: Die Übersetzung des Apokryphenteils des Alten Testaments

== Correspondence ==
- WA BR 1. 1501 – 26.1.1520
- WA BR 2. 1520–1522
- WA BR 3. 1523–1525
- WA BR 4. 1526–1528
- WA BR 5. 1529–1530
- WA BR 6. 1531–1533
- WA BR 7. 1534–1536
- WA BR 8. 1537–1539
- WA BR 9. 1540 – 28. Februar 1542
- WA BR 10. 1. März 1542 – 31. Dezember 1544
- WA BR 11. 1. Januar 1545 – 3. März 1546
- WA BR 12. Nachträge
- WA BR 13. Nachträge und Berichtigungen. Synoptische Tabelle (i.e. Supplement and corrections; synoptic table)
- WA BR 14. Beschreibendes Handschriftenverzeichnis. Geschichte der Lutherbriefeditionen (nebst Bibliographie). Nachträge und Berichtigungen (i.e. Descriptive directory of manuscripts; History of editions of Luther's letters, with bibliography; supplement and corrections)
- WA BR 15. Personen- und Ortsregister (i.e. Index of persons and places)
- WA BR 16. Sonderregister "Luther". Korrespondentenverzeichnis. Bibelstellenregister. Zitatenregister (i.e. Special index "Luther" (to find passages about Luther and his acts in the correspondence); directory of correspondents; index of biblical passages; index of citations)
- WA BR 17. Theologisches und Sachregister (i.e. Theological and subject index)
- WA BR 18. Alphabetisches Verzeichnis der Textanfänge. Letzte Nachlese (i.e. alphabetical directory of first lines of the texts; final supplement)

== Bibliography ==
Editions

- Luther, Martin: D. Martin Luthers Werke. 120 vols. Weimar, 1883–2009
- Luther, Martin: D. Martin Luthers Werke. CD-ROM: ISBN 0-85964-464-2
- online here at archive.org via lutherdansk.dk: D. Martin Luthers Werke, Weimarer Ausgabe

Companion volumes to the Weimar edition of Luther's works

- D. Martin Luthers Werke. Sonderedition der kritischen Weimarer Ausgabe. Begleitheft zu den Tischreden: ISBN 3-7400-0947-0 (accompanying booklet to the division "Table talk")
- D. Martin Luthers Werke. Sonderedition der kritischen Weimarer Ausgabe. Begleitheft zur Deutschen Bibel: ISBN 3-7400-0948-9 (accompanying booklet to the division "German Bible")
- D. Martin Luthers Werke. Sonderedition der kritischen Weimarer Ausgabe. Begleitheft zum Briefwechsel: ISBN 3-7400-0949-7 (accompanying booklet to the division "Correspondence")
- D. Martin Luthers Werke. Sonderedition der kritischen Weimarer Ausgabe. Begleitheft zu den Schriften: ISBN 3-7400-0946-2 (accompanying booklet to the division "Writings / Works")
- Aland, Kurt: Hilfsbuch zum Lutherstudium: ISBN 3-7858-0153-X (conversion lists to find quotes from other editions of Luther's works in the Weimar edition of Luther's works)

== See also ==
- Johannes Aurifaber
- Martin Luther
- Martin Luther (resources)
