= Rorer =

Rorer or Rörer may refer to:

== People ==
- Georg Rörer (1492–1557), Lutheran reformer and pastor
- Posey Rorer (1891–1936), American fiddler
- Sarah Tyson Rorer (1849–1937), American pioneer in the field of domestic science
- Rorer A. James (1859–1921), U.S. Representative from Virginia

== Other uses ==
- Rorer, a pharmaceutical company founded in 1910 and acquired by Rhône-Poulenc in 1990
- Rorer, West Virginia, United States, an unincorporated community
