= Johannes Crato von Krafftheim =

German humanist and court physician

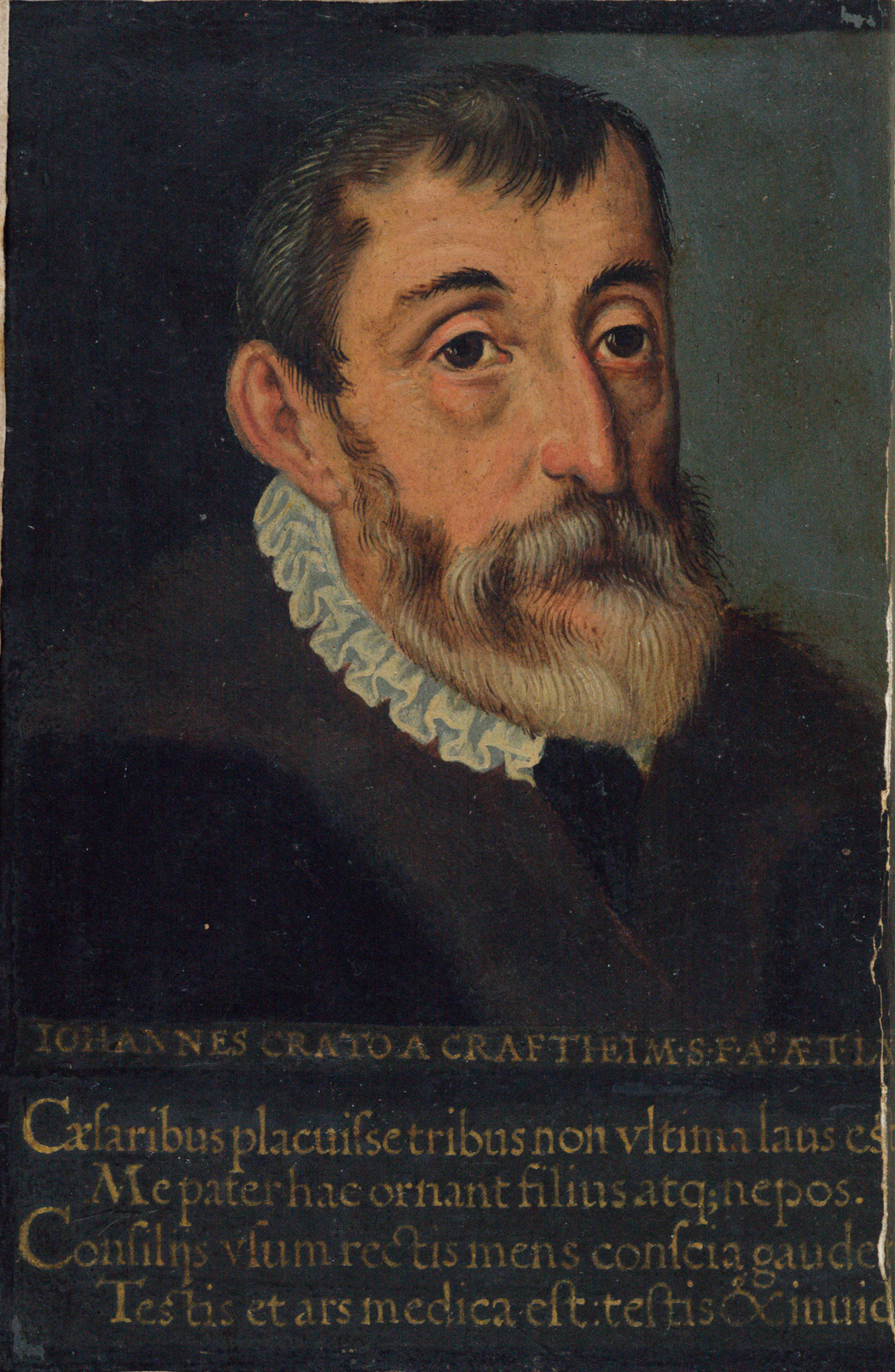
- Portrait of Johannes Crato von Krafftheim at the age of 60
- Born: Johannes Krafft; 22 November 1519; Breslau
- Died: 19 October 1585 (aged 65); Breslau
- Occupation: Physician

Academic background
- Education: University of Wittenberg; University of Padua
- Academic advisor: Johannes Baptista Montanus

Johannes Crato von Krafftheim (born Johannes Krafft; 22 November 1519 – 19 October 1585) was a humanist and court physician to three Holy Roman emperors.

== Origins and education ==
Crato von Krafftheim was born Johannes Krafft. He was the son of the artisan and council leader Christoph Krafft and a student at the Breslau (Wrocław) Gymnasium of St. Elisabeth and Mary Magdalene. On account of his prodigious academic talent, the city council of Breslau bestowed a 20 Gulden fellowship upon Crato, with further benefactions of the Breslau patrician families, to continue his studies at the university level.

== Studies and residency in Wittenberg ==
From 1535 onwards, Crato studied theology and lived six years in the household of Martin Luther in the University of Wittenberg. He also lived for some time at 17 Burgermeisterstrasse. He also became acquainted with Philipp Melanchthon there and under his influence engaged in an in depth study of classical languages. Crato took his M.A. in 1542. He kept a diary during his time in Wittenberg which was used as a source for Johannes Aurifaber's influential edition of Luther's Table Talk (Colloquia oder Tischreden Doctor Martini Lutheri).

On Luther's suggestion, who did not think Crato well suited for a theological career, Crato decided to study medicine. He served briefly in this time as the tutor to the Counts of Wertheim in Leipzig. Also in this era, he developed a close relationship with Joachim Camerarius the Younger.

== Medical studies and residency in Italy ==
With the support of the Breslau city council and the recommendation of Philipp Melanchthon and Joachim Camerarius the elder, Crato studied medicine at the University of Padua from 1546. He was a student of the famous medical professor Johannes Baptista Montanus, who exercised a decisive influence on Crato's first works. Crato completed his medical studies by taking his doctorate and undertook a tour of Italy with his friends Johann Baptist Hainzel und Paul Hainzel. He briefly practiced medicine in Verona.

== Medical practice and later life ==
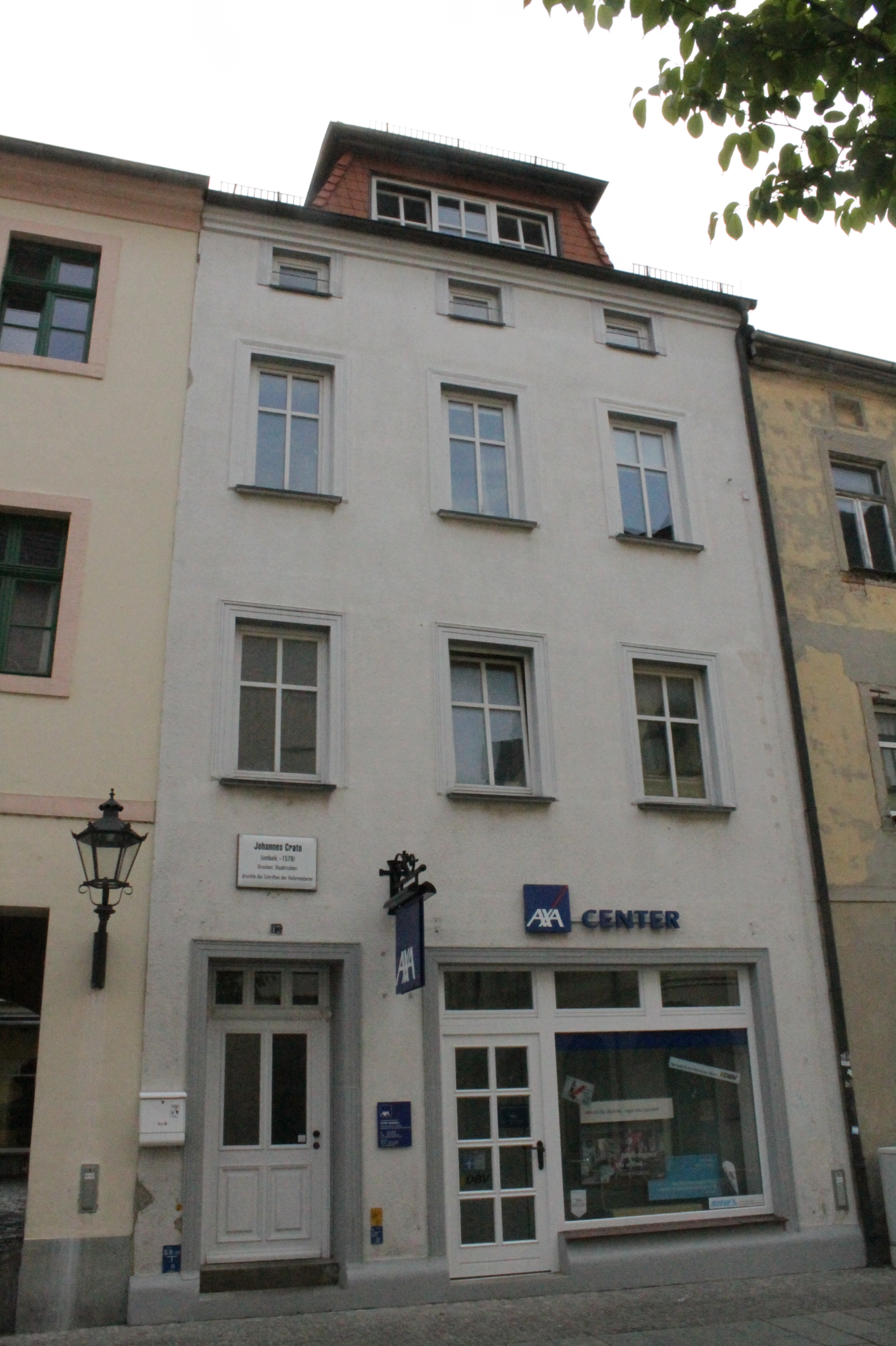
Crato's house, 17 Judenstrasse in Wittenberg

In 1550 Crato returned to his hometown Breslau where he was named the second town physician. That year he married the daughter of the city secretary Johannes Scharf von Werd and began his family. The marriage produced one son and two daughters.

Crato proved his value to the city during his service in the Plague epidemic of 1554, as he had previously composed a "Pestordnung" in 1553. The city compensated him with a yearly salary of 100 Thalers as a reward for his sacrificial service. He was charged with the treatment of public servants and poor students.

Although his fame as a physician was spreading almost across Germany, the reigning city council leader Hans Morenberger removed him from his post as physician to the poor because Crato was suspected of being a Calvinist. His prior conversion from Catholicism to the Protestant faith had increased suspicions in Crato's beliefs.

In 1560 Crato was called to the imperial court in Vienna to become personal physician to Emperor Ferdinand I. As the emperor's health declined, Crato resettled to Vienna; however, he and his family returned to Breslau after Emperor Ferdinand died in 1564. In the next year, however, he was named principal personal physician of Emperor Maximilian II, whom he served for 11 years.

In 1567 Maximilian II, who paid Crato exorbitantly and lavished honors upon him, ennobled Crato and a year later raised him to the rank of "Count Palatine." In his position as an imperial count palatine, Crato bestowed patents of nobility on:

- Johann Woyssel, Vienna, 1 May 1569
- Martin Weinrich, 1583; Professor at the Elisabeth-Gymnasium in Breslau
- Lorenz Scholz von Rosenau, 1585

The emperor placed great trust in him, which Crato in turn used on behalf of the Calvinists and the Bohemian Brethren/Unitas Fratrum. On this account the court Jesuits were not able to secure Maximilian's support for the active suppression of Protestantism. As a representative of an irenic Melanchthonian-Calvinist orientation, Crato struggled against the Gnesio-Lutheran followers of Matthias Flacius Illyricus

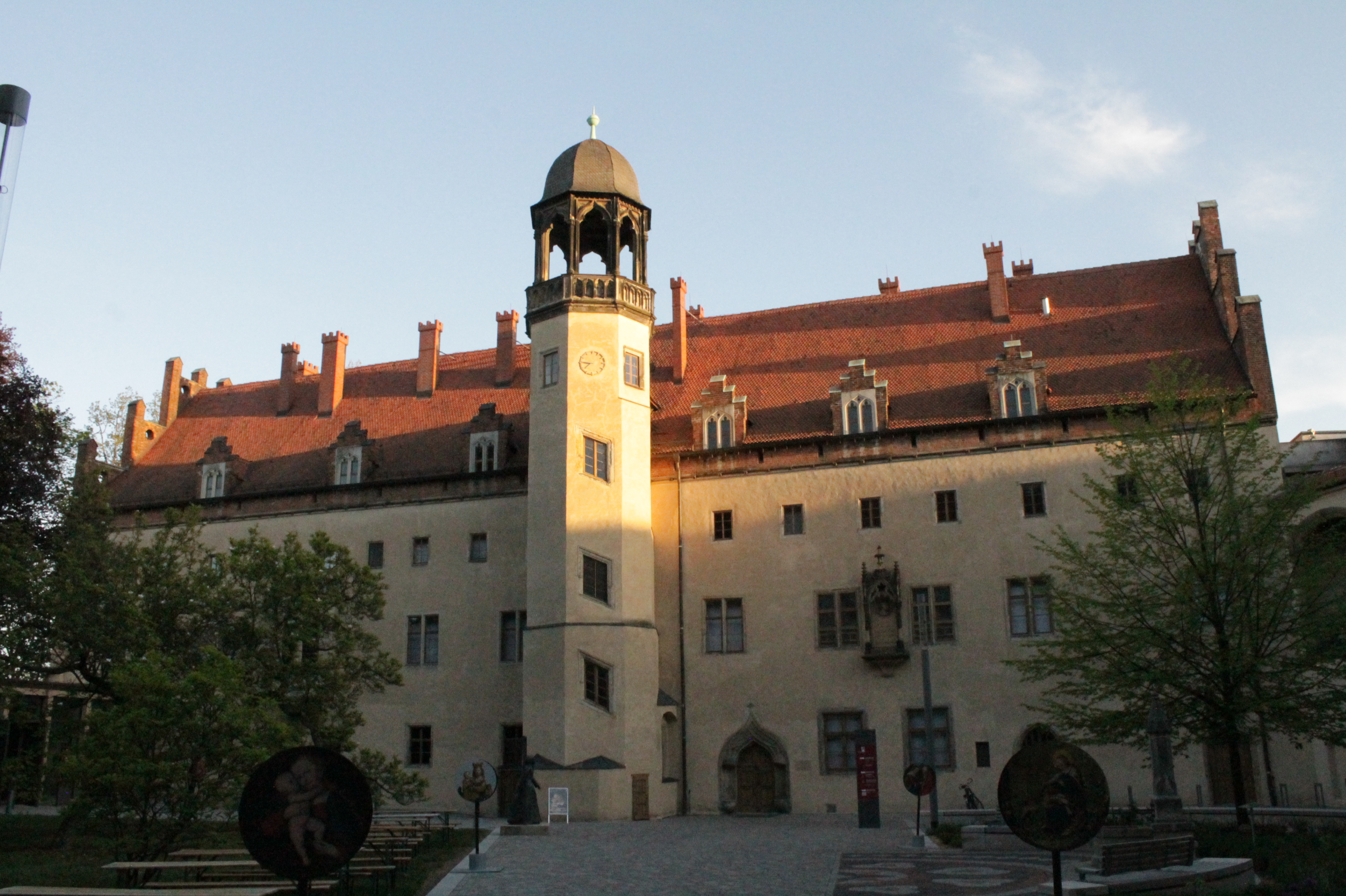
Luther's house and college rooms in Wittenberg

As a prominent representative of Humanist "school" medicine, Crato suffered a severe professional embarrassment when an unlearned female practitioner was called in to serve at the death bed of the emperor. After Maximilian's death, Crato was released - like all the Protestants - from imperial service, and he returned to Breslau.

However, already in 1577 Crato was called to the court again to serve as physician to the sickly Emperor Rudolph II. Although he was himself ill, he moved to Prague again in 1578 to be near the emperor. He soon suffered under the growing influence of the Jesuits, and he endeavored to secure his release from court. He secured his release in the fall of 1581, and he retired to his estate Rückers in the County of Glatz, then an integral dominion of the Bohemian crown, which he had acquired in 1567. He founded a Reformed Protestant community there with a church and a pastor. He intended to spend the remainder of his life there and had his library shipped in from Prague.

Crato befriended some of the leading intellectuals of his time including Camerarius, Volcher Coiter, Henri Estienne, Thomas Erastus, Konrad Gessner, Paulo Aldo Manutio II, Johannes Sambucus, Piero Vettori, and Theodor Zwinger, Georg Joachim Rheticus among others. His Silesian protégés included Zacharias Ursinus, Jakob Monau, Peter Monau, and Lorenz Scholz von Rosenau.

Desiring the stimulation of the scholarly life, he returned to Breslau in 1583 and handed his manor over to his son. Despite his age and illness, he worked again in Breslau as a plague physician for the common townsfolk. His wife died of the pestilence. He followed her on 19 October 1585.

His son Johann Baptist von Krafftheim inherited his Rückers manor. He was married to Anna von Heugel, who received the estate upon Johann Baptist's death.

== The first known written autopsy ==
Crato and court surgeon Peter Suma, performed the first autopsy documented in writing on October 13, 1576 in Regensburg on the deceased Emperor Maximilian II. The autopsy report was signed by the Regensburg physician Fabricius and authenticated by the notary Linda. The internal organs of the emperor were placed in a gold-plated copper pot that was buried on the left side of the high altar in the Regensburg Cathedral. Today there is a memorial stone inscribed with the imperial crown of Maximilian and the monogram of the year 1576 at this spot. The heart of the emperor was placed in a precious box put back in his body inside the coffin. Whether this was an autopsy in a scientific and anatomical sense is questionable. The practice was used mainly for preparing the body for the religious purposes in order to leave a part of the body remaining in the place in which one possessed a special relationship.

== Works ==
- Idea doctrinae Hippocraticae. 1554
- Methodus therapeutica ex Galeni et J. B. Montani sententia. Basel, 1555
- Ordnung der preservation ... wider die Pestilenz, Breslau, 1555. [VD16 C 5719] / Digital edition from 1585 by the University and State Library Düsseldorf
- Isagoge medicinae. Venice, 1560
- Johannis Cratonis Wratislaviensis in Cl. Galeni divinos libros Methodi therapeutices Perioche Methodica. Basel, 1563
- De morbo gallico commentarius. Frankfurt, 1564
- Mikrotechne, seu parva ars medicinalis.
- Commentarii de vera praecavandi et curandi febrem pestilentem contagiosam ratione (translated by Martin Weinreich)
- Consilia et Epistolae medicinales. 1591, 1592, 1593, etc.
