= Monau =

Monau is a German surname. Notable people with the surname include:

- Jakob Monau (1546–1603), German polymath
- Peter Monau (1551–1588), Czech medical doctor
