= Lorenz Scholz von Rosenau =

German botanist and physician

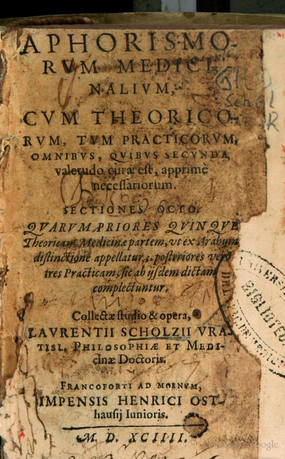
Aphorismorum Medicinalium ..., 1589

Lorenz Scholz von Rosenau, also Laurentius Scholzius (20 September 1552 – 22 April 1599) was a German botanist and physician.

== Life ==
He was born in Breslau, the son of a Breslau pharmacist with the same name. After a classical education at the Elisabeth school in Breslau, Scholz attended the University of Wittenberg from 1572 to 1576. There and in Padua and Bologna, cities with well-established botanical gardens, he studied medicine and other sciences.

In 1579 he undertook an educational grand tour of Italy with his countrymen Niklas von Rhediger, Johann Matthäus Wacker von Wackenfels und Martin Schilling. He and Schilling separated from the group in Milan and traveled to southern France, where he took his doctorate at the University of Valence.

In 1580 he was back in Breslau where he remained permanently from 1585 until his death. He previously practised medicine in Schwiebus and Freystadt in Silesia. After returning to Silesia, Scholz married Sara Aurifaber, the daughter of a Breslau pastor. He worked intensively in research on the plague and wrote a Pestordnung, printed 1581 in Breslau. In 1585 Johannes Crato von Krafftheim bestowed a coat of arms on Scholz in Crato's capacity as an imperial count palatine. In recognition of his successful efforts against the plague, he was elevated to the Bohemian peerage with the title "Scholz von Rosenau" in 1596. Scholz succumbed to tuberculosis 1599.

He became famous through the translation and publication of writings of famous Greek and Arab medical writers, as well as contemporary physicians. To these contributions he added his own Aphorismorum medicinalium cum theoreticorum tum practicorum sectiones VIII of 1589, a reference work of the collected medical knowledge of his age.

As a botanist, Scholz was particularly interested the newly introduced exotic plants from Asia and Americas, which he cultivated from 1587 in prodigious quantities in his garden in Breslau. He commissioned the Breslau painter Georg Freyberger to produce an illustrated catalog; he wrote two plant inventories, which were printed in 1587 and 1594 in Breslau. Scholz's garden covered an area of about three hectares and was divided into four quadrants by a central pathway. In the middle of the garden was a building that served as an art gallery and dining room. Here he organized cheerful flower festivals to which he invited selected individuals. He also cultivated potatoes in his garden.

== Works ==
- Aphorismorum Medicinalium ... Breslau: Per Haeredes Iohannis Scharffenbergij, 1589 (VD 16 S 3823).
- Catalogus arborum, fruticum et plantarum. Breslau: (Georg Baumann d.J.), 1594 (VD 16 S 3824).
- Consiliorum Medicinalium, conscriptum a praestantiss. atque exercitatiss. nostrorum temporum medicis, liber singulis.... Nunc primum studio & opera, Laurentii Scholzii a Rozenaw med. Vratisl. hoc modo in lucem editus. Frankfurt: Apud Andreae Wecheli haeredes, Claudium Marnium & Joan. Aubrium, 1598 (VD 16 S 3825).
- Epistolarum Philosophicarum: medicinalium, ac chymicarum a summis nostrae aetatis philosophis ac medicis exaraturum, volumen ... Nunc primum labore, ac industria, Laurentii Scholzii a Rozenaw ... foras datum. Frankfurt: Apud Andreae Wecheli haeredes, Claudium Marnium & Joan. Aubrium, 1598 (VD 16 S 3826).
- In Laurentii Scholzii Medici Wratisl. Hortum Epigrammata Amicorum Breslau, 1594 (VD 16 S 3827).
