= Wacker von Wackenfels =

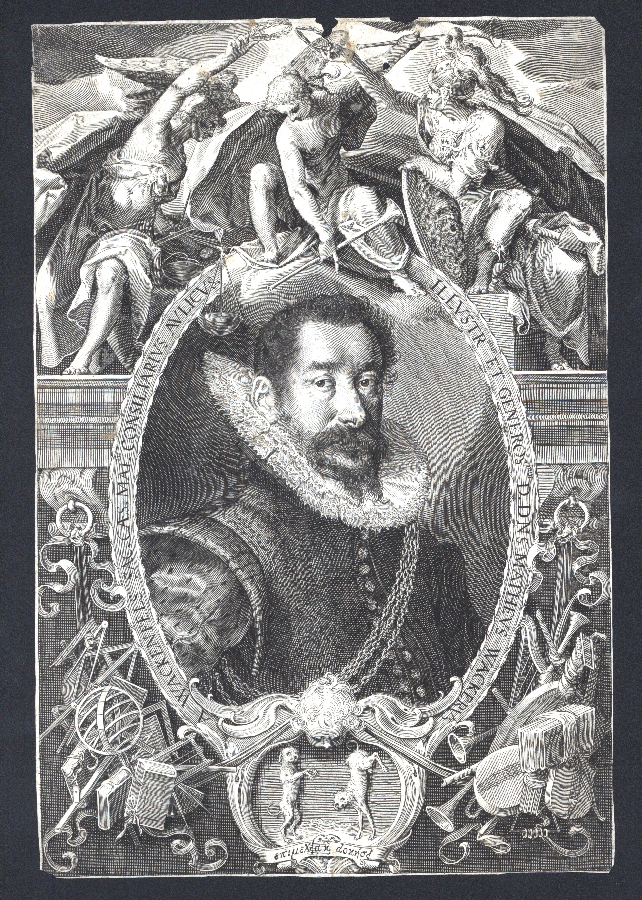
A portrait of Wacker von Wackenfels

Johannes Matthaeus Wacker von Wackenfels (1550–1619) was an active diplomat, scholar and writer, with an avid interest in history and philosophy. A follower of Neostoicism, he sought to resolve the doubts he still had about his conversion to Catholicism, according to STUDIA RUDOLPHINA - Bulletin of the Research Center for Visual Arts and Culture in the Age of Rudolf II. He was born in Konstanz (Constance) in 1550 in a Lutheran Protestant family and studied in Strasbourg, Geneva and Padua. He was supported and promoted by Johannes Crato von Krafftheim, who put his way into the circle of Renaissance humanism in Northern Europe in Breslau (Wrocław). On Crato's and Hubert Languet's recommendation, he became tutor in noble houses. In 1574 he traveled from Vienna to Italy, where he met Jakob Monau and Fabier Ien de Dohna. In 1575 he received his doctorate in Padua. As a steward, he accompanied the son of Nicholas of Rhediger on the Grand Tour (peregrinatio Academica). In 1576 he returned to Breslau and became the confidant of bishop Andreas von Jerin. In 1591 Wackenfels was Chancellor of the Upper Silesian provincial team. In 1583 he married Sophie Poley in Dresden (1563-92), a sister of Wrocław businessman and gentleman on animal garden Christoph Poley. In 1592 Wackenfels converted to the Catholic faith and in 1594, he was in the Ennoblement. In 1595 he married his second wife Catherine of Troilo, being then Franz Troilo's brother-in-law, a sister of his first wife and second daughter of Johann Franz Troilo, and allied himself with one of the most influential families in Wrocław. In the spring of the same year, he made an invitation to his friend Valens Acidalius to go to Neisse. In 1597, he was appointed to the Aulic Council, where he served until 1612, from 1608 as a trainee. In 1611 he has devoted his friend Johannes Kepler, who dedicated to him his "Strena seu nive sexangula" (From hexagonal snow; see: Kepler conjecture) (1611).

== Works ==
Wackenfels wrote courtly poems and his manuscripts contain many philological and historical studies (examples:- "Dissertatio de nummo Ptolomaei" - which he also illustrated, presently held at the Öesterreichische Nationalbiliothek in Vienna, various philosophical treatises and "De cruce et fruce veterum" - known only from correspondence).

Vota aulica super illustrissima ducum Saxoniae controversia de jure praecedentiae in dignitate et successione . Frankfurt / M. 1619 (together with Johann Müller Hegen).

== Sources ==
Colmar Grünhagen: "Wacken Rock, Johann Matthaeus Wacker from". In: Allgemeine Deutsche Biographie (ADB). Volume 40, Duncker & Humblot, Leipzig, 1896, pp. 448 f.

Conrad, climb, p 282f., 1571st Mountain weapons.
