= Gruenhagen =

Gruenhagen, Grünhagen is a German surname. Notable people with the surname include:

- Colmar Grünhagen (1828–1911), German archivist and historian
- Glenn Gruenhagen (born 1952), American politician from Minnesota
- Kerry Gruenhagen (born c. 1970), American politician from Iowa
