= Weimarer =

Weimarer may refer to:

- Weimarer Ausgabe, the German name for the Weimar edition of Martin Luther's works
- Weimarer Land, a district in the east of Thuringia, Germany
- Weimarer Republik, the German name for the Weimar Republic, a parliamentary republic in Germany from 1919 to 1933
