= Johannes Mathesius =

German Lutheran reformer (1504–1565)

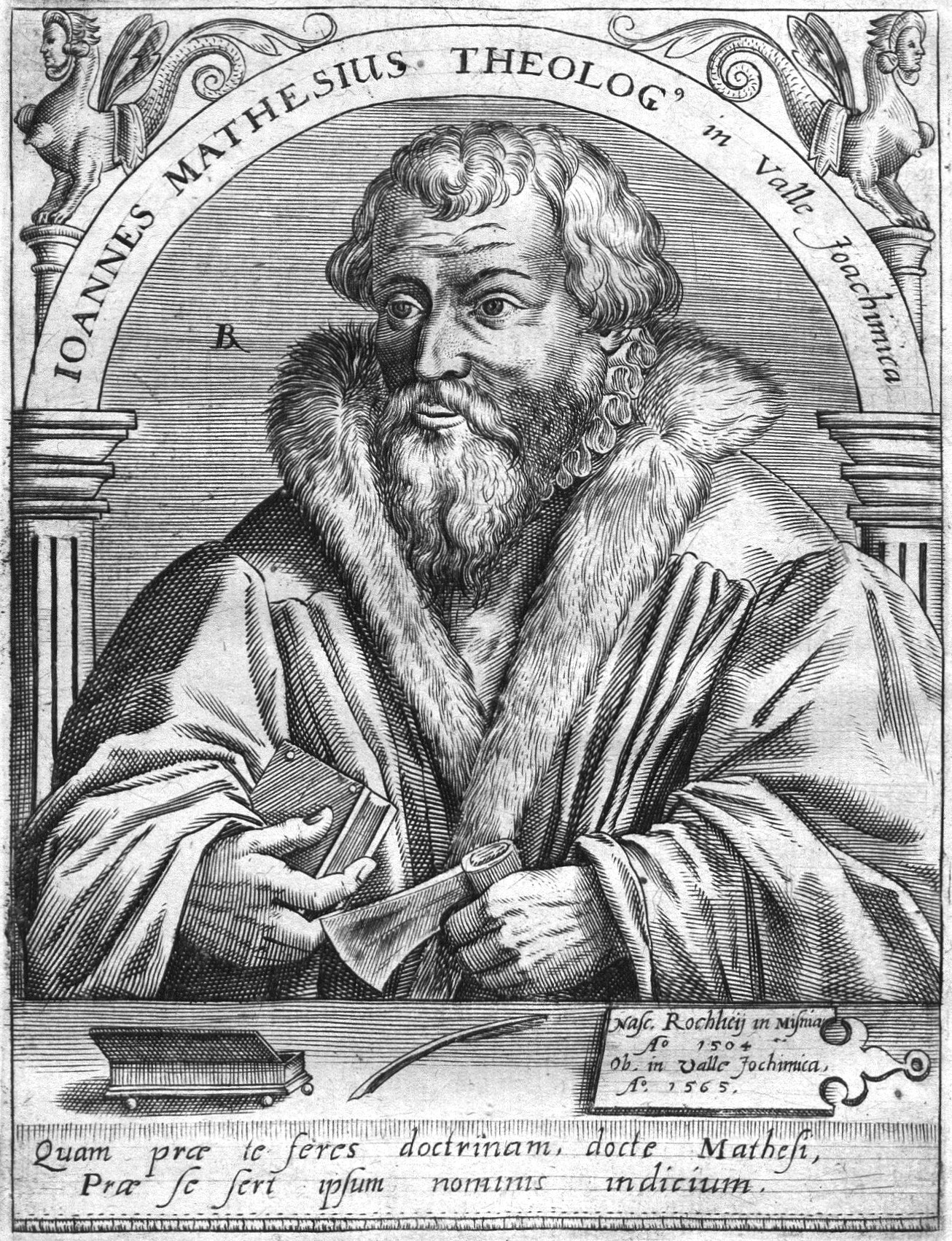
Johannes Mathesius (1504–1565)

Johannes Mathesius (June 24, 1504 – October 7, 1565), also called Johann Mathesius or John Mathesius, was a German minister and a Lutheran reformer. He is best known for his compilation of Martin Luther's Table Talk, or notes taken of Luther's conversation and published afterwards. He rivaled Anton Lauterbach in his diligence in notetaking, and surpassed him in the discrimination with which he arranged it.

== Biography ==
Mathesius was born in Rochlitz, where his father was a councillor. During 1523–1525 he studied at Ingolstadt, from whence he drifted into Bavaria, where he became converted to the Protestant cause. The renown of Luther and Melanchthon drew him to Wittenberg in 1529, but he did not, at this time, come into close relations with his teachers. In 1530 he was called as Baccalaureus to the school at Altenberg, and in 1532 was promoted to the headmastership of the Latin school at Joachimsthal, a mining town which had recently sprung up. In 1540 a lucky speculation in mines let him realize his ambition of a clerical calling, and he became a theological student at Wittenberg. The recommendations of Justus Jonas and Georg Rörer got him the prized honor of a seat at Luther's table.

It is not known exactly how long Mathesius was Luther's guest, but it was probably no longer than the period of May to November 1540 covered by his notes of the Table Talk. He left Luther's house because he had collected pupils to tutor; at first Luther boarded as many as four of Mathesius's pupils, but Luther had to draw the line somewhere, so eventually Mathesius had to leave and take his pupils with him. Mathesius took the degree of master in September 1540, spent nineteen months more in study, and then returned to Joachimsthal as deacon. He revisited Luther in the spring of 1545 and later became pastor of the church at Joachimsthal until his death. During his later life he made a collection of Table Talk taken down by others, and added them to his own.

== Luther's Table Talk ==
Mathesius spoke enthusiastically of the privilege of eating with Luther and hearing him converse. He stated that Luther's disciples would not speak until spoken to, and that then it was usually Schiefer who answered for the company. Earlier notetakers had written down only the serious remarks of Luther, but Mathesius also wrote down the facetious or even damaging remarks, a sign of the increasing reverence in which Luther was held. He was the first to publish an edition of Luther's Table Talk.

== Mineralogy ==
Mathesius was also a mineralogist and a colleague of Georg Agricola "the father of mineralogy" who also lived in Joachimsthal. He was the first to describe any form of tourmaline in detail. In 2013, a newly discovered mineral from Jáchymov (St Joachimsthal) was named mathesiusite in his honor and a detailed description was published in 2014.
