= Jakob Monau =

Polish lawyer, linguist and poet

Jakob Monau, also known as Jacobus Monavius or Iacobus Monaw (4 February 1546 – 6 October 1603), was a lawyer, linguist and poet. He was leader of the Reformed Protestant faction in Breslau after Johannes Crato von Krafftheim's death.

== Biography ==
Jakob Monau was born on 4 February 1546 in Breslau. He was a student at St. Elizabeth and Mary Magdalene Gymnasium in Breslau. Thanks to patrons who supported him financially, he matriculated at the University of Leipzig in the summer of 1562. Like his early mentors Joachim Camerarius and Victorinus Strigel, Monau initially identified with the Philippist Lutheran faction although, like many Philippists, in time he moved toward a Reformed Protestant theological position. After 1569 he moved to Frankfurt (Oder), Wittenberg, Heidelberg, Tübingen and then again to Wittenberg. In winter 1573, he was to have enrolled at the University of Jena and appears to have enrolled at the University of Padua later that year. In 1574 he was in Geneva and in 1575 again in Heidelberg.

Despite his great learning, he was not favored in Breslau because of his inclination toward the Reformed faith. In 1590 he was Councilor of Duke Frederick of Legnica and Brzeg, while he continued to reside in Breslau. He was a friend of Johannes Crato von Krafftheim and a member of Breslau intellectual circles. By his second marriage, he was related to the families Vogt, Pucher, Holzbecher und Heugel. He had three sons, including Frederick Monau with whom the family line died out. His brother was the noted imperial physician Peter Monau.

Together with his friend Wacker von Wackenfels he convinced Abraham Ortelius to create a map of Utopia. Ortelius dedicated his map of historic Germany to him.

He died on 6 October 1603 in Breslau.

== Literature ==
- Adolf Schimmelpfennig (1885). "Monau, Jakob" . Allgemeine Deutsche Biographie (in German). Vol. 22. Leipzig: Duncker & Humblot. pp. 162–163.
