= Mathesiusite =

Uranyl vanadate-sulfate mineral

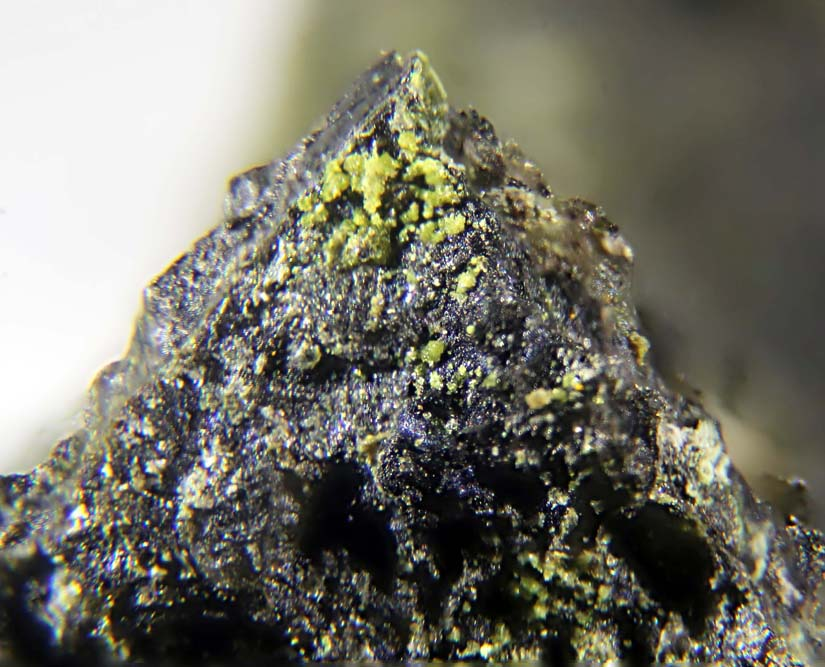
- Yellow microcrystals of the extremely rare uranium mineral mathesiusite (IMA 2013-046) from one of the only two known localities worldwide: North Mesa Mine group, Temple Mountain, Emery County, Utah, United States of America.

General
- Category: Sulfate mineral
- Formula: K_{5}(UO_{2})_{4}(SO_{4})_{4}(VO_{5})·4(H_{2}O)
- IMA symbol: Mhe
- Strunz classification: 7.DG.
- Crystal system: Tetragonal
- Crystal class: P4/n

Identification
- Color: Yellowish green
- Crystal habit: Needles <0.2 mm in length
- Cleavage: Perfect {010}, good {001}
- Fracture: Irregular/uneven
- Tenacity: Brittle
- Mohs scale hardness: 2
- Streak: Greenish white
- Specific gravity: 4.02 (calculated)
- Optical properties: Uniaxial (−)
- Refractive index: nω = 1.634() nε = 1.597(3)
- Birefringence: δ = 0.037
- Other characteristics: Radioactive

Mathesiusite is a sulfate mineral containing potassium, vanadium, and uranium and has the chemical formula: K_{5}(UO_{2})_{4}(SO_{4})_{4}(VO_{5})·4(H_{2}O). It is a secondary mineral formed during post-mining processes.

It was discovered in the Jáchymov mining district, Czech Republic and named in 2013 after Johannes Mathesius (1504–1565), who studied minerals from the area (known then as Joachimsthal, Bohemia).
