= Joachim Camerarius the Younger =

German scientist (1534–1598)

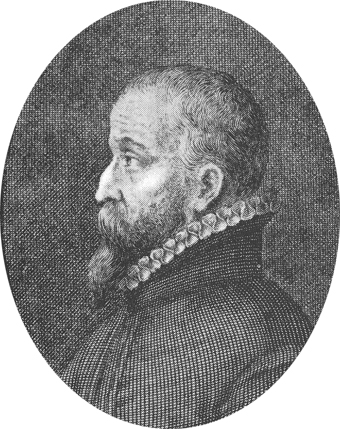
Joachim Camerarius the Younger.

Joachim Camerarius the Younger (German "Kammermeister") (6 November 1534 – 11 October 1598, Nuremberg) was a German physician, botanist, zoologist and humanist scholar.

== Life ==
He was born in Nuremberg, the son of the famed humanist Joachim Camerarius the elder (1500–1574). The younger Camerarius’s association with the luminaries of later sixteenth-century German intelligentsia was secured by his father’s network of influential friends—including Philip Melanchthon and Johannes Crato von Krafftheim. After his early studies at Wittenberg and Leipzig, Camerarius turned to medical pursuits under the tutelage of Crato. Following in Crato’s footsteps, he pursued medical studies at the University of Padua before taking his doctorate at the University of Bologna in 1562. He returned to Nuremberg where he established his medical practice. In 1592 the Nuremberg city council established the Collegium Medicum. Camerarius served as dean of the medical college until his death. He corresponded with such notables as Gaspard Bauhin, Carolus Clusius, Thomas Erastus, and Konrad Gessner.

== Works ==
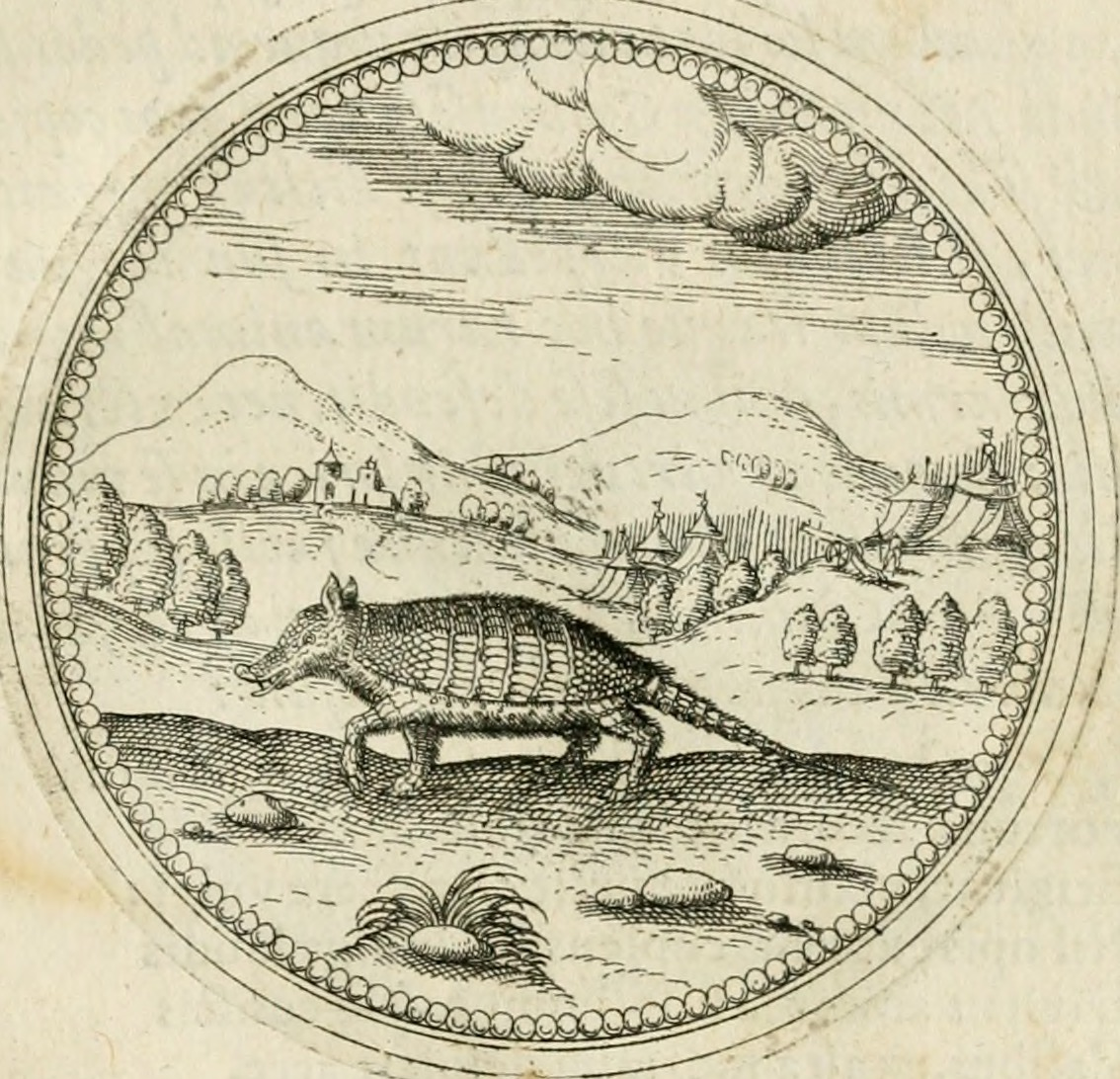
Symbolorvm and emblematvm

Though trained in the strict Galenic school of philosophically based medicine, Camerarius also displayed the naturalistic proclivity of his exemplars Gessner and Pietro Andrea Mattioli. His works include a Synopsis [...] commentariorum de peste (which includes his own De recta et necessaria ratione, praeservandi a pestis contagio) (Nuremberg, 1583), Hortus Medicus et Philosophicus (Frankfurt/M., 1598) and Symbola et emblemata (Centuria, I: 1590, II: 1595, III :1596, IV: 1604; ed. Wolfgang Harms and Ulla-Britta Kuechen, Graz, 1988). His son Ludwig Camerarius (1573–1651) brought out a posthumous edition of this work that added a fourth “century” of symbols and emblems drawn from aquatic animals and reptiles to the three previously published “centuries” taken from herbs and plants, four-legged animals, and birds and insects. Joachim Camerarius also published a very popular edition of Mattioli’s commentaries on Dioscorides (Kreutterbuch, Frankfurt/M., 1586, etc.).

=== List ===
- Camerarius, Joachim (1588), Hortus medicus et philosophicus in quo plurimorum stirpium brevis descriptio. Frankfurt: S. Feyerabend, H. Dack, & P. Fischer
