= Joannes Aurifaber Vratislaviensis =

German Lutheran theologian and Protestant reformer

Joannes Aurifaber Vratislaviensis (30 January 1517 – 19 October 1568), born Johann Goldschmidt in Breslau, was a Lutheran theologian and Protestant reformer. He adopted the cognomen Vratislaviensis ("of Breslau") to distinguish himself from another writer of his time, the Joannes Aurifaber from Weimar.

== Life ==
Joannes Aurifaber Vratislaviensis was the younger brother of the physician Andreas Aurifaber. He was educated at Wittenberg, where he formed a close and lasting friendship with Philipp Melanchthon. After graduating in 1538, he spent twelve years as docent at the university, and having then received his doctorate of divinity, was appointed professor of divinity and pastor of the church of St. Nicholas at Rostock. He distinguished himself by his conciliatory disposition, earned the special confidence of John Albert I, Duke of Mecklenburg, and took a leading part in 1552 in drawing up the constitution of the Mecklenburg church. He also settled some religious disputes in the town of Lübeck.

In 1553 Albert, Duke of Prussia, anxious to heal the differences in the Prussian church caused by the discussion of Andreas Osiander's doctrines, invited Aurifaber to Königsberg, and in the following year appointed him professor of divinity at the Königsberg Albertina University and president of the Samland diocese. Aurifaber, however, found it impossible to conciliate all parties, and in 1565 returned to Breslau, where, in 1567, he became pastor in the church of St. Elizabeth and inspector of the Lutheran churches and schools.

== Literature ==
- Gustav Hammann (1953). "Aurifaber, Johann". Neue Deutsche Biographie (in German). Vol. 1. Berlin: Duncker & Humblot. p. 456.
- Walter Friedensburg: Geschichte der Universität Wittenberg, Halle (Saale) 1917
- Robert Stupperich: Reformatorenlexikon. Verlag Max Mohn, Gütersloh 1984, ISBN 3-579-00123-X
- Wagenmann, Gustav Kawerau: Aurifaber, Johannes (Vratislaviensis). In: Realenzyklopädie für protestantische Theologie und Kirche (RE), 3. Auflage, Bd. 2, (1897), S. 288-290
