= Valentinus Lublinus =

Polish physician and medical text editor

Valentinus Lublinus, also known as Walenty Lublin, was a 16th-century Polish physician and editor of medical texts. He was a student of Johannes Baptista Montanus at the University of Padua, and collected, edited and published several volumes of his teacher's lectures two years after Montanus's death. One of these volumes was "explanations" of Galen, published in 1556.

The surname Lublinus indicates that he was from Lublin, a center of literary and intellectual activity during the Polish Renaissance. Lublinus's Latinized name also sometimes appears with the cognomen Polonus, an additional toponym to indicate that he was from Poland.
