= Johannes Baptista Montanus =

Italian physician (1489–1551)

Giovanni Battista da Monte
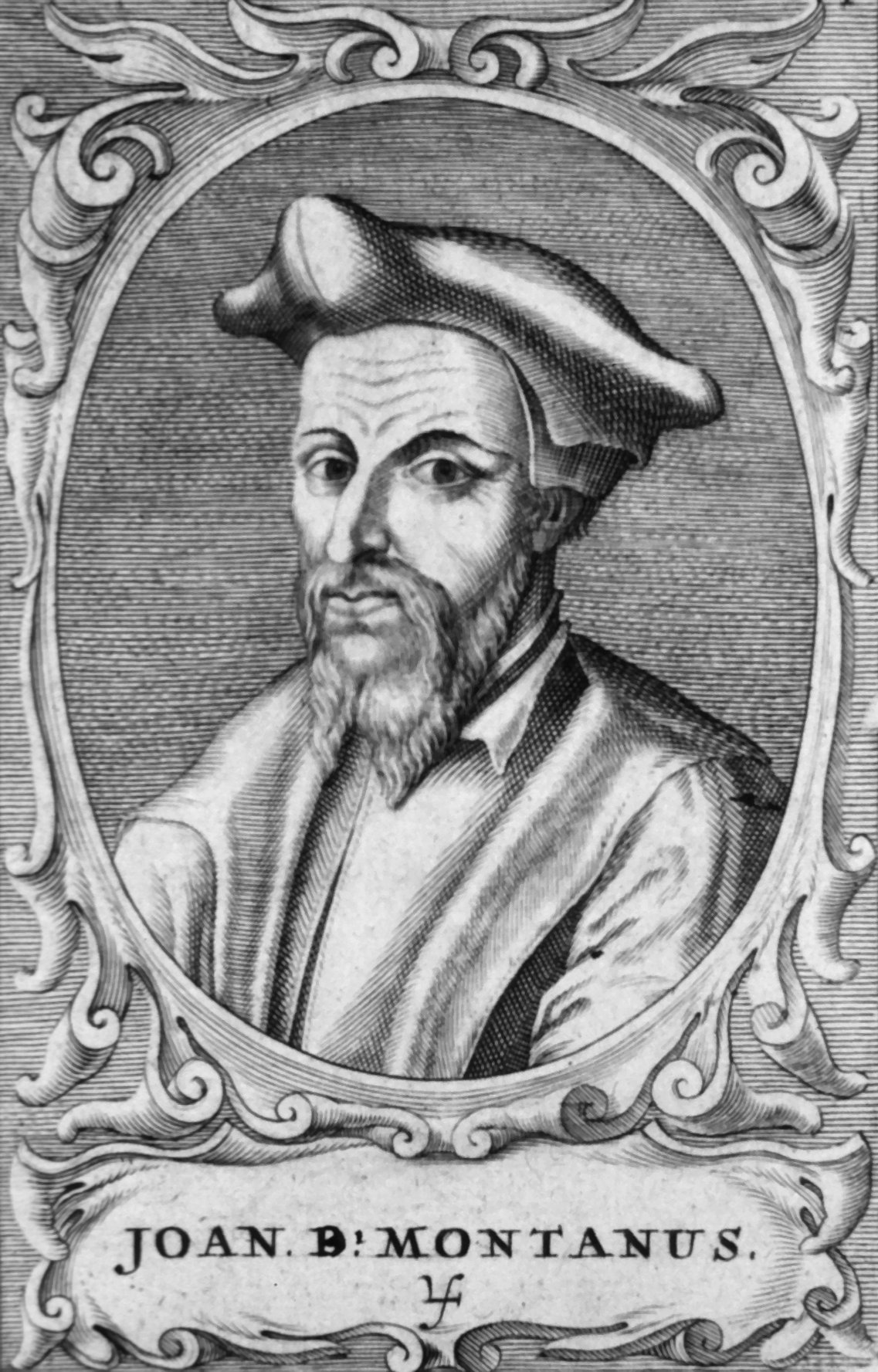
- Born: Giovanni Battista Monte; 1498; Verona
- Died: 6 May 1551 (aged 52–53); Padua
- Education: University of Ferrara
- Known for: Clinical medicine
- Scientific career
- Fields: Medicine
- Workplaces: University of Ferrara; University of Padua
- Academic advisors: Niccolò Leoniceno; Marco Musuro; Pietro Pomponazzi
- Doctoral students: John Caius; Johannes Crato von Krafftheim
- Other notable students: Bassiano Landi

Johannes Baptista Montanus (/mɒnˈteɪnəs/; 1498 – 6 May 1551) is the Latinized name of Giovanni Battista Monte, or Gian Battista da Monte, one of the leading Renaissance humanist physicians of Italy. Montanus promoted the revival of Greek medical texts and practice, producing revisions of Galen as well as of Islamic medical texts by Rhazes and Avicenna. He was himself a medical writer and was regarded as a second Galen.

== Biography ==
Montanus was born in Verona, and became a friend of the pioneering anatomist Andreas Vesalius. He introduced autopsies as a means of acquiring anatomical data, and established the first permanent anatomical theatre, where Vesalius, Gabriele Falloppio, Hieronymus Fabricius and others carried out studies.

Montanus became a professor of practical medicine at the University of Ferrara and at the University of Padua in 1539. His greatest innovation was to introduce clinical medicine into the curriculum as a way to integrate medical theory and practice. His students included John Caius, one of the most eminent physicians of the 16th century and a court physician of Edward VI, and Valentinus Lublinus. Lublinus was one of several former students who drew attention to their teacher's method by publishing his lectures and notes after his death. The new field of clinical medicine then began to attract students from northern Europe.

In 1545, he helped establish the first botanical garden in Padua.

He died in Padua.

== Selected works ==
- De excrementis.
- De uterinis affectibus. 1556.
- In nonum librum Rhasis ad R[egem] Almansorem lectiones restitutae a Ioanne Cratone. Basel 1562.
- Medicina universa (Comprehensive Medicine), three volumes compiled from his lectures and notes. Frankfurt 1587.
