= Leonard Goffiné =

Leonard Goffiné (6 December 1648 – 11 August 1719) was a German Catholic priest who wrote devotional texts which remained influential in his country for two centuries afterwards.

== Biography ==
Born in Cologne, or according to some, Broich, at the age of nineteen he entered the Norbertine Abbey of Steinfeld, in the Eifel district of Germany, and commenced his two years novitiate in July 1667. Having made his solemn profession on 16 July 1667, he was sent for his course of philosophy and theology to the Norbertine college in Cologne. Ordained priest on Ember Saturday before Christmas, 1667, Goffine was sent to Dünwald to assist the priests who were charged with the direction of the parish and the convent of the Norbertine canonesses. In the same capacity he was afterwards sent to Ellen, where there was also a convent of Norbertine nuns. Goffine remained four years in each of these places, being recalled by the abbot, 26 February 1680, to fill the office of novice master in the abbey. He was next given charge of the parish of Clarholz, which was incorporated with the Norbertine abbey of the same name, in the diocese of Osnabrück, for owing to the dearth of priests due Lutheranism and the Thirty Year War, abbots and bishops were obliged to have recourse to other dioceses and religious orders to fill the vacancies.

Goffine remained at Clarholz five years (1680–85), and was sent thence to Niederehe, a priory which the Abbey of Steinfeld possessed in the Archdiocese of Trier. He remained in Niederehe but a very short time, being sent in 1885 to assist the clergy of St. Lambert's at Coesfield, in the Diocese of Munster. He left Coesfeld in 1691, when, at the urgent request of the Archbishop of Trier, he undertook the charge of the parishes, first of Wehr, then of Rheinböllen, and afterwards of Idar-Oberstein, from December, 1696, until his death in 1719. While parish priest of Oberstein (a mostly Protestant town) he had also to attend the Catholics living in Weiersbach, in the Diocese of Mainz. Goffine himself states that he had taken St. Norbert, the founder of his order, as his model, "because St. Norbert cared and worked so much for the salvation of souls."

== Works ==
While he was at Coesfeld he wrote his best-known work, Handpostille oder Christkatholische Unterrichtungen auf alle Sonn und Feyer-tagen des ganzen Jahrs (brief commentaries or Postils in the form of question and answer on the proper of the mass, principally on the epistle and gospel of the day). This book was ready in 1687, and in 1688 it received the imprimatur of the Vicar-General of Münster, and in 1690 the approbation of William Heimbach, Norbertine prior of Meer, and John Dirking, Rector of the Jesuit college of Hildesheim. The first edition, printed in Mainz in 1690, was soon exhausted, and a second edition was printed in Cologne in 1692. Translations have been made into Moravian, Bohemian, Hungarian, English, French, Italian, Swedish and Flemish.

=== Other books ===
- Auslegung der Regel des heiligen Augustinus (Cologne, 1692)
- Trostbuch in Trübsalen (Cologne)
- Cibus animæ matutinalis, etc. (Cologne, 1705)
- Sermons for the whole year, 2 vols. (Nuremberg, 1705)
- Erklarung des Katechismi Petri Canisii (Cologne, 1712)
- Die Lehre Christi (Cologne, 1715)
- Kleiner Kinder-katechismus (Cologne, 1717)
- Der Wachter des gottlichen Worts (Cologne, 1718)
- Praxes Sacræ seu modus explicandi cæremonias per annum (Frankfurt, 1719).
- Goffine, Leonard (1896). Goffine's Devout instructions on the Epistles and Gospels for the Sundays and holydays. Benzinger Brothers.
