= Böhlau Verlag =

Publishing company

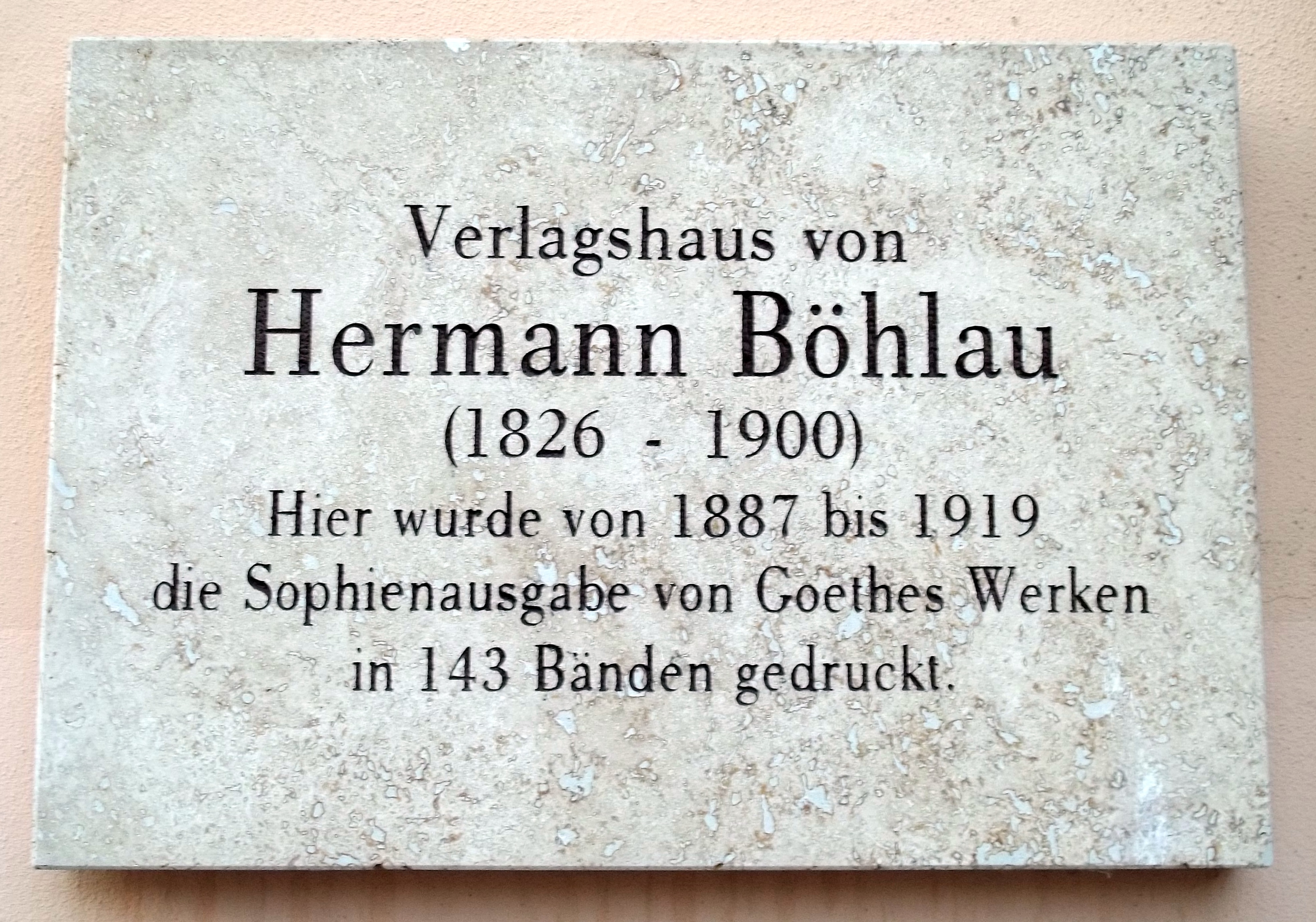
Commemorative plaque to Hermann Böhlau on the Weimar City Archive, his first publishing house (Kleine Teichgasse 6)

Böhlau Verlag is a book and magazine publisher predominantly of humanities and social science disciplines, based in Vienna (Böhlau Verlag GmbH & Co. KG) and Cologne (Böhlau Verlag GmbH & Cie.), with a branch in Weimar. They describe their focus as being "from the historically oriented humanities". The publishing house was an independent and privately owned media corporation until it was acquired by Vandenhoeck & Ruprecht in 2017.

== Company history ==
In 1853 the bookseller Hermann Böhlau (1826–1900) founded the publishing house, which would become known for its legal, linguistic and literary-historical works. Its output included Goethe's collected works in 143 volumes (1887–1919). This book series was officially known as Goethes Werke and commonly referred to as the Weimar Ausgabe (WA) of Goethe's works and as the "Sophien Edition", having been named after the patron Grand Duchess Sophie of Saxe-Weimar-Eisenach, the wife of Grand Duke Carl Alexander.

In 1883 the publishing firm launched an authoritative edition of the works of Martin Luther, officially known as D. Martin Luthers Werke: kritische Gesammtausgabe and commonly known as the Weimarer Ausgabe (WA) (Weimar Edition of Luther's works).

The firm also published the Zeitschrift für geschichtliche Rechtswissenschaft (Journal for Historical Jurisprudence) which had been founded in 1815 by the jurist Friedrich Carl von Savigny and others, and which still appears today under the title Zeitschrift der Savigny-Stiftung für Rechtsgeschichte (Journal of the Savigny Foundation for Legal History).

Soon after Böhlau's death in 1900, the publishing house was renamed Hermann Böhlaus Nachfolger (Hermann Böhlau's Successors).

In 1924, during the global economic crisis of the 1920s, one of the publisher's authors, the legal scholar Professor Karl Rauch (1880–1953), first took over the firm's Zeitschrift für Rechtsgeschichte (Journal for Legal History) and then the entire publishing house. After the end of the Second World War, Rauch founded a new publishing house in Marburg in 1947, which he named Böhlau Verlag in 1951. In 1957 the company was relocated to Cologne. Another publishing house of the same name was founded in Graz and later moved to Vienna.

Despite the division of Germany and the founding of the German Democratic Republic, the parent company in Weimar, located in the Soviet occupation zone of Germany, remained as a privately run publishing house. The manager and limited partner Leiva Petersen (1912–1992) received a personal operating license in 1946 and became personally liable partner of the Weimar publishing house in 1947 with the consent of Karl Rauch. Despite adverse conditions, Petersen managed to maintain the high scientific level for decades. The publishing output included large multivolume editions such as the Schiller-Nationalausgabe (Schiller National Edition), the Goethe series, Luther-Gesamtausgabe (Luther complete edition), and the firm's renowned yearbooks, such as the Shakespeare-Jahrbuch and the Hanse-Jahrbuch. In addition, the firm's publishing programme expanded to include historical, art and cultural history literature. Within the framework of what was politically feasible, business contacts continued to exist between the firm in East Germany and the West German Böhlau Verlag.

However, as a private company in the socialist country was becoming increasingly difficult to maintain over time, Leiva Petersen decided in 1978 to sell the publishing house Hermann Böhlaus Nachfolger in Weimar to the Akademie der Wissenschaften der DDR (Academy of Sciences of the GDR). The Rauch family agreed to the takeover in 1979. Petersen managed the publishing house until 1983.

Following the end of the German Democratic Republic in 1989, the Böhlau Verlag in Cologne and Vienna tried unsuccessfully to reverse this sale. In 1998 Hermann Böhlaus Nachfolger was taken over by the publisher J. B. Metzler, who belonged to the Georg von Holtzbrinck publishing group. On June 30, 2002, the publishing house in Weimar was closed. Since then, the publisher has only existed as an imprint at J. B. Metzler, which in turn was acquired by Springer Nature in 2015.

Böhlau Verlag in Cologne and Vienna opened their own branch in Weimar in 1990 and after 1998 took over a number of book series from Verlag Hermann Böhlaus Nachfolger.

== Publishing program ==
The current program of the Böhlau Verlag includes publications from the field of history (including cultural, art and legal history) as well as literature and linguistics. Examples of serial works are the Werte der deutschen Heimat (Values of the German Homeland), Rheinisches Archiv (Rhenish Archive), Forum Ibero-Americanum, Beiträge zur historischen Bildungsforschung (Contributions to Historical Educational Research), Osteuropa-Handbücher (Eastern Europe Handbooks), Anglistische Studien (English Studies) and several series of dissertations.

There are also journals such as the Archiv für Diplomatik ("archive for diplomacy"), the Archiv für Kulturgeschichte ("archive for cultural history"), the Internationale Zeitschrift für Kommunikationsforschung ("international journal for communication research") and the Deutsches Dante-Jahrbuch ("German Dante yearbook").

Since 2001, Böhlau has been one of the partner publishers of the academic and scientific publishing body, Uni-Taschenbücher-Verlag ("university paperback publisher") (UTB).

== Attribution ==
- Some of the text in this article is translated from the Böhlau Verlag page on German Wikipedia.
