= Leiva Petersen =

German classical philologist and publisher

Leiva Petersen (28 November 1912 – 17 April 1992) was a German classical philologist and publisher.

== Life ==
Leiva Konstanze Petersen was born in Berlin. Her father, Carl Petersen (1885–1942) was originally from Hviding in Northwest Schleswig. Carl Petersen was a history professor at Kiel University until 1939 when he switched to the University of Greifswald. Leiva Petersen's mother, born Ida Minna Räuber, was a teacher. A cousin was Günther Ramin, the organist and director of music at St. Thomas Church, Leipzig.

She attended school at Marburg and Kiel, and then studied Classical Philology, History and Archeology successively at the University of Frankfurt am Main, the Ludwig-Maximilians-Universität München, Kiel University, and the University of Würzburg. It was at the Ludwig-Maximilians-Universität München where she first met Uvo Hölscher (1914-1996), a fellow student of philology who became a lifelong friend. In 1937, she received her doctorate, supervised by Karl Reinhardt from Frankfurt for a piece of work on the "... history of personification (προσωποποιία) in Greek poetry and visual art" ("Zur Geschichte der Personifikation in griechischer Dichtung und bildender Kunst"). After this she undertook an extended study trip to Italy, also taking time to work for a time as a home tutor in Denmark. Back in Germany, in 1939 she passed the exams necessary to take up a teaching career in higher education.

Now, however, she embarked on a book trade apprenticeship with Hermann Böhlaus Nachfolger, a venerable publishing institution that could trace its convoluted and at times illustrious history back to the "Weimarer Hofbuchdruckerei" ("Weimar Court printers") founded in 1624. Just three years later, in 1942, she found herself in charge of the business, known as its "Kommanditistin". She retained the responsibilities which the appointment involved until her career ended in 1983. War, which had broken out in 1939, ended in May 1945, with a large part of what had been central Germany - including Weimar - administered as the Soviet occupation zone. In 1946 Petersen obtained one of the first private company licences from the Soviet military administrators, in 1947 becoming personally responsible (and liable) for the business. Under her leadership the business produced academic editions of German classics and Reformation literature, including the works of Goethe, Schiller and Luther, along with the humanities more generally.

From 1951/52 she also embarked on a parallel part-time career as a freelance co-author. Meanwhile, the Böhlau company continued for several decades to be one of the last independent publishing businesses inside what had become, in October 1949, the Soviet sponsored German Democratic Republic (East Germany). In 1978, the business was sold to the (East) German Academy of Sciences and Humanities: Petersen continued to run it, now as a department of the academy, till 1983.

Alongside her responsibilities in publishing, between 1961 and 1972 Petersen held a part-time appointment as a Classical Philosopher and Senior Assistant at the Academy of Sciences and Humanities. Successful projects included producing an updated and enlarged edition of the Prosopographia Imperii Romani, a lexicon of Roman Empire state officials. As she grew in eminence, she also sat as a member of various important committees. She was a member of the Administration Committee for the Schiller National Exhibition and the committee of the German Schiller Society. She was on the board of the (German) Shakespeare Society and a member of the Publishers' Committee with the German Book Exchange ("Börsenverein des Deutschen Buchhandels").

Having retired from regular employment in 1983, Leiva Petersen died in Weimar, where she still lived, on 17 April 1992.

== Awards and honours ==
- 1976 Friedrich Schiller Medal from the University of Jena
- 1977 Friedrich Schiller Medal from the University of Jena
- 1980 Leibniz Medal from the Academy of Sciences and Humanities (Berlin)
- 1982 Golden Medal from the Goethe Society (Weimar)
- 1986 Reuchlin Prize from the city of Pforzheim
