= Ludwig Camerarius =

German politician (1573–1651)

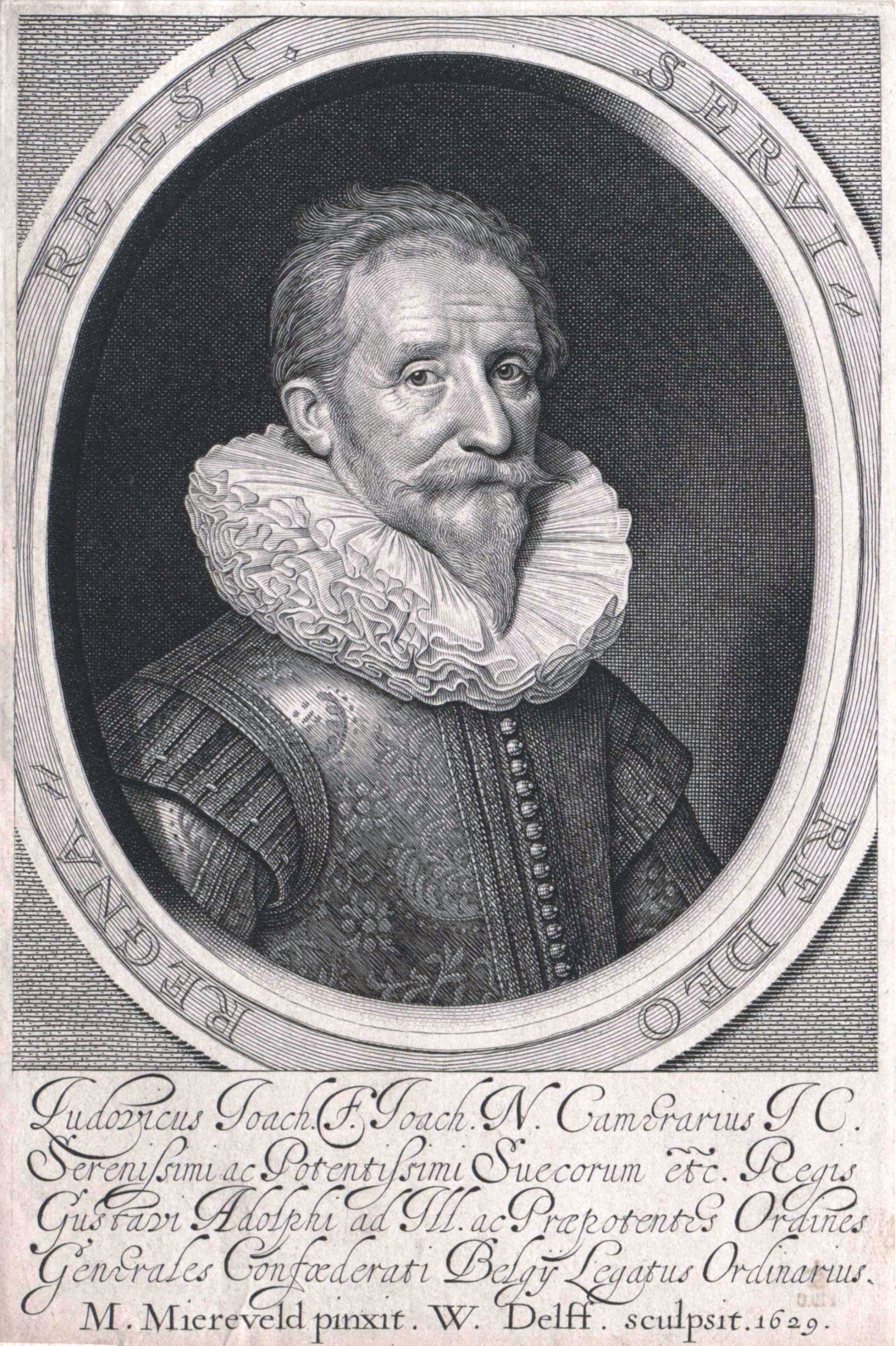
Ludwig Camerarius

Ludwig Camerarius (22 January 1573, in Nuremberg – 4 October 1651, probably in Heidelberg) was a German statesman, lawyer, minister and head of Frederick V's government-in-exile in The Hague. He also served Swedish interests later in his life. He was the son of the scholar Joachim Camerarius the Younger and grandson of Joachim Camerarius the Elder.

The Collectio Camerariana collection of letters (now held in the Staatsbibliothek München) includes his correspondence from 1621 as well as several letters from Philipp Melanchthon, Martin Luther, Ulrich Zwingli, Jakob Micyllus, Desiderius Erasmus and the poet Georg Fabricius, mostly written to his grandfather Joachim—these form an important source for the Protestant Reformation and the Counter-Reformation.

== Life ==
From 1588 he studied at Altdorf bei Nürnberg, then from 2 February 1592 in Helmstedt, from summer 1592 in Leipzig and then from 1597 in Basel. In Basel he graduated as a Doctor of Law. On 17 April 1599 he married Anna Maria Modesta Pastoir (15 July 1580 in Heidelberg - c 1642), with whom he had seven children. After his graduation he practised from 1597 onwards at the Reichskammergericht in Speyer.

In 1598 he entered Frederick V's service and was made a Councillor (Hofrat) in 1610 and a Privy Councillor (Geheimer Rat) in 1611. Under the overall direction of Christian I, governor of the Upper Palatine and chancellor of Palatine Electorate, Camerarius became de facto head of the Palatine's foreign policy and—anxious for promotion—aimed to gain Frederick the throne of Bohemia. He is thought to be the originator of the plan to put up Maximilian I, Duke of Bavaria as an opponent to Ferdinand II at the 1619 imperial election.

After Frederick was elected king of Bohemia, Camerarius followed him to Prague and in 1620 was made Privy Councillor and vice-chancellor of Silesia. After Frederick's fall in November 1620, Camerarius followed him into exile in the Netherlands and wrote pamphlets and books attempting to refute the Palatinate's causing the Thirty Years' War. Especially after his appointment as head of Frederick's government-in-exile, Camerarius was convinced that Protestantism's main priority was to lead a Europe-wide war against the Habsburgs and the Catholic League.

In 1627 Camerarius was succeeded as head of the government-in-exile by Johann Joachim Rusdorf. As early as 1626 he had gone over to serving Sweden in the Netherlands, though he remained committed to the Palatinate's cause, and worked for the Swedes until 1640. Until 1651 he was based in Groningen and returned to Heidelberg shortly before his death in 1651.

== Works ==
- Friderici dei gratia Bohemiae regis, comitis palatini rheni, electoris &c. declaratio publica, Cur Regni Bohemiae annexarumque Provinciarum Regimen in se susceperit, 1619, Digital site of the University of Augsburg
- Prodromus, Oder Vortrab, Nothwendiger Rettung vornehmer Evangelischer Hohen und niedern Standts, betrangten und verleumbden Personen unschuldt, durch gründliche entdeckung der Papistischen schädlichen Intention unnd Vorhabens : Das ist: Warhaffter unnd glaubwirdiger Abdruck etzlicher intercipirten sehr weit außsehenden gefährlichen Schreiben und Schrifften, welche auß den Originalien, mit fleiß abcopirt, und theils auß denen Sprachen, darinnen sie geschrieben, trewlich verteutschet sein, mit angehengter kurtzer Information unnd Anleitung, 1622
- Cancellaria hispanica : Adjecta sunt Acta publica, Hoc est: Scripta et Epistolae authenticae, `e quibus partim infelicis belli in Germania partim Proscriptionis in Electorem Palatinum scopus praecipuus apparet ..., 1622
- Bericht und Antwort uff die vornembste Capita, Päß und Puncten der bayer-anhaltischen geheimen Cantzley : sampt etlichen Beylagen, 1623
- Mysterium iniquitatis, sive secreta secretorum turco-papistica secreta : Contra Libellum famosum, sub titulo Secreta calvino-turcica, auctore quodam personato Theonesto Cogmandolo Politiae Christianae professore, aliquoties editum. XCV considerationibus revelata, et totidem eius malitiosis et ex mera calumnia conflatis considerationibus ex parallelo opposita ... Justinopoli, 1625
