= Veit Dietrich =

German theologian and reformer (1506–1549)

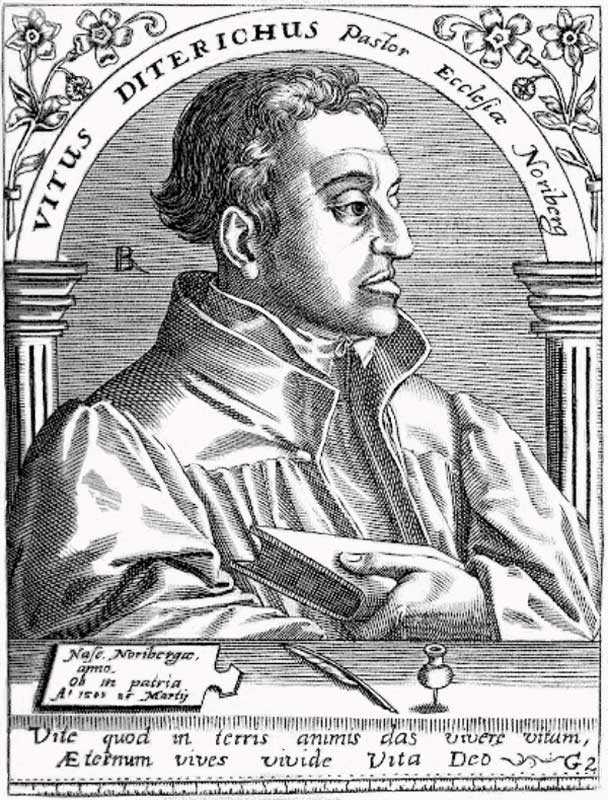
- Veit Dietrich (copper engraving, 16th century)
- Born: 8 December 1506; Nuremberg
- Died: 25 March 1549 (aged 42); Nuremberg

Veit Dietrich, also Vitus Theodorus or Vitus Diterichus, (8 December 1506 – 25 March 1549) was a German Lutheran theologian, writer and reformer.

== Life and work ==
Veit Dietrich was born on 8 December 1506 in Nuremberg; his father was a shoemaker. The talent of the boy was soon recognized and patronage of a wealthy benefactor enabled him to attend higher education at the University of Wittenberg. He enrolled in March 1522. At the university, Philipp Melanchthon recognized his talent and encouraged him.

Later, he was Martin Luther's housemate and a close confidant. As a result, he accompanied Luther to the Marburg Colloquy and stayed with him during the Diet of Augsburg in 1530 at the Fortress of Coburg. He earned a Master's degree in 1529 and taught in the art department. Later, he was offered a professorship in Wittenberg but he rejected it.

== Works ==
- Luther's Piety
- "Summaria", on the Old Testament
- "Summaria", on the New Testament
- He was also one of the editors of Luther's "Lectures on Genesis" and recorded parts of Luther's Table Talk

== Literature ==
- P. Meinhold: Die Genesis – Vorlesung Luthers und ihre Herausgeber. In: Forschungen zur Kirchen- u. Geistesgeschichte. Jahrgang 8, Stuttgart 1936.
- Bernhard Klaus: Veit Dietrich Leben und Werk. Nürnberg 1958
- Bernhard Klaus: Veit Dietrich. In: Fränkische Lebensbilder. Jahrgang 3, 1969, S. 141
- Marinus A. van den Broek: Sprichwort und Redensart in Veit Dietrichs 'Etliche Schriften für den gemeinen man'. Leuvense Bijdragen 75, 1986
- Hans Reuther (1957). "Dietrich, Veit". Neue Deutsche Biographie (in German). Vol. 3. Berlin: Duncker & Humblot. pp. 699–699.
- Friedrich Wilhelm Bautz (1975). "Dietrich, Veit". In Bautz, Friedrich Wilhelm (ed.). Biographisch-Bibliographisches Kirchenlexikon (BBKL) (in German). Vol. 1. Hamm: Bautz. col. 1302–1303. ISBN 3-88309-013-1.
