= Peter Monau =

German physician

Peter Monau (Latin: Petrus Monavius; 9 April 1551 – 12 May 1588) was a court physician of Emperor Rudolf II.

== Biography ==
He was the son of Stenzel Monau and younger brother of Jakob Monau. After several years of humanistic studies in Wittenberg and Heidelberg, he devoted himself from 1575 to 1578 to medical studies in Padua. Having earned his doctorate in Basel with Felix Platter with the work De dentium affectibus (the first doctoral theses in stomatology), he settled in Breslau as physician. In 1580, he was named imperial physician (Archiater Caesareus) by Rudolf II on the recommendation of Johannes Crato von Krafftheim.

He carried out a correspondence with the Heidelberg Orientalist Jakob Christmann and Augsburg Rector David Hoeschel to 1584. He also corresponded with the Heidelberg and Basel medical professor Thomas Erastus. He died in Prague.

== Publications ==
- Consiliorum et epistolarum medicinalium liber; Frankfurt, 1591, with Johannes Crato von Krafftheim
- De dentium affectibus theses inaugurales. Basel, 1578 (VD 16 M 6140).
