= Postil =

Cycle of Christian homilies

A postil or postill (Latin: postilla; German: Postille) was originally a term for Bible commentaries. It is derived from the Latin post illa verba textus ("after these words from Scripture"), referring to biblical readings. The word first occurs in the chronicle (with reference to examples of 1228 and 1238) of Nicolas Trivetus, but later it came to mean only homiletic exposition, and thus became synonymous with the homily in distinction from the thematic sermon. Finally, after the middle of the fourteenth century, it was applied to an annual cycle of homilies.

== Early Lutheran postils ==
From the time of Martin Luther, who published the first part of his postil under the title Enarrationes epistolarum et evangeliorum quas postillas vocant (Wittenberg, 1521), every annual cycle of sermons on the lessons, whether consisting of homilies or formal sermons, is termed a postil. A few of the most famous Lutheran postils are those of M. Luther (Kirchenpostille, Wittenberg, 1527; Hauspostille, 1542, 1549), P. Melanchthon (Evangelien-Postille, Germ., Nuremberg, 1549; Lat., Hanover, 1594), M. Chemnitz (Evangelien-Postille, Magdeburg, 1594), L. Osiander (Bauern-Postille, Tübingen, 1597), and J. Arndt (Evangelien-Postille, Leipzig, 1616).

== Catholic postils ==
By 1530 postils were commonly used in Catholic preaching, at least in Germany. The two (in Latin) by Thomas Stapleton proved popular. Frymire has tabulated the development from 1520 (Catholic and Lutheran).

== Later postils ==
The term postil fell into disuse during the period of Pietism and the Enlightenment, but was revived by Claus Harms (Winter-Postille, Kiel, 1812; Sommer-Postille, 1815). It has again become common through W. Löhe (Evangelien-Postille, Frommel 1848; Epistel-Postille, 1858), and M. Stuttgart (Herzpostille, Bremen, 1882, 1890; Hauspostille, 1887–88; Pilgerpostille, 1890).

Reformed Churches, which disregard a regular series of lessons, have no postils; in the Roman Catholic Church the term has been kept, especially through Leonard Goffiné (Hand-Postill oder christ-catholische Unterrichtungen von allen Sonn- and Feyr-Tagen des gantzen Jahrs (Mainz, 1690; popular, illustrated ed., reissued twenty-one times by H. Herder, Freiburg-im-Breisgau, 1875–1908; Eng. transl., T. Noethen, New York, n.d.).

== See also ==
- Homiliarium
- Marginalia
