= Rorer, West Virginia =

- Unincorporated community
- Location within West Virginia Location within the United States
- Coordinates: 38°01′30″N 80°16′37″W
- Country: United States
- State: West Virginia
- County: Greenbrier
- Elevation: 1,939 ft (591 m)
- Time zone: UTC-5 (Eastern (EST))
  - Summer (DST): UTC-4 (EDT)
- Area codes: 304 & 681
- GNIS feature ID: 1552729

Rorer is an unincorporated community in Greenbrier County, West Virginia, United States. Rorer is located on the Greenbrier River, 5 miles (8.0 km) northeast of Falling Spring.

Droop Mountain is immediately to the East on the Greenbrier River.
