= Konrad Cordatus =

Preacher and Protestant reformer (1480–1546)

Konrad Cordatus or Conrad Cordatus (c. 1480 – 6 April 1546) was a preacher and Protestant reformer in Niemegk who severely attacked Philipp Melanchthon, German reformer and collaborator with Martin Luther, during his sojourn in Tübingen in 1536.

Cordatus was born between 1480 and 1483 near the Austrial city of Wels to a peasant family sympathetic to the Hussites. He travelled to Vienna to study under Conrad Celtes, a humanist scholar, and he entered priesthood in 1505. He then completed his doctorate in theology in Ferrara, Italy, before returning to Ofen, Austria, in 1510. As the Reformation swept through Europe, he was jailed for supporting the movement and fled in 1524 to Wittenberg as a refugee. In July 1526, Philip Melanchthon urged Cordatus to help a new gymnasium in Nuremberg; Cordatus instead travelled to Silesia that fall where Frederick II of Legnica ventured to establish a new university. Frederick's efforts failed, and Cordatus returned to Hungary in 1527. Martin Luther found him a position in Saint Mary's parish in Zwickau in spring 1529, but conflict with Zwickau's city council led to his return to Wittenberg by 1531. Cordatus was given a pastorate in nearby Niemegk. During his 1532–33 stay at Wittenberg, he recorded several of Luther's Table Talks (Tischreden). By 1540, Cordatus moved to the Margraviate of Brandenburg, promoting the Reformation as a superintendent in Stendal. He died on 6 April 1546.

== See also ==
- List of Protestant Reformers
