= Table Talk (Luther) =

1566 collection of Martin Luther's sayings

Table Talk (German: Tischreden) is a collection of Martin Luther's sayings around the dinner table at Lutherhaus, Luther's home, but also at other times and locations, such as walks in the garden or notes taken while on journeys. It is based on notes taken by various students of Luther between 1531 and 1546. It was compiled by Johannes Mathesius, J. Aurifaber, V. Dietrich, Ernst Kroker, and several others, and published at Eisleben in 1566.

Mathesius spoke enthusiastically of the privilege of eating with Luther and hearing him converse. Earlier notetakers had written down only the serious remarks of Luther, but Mathesius also wrote down the facetious or even damaging remarks, a sign of the increasing reverence in which Luther was held.

== Contents in the Weimarer Ausgabe ==
- WA TR 1. Tischreden aus der ersten Hälfte der dreißiger Jahre (i.e. from the first half of the 1530s)

Nr. 1–656: Veit Dietrichs Nachschriften
Nr. 657–684: Nachschriften Nikolaus Medlers
Nr. 685–1231: Veit Dietrichs und Nikolaus Meddlers Sammlung

- WA TR 2. Tischreden aus den dreißiger Jahren (i.e. from the 1530s, continued)

Nr. 1232–1889: Johannes Schlaginhaufens Nachschriften
Nr. 1890–1949: Ludwig Rabes Sammlung
Nr. 1950–2802b: Die Sammlung von Konrad Cordatus (Erste Hälfte)

- WA TR 3. Tischreden aus den dreißiger Jahren (i.e. from the 1530s, continued)

Nr. 2803a–3416: Die Sammlung von Konrad Cordatus (Schluß)
Nr. 3417–3462: Tischreden aus der Handschrift "Cord. B."
Nr. 3463a–3463h: Tischreden aus der Handschrift Zwick.
Nr. 3464a–3464p: Tischreden aus der Handschrift "Wolf. 3231."
Nr. 3465–3659: Anton Lauterbachs und Hieronymus Wellers Nachschriften aus den Jahren 1536 und 1537
Nr. 3660–3682: Tischreden aus dem 1. Abschnitt der Handschrift "Math. L."
Nr. 3683–4201: Anton Lauterbachs Tagebuch auf Jahr 1538

- WA TR 4. Tischreden aus den Jahren 1538–1540

Nr. 4202–4318: Tischreden, die in der Sammlung B. und in der Handschrift Khum. ins Jahr 1538 dadiert werden.
Nr. 4319–4719: Anton Lauterbachs Tagebuch aufs Jahr 1539.
Nr. 4720–4756: Tischreden, die in der Sammlung B. ins Jahr 1539 dadiert werden.
Nr. 4757–4857: Die Sammlung Khummer.
Nr. 4857a–4857p: Tischreden aus der Handschrift "Dresd. 1. 423" und aus dem 7. Abschnitt der Handschrift Math. L.
Nr. 4858–5341: Nachschriften von Johannes Mathesius 1540.

- WA TR 5. Tischreden aus den Jahren 1540–1544

Nr. 5342–5378: Tischreden aus dem Jahre 1540, die wahrscheinlich nicht von Johannes Mathesius nachgeschrieben sind.
Nr. 5379–5603: Kaspar Heydenreichs Nachschriften aus den Jahren 1542 und 1543
Nr. 5604–5658: Tischreden aus der Handschrift "Clm. 937".
Nr. 5659–5675: Hieronymus Besolds Nachschriften 1544
Nr. 5676–5749: Tischreden aus der Handschrift "Clm. 943".
Nr. 5750–5790: Tischreden aus der Handschrift "Clm. 939".
Nr. 5791–5824: Tischreden der Handschrift "Bav." und "Oben."
Nr. 5825–5889: Tischreden aus der Handschrift "Luth.-Mel."
Nr. 5890–5941: Tischreden aus der Handschrift "Wolf. 3232"
Nr. 5942–5989: Tischreden aus Georg Rörers Handschriftenbänden.
Nr. 5990–6507: Tischreden aus Anton Lauterbachs Sammlung "B."

- WA TR 6. Tischreden aus verschiedenen Jahren, aus Johannes Aurifabers Sammlung (i.e. from various years from the collection made by Johannes Aurifaber)

Nr. 6508–7075: Tischreden aus Johannes Aurifabers Sammlung (Abkürzung: FB) (i.e. Table talks from the collection made by Johannes Aurifaber (abbreviation: FB))
