= Joachim Camerarius =

German classical scholar (1500–1574)

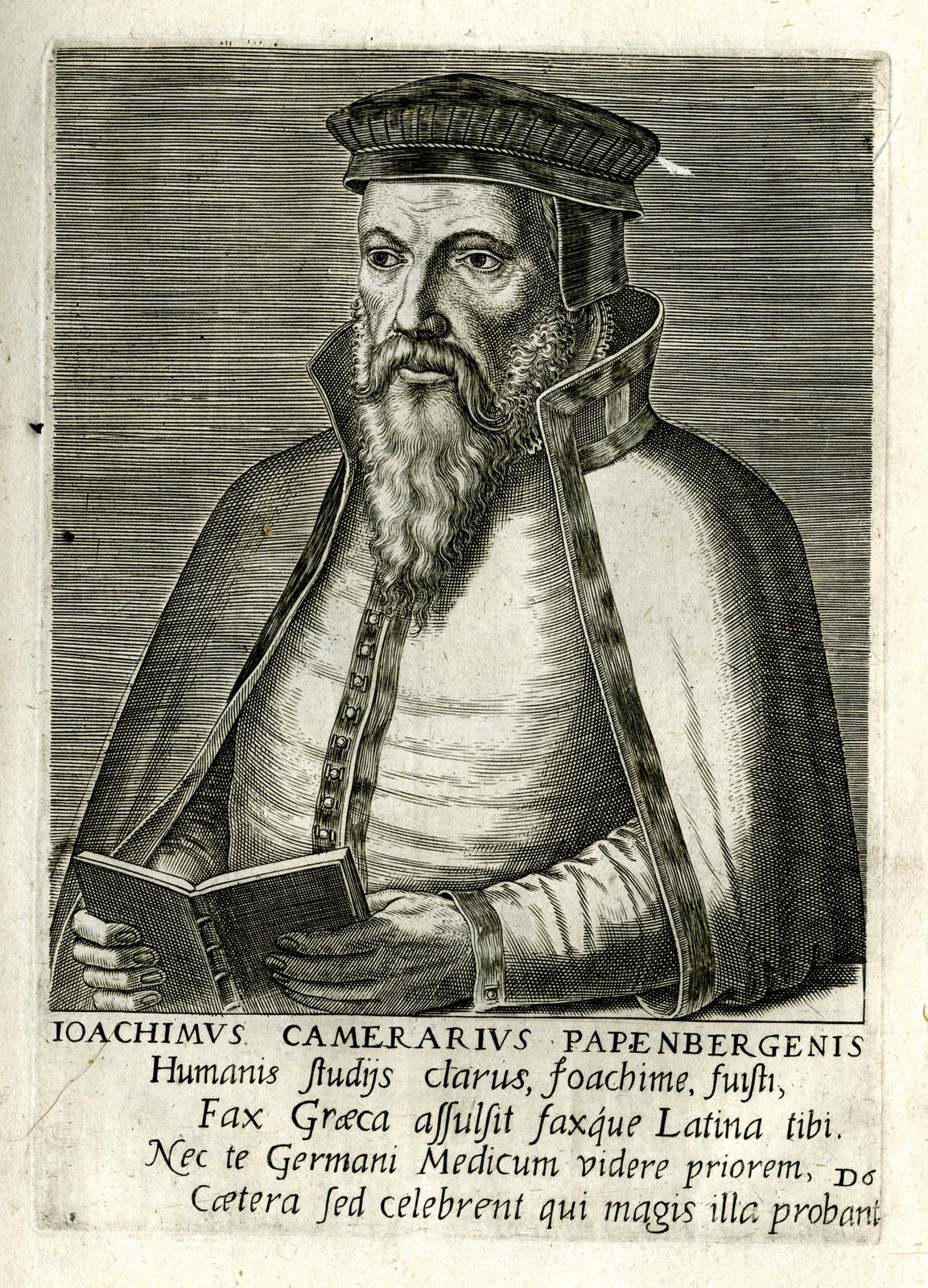
Portrait by Philip Galle, 1567

Joachim Camerarius (12 April 1500 – 17 April 1574), the Elder, was a German classical scholar. His critical abilities, his deep understanding of Greek and Latin, and his wide-ranging knowledge of the ancient world made him one of the foremost German scholars of his time.

== Life ==
Camerarius was born in Bamberg, in the Prince-Bishopric of Bamberg. His family name was Liebhard, but he was generally called Kammermeister, previous members of his family having held the office of chamberlain (camerarius) to the bishops of Bamberg.

He studied at Leipzig, Erfurt and Wittenberg, where he became a student and friend of Philipp Melanchthon. For some years he was teacher of history and Greek at the gymnasium in Nuremberg (Ägidiengymnasium). In 1530 he was sent as deputy for Nuremberg to the diet of Augsburg, where he helped Melanchthon in drawing up the Augsburg Confession.

Five years later he was commissioned by Duke Ulrich of Württemberg to reorganize the University of Tübingen; and in 1541 he rendered a similar service at Leipzig, where the remainder of his life was chiefly spent. He played an important part in the Reformation movement, and his advice was frequently sought by leading men.

In 1535 he entered into a correspondence with Francis I as to the possibility of a reconciliation between the Catholic and Protestant creeds; and in 1568 Maximilian II sent for him to Vienna to consult him on the same subject. He died in Leipzig on 17 April 1574.

He was the father of the physician Joachim Camerarius the Younger, and his grandson Ludwig Camerarius was a leading figure of the Thirty Years' War, as head of the Palatinate government in exile.

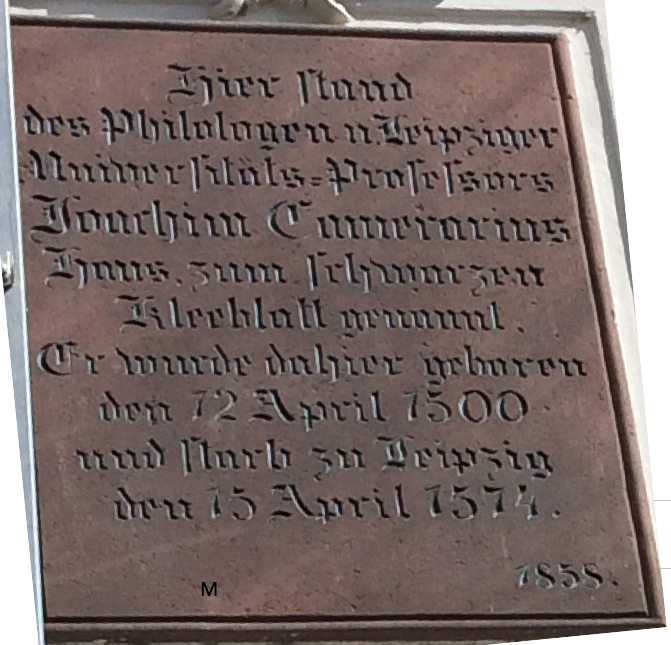
Commemorative plate in Bamberg marking the birthplace of Camerarius

== Works ==
He translated into Latin Herodotus, Demosthenes, Xenophon, Homer, Theocritus, Sophocles, Lucian, Theodoretus, Nicephorus, Ptolemy, Euclid, and other Greek writers. He published upwards of 150 works, including a Catalogue of the Bishops of the Principal Sees; Greek Epistles; a treatise on numismatics; the Hippocomicus, a book of horsemanship; accounts of his journeys in Latin verse; and biographies of such contemporaries as Eobanus Hessus, George of Anhalt, Melanchthon, and Albrecht Dürer. His Epistolae Familiares, published after his death, are a valuable contribution to the history of his time.

He produced the first printed Greek edition of Ptolemy's astrology text, the Tetrabiblos, in 1535. It was printed in a quarto format by the publisher Johannes Petreius at Nuremberg along with Camerarius's translation to Latin of Books I, II and portions of Books III and IV, accompanied with his notes on the first two books, the Greek text of the Centiloquium (Καρπός) and a Latin translation from Iovianus Pontanus. A second edition, with a Latin translation by Melanchthon, appeared in 1553, printed in Basel, Switzerland in octavo format by Johannes Oporinus. In 1976 Rudolf Pfeiffer judged that this edition had still not been completely superseded. Camerarius was also responsible for the first edition of Ptolemy's Almagest, published in Basel in 1538.

His edition of the comic playwright Plautus, published in Basel in 1552, was the first to draw on the oldest extant manuscripts, one of which is still known today as the codex vetus Camerarii ("Camerarius's ancient codex"). His text of the plays was not substantially improved until the work of Friedrich Ritschl in the 19th century.

== Bibliography ==
- Baron, Frank. (1978). Joachim Camerarius (1500–1574): Essays on the History of Humanism during the Reformation . Munich: W. Fink. ISBN 9783770513802
- Brosseder, Claudia. (2005). "The Writing in the Wittenberg Sky: Astrology in Sixteenth-Century Germany". Journal of the History of Ideas. Vol. 66, No. 4 (Oct.), pp. 557–576.
- Bursian, Conrad. (1883). Geschichte der classischen philologie in Deutschland von den anfängen bis zur gegenwart. Munich: R. Oldenbourg. HathiTrust
- Deufert, Marcus. (2012). "Camerarius, Ioachimus", in Brill's New Pauly, Supplement I, Volume 6: History of classical Scholarship (English edition by C. M. Schroeder, 2014) doi:10.1163/2214-8647_bnps6_COM_00112
- Pfeiffer, Rudolf (1976). History of Classical Scholarship from 1300 to 1850. Oxford: Clarendon Press.
- Robbins, F. E., ed. and trans. (1971). Ptolemy, Tetrabiblos (Loeb edition). Cambridge, Mass.: Harvard University Press.
- Sandys, John Edwin. (1908). History of Classical Scholarship. Vol. II. Cambridge: Cambridge University Press. HathiTrust
