= Colmar Grünhagen =

German archivist and historian (1828–1911)

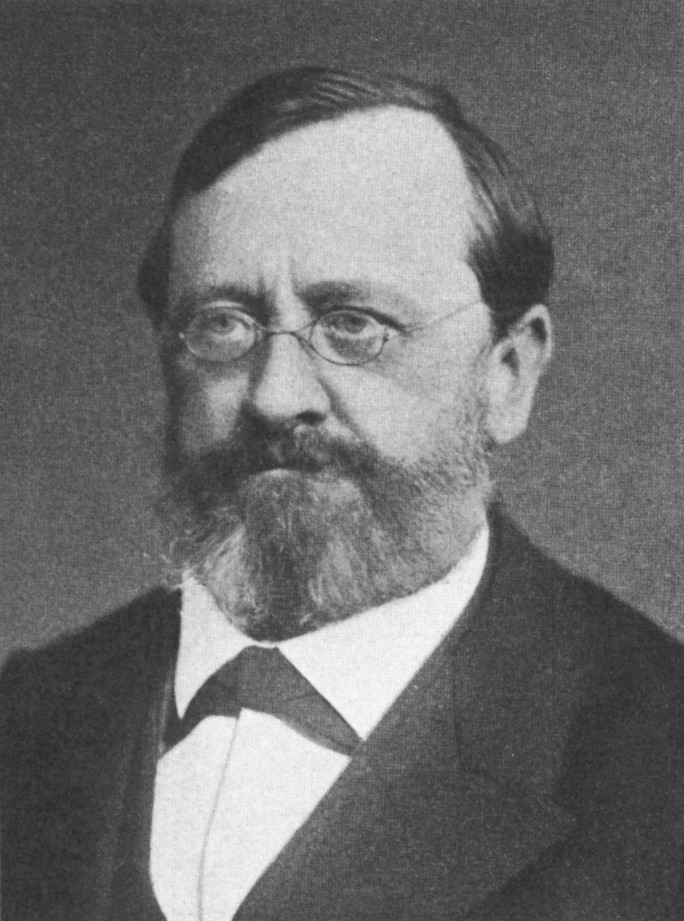

Colmar Grünhagen (2 April 1828 - 27 July 1911) was a German archivist and historian. Almost all of his considerable published output concerns the History of Silesia.

== Life and works ==
Colmar Grünhagen was born in Trebnitz and grew up in Breslau. His father was an apothecary. Between 1841 and 1847 he was a pupil initially at Breslau's St. Maria Magdalena Gymnasium (secondary school) and then at the Elizabeth Gymnasium (secondary school). On completing his schooling he moved on to study Classical Philology and History at the University of Jena. He moved again to pursue his studies at Berlin where he was influenced by Leopold von Ranke. During 1850 he studied briefly at the University of Breslau before moving on again, this time to the University of Halle. Between 1851 and 1853 he was able to combine his university studies with teaching work at secondary schools in Breslau. Meanwhile, it was from the University of Halle that on 21 December 1850 Grünhagen received his doctorate for a piece of work on the pontiff who famously (for historians) launched the First Crusade with a powerful sermon preached on a hillside just outside Clermont on 27 November 1095, Pope Urban II.

In March 1851 Grünhagen passed his secondary school teaching exams ("Oberlehrerexamen") in Breslau. At Easter 1853 he began work as a teaching assistant at the Friedrichs-Gymnasium (secondary school) in the city, becoming a full teacher there a few months later. Following his Habilitation from the University of Breslau in 1855, he took a university position as a History teacher ("...als Privatdozent"). In 1860 he published "Henrucus Pauper", described as a book of accounts for the city of Breslau between 1299 and 1358, using city records and other historical sources: the work comprised the third volume in the "Codex diplomaticus Silesiae" series. It was not until after he had resigned from the city's schools service, however, that on 11 March 1862 he succeeded Wilhelm Wattenbach as head of the Silesian Regional Archive (renamed "Silesian state/national archive" in 1867). For nearly forty years, until 1 April 1901, he remained in the post. During this period he received the titles of "Archivrat" in 1873 and "Geheim Archivrat" (very loosely, "Privy Archives Secretary") in 1885. The prestigious titles dated back to the late medieval period, but the core responsibilities of the head of the archives department appear to have remained broadly constant. He combined this and other positions with the editorship of the journal of the Silesian Historical Association ("Verein für Geschichte und Alterthum Schlesiens") between 1863 and 1905. Through his long tenure in these positions and as a result of the impressive quantity and detail of his output on Silesian history, Grünhagen became highly influential in his chosen specialist field, as well as with the Historical Association and the historian community more broadly. On 18 December 1866 he accepted an extraordinary professorship in History from the University of Breslau, where he continued to teach until 1911.

In 1871 Colmar Grünhagen was elected to the presidency of the Silesian Historical Association, retaining this position until 1905, following which he retained the title of honorary president. He also became an honorary member of the Silesian Society for Homeland Culture and, in 1868, a board member with the Silesian Museum for Arts and Antiquities, which he later chaired.

== Works ==
As editor, Grünhagen contributed extensively to the journal of the Silesian Historical Association. He was also a regular contributor to the Feuilleton (arts and literature) section of the Breslaauer Zeitung, the Preußische Jahrbücher, the Zeitschrift für Preußische Geschichte und Landeskunde and other historical periodicals.

=== Published output (selection) ===
- Vitae Urbani Secundi particula prima. Dissertation, Universität Halle-Wittenberg, 1848 [extended version 1850]
- Adalbert Erzbischof von Hamburg und die Idee eines nordischen Patriarchats. Brockhaus, Leipzig 1854
- Otfrid und Heliand. Historische Abhandlung. Habilitation dissertation, Universität Breslau, 1855
- Henricus pauper. Rechnungen der Stadt Breslau von 1299–1358. Max, Breslau 1860
- Breslau unter den Piasten als Deutsches Gemeinwesen. Max, Breslau 1861
- Friedrich der Große und die Breslauer in den Jahren 1740 und 1741. Korn, Breslau 1864
- König Johann von Böhmen und Bischof Nanker von Breslau. Gerold, Wien 1864 (from Akademie der Wissenschaften in Wien, Philosophisch-Historische Klasse: Sitzungsberichte, Volume 47, pp. 4–102)
- Aus dem Sagenkreise Friedrich des Großen. Breslau 1864
- with Georg Korn: Regesta episcopatus Vratislaviensis. Volume 1: Bis zum Jahre 1302. Hirt, Breslau 1864 (no subsequent volumes ever appeared)
- with Wilhelm Wattenbach: Registrum St. Wenceslai. Max, Breslau 1865
- Ueber Städtechroniken und deren zweckmäßige Förderung durch die Communalbehörden mit besonderer Rücksicht auf Schlesien. Maruschke & Berendt, Breslau 1865
- Breslau nach der preußischen Besitzergreifung. Mittler, Berlin 1867
- Regesten zur schlesischen Geschichte. Max, Breslau 1868–1923; Volume 1: Bis zum Jahre 1250. 1868; Volume 2: Bis zum Jahre 1280. 1875; Volume 3: Bis zum Jahre 1300. 1886; Volume 4: 1301/15. 1892; Volume 5: 1316/26. 1898; Volume 6: 1327/33. 1903 (from Volume 4 jointly with Konrad Wutke)
- Urkunden der Stadt Brieg. Max, Breslau 1870
- Geschichtsquellen der Hussitenkriege. Max, Breslau 1871
- Die Hussitenkämpfe der Schlesier 1420–1435. Hirt, Breslau 1872
- Wegweiser durch die schlesischen Geschichtsquellen bis zum Jahre 1550. Max, Breslau 1876; 2nd edition, 1889
- Geschichte des ersten schlesischen Krieges. 2 Volumes, Gotha, 1881
- mit Hermann Markgraf: Lehns- und Besitzurkunden Schlesiens und seiner einzelnen Fürstenthümer im Mittelalter. 2 Bände, Hirzel, Leipzig 1881 und 1883; Neudruck: Zeller, Osnabrück 1965
- Geschichte Schlesiens. 2 Bände, Perthes, Gotha 1884 und 1886; Volume 1: Bis zum Eintritt der habsburgischen Herrschaft 1527; Volume 2: Bis zur Vereinigung mit Preussen 1527–1740; Nachdruck: Ackerstaff & Kuballe, Osnabrück 1979
- Die alten schlesischen Landesfürsten und ihre Bedeutung. Nischkowsky, Breslau 1886
- Schlesien unter Friedrich dem Großen. Volume 1: 1740–1756. Koebner, Breslau 1890; Volume 2: 1756–1786. Koebner, Breslau 1892; Nachdruck: Olms, Hildesheim [u. a.] 2006, ISBN 978-3-487-13309-6 (Band 1), ISBN 978-3-487-13310-2 (Band 2), ISBN 978-3-487-13308-9 (Gesamtwerk)
- mit Franz Wachter: Akten des Kriegsgerichts von 1758 wegen der Kapitulation von Breslau am 24 November 1757. Max, Breslau 1895
- Zerboni und Held in ihren Konflikten mit der Staatsgewalt 1796–1802. F. Vahlen, Berlin 1897
- Schlesische Erinnerungen an Gustav Freytag. Gustav-Freytag-Gesellschaft, Kreuzburg 1910
