= Joannes Aurifaber Vimariensis =

German churchman, theologian, and a Protestant reformer

Joannes Aurifaber
- Born: Johann Goldschmidt; 1519; Weimar, Holy Roman Empire
- Died: 18 November, 1575; Erfurt, Holy Roman Empire
- Education: Martin-Luther-University Halle-Wittenberg
- Theological work
- Language: German

Joannes Aurifaber (1519 – November 18, 1575), born Johann Goldschmidt in Weimar, Germany, was a Lutheran churchman, theologian, and a Protestant reformer. Owing to a similarly-named contemporary, he is sometimes distinguished by the cognomen Vimariensis or Vinariensis ("of Weimar").

== Life ==
He studied at Wittenberg where he heard the lectures of Martin Luther, and afterwards became tutor to Count Mansfeldt. In the war of 1544–45 he accompanied the army as field-preacher, and then lived with Luther as his famulus or private secretary, being present at his death in 1546. In the following year he spent six months in prison with John Frederick I, Elector of Saxony, who had been captured by the emperor, Charles V.

He held for some years the office of court-preacher at Weimar, but owing to theological disputes was compelled to resign this office in 1561. In 1566 he was appointed to the Lutheran church at Erfurt, and there remained till his death in November 1575.

Besides taking a share in the first collected or Jena edition of Luther's works (1556), Aurifaber sought out and published at Eisleben in 1564–1565 several writings not included in that edition. He also published Luther's Letters (1556, 1565), and Table Talk (1566). This popular work, which has given him most of his fame, is unfortunately but a second or third hand compilation.

== See also ==
- Joannes Aurifaber Vratislaviensis

== Literature ==
- Gustav Hammann (1953). "Aurifaber, Johann". Neue Deutsche Biographie (in German). Vol. 1. Berlin: Duncker & Humblot. p. 456.
- Robert Stupperich: Reformatorenlexikon. Verlag Max Mohn, Gütersloh 1984, ISBN 3-579-00123-X
- Helmar Junghans: "Aurifaber, Johannes." In: Theologische Realenzyklopädie (TRE) Bd. 4, (1979), S.752–755, ISBN 3-11-007714-0
- Wagenmann, Gustav Kawerau: "Aurifaber, Johannes (Vinariensis)." In: Realenzyklopädie für protestantische Theologie und Kirche (RE), 3. Auflage, Bd. 2, (1897), S. 290–293
