= Georg Rörer =

German Lutheran theologian and clergyman

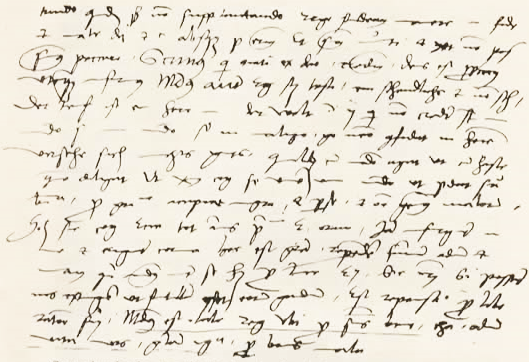
Georg Rörer's alphabetic shorthand system from 1527, excerpt from a lecture by Martin Luther on the First Epistle of John

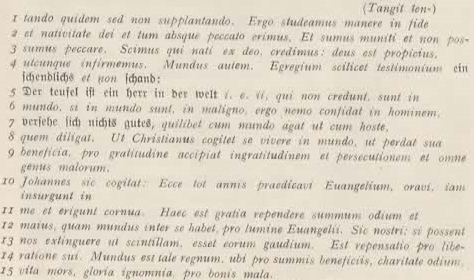
Transcription of the text above

Georg Rörer (Latin: Georgius Rorarius) (1 October 1492, Deggendorf – 24 April 1557 Jena) was a German Lutheran theologian, clergyman, Protestant reformer and stenographer of Martin Luther's sermons and lectures.

Georg Rörer began his studies at Leipzig University in 1511. He was awarded his Magister in 1520. From 1522, he continued his studies at the University of Wittenberg, where he met Martin Luther, Philipp Melanchthon and Johannes Bugenhagen. He was one of the first clergymen ordained to the office of deacon by Martin Luther in 1525.

He assisted as proof-reader in Martin Luther's work of translating the Bible (1522–1545) into the German language. He also served as Luther's secretary. In 1537, John Frederick I, Elector of Saxony exempted him from his ecclesiastical duties and officially commissioned him to work with the documentation of Luther's work. In this capacity, Rörer became one of the editors of Luther's Tischreden ("table talk") as well as a collected edition of Luther's works. He moved to Copenhagen in 1551 and to Halle in 1553.

== Other sources ==
- Kroker, Ernst. Röhrers Handschriftenbände und Luthers Tischreden. Archiv für Reformationsgeschichte (ARG)
- Georg Rörer (1492–1557). Der Chronist der Wittenberger Reformation (Evangelische Verlagsanstalt) ISBN 9783374030026
