= 1552 =

1552 in various calendars
- Gregorian calendar: 1552; MDLII
- Ab urbe condita: 2305
- Armenian calendar: 1001; ԹՎ ՌԱ
- Assyrian calendar: 6302
- Balinese saka calendar: 1473–1474
- Bengali calendar: 958–959
- Berber calendar: 2502
- English Regnal year: 5 Edw. 6 – 6 Edw. 6
- Buddhist calendar: 2096
- Burmese calendar: 914
- Byzantine calendar: 7060–7061
- Chinese calendar: 辛亥年 (Metal Pig); 4249 or 4042 — to — 壬子年 (Water Rat); 4250 or 4043
- Coptic calendar: 1268–1269
- Discordian calendar: 2718
- Ethiopian calendar: 1544–1545
- Hebrew calendar: 5312–5313
- Hindu calendars
- Vikram Samvat: 1608–1609
- Shaka Samvat: 1473–1474
- Kali Yuga: 4652–4653
- Holocene calendar: 11552
- Igbo calendar: 552–553
- Iranian calendar: 930–931
- Islamic calendar: 958–960
- Japanese calendar: Tenbun 21 (天文２１年)
- Javanese calendar: 1470–1471
- Julian calendar: 1552; MDLII
- Korean calendar: 3885
- Minguo calendar: 360 before ROC 民前360年
- Nanakshahi calendar: 84
- Thai solar calendar: 2094–2095
- Tibetan calendar: ལྕགས་མོ་ཕག་ལོ་ (female Iron-Boar); 1678 or 1297 or 525 — to — ཆུ་ཕོ་བྱི་བ་ལོ་ (male Water-Rat); 1679 or 1298 or 526

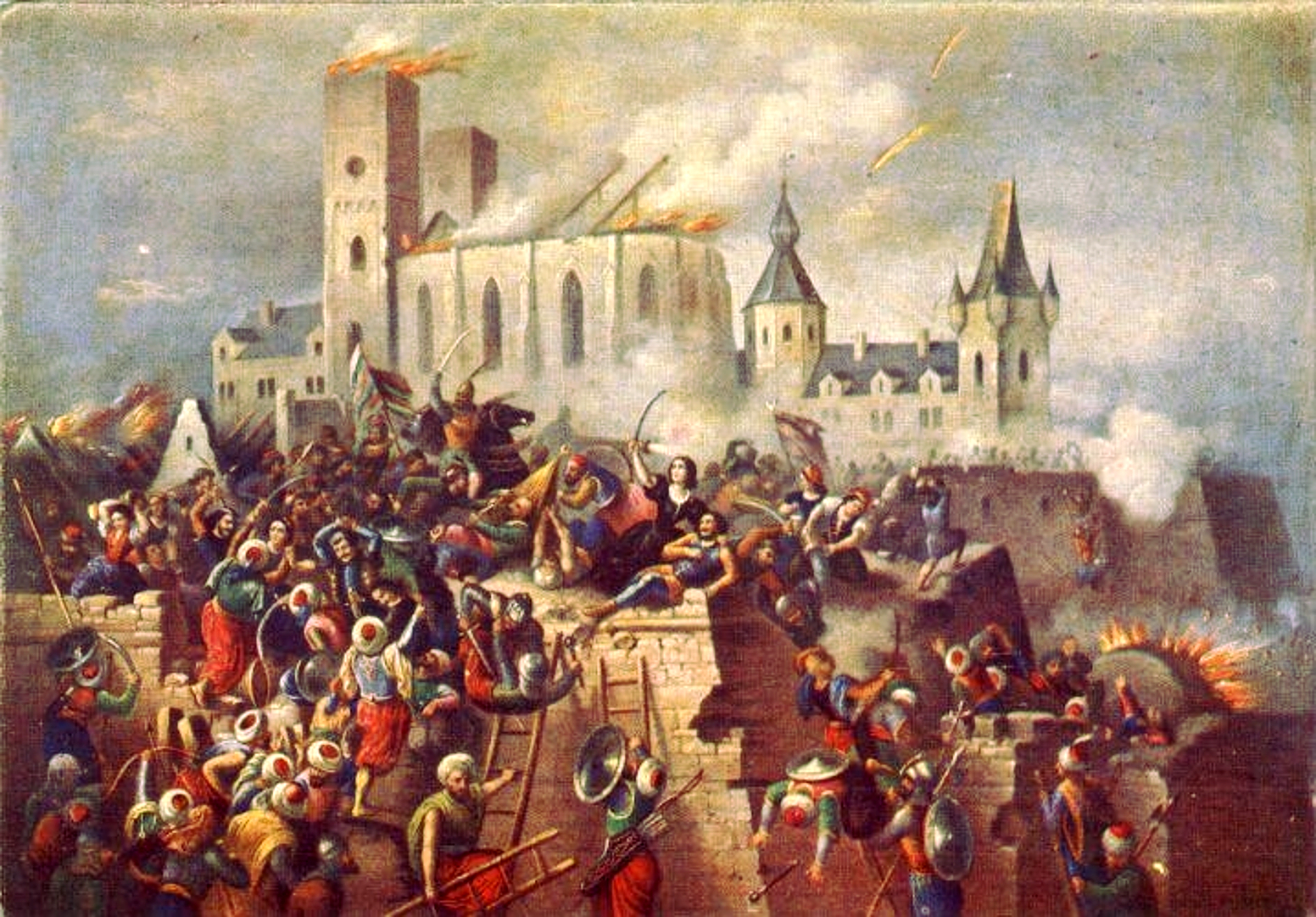
September 9: The Siege of Eger begins.

Year 1552 (MDLII) was a leap year starting on Friday of the Julian calendar.

== Events ==
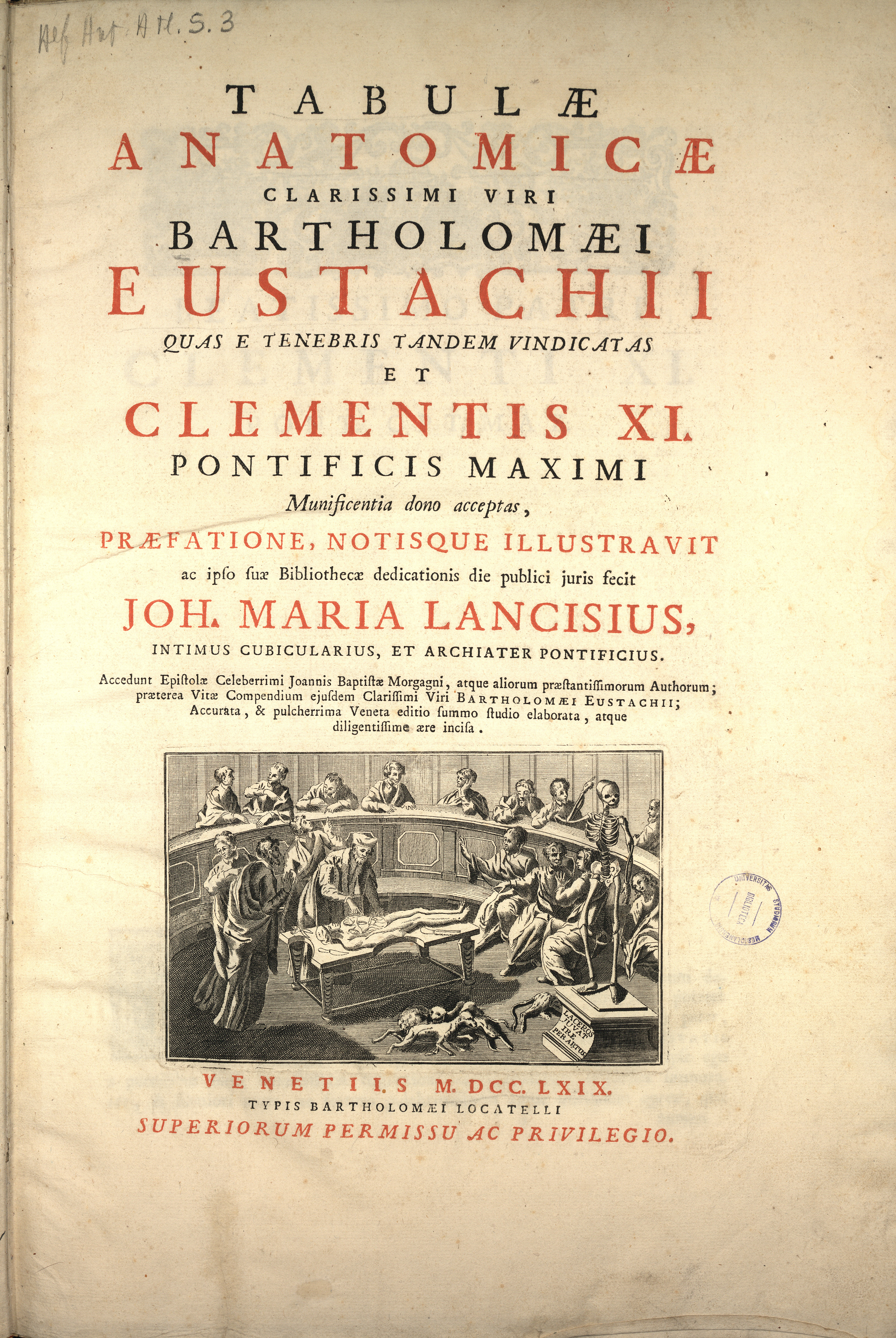
Bartolomeo Eustachi completes his Tabulae anatomicae.

=== January–March ===
- January 15 – Henry II of France and Maurice, Elector of Saxony, sign the Treaty of Chambord.
- February 12 – Pedro de Valdivia founds the Chilean city of Valdivia, as Santa María la Blanca de Valdivia.
- February 24 – The privileges of the Hanseatic League are abolished in England.
- March 26 – Guru Amar Das becomes the Third Sikh Guru.

=== April–June ===
- April 8 – Maurice, Elector of Saxony, liberates Augsburg and sets about to capture Charles V, Holy Roman Emperor.
- April 11 – Metz Cathedral is consecrated.
- April 15 – The Act of Uniformity is given royal assent and imposes use of the Protestant Book of Common Prayer on England.
- April 16 – Pedro de Valdivia founds the city of La Imperial, Chile.
- April 18 – King Henry II of France enters the city of Metz, ceded to France by Saxony by the January 15 Treaty of Chambord.
- April 28 – The delegates to the Council of Trent adjourn for two years after learning that the Holy Roman Emperor is fleeing from Maurice of Saxony.
- May 20 – Learning of the rapid approach of the Elector Maurice, the Emperor Charles V flees from Innsbruck ahead of being captured.
- June 6 (14th waxing of Waso 914 ME) – Minye Sithu is appointed as the Burmese Viceroy of Martaban by his older brother, Bayinnaung, King of Burma.
- June 16 – Yuri of Uglich, the only brother of the Russian Tsar Ivan the Terrible, is placed in charge of Russia's domestic affairs as Ivan departs Moscow to lead 150,000 troops in the Russo-Kazan War.
- June 22 – Peter Ernst I von Mansfeld-Vorderort, the Spanish Governor of Luxembourg, is taken prisoner by France and remains captive for almost five years.
- June 24 – The Portuguese ship São João is wrecked off of the coast of South Africa. While 480 people survive initially, all but 25 of them die during the next 165 days while trying to reach the mouth of the Maputo River in what is now Mozambique.

=== July–September ===
- July 6 – In Hungary, Drégely Castle is attacked by the Ottoman Empire. Captain György Szondy and c. 140 soldiers in the castle die, after 4 days of fighting against 8,000 Turkish raiders.
- July 27 – The Ottomans capture the city of Temesvar.
- August 2
  - John Frederick, Elector of Saxony and Philipp I of Hesse, taken prisoner by Charles V in 1546, are released.
  - The Peace of Passau revokes the Augsburg Interim of 1548, and promises religious freedom to the Protestant princes.
- September 9 – The Siege of Eger begins as thousands of Ottoman troops, led by General Kara Ahmed Pasha of the Ottoman Empire attack a greatly outnumbered force of Hungarian defenders, captained by István Dobó.
- September 24 – The Debatable Lands on the border of England and Scotland are divided between the two kingdoms by a commission creating the Scots' Dike in an unsuccessful attempt to halt lawlessness here, but giving both countries their modern borders.

=== October–December ===
- October 2 – The Khanate of Kazan falls to troops of Ivan IV of Russia.
- October 17 – After heavy losses by the Ottoman Empire, the Siege of Eger in Hungary is broken off by the Ottomans.
- November 15 – Radu Ilie Haidăul becomes the new Prince of Wallachia in what is now Romania after defeating Prince Mircea the Shepherd at the battle of Mănești. Prince Mircea retakes the throne seven months later.
- November 18 – Simeon Sulaka arrives in Rome from the Middle Eastern city of Mosul and brings a letter asking Pope Julius III to appoint him as the Patriarch of the Church of the East, leader of the Chaldean Catholic Church.
- November 24 – Thomas Cranmer, Archbishop of Canterbury and top cleric of the Church of England, delivers the proposed Forty-two Articles to the Privy Council of King Edward VI.
- December 26 – Pope Julius III issues a papal brief revoking resolutions passed by the colegii Papal State of Bologna in Italy.

=== Date unknown ===
- Miguel de Buría leads the first African rebellion in South America's history. This may be because Buría has more slaves than other regions in Venezuela, of which most join Miguel, and is still being contested between the Europeans and the natives, who also join his side. During this insurrection he takes over the Gold mines de San Felipe de Buría, established within the area with the consent of the Spanish Crown, to pull out the ore that was discovered in the Buria river, a task that heavily depends on slave work.
- In the Persian Gulf, the Ottoman Empire Red Sea Fleet attacks the Portuguese stronghold of Hormuz, but fails to capture it.
- In Italy, Bartolomeo Eustachi completes his Tabulae anatomicae, presenting his discoveries on the structure of the inner ear and heart, although, for fear of the Inquisition, it will not be published until 1714.
- King Edward VI of England founds 35 grammar schools by royal charter, including Shrewsbury; Leeds Grammar School is also established.

== Births ==
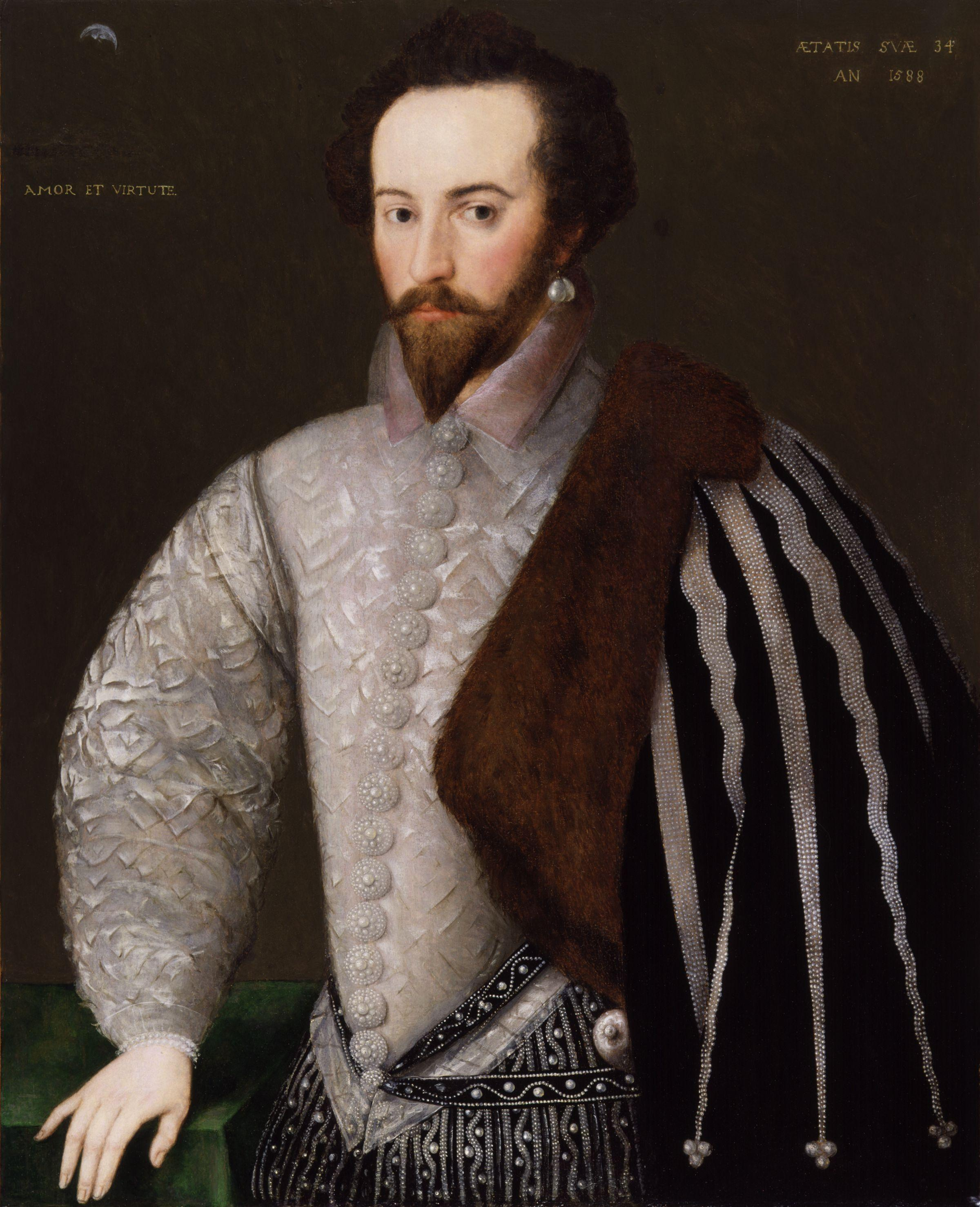
Walter Raleigh

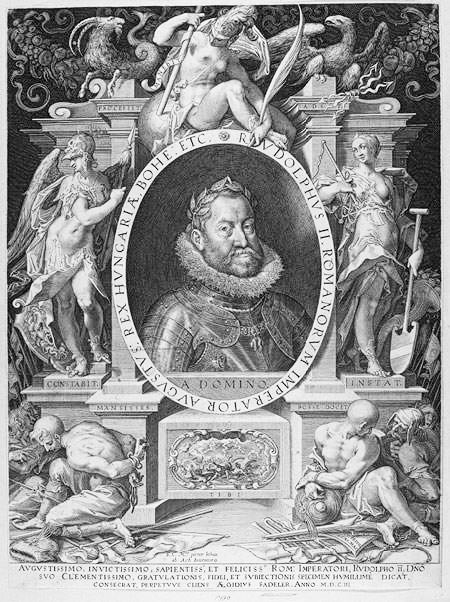
Rudolf II, Holy Roman Emperor

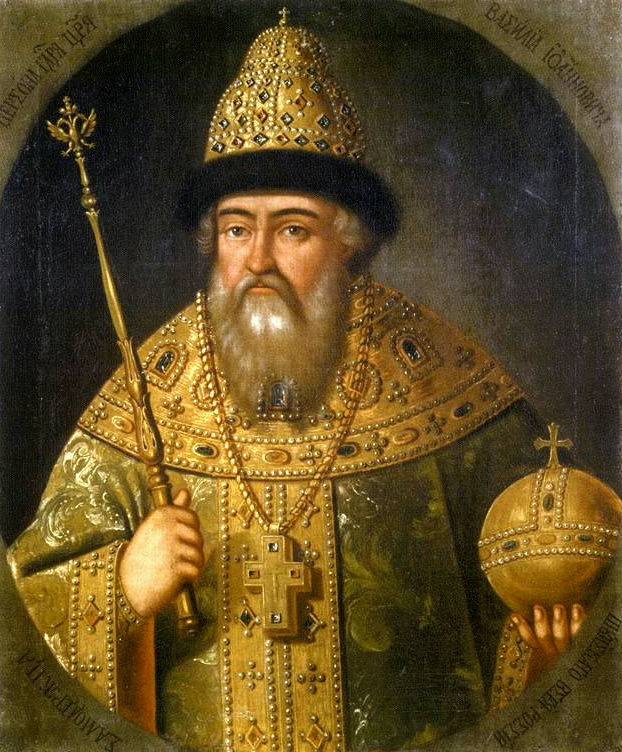
Vasili IV of Russia

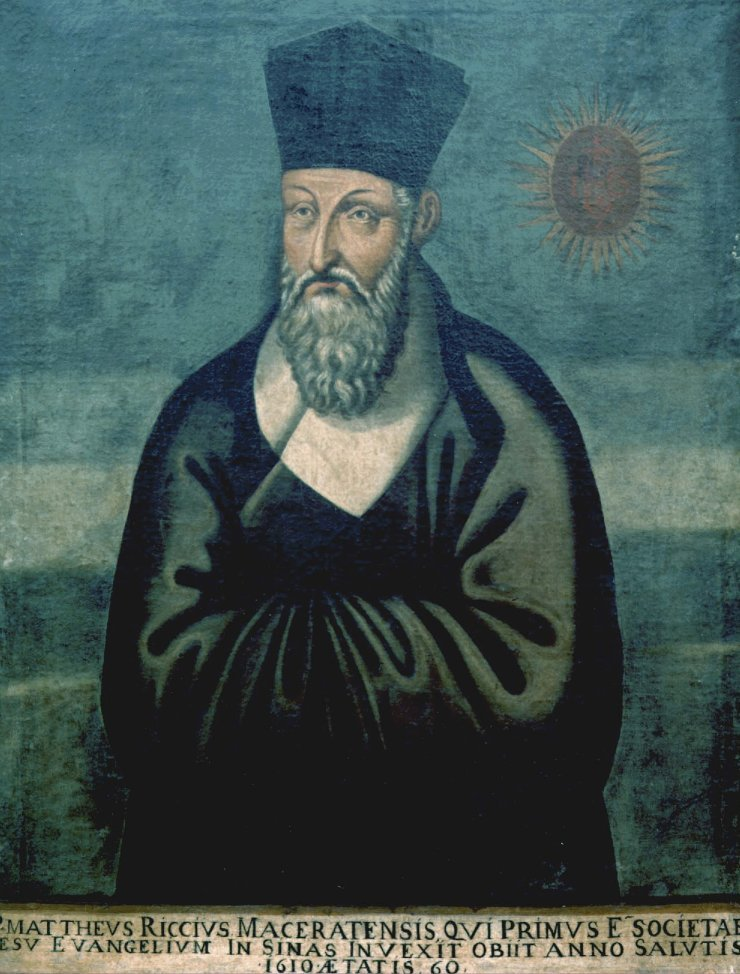
Matteo Ricci

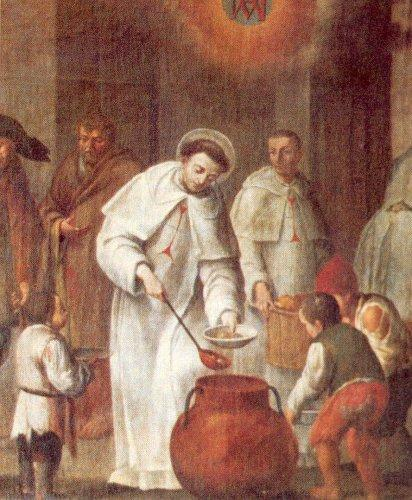
Simón de Rojas

- January 14 – Alberico Gentili, Italian jurist (d. 1608)
- January 22 – Walter Raleigh, English explorer (d. 1618)
- February 1 – Edward Coke, English colonial entrepreneur and jurist (d. 1634)
- February 8 – Agrippa d'Aubigné, French poet and soldier (d. 1630)
- February 19 – Melchior Klesl, Austrian statesman and cardinal (d. 1630)
- February 20 – Sengoku Hidehisa, Japanese daimyō (d. 1614)
- February 25 – Magdalene of Lippe, Countess of Lippe by birth, and by marriage Landgravine of Hesse-Darmstadt (d. 1587)
- February 28 – Joost Bürgi, Swiss clockmaker and mathematician (d. 1632)
- March 1 – Anna of Cleves, Duchess of Jülich-Cleves-Berg by birth and by marriage Countess Palatine of Neuburg (d. 1632)
- March 18 – Polykarp Leyser the Elder, German theologian (d. 1610)
- March 20 – Christoph, Count of Hohenzollern-Haigerloch (d. 1592)
- April 20 – Frederick IV of Liegnitz, German noble (d. 1596)
- May 8 – Petrus Ryff, Swiss scientist (d. 1629)
- May 12 – Edmund Bowyer, English politician (d. 1627)
- June 2 – Raja Wodeyar I, King of Mysore (d. 1617)
- June 8 – Gabriello Chiabrera, Italian poet (d. 1638)
- June 17 – John George of Ohlau, Duke of Oława and Wołów (1586-1592) (d. 1592)
- June 29 – Elizabeth Spencer, Baroness Hunsdon, English baroness (d. 1618)
- July 18 – Rudolf II, Holy Roman Emperor (d. 1612)
- July 22
  - Anthony Browne, Sheriff of Surrey and Kent (d. 1592)
  - Mary Wriothesley, Countess of Southampton, Lady of English peer and others (d. 1607)
- August 1 – Isabella Feltria della Rovere, Italian noblewoman (d. 1619)
- August 14 – Paolo Sarpi, Italian writer (d. 1623)
- August 21 – Muhammad Qadiri, Founder of the Naushahia branch of the Qadri order (d. 1654)
- August 24 – Lavinia Fontana, Italian painter (d. 1614)
- September 12 – Andreas Schott, Flemish academic, linguist, translator, editor and a Jesuit priest (d. 1629)
- September 20 – Lorenz Scholz von Rosenau, German botanist (d. 1599)
- September 21 – Barbara Longhi, Italian painter (d. 1638)
- September 22 – Tsar Vasili IV of Russia (d. 1612)
- September 27 – Flaminio Scala, Italian playwright and stage actor (d. 1624)
- October 6 – Matteo Ricci, Italian Jesuit missionary to China (d. 1610)
- October 11 – Tsarevich Dmitry Ivanovich of Russia, Grand Prince of Moscow (d. 1553)
- October 18
  - Elisabeth of Saxony, Countess Palatine of Simmern (d. 1590)
  - Francis Cherry, English diplomat (d. 1605)
- October 23 – Odet de Turnèbe, French dramatist (d. 1581)
- October 28 – Simón de Rojas, Spanish saint (d. 1624)
- December 18 – Ahmad Ibn al-Qadi, Moroccan writer, judge and mathematician (d. 1616)
- November 20 – Gilbert Talbot, 7th Earl of Shrewsbury, English politician and Earl (d. 1616)
- November 26 – Seonjo of Joseon, King of Joseon (d. 1608)
- December 27 – William Cavendish, 1st Earl of Devonshire, English politician and Earl (d. 1626)
- December 29 – Henri I de Bourbon, prince de Condé (d. 1588)
- December 31 – Simon Forman, English occultist and astrologer (d. 1611)
- Date unknown:
  - Hans von Aachen, German mannerist painter (d. 1615)
  - Thomas Aufield, English Catholic martyr (d. 1585)
  - Jean Bertaut, French poet (d. 1611)
  - Philemon Holland, English translator (d. 1637)
  - Prince Masahito, Japanese prince (d. 1586)
  - Lady Saigō, Japanese concubine (d. 1589)
  - Dom Justo Takayama, Japanese daimyo (d. 1615)
  - Anthony Tyrrell, Roman Catholic renegade priest and spy (d. circa 1610)
  - Jean Hotman, Marquis de Villers-St-Paul, French diplomat (d. 1636)
  - Cvijeta Zuzorić, Croatian poet (d. 1648)
- probable
  - Miguel de Benavides, Spanish clergyman and sinologist (d. 1605)
  - Francisco Goméz de Sandoval y Rojas, Duke of Lerma, Spanish politician (d. 1625)

== Deaths ==
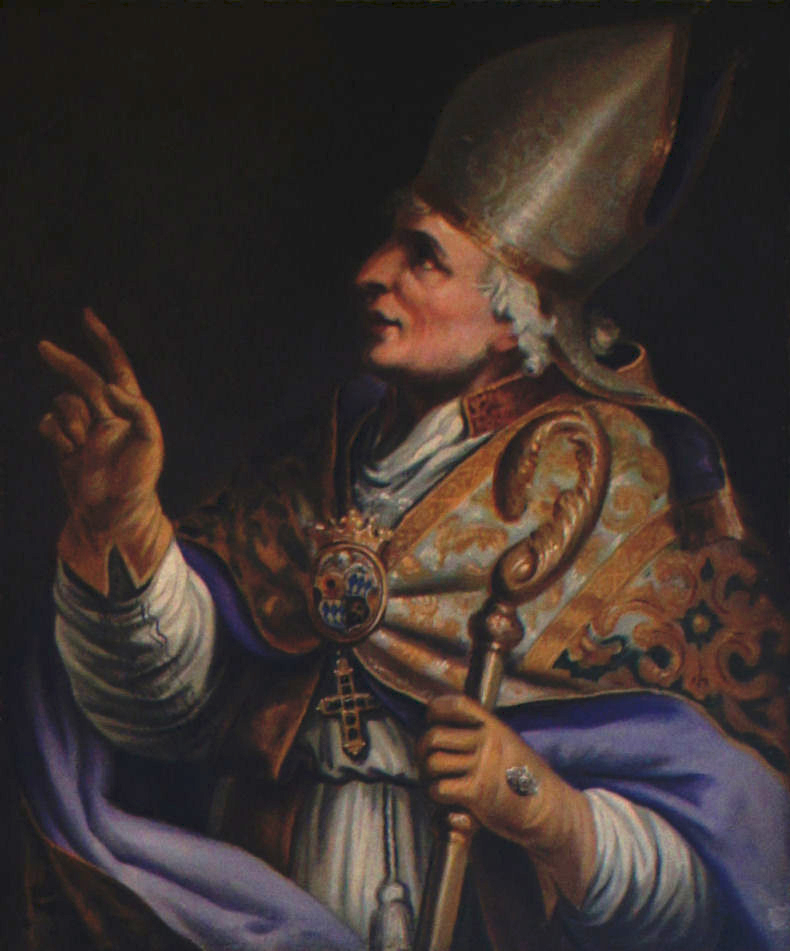
Henry of the Palatinate

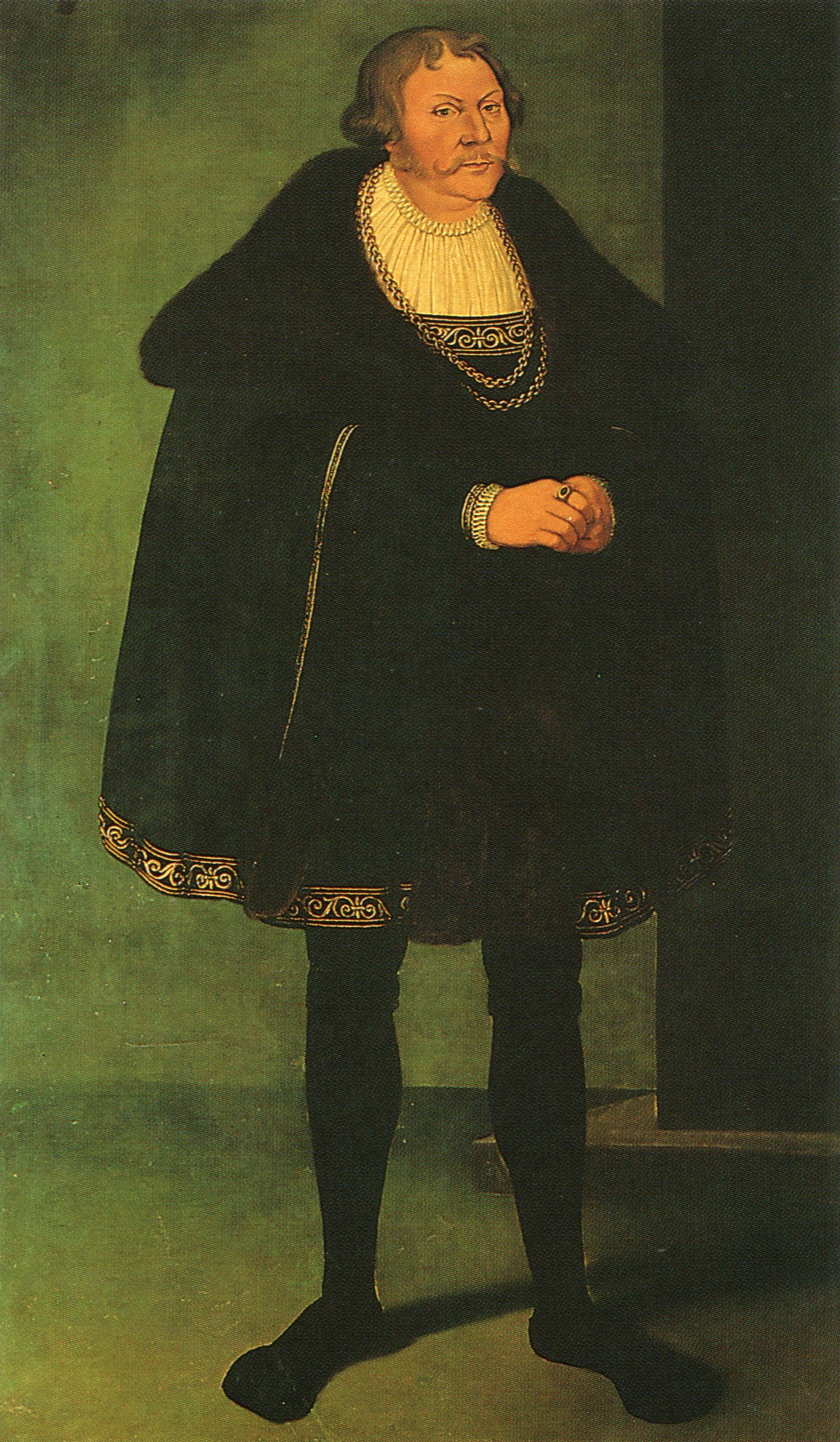
Henry V, Duke of Mecklenburg

Saint Francis Xavier

- January 3 – Henry of the Palatinate, bishop of Utrecht (b. 1487)
- January 10 – Johann Cochlaeus, German humanist and controversialist (b. 1479)
- January 22 – Edward Seymour, 1st Duke of Somerset, English politician (b. 1509)
- February 6 – Henry V, Duke of Mecklenburg (b. 1479)
- February 20 – Anne Parr, Countess of Pembroke, English countess (b. 1515)
- February 26 – Heinrich Faber, German composer (b. 1500)
- March 29 – Guru Angad, Indian religious leader (b. 1504)
- April 19 – Olaus Petri, Swedish clergyman (b. 1493)
- April 18 – John Leland, English historian (b. 1502)
- April 21 – Petrus Apianus, German astronomer (b. 1495)
- May 26 – Sebastian Münster, German cartographer and cosmographer (b. 1488)
- June 10 – Alexander Barclay, British poet (b. 1476)
- July 9 – György Szondy, Hungarian soldier
- August 15 – Hermann of Wied, German Catholic archbishop (b. 1477)
- September 23 – Barbara of Brandenburg-Ansbach-Kulmbach, Landgravine of Leuchtenberg (b. 1495)
- October 14 – Oswald Myconius, Swiss Protestant reformer (b. 1488)
- October 17 – Andreas Osiander, German Protestant theologian (b. 1498)
- November 10 – Günther XL, Count of Schwarzburg (b. 1499)
- December 3 – Francis Xavier, Spanish Jesuit missionary and saint (b. 1506)
- December 20 – Katharina von Bora, wife of Martin Luther (b. 1499)
