= Siege of Drégely =

Siege of Drégely (1552)
- Part of Habsburg–Ottoman war of 1551–1562
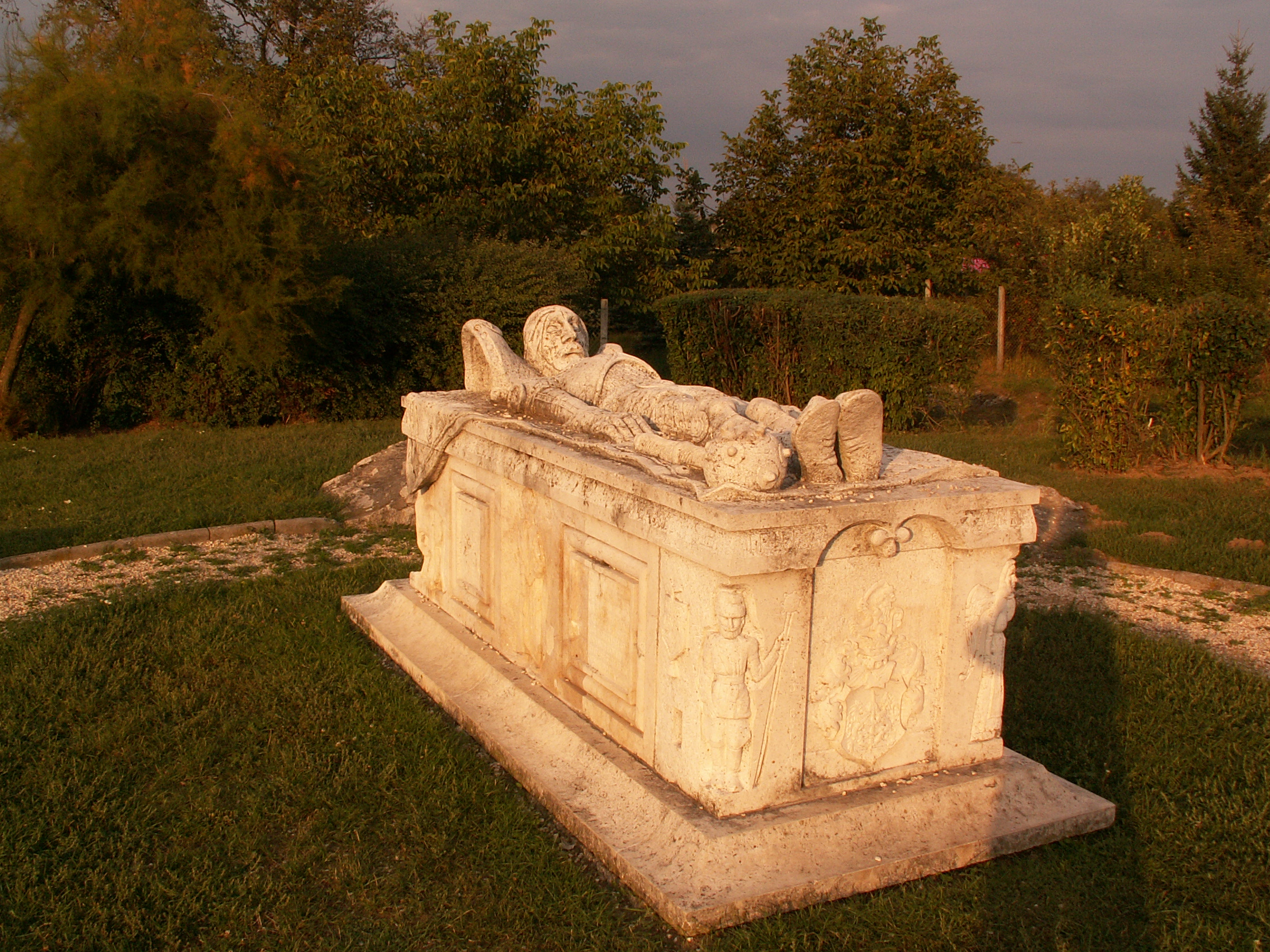
- Tomb of György Szondy
Date	5–9 July 1552
Location	Drégely Castle, Hungary
Result	Ottoman victory

Belligerents
Holy Roman Empire: Kingdom of Hungary	Ottoman Empire

Commanders and leaders
György Szondy †; János Zoltay †	Hadim Ali Pasha of Buda

Strength
150 men	8,000–10,000 men

Casualties and losses
140 killed 10 captured	Unknown

The siege of Drégely was a military engagement between the Hungarian Habsburg garrison and the Ottomans who besieged the castle. The Ottomans besieged Drégely, which was a small castle. It was defended by György Szondy with few men. After a few days of siege, the castle fell, with all defenders killed after heroic defense.

== Background ==
After the capture of Veszprém, Ali Hadim Pasha set the first goal of his next military operations to be the capture of Drégely. Drégely was a very small fortress at that time. The castle was built to protect against internal disturbances and sudden attacks by marauding knights or ordinary bandits. It has at most 150 men led by the captain, György Szondy. The castle was in poor condition, with weak walls and no cannons or gunpowder. Szondy had Lieutenant János Zoltay with him in defense. Szondy is determined to resist instead of surrendering, knowing that no reinforcements won't arrive.

== Siege ==
Ali Pasha arrived in Drégely with a force of 8,000–10,000 men on July 5, 1552. He began digging trenches and preparing the cannons with 4 heavy wall cannons and 6 field cannons. On the next day, the Ottomans bombarded the castle's tower, which protected the gate, killing János Zoltay and burying him. The fortress became suitable for assault, but before any assault was launched, Ali Pasha dispatched a priest to call Szondy to surrender, but he refused. Ali then dispatched two young servants to Szondy, asking him to raise them as knights and that in case he died, they would bury him honorably. Once again, he refused. Shortly before the attack, Szondy burned his possessions so that they wouldn't fall to the Ottomans On July 9, the Ottomans launched their assault. Rushing to the castle, they could not be stopped. A short but fierce battle ensued. Szondy was wounded but continued to fight until he was killed. The majority of men were dead except for 10 Hungarian Hadjuks who were taken captive.

The Ottomans, out of respect for the fallen captain, buried him with full military honors and planted his flag-bearing spear on his grave.

== Aftermath ==
Due to this victory, the Ottomans managed to capture nearby fortresses, which surrendered voluntarily.

== Sources ==
- József Bánlaky: Military history of the Hungarian nation (MEK-OSZK), 0014/1149. The fall of Drégely; after that, several fortresses along the Ipoly River surrender voluntarily.
- Jenő Horváth (1895), Hungarian War Chronicle—the military history of the thousand-year struggles of the Hungarian nation.
- Gabor Szantai (2021), 33 Castles, Battles, Legends.
