= Kodály körönd =

Urban square in Budapest, Hungary

Coordinates: 47°30′34.96″N 19°4′12.12″E

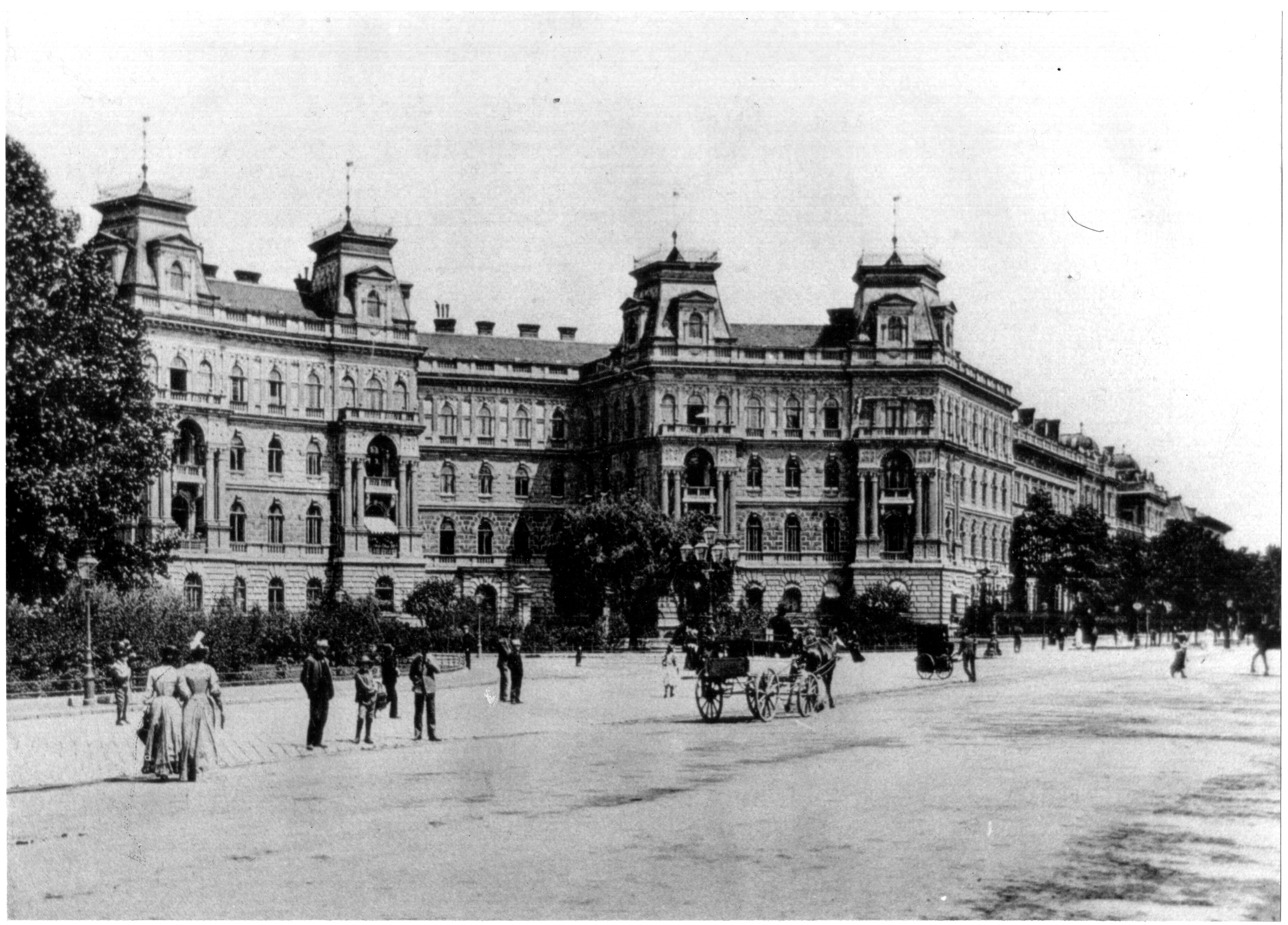
Körönd 4 - 1895

Kodály körönd is a circus in Budapest, Hungary, at the intersection of Andrássy Avenue and Felsőerdősor u., with beautifully painted old buildings and statues of four of Hungary's great heroes in each corner. It is also a station on the yellow M1 (Millennium Underground) line of the Budapest Metro. The four heroes are:

- György Szondy (1500–1552) - Hero against the Ottoman invasion who, on July 9, 1552, with his troops, stood his ground against Ali Pasha when those in neighboring castles fled.
- Miklós Zrínyi (1508–1566) - Defender of the Kingdom of Hungary against the Ottomans.
- Bálint Balassi (1554–1594) - Celebrated poet during the same war against the Ottomans, giving voice to love and honor.
- János Bottyán (1643–1709) – "Blind Bottyán" – popular name of Bottyán János, who fought against the Ottomans under the Habsburgs, liberating Buda, but who later became a general in the war of independence against the Habsburgs under Francis II Rákóczi, 1705. He is "blind" because he lost an eye while fighting the Ottomans.

The four buildings on the square form a full circle, with Andrássy út and Szinyei Merse utca intersecting in the middle. There are no turns at the intersection, but one can use a surrounding rotary instead, and the heroes are in each pie-quarter cut out by the intersection and the rotary.

The circus was named Körönd (circus) from the 1890s, Hitler Adolf tér (Adolf Hitler square) from 1938, renamed Körönd in 1945, then, in 1971, named after Zoltán Kodály who once lived in one of the buildings there. Körönd and its renaming in the 1930s play a central role in Vilmos Kondor's 2012 novel Budapest Noir.

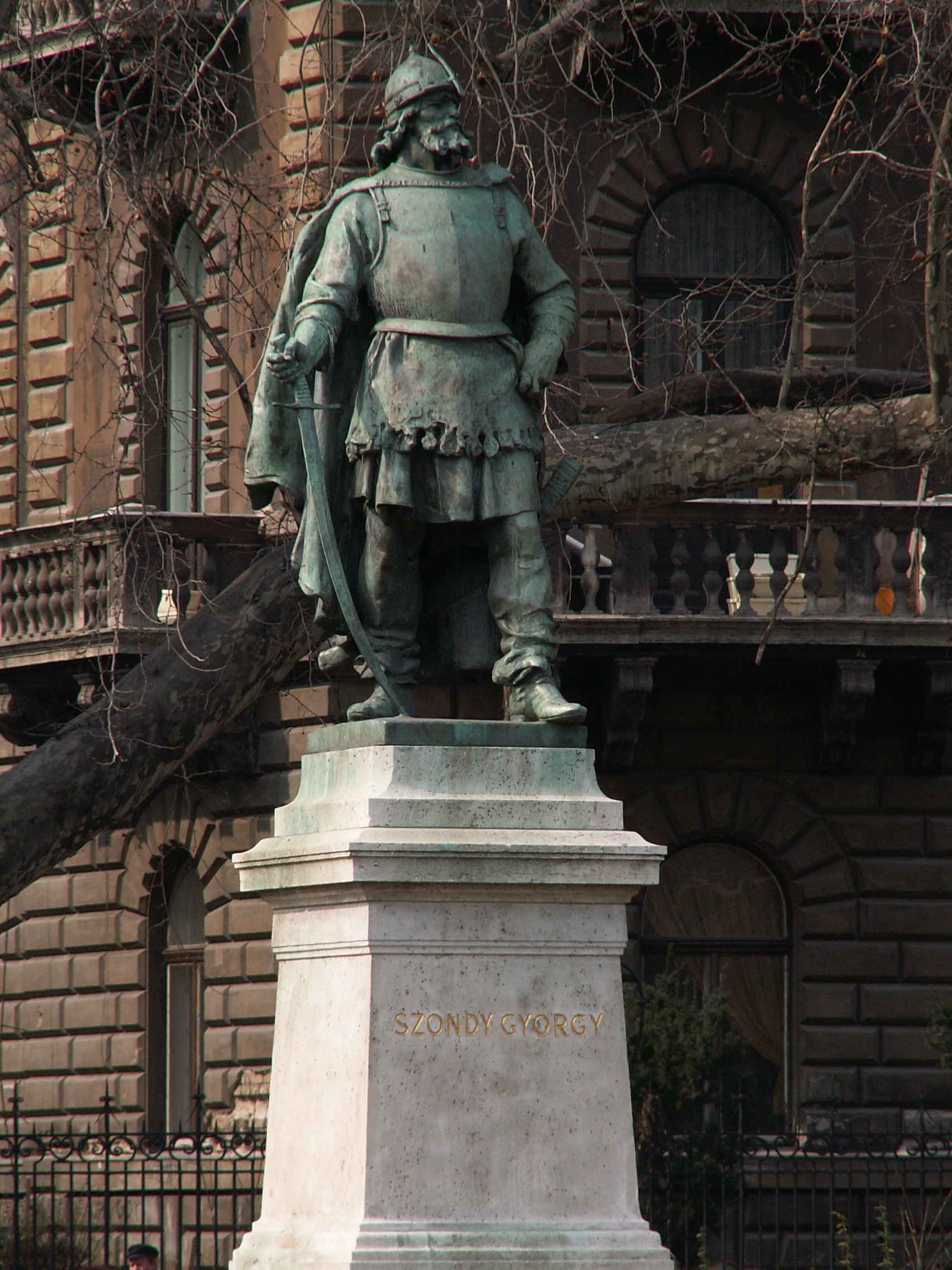
Statue of György Szondy

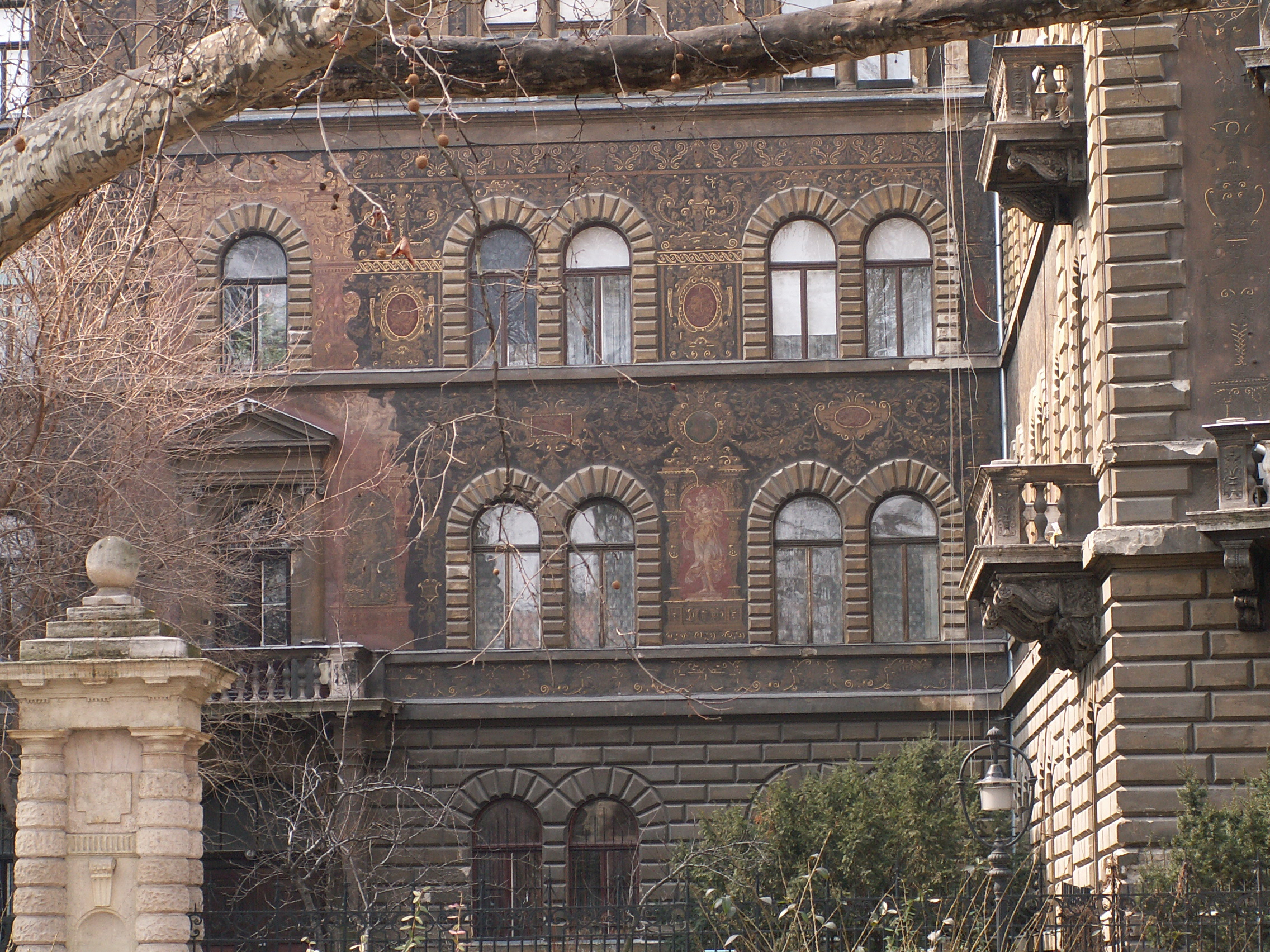
Mural on a building

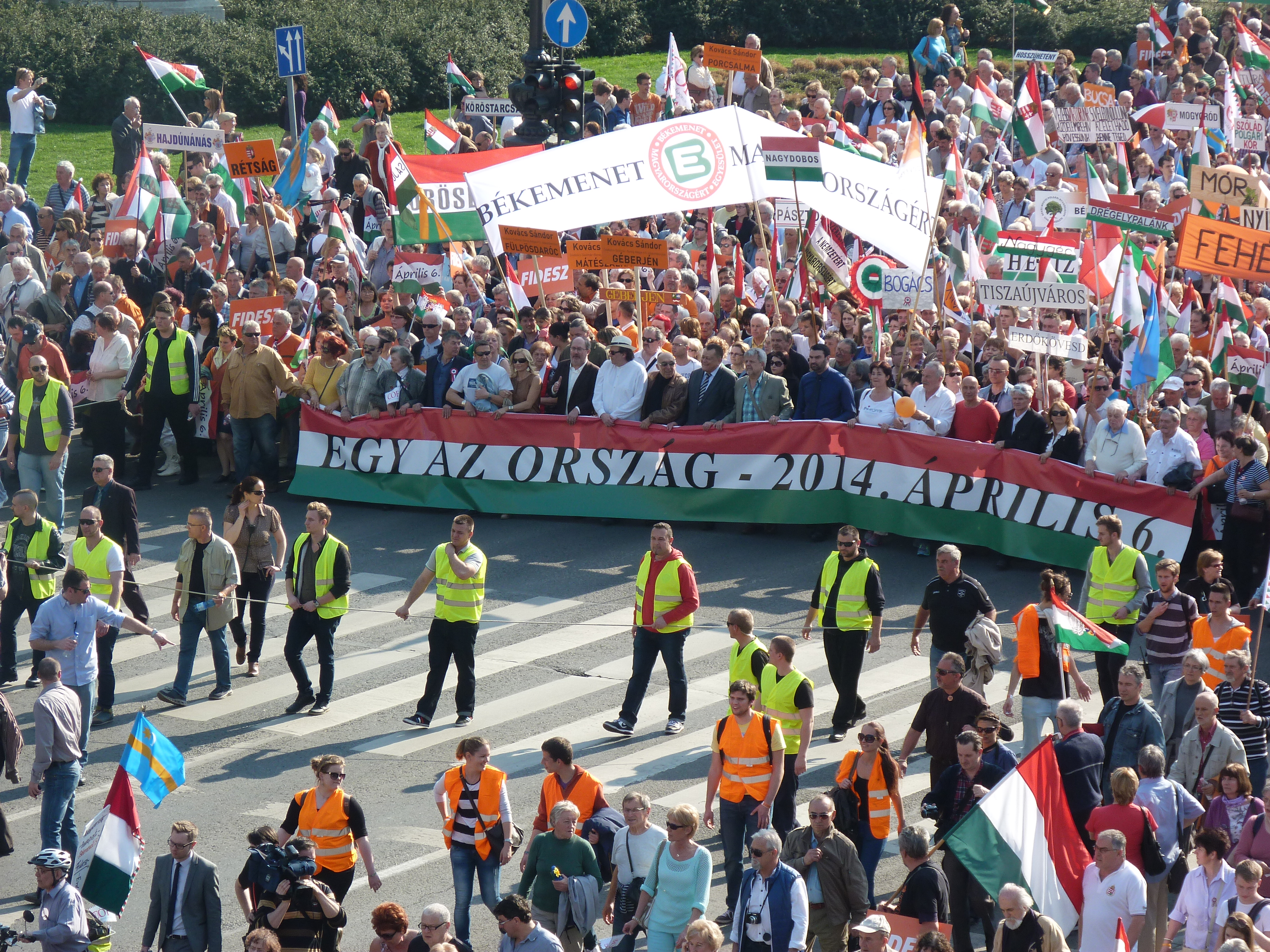
Peace March for Hungary (29 March 2014)

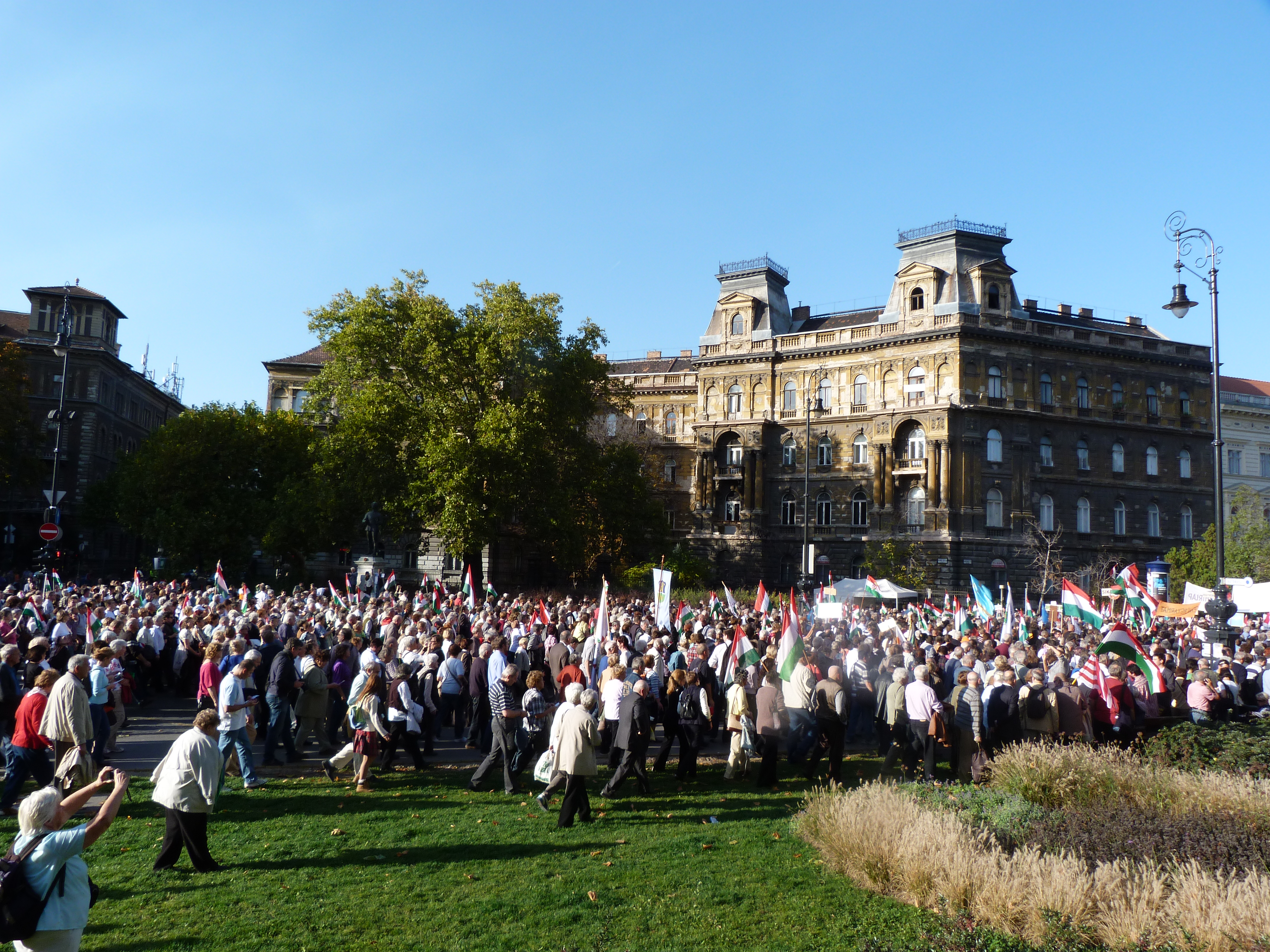
Demonstration
