= György Szondy =

Hungarian soldier

Szondy György
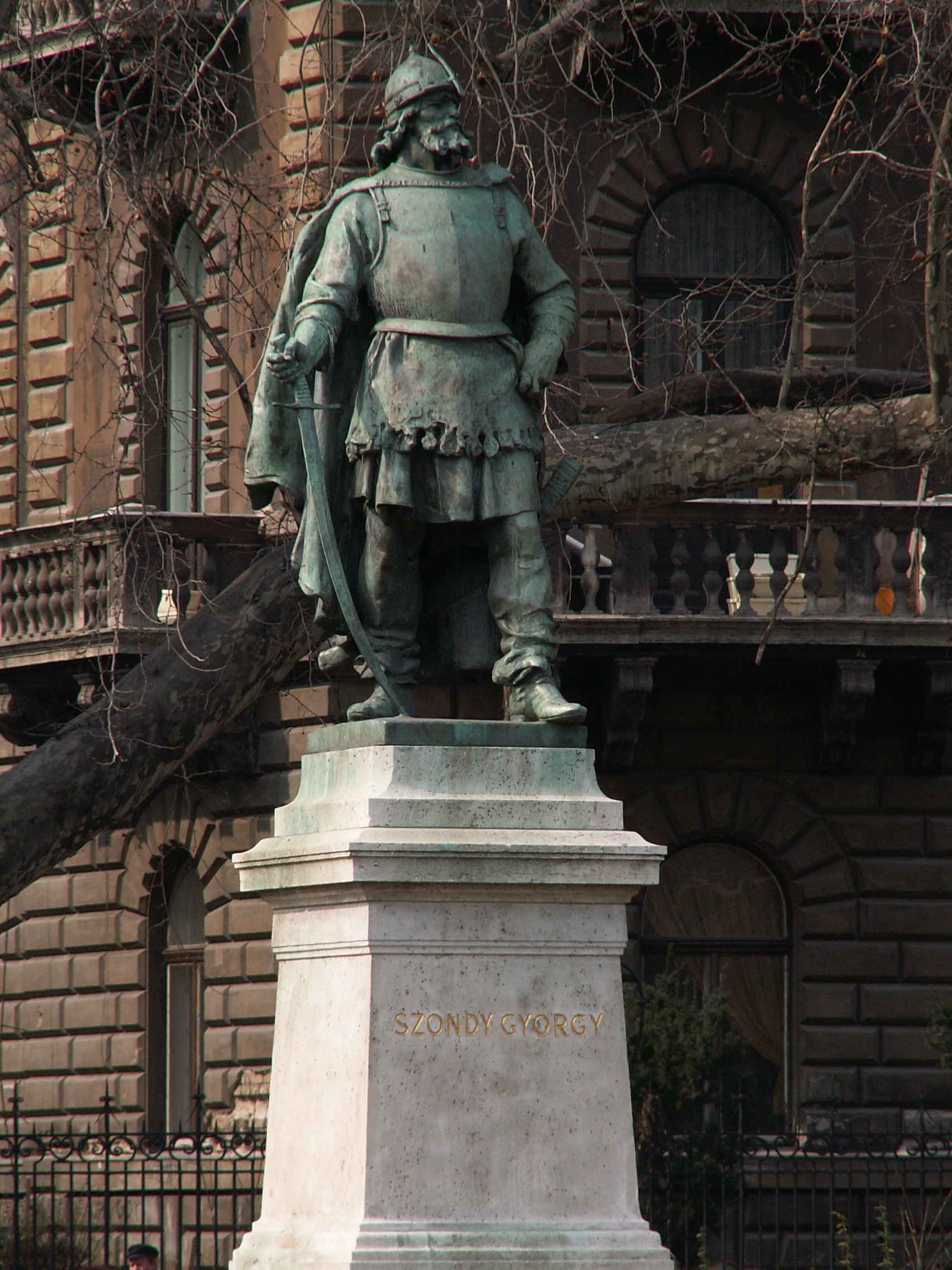
- Statue of Szondy on Kodály körönd, Budapest
- Born: 1500; Turóc County, Kingdom of Hungary
- Died: 9 July 1552 (aged 51–52); Drégely Castle
- Burial place: Drégelypalánk, Nógrád County, Hungary
- Relatives: Jakab Szondy (brother)
- Military career
- Allegiance: Kingdom of Hungary
- Branch: Border defense forces
- Service years: c. 1515–1552 (approx. 37 years)
- Rank: Captain (Várkapitány)
- Nickname: Suhó
- Unit: Border infantry / Garrison forces
- Commands: Garrison of Drégely Castle
- Conflicts: Battle of Mohács; Siege of Drégely Castle (1552)

György Szondy (also spelled Szondi; c. 1504 – July 9, 1552) was a Hungarian military commander and the captain of Drégely Castle. He is celebrated as a national hero for his valiant, last-stand defense of the fortress against the overwhelming forces of the Ottoman Empire during the 1552 campaign. His fierce bravery earned the deep respect of his enemy, Hadim Ali Pasha, who ordered an honorable military funeral for him after his death.

== Origins and Early Life ==
Szondy’s origins were likely non-aristocratic, emerging from an urban burgher (merchant) family or potentially a serf background. Although historical documents occasionally addressed him with the noble honorific egregius (used for lesser nobility since the 15th century), this was likely due to his military rank or perhaps a personal grant of nobility. His surname appears in various contemporary records, alternating between "Szondy" and "Szondi."

His only known sibling, a brother named Jakab Szondy, was certainly a commoner. When Jakab petitioned King Ferdinand for a land grant or annuity based on his brother's heroic sacrifice, documents referred to him as circumspectus, a title reserved for urban citizens. Furthermore, family documents reveal that their original family name was Suhó (or Szuhó), and György later adopted the name Szondy. The name likely derives from Szond (modern-day Szonta in Serbia), suggesting that the family migrated north from the southern borderlands (Srem/Délvidék) under the protection of the Révay family following the catastrophic Battle of Mohács (1526) to escape Ottoman expansion.

In his youth, György was taken in by Ferenc Révay, who educated him and trained him in the arts of warfare at Sklabiňa (Szklabinya) Castle. Szondy frequently expressed deep gratitude toward Révay in his surviving letters, which highlight his strong sense of duty, loyalty, and integrity. Through military service in the border fortresses (végvár), he rose steadily through the ranks. By the mid-1540s, following the fall of Esztergom and Nógrád, Archbishop Pál Várday of Esztergom appointed him castellan of the Drégely estate and commander of the castle.

== Historical Role and the Siege of Drégely Castle (1552) ==
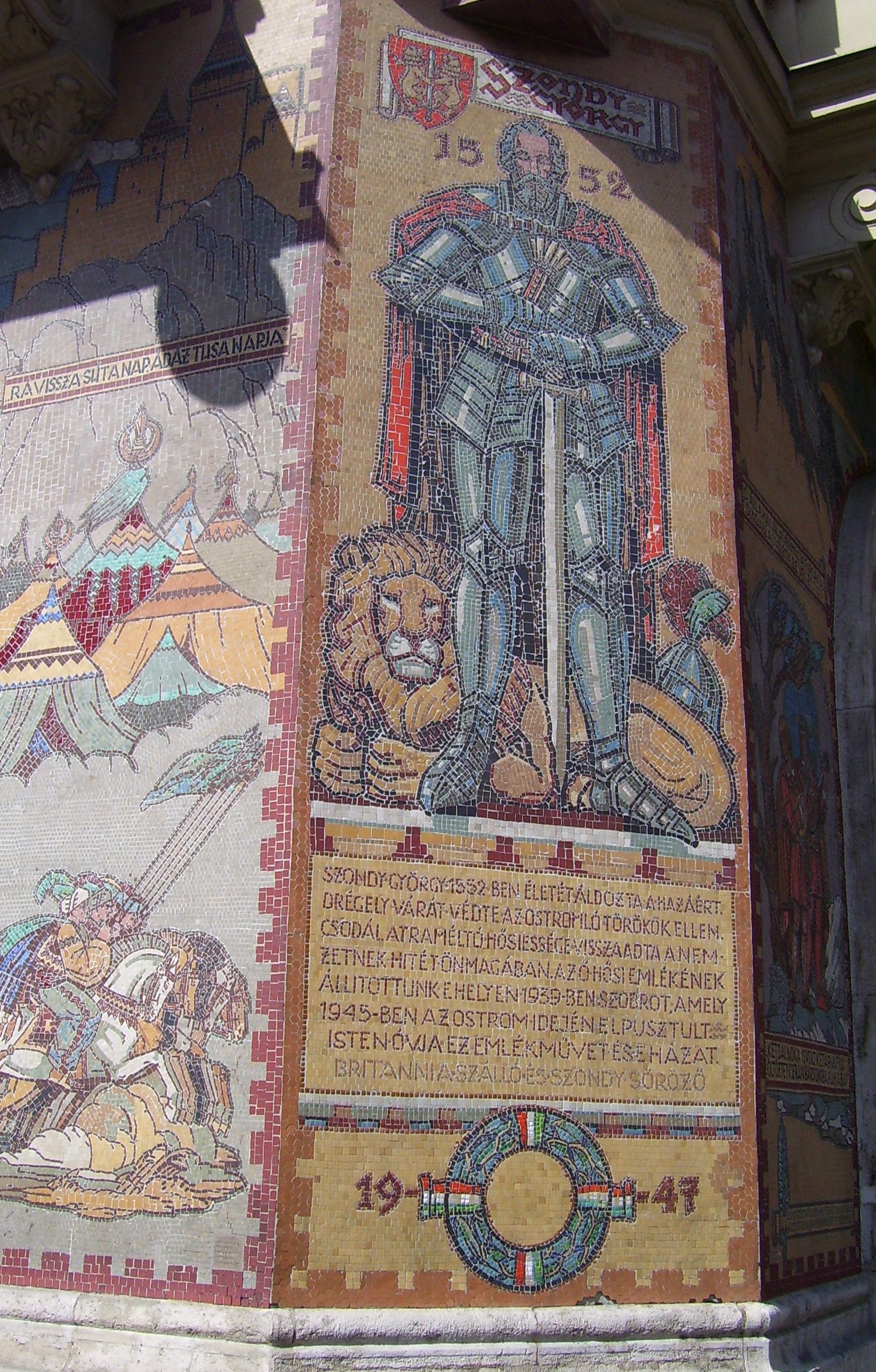
Mosaic of Szondy on the corner of Szondi Street and Teréz Avenue, Budapest

Following the loss of Esztergom and Nógrád, Drégely Castle became part of the first line of border defense against the advancing Ottoman forces. Originally built as a hunting lodge for the archbishops of Esztergom, the small mountain fortress was poorly suited for modern military defense. Following Archbishop Várday's death in 1549, the castle fell under royal administration, leading to chronic shortages in provisions, deteriorating fortifications, and delayed pay for the garrison.

A lightning strike further damaged the powder tower and walls. Szondy repeatedly petitioned the royal court for reinforcements and ammunition, and even proposed demolishing the indefensible Drégely to build a stronger fort in a nearby marshy area, though financial constraints prevented this.

By July 1552, under the imminent threat of an Ottoman invasion, Szondy commanded a tiny garrison of roughly 80 men (16 horsemen, 60 foot soldiers, a gunner, and three guards). Despite urgent appeals to the royal chamber, the Bishop of Nitra (Ferenc Thurzó), and Banská Štiavnica (Selmecbánya), minimal reinforcements arrived. As the danger mounted, his deputy commander, Gergely Bekefalvay, abandoned the post due to unpaid wages and fear of the approaching enemy.

== The Siege and Death ==
In early July 1552, Hadim Ali Pasha, the Beylerbey of Buda, marched on Drégely with an army of 8,000 to 10,000 men and heavy artillery. On July 6, the Ottomans completely surrounded the castle.

Despite being summoned to surrender by Ali Pasha, Szondy resolutely refused. The Ottomans burned the outer wooden-earth fortification, forcing the defenders into the citadel. Over the next two days, heavy bombardment from cannons and mortars decimated the medieval stone walls and towers. Despite massive breaches, Szondy and his men successfully repelled the initial infantry assaults.

Before the final onslaught on July 9, Szondy sent two captive Turks and his two young musical pages to Ali Pasha with a plea: to spare and raise the boys as valiant warriors, and to ensure his own body received an honorable burial. He then destroyed valuable belongings and killed his horses to prevent them from falling into enemy hands, preparing for the inevitable final stand.

During the fierce final assault, Szondy fought valiantly ("like a lion") until he and his entire garrison were killed. Deeply impressed by his extraordinary courage, Hadim Ali Pasha ordered Szondy's body to be recovered, his head displayed temporarily, and then granted him a formal military funeral, planting a horse-tail cavalry lance on his grave as a tribute to his valor.

Historian Ignác Acsády summarized Szondy's unique place in history:

"Our history is full of heroes, patriots, and martyrs who, like him, sacrificed their lives for the nation... But even among the greatest and most outstanding, few evoke such genuine sympathy through the charm of their personality, the magic of masculine character, the crystal purity of their entire lives, and the magnificence of their self-sacrifice as György Szondy."

== Legacy and the "Szondy Cult" ==
György Szondy's heroic sacrifice became a timeless symbol of patriotism, unwavering duty, and self-sacrifice in Hungarian culture. His legacy has inspired numerous literary and artistic masterworks:

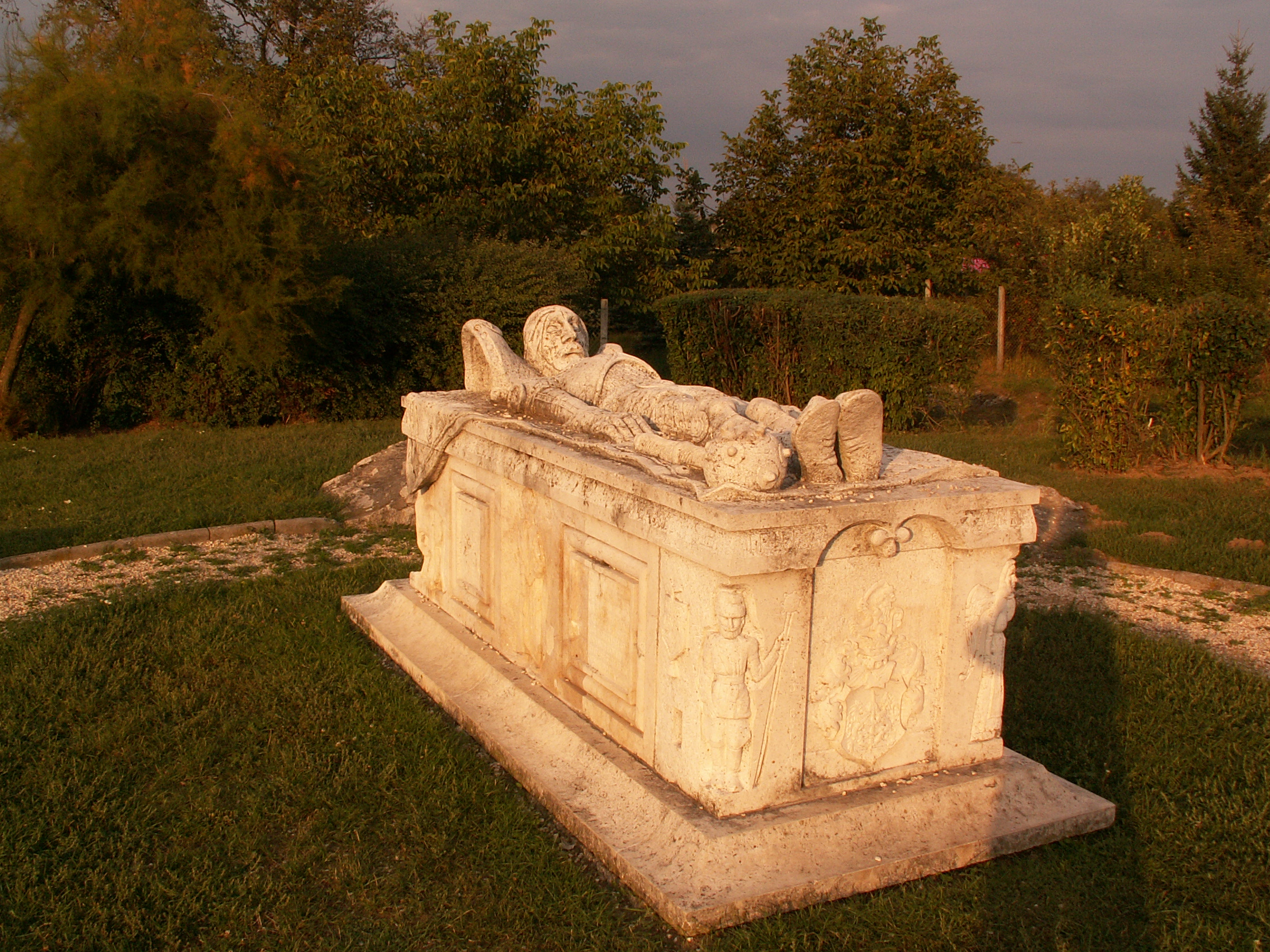
Szondy's sarcophagus in Drégelypalánk

- Sebestyén Tinódi Lantos: Historic chronicle songs commemorating the siege.
- János Arany: The iconic ballad Szondi két apródja ("Szondi's Two Pages").
- Mór Jókai: Historical accounts in Magyar nemzeti vértanúk (Hungarian National Martyrs, 1895).

=== Monuments & Art ===
- László Marton's statue of György Szondy at Kodály Körönd in Budapest.
- Pál Kő's symbolic sarcophagus in Drégelypalánk.
- A memorial plaque at the ruins of Drégely Castle.
