= Simón de Rojas =

Spanish saint (1552–1624)

Saint Simón de Rojas O.SS.T.
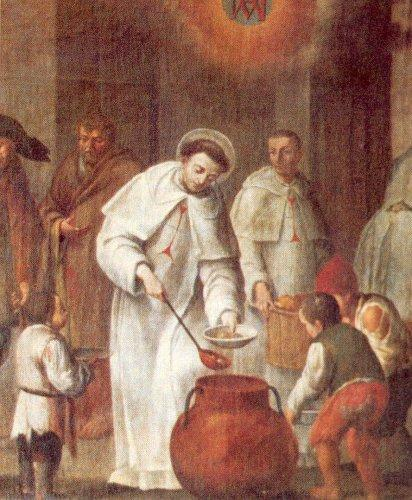
- St. Simón de Rojas feeding the poor

Confessor and Trinitarian
- Born: 28 October 1552; Valladolid, Spain
- Died: 29 September 1624; Madrid, Spain
- Venerated in: Roman Catholic Church
- Beatified: 19 March 1766 by Pope Clement XIII
- Canonized: 3 July 1988, Vatican Basilica by Pope John Paul II
- Feast: 28 September
- Attributes: Priestly vestments with the Blue and Red cross of the Trinitarian Order

Simón de Rojas (28 October 1552 – 29 September 1624) was a Spanish priest of the Trinitarian Order known as the "Apostle of the Ave Maria", for his devotion to the Blessed Virgin Mary. A person of many abilities, Rojas was a theologian and a spiritual writer, as well as a friend and benefactor of the poor.

== Early life ==
Born 28 October 1552, in Valladolid, Spain, he lived a childhood steeped in piety. As a child, Rojas was cured of a serious speech impediment through his devotion to the Blessed Virgin Mary. His very first words were "Ave Maria", almost foreshadowing his lifelong devotion to the Virgin. At the age of twelve, he entered the Trinitarian monastery at Valladolid and there he made his religious profession on 28 October 1572, the day of his 20th birthday. He then went on to study at the University of Salamanca from 1573 to 1579, during which time he was ordained a priest in 1577.

== Religious life ==
Rojas taught philosophy and theology at Toledo from 1581 to 1587. From 1588 until his death he fulfilled the office of superior in various monasteries of his province and was sent as apostolic visitor twice to his own province of Castilla, and once to that of Andalusia. His greatest joy was to visit Marian shrines, to pray to Mary and with Mary, to imitate her virtues, to sing her praises, to acknowledge her importance in the mystery of God and of the Church.

Through profound theological studies, he came to understand even better the mission of Mary in cooperation with the Trinity for the salvation of the human race and the sanctification of the church. He lived his religious vows in the imitation of Mary. He held that, for everyone to be completely of God, as Mary had been, it was necessary to become her slaves, or better, slaves of God in Mary; for this reason he established the Congregation of the Slaves of Mary for the greater glory of the Trinity, in praise of the Virgin, in the service of the poor.

For him, to be a slave of Mary meant belonging totally to her: "Totus tuus" in order to unite oneself more intimately to Christ and in him through the Spirit, to the Father. During this period Rojas began to serve the Spanish queen, Margaret of Austria, as confessor. When in 1611 she fell gravely ill following childbirth, becoming comatose, her husband King Philip III feared that she would be unable to receive the sacraments before dying. Rojas then came to her bedside. After he had greeted her with the words, "Ave Maria, Señora" ("Hail Mary, my lady"), she instantly became conscious and answered him, "Gratia plena, Padre Rojas" ("Full of grace, Father Rojas"). Rojas was thereupon able to administer to her the anointing of the sick and Viaticum before she died.

On 14 April 1612, he founded the Congregation of the Slaves of the Sweet Name of Mary.

In 1619, he was named tutor to the royal princes of Spain and on 12 May 1621 he was elected provincial of Castilla. These two posts were only accepted by Rojas on the condition that he be able to continue his work with the poor, and remaining faithful to the Trinitarian charism. Whilst working in the court Rojas had thousands of images of the Most Holy Virgin printed with the inscription: "Ave Maria", which he also sent abroad. He had rosaries made with seventy-two blue beads on a white cord, symbols of the Assumption and the Immaculate Conception, and also a reminder that Mary, according to the belief of the time, lived to the age of 72 years. He sent these rosaries everywhere, even to England (at that time a Protestant nation). Using his influence at court, he had the angelic greeting so dear to him, "Ave Maria", engraved in letters of gold on the facade of the royal palace in Madrid.

Later, on 1 January 1622, he was chosen confessor of Queen Isabel of Borbon. On 5 June 1622, he petitioned the Holy See for the approval of his liturgical text composed in honour of the Sweet Name of Mary, which later, Pope Innocent XI extended to the Catholic Church. He died in Madrid on 29 September 1624.

== After death ==
After his death on 29 September 1624, the honours bestowed on him at his funeral took on the aspect of an anticipated canonisation. For twelve days, the most renowned preachers of Madrid exalted his virtues and his holiness. Impressed with this unanimous veneration, on 8 October 1624, the papal nuncio ordered the beginning of the process leading to his beatification by the church. His heroic virtues were recognised by Pope Clement XII on 25 March 1735. Rojas was beatified by Pope Clement XIII on 19 March 1766. On 3 July 1988, just before the close of the Marian Year, he was finally canonised by Pope John Paul II.

== Legacy ==
Rojas is often depicted by painters, with the greeting "Ave Maria" on his lips. The congregation founded by Rojas, Congregation of the Slaves of the Sweet Name of Mary (also known as the Congregation of the Slaves of Mary or the Congregation of the Most Holy Name of Mary), was intended for the laity; persons of every social class could join. The members, who included the king and his children, dedicated themselves to honour Mary by giving maternal help to her favourite children, the poor. This work still continues in Spain. Rojas, who is held to be one of the greatest contemplatives of his time and who in his work, "The Greatness of Prayer" is clearly a great instructor of prayerful souls, wanted the contemplative dimension joined to the active through works of mercy.

== Bibliography ==
- Matthew Bunson, Margaret Bunson, Our Sunday Visitor's Encyclopedia of Saints, Our Sunday Visitor Publishing, p757.
