= Drégelypalánk =

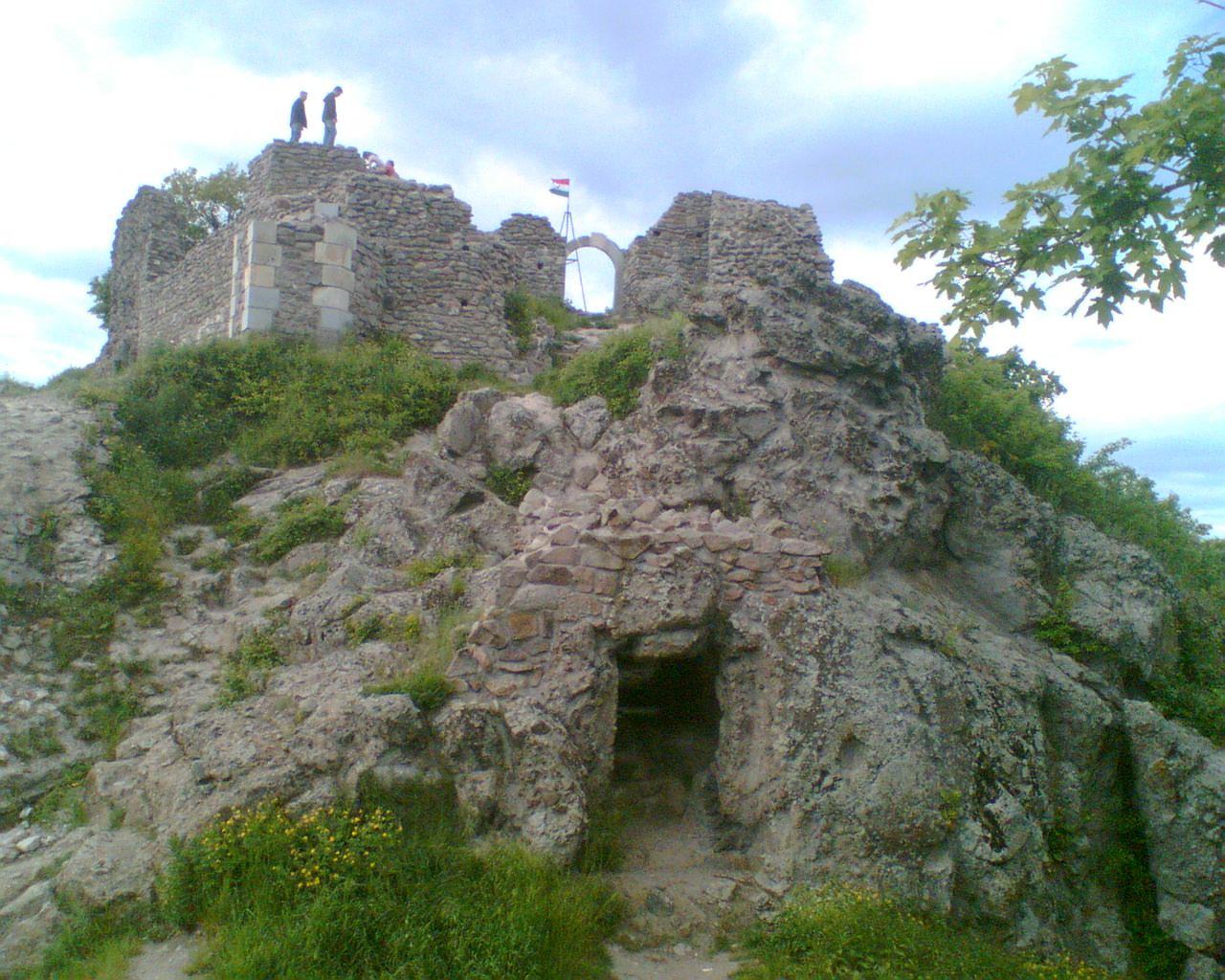
- Castle ruins

- Flag Coat of arms

- Location of Drégelypalánk
- Coordinates: 48.05°N 19.05°E
- Country: Hungary
- County: Nógrád

Area
  - Total: 22.18 km^{2} (8.56 sq mi)
- Elevation: 151 m (495 ft)

Population (2023)
  - Total: 1,378
  - Density: 62.13/km^{2} (160.9/sq mi)
- Time zone: UTC+1 (CET)
  - Summer (DST): UTC+2 (CEST)
- Postal code: 2646

Drégelypalánk is a village in Nógrád County, Hungary. It was first recorded in 1274 and was created as a merger of two settlements named Drégely and Palánk. The river Ipoly flows past the Börzsöny hills here.

The village features a primary school, a cultural centre, a library, a sports ground and a gallery.

== History ==
Drégelypalánk has a medieval fortress that was erected by the Hont-Pázmány dynasty in the 13th century. In 1552 the fortification were defended against the advancing Turkish Army.

Drégely is recorded as the site of a church dedicated to St. Elizabeth. During the Turkish rule, South Slavic settlers came to the area while German immigrants arrived in the 18th century.

The centuries-old economic relations with the neighbouring countries were lost after World War I.

== Sights ==
Sights of Drégelypalánk include the late Baroque (1734) Roman Catholic church with relics of Saint Elizabeth (Hungarian: Árpádházi Szent Erzsébet), the Baroque chapel of St. Vendel (1857) and the ruins of the 13th-century Drégely Castle.
