= Anthony Tyrrell =

Roman Catholic priest and Church of England clergyman

- Born: 1552
- Died: c. 1610
- Occupations: Roman Catholic priest, Church of England clergyman
- Parent: George Tyrrell
- Relatives: Sir Thomas Tyrrell (grandfather)

Anthony Tyrrell (1552 – c. 1610) was an English Roman Catholic renegade priest and spy.

== Origins ==
Anthony Tyrrell, born in 1552, was son of George Tyrrell. His grandfather, Sir Thomas Tyrrell, who married Constance Blount, the daughter of Lord Mountjoy, was great-great-grandson of Sir John Tyrrell. The family was Catholic in Mary's reign and in favour with the Queen. After the accession of Elizabeth, George retired with his wife and children to the Netherlands, where they fell into extreme poverty.

== Ordination ==
Anthony, after graduating BA in some university, and being unable to pursue his studies for want of money, came over to England to beg from his relatives. He was seized as a recusant, but after some months' imprisonment obtained his release through the favour apparently of Lord Burghley, and he again went abroad. He was one of the first students who entered the newly founded college at Rome, and at the age of twenty-seven he took the college oath, 23 April 1579. In less than two years he was ordained priest and sent upon the English mission, where on 29 April 1581 he was captured and thrown into the Gatehouse. He, however, broke prison and was again at large in January 1582. In 1584 he travelled abroad, and revisited Rome in company with the seminary priest John Ballard.

== Political intrigue ==
On his return to England in 1585 Tyrrell became mixed up with the strange practices of Father Weston, SJ, Robert Dibdale, and others, in the alleged casting out of devils in the house of Lord Vaux at Hackney, and at Sir George Peckham's at Denham. (Note: Law, T. G. (March 1894). "Devil Hunting in Elizabethan England", Nineteenth Century, n.p.) Tyrrell, it seems, wrote some account of these prodigies, or at least had a hand in the so-called Book of Miracles attributed to Weston, extracts from which have been preserved by Samuel Harsnett. The chief actors in this affair were arrested or dispersed in the midsummer of 1586; and Tyrrell, described by Father Southwell as "a man that hath done much good", was taken prisoner for the third time and lodged in the counter in Wood Street, 4 July. For a moment he maintained the genuineness of the alleged supernatural phenomena in which he had taken part, and expressed his grief when the knives, rusty nails, and other objects which he declared had been extracted from the cheeks or stomachs of the possessed women and had been found in his trunk, were taken away from him by the pursuivants. He, however, presently opened communication with Burghley; and a few weeks later the arrest of his friend Ballard so alarmed him that, to secure his own safety and gain the favour of the Government, he made at several times (27, 30, 31 August, 2, 3 September) secret disclosures regarding the Babington conspirators, Mary Stuart, the Pope, and a number of his clerical brethren, mixing up with some genuine and valuable information much that was mere guesswork or absolute fiction. Before long he avowed himself to be a sincere convert to Protestantism, and professed a desire to make satisfaction for his former errors by giving information of Popish practices. He was accordingly in September removed to the Clink jail, in order that he might have better scope for acting his chosen part of spy and informer among the many Catholic prisoners there, and shortly afterwards he was granted liberty abroad for the same purpose. Meanwhile, he was encouraged by Justice Young to continue saying Mass and hearing confessions, and Lord Burghley wrote to him: "Your dissimulation is to a good end". When at last the suspicions of the Catholics were aroused, Tyrrell asked permission to profess openly his conversion; and it was resolved that he should receive catechetical instruction and license to preach from the Archbishop of Canterbury.

== Conversions ==
Tyrrell's conscience was meanwhile smitten by the exhortations of a priest who had detected his treacheries, and before encountering the Archbishop he obtained leave of absence for a few weeks on the plea of private business. He at once fled north to Leith, and there took ship to the continent, having previously written a long letter to the Queen, retracting all his former accusations against his brethren and renouncing his Protestantism. (Note: Strype, John (1709). Annals of the Reformation and Establishment of Religion, vol. ii. pt. ii. p. 425) He also wrote a full and detailed confession, which came into the possession of Father Parsons, and was by him being prepared for the press, when Tyrrell, with no apparent reason, after a few months slipped back into England, and there fell or threw himself into the hands of his former masters. This retractation must evidently be received with as much caution as his former charges. The Government, however, now insisted on his making at St. Paul's Cross a public recantation of his late apostasy and a reaffirmation of his original statements. This he was apparently ready to do, but on the appointed day, Sunday, 31 January 1588, on mounting the pulpit in the presence of a large crowd of both Catholics and Protestants, he unexpectedly began a speech in the opposite sense. He was thereupon violently interrupted, rescued with difficulty from the angry mob, hurried to Newgate, and thence to close confinement in the Counter, but not before he had contrived to scatter among the people copies of his intended discourse, which was triumphantly published in the same year by John Bridgewater. Tyrrell again persevered as a penitent Catholic for about six months, being for part of that time fortified in his resolution by a fellow prisoner of the same faith with whom he held daily converse through a chink in the wall of his cell. But he then recurred to the Church of England, professed to Burghley his "true repentance" in October, and at last, on 8 December 1588, successfully delivered at Paul's Cross the sermon which should have been preached in the preceding January. It was printed with the title The recantation and abjuration of Anthony Tyrrell (some time priest of the English College in Rome, but now by the great mercy of God converted and become a true professor of His Word) pronounced by himself at Paul's Cross after the sermon made by Mr. Pownoll, preacher … At London 1588.

Tyrrell now retired into private life as an Anglican clergyman, took a wife, and held the vicarage of Southminster and the parsonage of Dengie. In 1595 he was acting as chaplain to Lady Bindon, but in the autumn of that year he fell into disreputable company, and tried to escape abroad with his new friends under cover of a false passport. The Government were on the watch. He was caught, and underwent in the Marshalsea his sixth imprisonment. Here he remained for at least two months, but was probably soon afterwards released by means of his old patron, Justice Young, who, "moved by the pitiful request and suit of his [Tyrrell's] wife", and finding him "constant in God's true religion and desirous to continue his preaching", interceded on his behalf with Sir Robert Cecil. In 1602 Tyrrell, together with several other witnesses, appeared before the Bishop of London and the royal commissioners to give evidence regarding the exorcisms of 1585, which he did in the form of a written statement, more sober in style than most of his previous declarations. This Confession of M.A. Anthonie Tyrrell, Clerke, written with his owne hand and avouched upon his oath the 15 of June 1602, was printed in the following year, together with The copies of the severall examinations and confessions of the parties pretending to be possessed and dispossessed by Weston the jesuit and his adherents, in the Declaration of Egregious Popish Impostures, published by Harsnett, then chaplain to the Bishop of London, and afterwards Archbishop of York. Tyrrell here remarks that the charges of treason which he had brought against Babington and afterwards retracted were in the event not only fully justified, "but a great more than ever I knew or dreamed of".

== Death ==
Tyrrell passed through one more change. Father Weston, who died in 1615, relates in his Autobiography that in his old age Tyrrell was persuaded by his brother to retire into Belgium, where he died reconciled to the Roman Church. (Note: Morris, John (1872). The Troubles of our Catholic Forefathers, 3rd ser. p. 207) The exact date is not known.

== Sources ==
- Holmes, Peter (2004). "Tyrrell, Anthony (1552–1615), Roman Catholic priest and Church of England clergyman ". In Oxford Dictionary of National Biography. Oxford University Press.
- Law, Thomas Graves (1899). "Tyrrell, Anthony" . In Lee, Sidney (ed.). Dictionary of National Biography. Vol. 57. London: Smith, Elder & Co. pp. 437–439.
