= Drégely Castle =

Hungarian castle

- Drégely Vára
- Part of Hungarian border castle system
- near Drégelypalánk, Nógrád County, Hungary
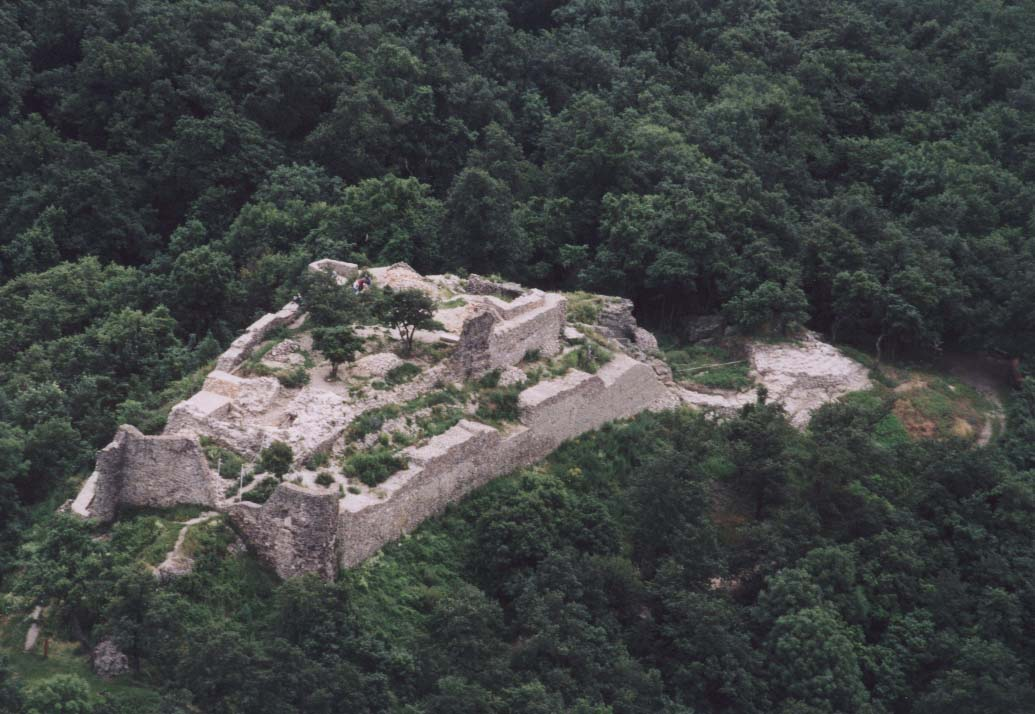
- Aerial photo of the castle ruins from the northwest

Site information
- Type: Castle
- Owner: Drégely Foundation
- Open to the public: Yes
- Condition: Ruined

Location
- Location of Drégely Castle in Hungary
- Coordinates: 48.016783°N 19.033544°E

Site history
- Built: late 13th Century
- Built by: probably Hunt-Poznon family
- In use: until 1575 (as watchpost)
- Materials: Stone
- Demolished: 1552
- Battles/wars: 1552 – Razed by Ali Pasha
- Events: 1990 – Restoration started

Drégely Castle (Hungarian: Drégely vára) is a 13th-century hilltop castle in Nógrád County, Hungary. It is in ruins, but being restored.

== Geography ==
The ruins of Drégely Castle sit on a 440-metre-high (1,440 ft) peak of the Börzsöny mountains in Hungary. The area is in the administrative territory of Drégelypalánk in Nógrád County. But it is easier to reach the castle from Nagyoroszi on surfaced road. The castle district is in the area of the Danube-Ipoly National Park.

== History ==
The small castle was probably built by the Bozók branch of the Hunt-Poznan family in the second half of the 13th century, during the Árpád dynasty, by order of Béla IV. It was first mentioned as Latin: Castrum Dragul in a charter of 1285 as the possession of Demeter of the Hunt-Poznan family. The proprietors had to surrender to Máté Csák III in 1311. After the death of this oligarch in 1321 the castle was overcome by the army of Charles I of Hungary. At that time Drégely Castle served as the county dungeon and held the archives of Hont County.

In 1390 King Sigismund exchanged the castle with the Tary family for lands in Somogy county. Later the King reacquired Drégely because of the despotic measures of the Tary family and their castellan.

In 1438 Drégely was gained by the Archbishop of Esztergom. The high priest rebuilt the castle to be his hunting seat.

Drégely came under military control again after the fall of Buda in 1541. It became part of the border castle system designed to repel invaders of the Ottoman Empire. Archbishop Pál Várday spent much money to strengthen the castle. In 1543 Esztergom, the centre of the archdiocese, fell. Next year the castles of Vác and Nógrád fell too. Drégely became part of the first line of defence for the kingdom. In 1544 Várday appointed György Szondy to be castellan of the castle and the governor of the Drégely estate. Szondy tried to fortify the small fortress against Turkish invaders. Várday died in 1549, and the local guards were no longer paid regularly. In the same year lightning struck the castle, but it hardly damaged the walls or the gunpowder depot.

In 1552 Hadim Ali Pasha of Buda laid siege to the castle at Veszprém and captured it on 2 June. The Turkish army turned its attention to the castles of Hont and Nógrád counties. The army of Ali Pasha – about 10,000 to 12,000 strong – got below Drégely Castle on the morning of 6 July. The defenders of the castle consisted of 120 men hired by King Ferdinand and 26 warriors sent by the royal mining town of Banská Štiavnica (then Schemnitz or Selmec). Ali Pasha immediately called upon Szondy to surrender. After the Hungarian refusal Ali the castle's outer wooden wall be set on fire. Because of the first combat the defenders withdrew into the inner stone castle. At the following dawn, Turkish engineering corps built a counterfort on a place called Várbérc ("Castle Crag") where Turkish artillery started a cannonade against the castle gate using three cannon and six howitzers. The cannon fire continued for two days.

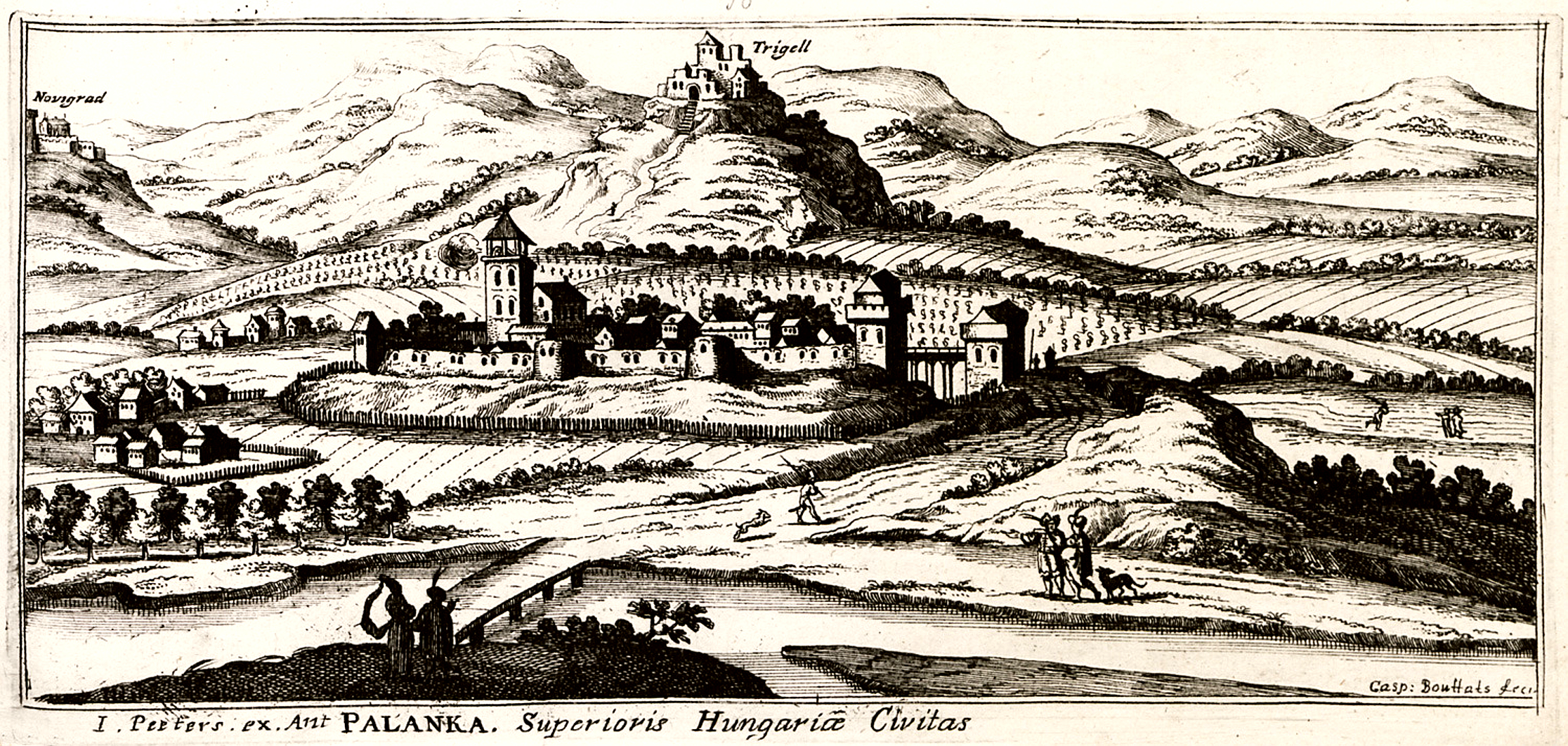
Drégely Castle – Trigell above, and Palánk below, in a medieval copper engraving

On 9 July 1552 the high castle gate and its tower collapsed. That was when Ali Pasha sent the priest Márton as envoy to persuade Szondy to surrender. Szondy refused again, but he sent his two pageboys accompanied by two noble Turkish captives to Ali. They brought the message that the castle would be defended until the last breath. Szondy asked Ali to educate the two boys in exchange for the release of the two Turkish prisoners, and for himself to be buried with full honours. As reply to Szondy's repeated refusal Turkish troops started a decisive attack on the castle. Szondy was shot in his knee and the subsequent bullet killed him. The defenders were killed until the last man. Drégely fell, but Ali paid tribute to the brave dead castellan.

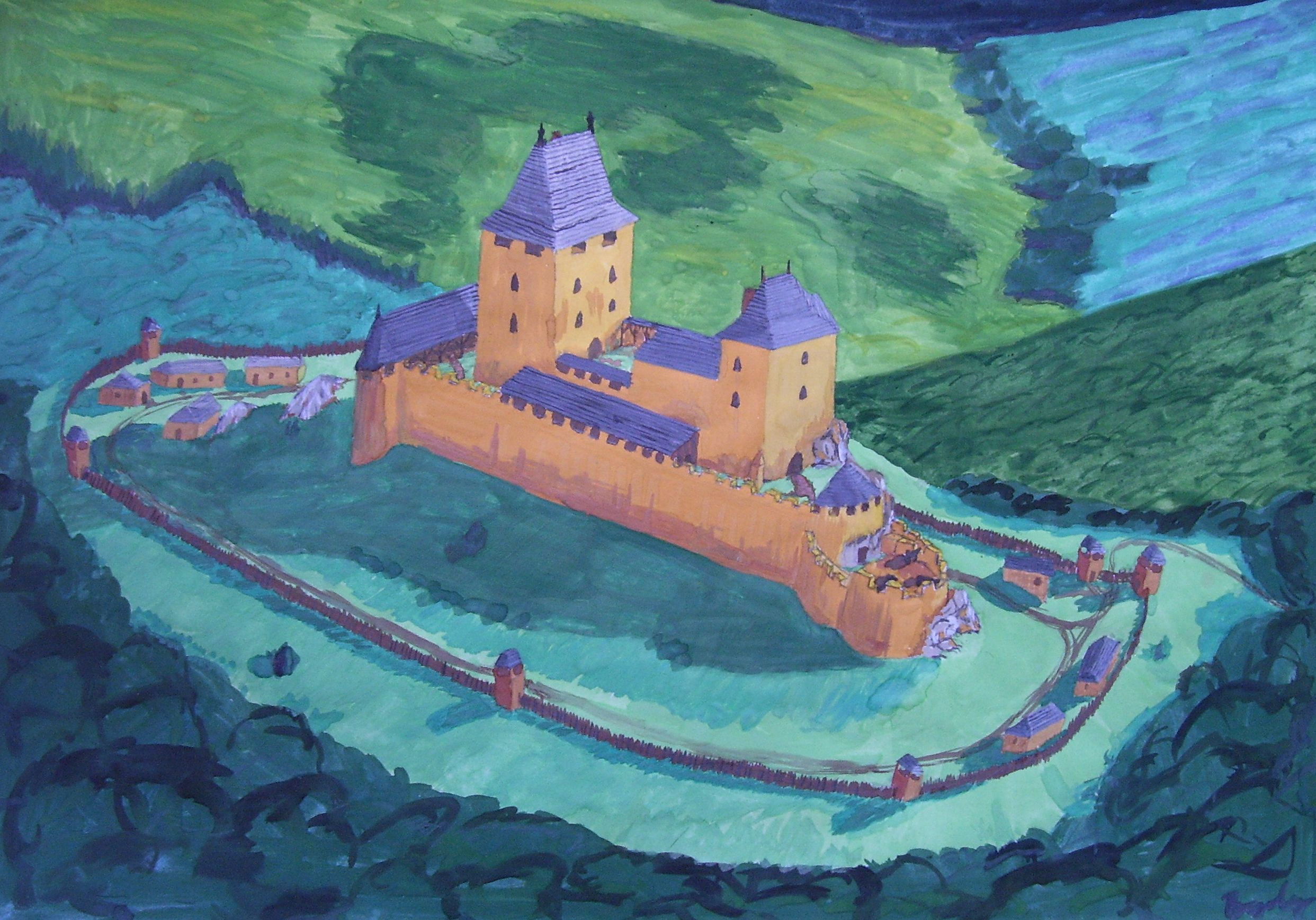
Drégely Castle in the 16th century

During the siege of Drégely the royal army of about 8,000 camped at Levice (then Hungarian: Léva), but the commander of the army, Erasmus Teuffel, did not take any action to help the besieged castle. The fall of Drégely started a chain of defeats of castles of Hont and Nógrád counties. Ottoman troops conquered nine-tenths of the castles in the two counties in short order, because most of the defenders of the neighbouring castles deserted. At the end of the July there was an enormous gap in the Hungarian border castle system. The royal army belatedly tried to stop the Turkish troops at Plášťovce (then Palást) but in a two-days battle they were utterly routed, and 4,000 German and Italian warriors were deported to Istanbul.

The completely ruined stone castle of Drégely was not renewed. Turkish troops used its remnants as a watch-post for a while, then in 1575 built a new earth fortress in near village of Palánk. The castle hill returned to forest. The building lines of the former castle were disappearing.

== Today ==
The ruins of the castle were saved by enthusiasts, in particular the forester Károly Teszári. The sponsor of the project is the Drégelyvár Fund, which was established in 1991. Until 2008 1,083 cubic metres (38,200 cu ft) of walls were pulled up.

== How to get there ==
The Hungarian State Railways (MÁV) Line 75 (Vác–Diósjenő–Drégelypalánk–Balassagyarmat) stops at Drégelyvár, between Nagyoroszi and Drégelypalánk. Running in the Börzsöny valley, This is one of the most scenic railway lines in Hungary.

== Sources ==
- Végh, József (2009), Szondy György és Drégely vára emlékezete ("Memoirs: György Szondy and Drégely Castle") (in Hungarian), Gödöllői Innovációs Központ (Gödöllő Innovation Centre)
