= Joannes (name) =

Joannes can be a mononym, masculine given name, a middle name, or a surname. Notable people with the name include:

== Mononym ==
- Joannes, Western Roman emperor from 423 to 425
- Joannes of S. Cecilia, 12th-century Roman Catholic cardinal

== Given name ==
- Joannes Actuarius, 13th and 14th-century Byzantine physician
- Joannes Alegado, Filipino politician
- Joannes Olaus Alnander
- Joannes Barbucallus, 5th century Greek poet
- Joannes Bassianus
- Joannes Bochius
- Joannes van der Brugghen, Flemish painter, engraver, art dealer and publisher
- Joannes Bunderius
- Joannes Burmeister (1576–1638), German neo-Latin poet laureate
- Joannes Busaeus
- Joannes Mattaeus Caryophyllis, Greek Catholic bishop
- Joannes Charles Melchior Chatin (1847–1912), French botanist and zoologist
- Joannes Cnobbaert (1590–1637), Flemish printer and publisher
- Joannes Baptista Colloredo (1617 – after 1646), one of a pair of Italian conjoined twins
- Joannes de Cordua, Flemish painter
- Joannes Corvus, Flemish portrait painter
- Joannes Cuppari, Croatian Roman Catholic prelate
- Joannes David
- Joannes van Doetecum the Elder, Dutch engraver
- Joannes Baptista Dolar
- Joannes Adamus Gaiger
- Joannes Gennadius (1844–1932), Greek diplomat and bibliophile
- Joannes Gijsen (1932–2013), Dutch Roman Catholic bishop
- Joannes van Gouda
- Joannes Grapheus (1502–1571), Printer based in Antwerp
- Joannes Disma Floriantschitsch de Grienfeld
- Joannes Hauchin
- Joannes Hermans, Flemish still life and animal painter
- Joannes van Heymissem
- Joannes van Houbraken, Flemish painter and art dealer
- Joannes Florentius a Kempis, Flemish composer and musician
- Joannes Klas
- Joannes de Laet (1581–1649), Dutch geographer
- Joannes Antonides van der Linden
- Joannes Masius
- Joannes Maxentius
- Joannes Sturmius Mechlinianus (1559–1650), Belgian mathematician, physician and poet
- Joannes Meyssens (1612–1670), Flemish painter
- Joannes Miraeus, Fourth bishop of Antwerp
- Joannes de Mol, Dutch minister, Patriot and porcelain manufacturer
- Joannes Molanus
- Joannes Josephus van Mulken, Dutch politician
- Joannes Nevius
- Joannes Cassianus Pompe (1901–1945), Dutch pathologist
- Joannes del Rio
- Joannes Roucourt, Christian theologian and parish priest
- Joannes Rualdus, 17th century French scholar
- Joannes Seyve, French biochemist
- Joannes Jacobus Smith, Dutch botanist
- Joannes Philippus Spalthoven
- Joannes Baptista Sproll
- Joannes Susenbrotus
- Joannes Chrysostomus Teniers, 17th-century Catholic abbot and poet
- Joannes Uri, Hungarian orientalist
- Joannes Aurifaber Vimariensis, German churchman, theologian, and a Protestant reformer
- Joannes Aurifaber Vratislaviensis, German Lutheran theologian and Protestant reformer
- Joannes Woverius, Royal office-holder in the Spanish Netherlands
- Joannes Zacheus, 16th-century Franco-Flemish composer
- Joannes Zonaras, 12th century Byzantine chronicler and theologian

== Middle name ==
- Thomas Joannes Stieltjes (1856–1894), Dutch mathematician

== Surname ==
- Lee Joannes, American football executive

== See also ==
- Joannès, masculine given name and surname
- Johannes, masculine given name and surname
