= 1549 in literature =

This article contains information about the literary events and publications of 1549.

== Events ==
- June 9 – The Booke of the Common Prayer is introduced in churches in England as required by the Act of Uniformity of January 15. It results in a Prayer Book Rebellion breaking out in the West Country.
- Sir Donald Monro, Dean of the Isles, produces the original manuscript of the Description of the Western Isles of Scotland (not published until 1582).
- unknown date – The content of the Guildhall Library in the City of London is acquired by Edward Seymour, 1st Duke of Somerset, Lord Protector of England, for his personal use.

== New books ==
=== Prose ===
- Andrea Alciato - Opera omnia (final volume)
- Joachim du Bellay – La Deffense et illustration de la langue françoyse
- Joannes Bunderius – Compendium concertationis hujus saeculi sapientium et theologorum
- Robert Wedderburn (probable) – The Complaynt of Scotland

=== Drama ===
- Johannes Aal – Johannes der Täufer (John the Baptist)
- Lodovico Dolce
  - Fabritia
  - Giocasta (translation and adaptation of Euripides' The Phoenician Women)

=== Poetry ===
- See 1549 in poetry

== Births ==
- March 11 – Hendrik Laurenszoon Spiegel, Dutch philosopher and grammarian (died 1612)
- December 24 – Kaspar Ulenberg, theologian and Bible translator (died 1617)
- unknown dates
  - Pietro Alagona, Italian theologian (died 1624)
  - Nikola Vitov Gučetić, Croatian statesman, philosopher and science writer (died 1610)
  - Antonio de Herrera y Tordesillas, Spanish historian (died 1626)
  - Thomas Stephens, Jesuit writer and linguist (died 1619)

== Deaths ==
- January 23 – Johannes Honter, Romanian humanist theologian (born 1498)
- January 28 – Elia Levita, Hebrew grammarian, scholar and poet (born 1469)
- March 25 – Veit Dietrich, German theologian (born 1506)
- April – Andrew Boorde, traveller, physician and writer (born 1490)
- August – Jacob Ziegler, humanist and theologian (born c.1470)
- November 25 – Jean de Gagny, French theologian
- December 21 – Marguerite de Navarre, French princess, poet, playwright and short story writer (born 1492)
- unknown date – Daniel Bomberg, Flemish printer (born c.1483)
- probable – Leonard Cox, humanist scholar and rhetorician (born c. 1495)
