= Joannes (disambiguation) =

Joannes was the Western Roman Emperor from 423 to 425.

Joannes may also refer to:

== People ==
- George, Count Joannes (1810–1879), English-American actor
- Joannes (name), mononym, masculine given name, middle name, and surname
  - Joannes of S. Cecilia (fl. 12th century), Roman Catholic cardinal
- Jóannes, Faroese masculine given name
- Joannès, masculine given name and surname

== Other uses ==
- Joannes Brothers Company, former American wholesale and retail company
- Joannes Stadium, stadium in Green Bay, Wisconsin, U.S.

== See also ==
- JoAnn Fabrics, former American arts and fabrics retail chain
- Johannes, masculine given name and surname
