= Nevius =

Nevius is a surname, and may refer to:

- Anna Nevius, American statistician
- C. W. Nevius (21st century), American sportswriter
- Clarissa Nevius (died 1962), American politician
- Craig J. Nevius (21st century), American playwright
- Henry M. Nevius (1841–1911), American soldier, politician and jurist
- Joannes Nevius (circa 1627–1672), American politician
- John Livingstone Nevius (1829-1893), American Protestant missionary in China
- John Nevius (died 1993), American lawyer
- Reuben Nevius (1827-1913), American botanist and Episcopal priest
