= Stična Mansion =

Mansion in Ljubljana, Slovenia

Coordinates: 46°2′48.38″N 14°30′23.33″E

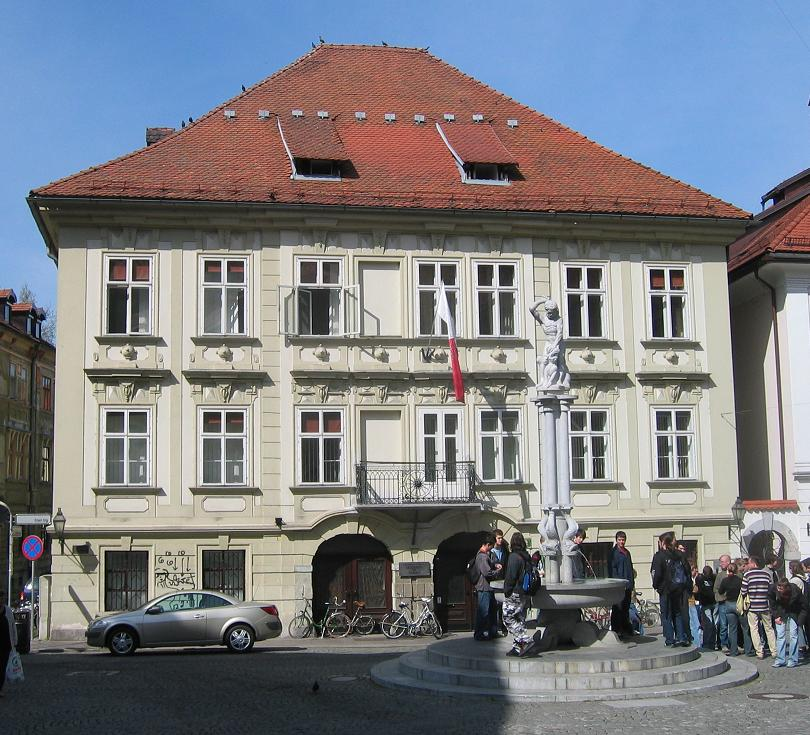
Stična Mansion at Old Square in Ljubljana

Stična Mansion (Slovene: Stiški dvorec, German: Sitticherhof) is a mansion house located at 34 Old Square (Stari trg) in Ljubljana, the capital of Slovenia. The mansion was built between 1628 and 1630, with the purpose of accommodating the abbots of the Cistercian monastery in the village of Stična. Since then, it has undergone several alterations, notably the façade was reworked in the early 18th century. In front of Stična Mansion stands the Hercules Fountain.
