= Cordua =

Cordua is a surname. Notable people with the surname include:

- Carla Cordua, Chilean philosopher
- Joannes de Cordua, Flemish painter
- Julie Cordua

== See also ==
- Michael Cordúa, Nicaraguan-American restauranteur
