= Vir pri Stični =

Vir pri Stični Vir (until 1953)
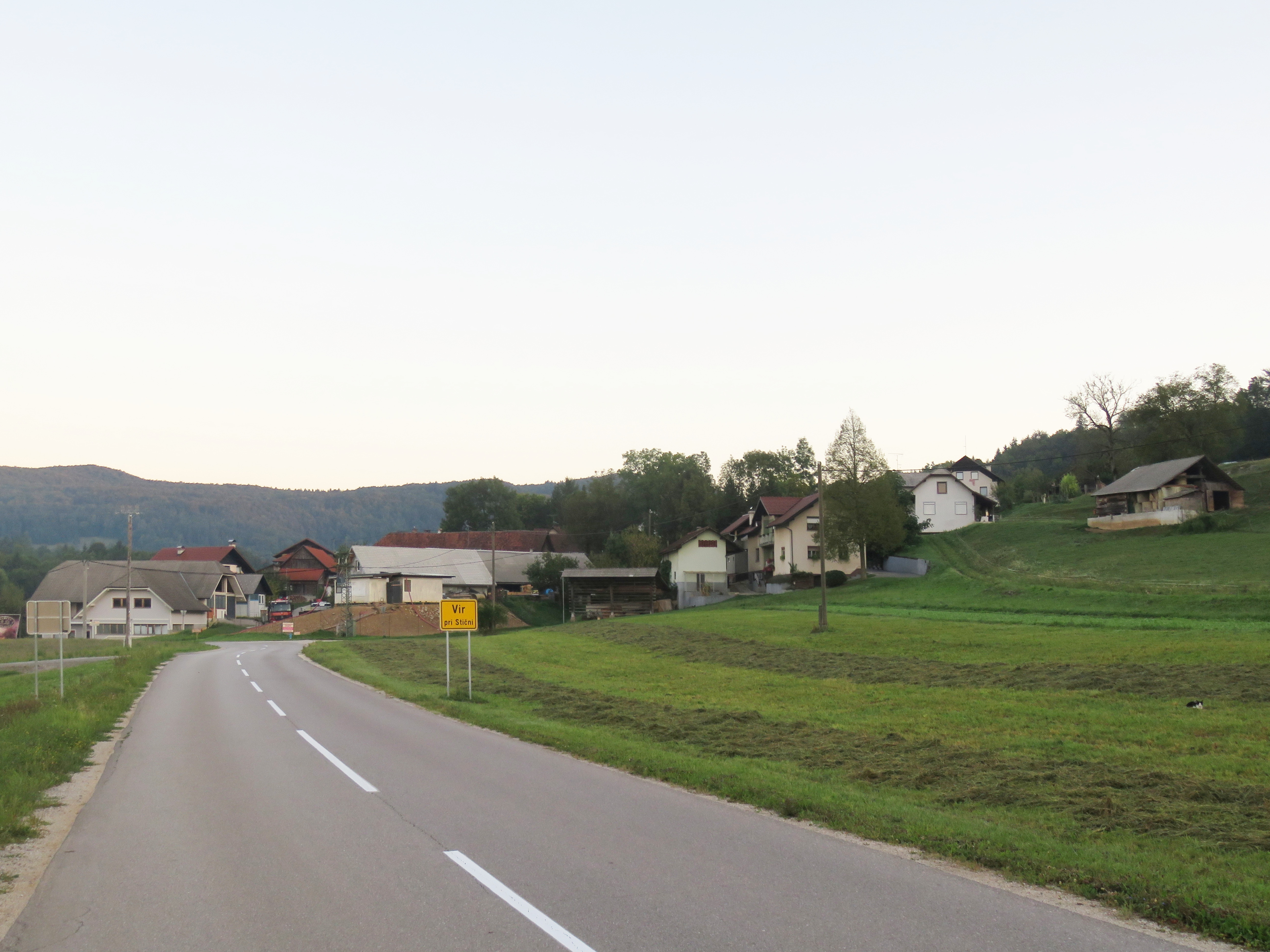

- Location in Slovenia
- Coordinates: 45°56′50.63″N 14°49′5.24″E
- Country: Slovenia
- Traditional region: Lower Carniola
- Statistical region: Central Slovenia
- Municipality: Ivančna Gorica

Area
  - Total: 1.14 km^{2} (0.44 sq mi)
- Elevation: 330.2 m (1,083 ft)

Population (2002)
  - Total: 383

Vir pri Stični (pronounced [ˈʋiːɾ pɾi ˈstiːtʃni]) is a settlement in the Municipality of Ivančna Gorica in central Slovenia. It lies southeast of Stična in the historical region of Lower Carniola. The municipality is now included in the Central Slovenia Statistical Region.

== Name ==
The name of the settlement was changed from Vir to Vir pri Stični in 1953.

== Cultural heritage ==
A Late Bronze Age to Early Iron Age hill fort with its associated burial ground of over 130 burial mounds has been identified near the settlement.
