= Joannès =

Joannès can be a masculine given name or a surname. Notable people with the name include:

- Joannès Barbier, French photographer
- Joannès Marietton, French politician
- Joannès Rivière, French chef
- Gisèle Joannès (1918–1992), French trade unionist, communist, and member of the French Resistance

== See also ==
- Joannes
- Johannes
