= Lado Ambrožič =

Slovenian journalist and editor (born 1948)

Lado Ambrožič (born 1948) is a Slovenian journalist and news editor. In the 1990s, he made a significant contribution to the establishment of the Radiotelevizija Slovenija news broadcasting.

== Early life and education ==
Ambrožič was born on 1 March 1948 in Ljubljana to father Ladislav Ambrožič and mother Kristina Ambrožič née Pušl. Until the completion of the high school in 1968, he lived and attended school in Stična, and then studied in Ljubljana at the Faculty of Sociology, Political Sciences and Journalism (FSPN) until 1973 when he graduated. He supplemented his formal education with a master's degree from the Department of History at the Faculty of Arts in Ljubljana (2005) with a thesis entitled Politični profil Edvarda Kocbeka (The Political Profile of Edvard Kocbek). In the same year, he published his master's thesis in a collection of writings about Edvard Kocbek entitled Globoko zgoraj (Deep Above).

== Career ==
In 1974, he became employed at Radio Ljubljana where he was a journalist and editor in the political department. Initially, he edited the program Še pomnite, tovariši (Do you still remember, comrades?) and was then active as a reporter and commentator in the fields of ecology, banking, and energy industry. He hosted the main news program Dogodki in odmevi (Events and Echos), the program Studio ob sedemnajstih (Studio at Five), and prepared a series of reports and profiles. In 1984, he became employee of TV Ljubljana (TV Slovenia), where he worked as a reporter and commentator in the fields of energy industry and banking, mostly for TV Dnevnik (TV Daily), and hosted Omizje, Aktualno, V znamenju (predecessor to Odmevi) and Utrip. In 1990, he was appointed editor of the domestic politics editorial office, and in 1991, he became editor-in-chief of TV Slovenia's news program, a position he held until the end of 1999. During this time, he created the most successful news program on TV Slovenia, Odmevi (1997). Between 1991 and 2013, he conducted more than 250 one-hour talk shows entitled Intervju (Interview). He is the author of a documentary series about the ten-day war for Slovenia entitled Slovenija na barikadah (Slovenia on the Barricades; 1991) and a documentary series marking the 70th anniversary of the Liberation Front – Od Večne poti do Tivolija (From Večna Pot to Tivoli; 2011).

From 2013 to 2017, he was the ombudsman for viewers and listeners of Radiotelevizija Slovenija.

== Awards ==
Ambrožič is the recipient of the Tone Tomšič Fund Award for journalistic achievements (1982), the Slovenian Nation Uprising Award for the program Še pomnite, tovariši, the Ščuka Prize for journalistic courage from a "group of Slovenian intellectuals" chaired by Drago Ahačič (1989), the Tone Tomšič Group Award for the Slovenian independence project (1991), Jurčič Award for journalistic achievements and editorial work (1995), Radiotelevision Slovenia Award for lifetime achievement (2010), and the Viktor Award for lifetime achievement (2017).
