= Pietro Alagona =

Catholic theologian

Pietro Alagona (1549 – 19 October 1624) was a Catholic theologian.

== Biography ==
Alagona was born in Syracuse. He entered the Society of Jesus in 1564, taught philosophy and theology, and was Rector of Trapani. He died in Rome.

== Works ==
His first works were published under the family name of his mother, Givarra. Later on he used his own name, Alagona, and is best known for his Compendium of the works of Martin Aspilcueta, who was a doctor of theology in Navarre. This Martin Aspilcueta was the uncle of St. Francis Xavier. The Enchiridion, seu Manuale Confessariorum, which was compiled by Alagona, went through at least twenty-three editions. A translation of it into French, by Legard, was condemned by the Parliament of Rouen, 12 February 1762. He also published a compendium of the "Summa", which ran through twenty-five editions, and a compendium of the whole of Canon Law in two volumes, quarto. In the Jesuit College of Palermo there is also found a treatise by Alagona on Logic and Physics.
