= Joannes Philippus Spalthoven =

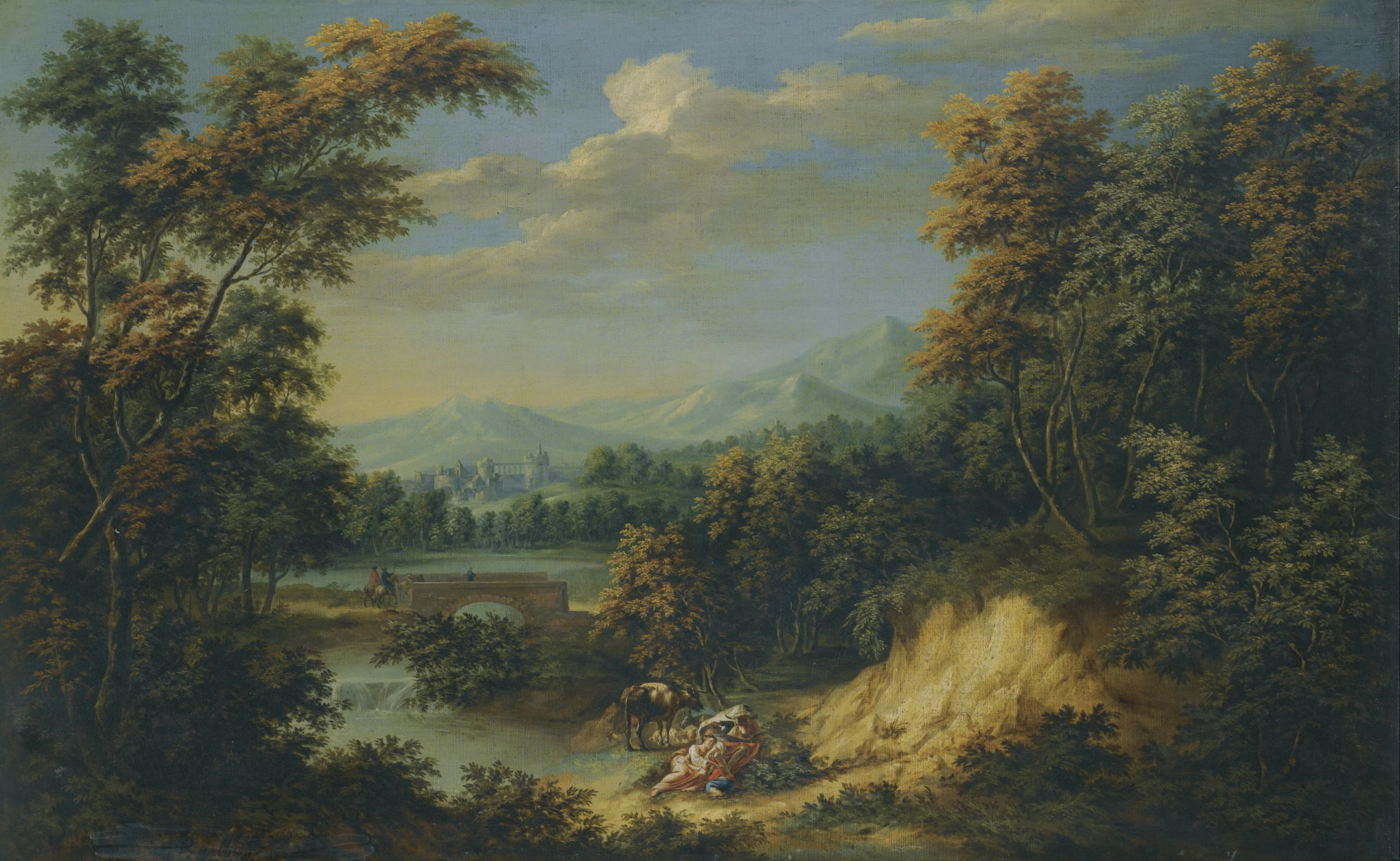
Extensive wooded river landscape with figures

Joannes Philippus Spalthoven, Spalthof or Spalthoff, first name also given as Jan Philip' (c. 1680, Antwerp – c. 1722, Antwerp), was a Flemish landscape painter known for his italianate landscapes with figures, market scenes and ruins.

== Life ==
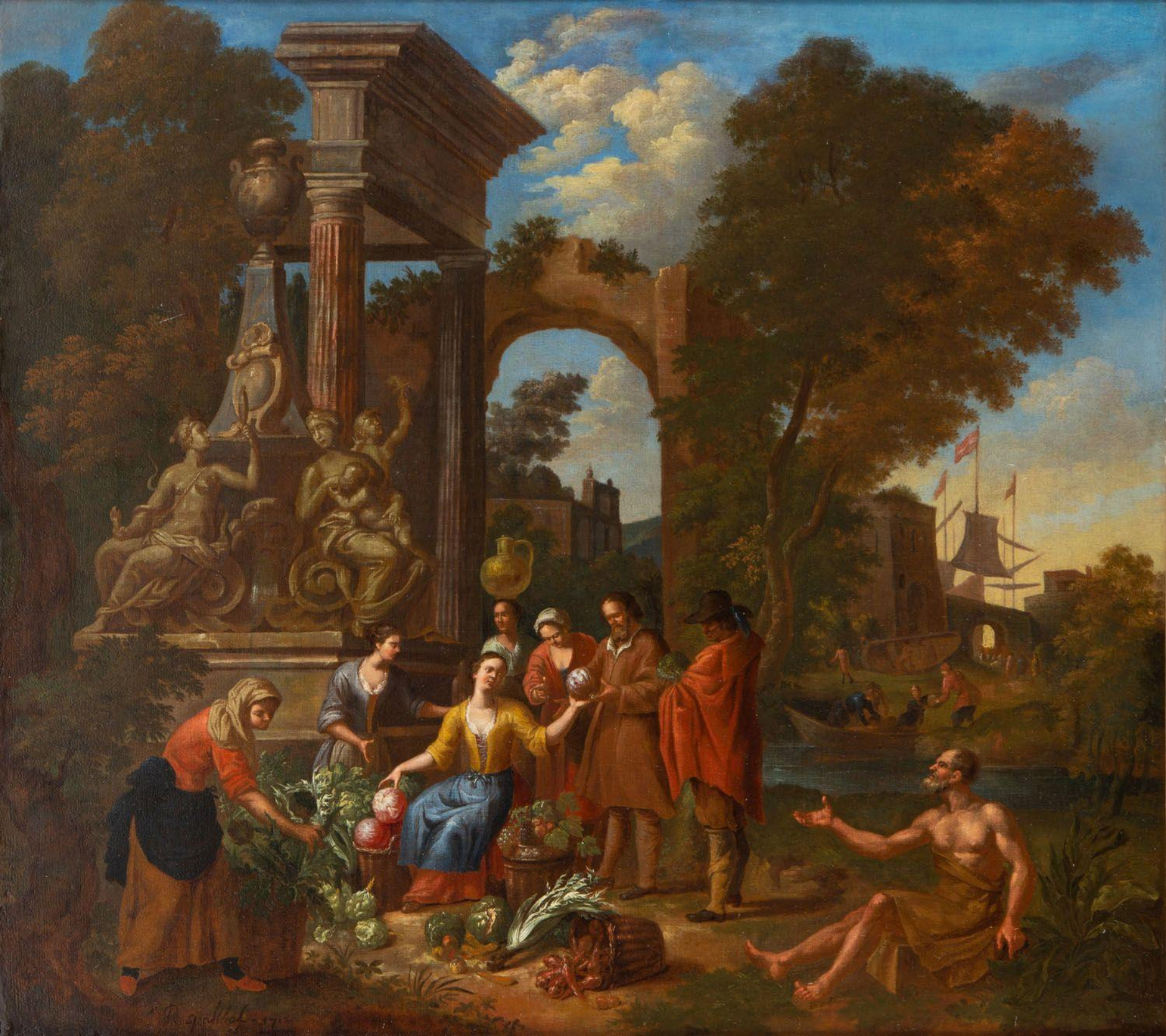
Capriccio with market scene

Details about the life of Spalthoven are scarce. In the guild year 1700–1701, he was registered as a master painter at the Antwerp Guild of Saint Luke. His name in the register was spelled 'Joan Philupus Spalthoven' and 'Joannes Philippus Spalthoven'. It is not recorded with which master he learned his art.

The Dutch artist biographer Arnold Houbraken reported that Spalthoven travelled to Rome by foot three times.

== Work ==
Houbraken stated that Spalthoven specialized in historical allegories with animals as well as scenes of Italianate vegetable markets. The paintings attributed to the artist currently do not include examples of paintings in the former genre. Dated works have been established until 1722. He signed his works with 'J. P. spalthoff'.
