= Gisèle Joannès =

French trade unionist, communist, and member of the French Resistance (1918–1992)

- Joannès in 1952

Member of the Central Committee of the Communist Party of France
- In office 1956–1967

Personal details
- Born: Golda-Raka Nussbaum; 28 July 1918 Warsaw, Poland
- Died: 6 September 1992 (aged 74) Paris, France
- Party: Communist Party of France (PCF)
- Spouse: Victor Joannès (m. 1939; died 1972)
- Children: 4
- Occupation: Seamstress

Gisèle Joannès (born Golda-Raka Nussbaum; 28 July 1918 – 6 September 1992) was a French trade unionist and communist who operated underground as part of the French Resistance during World War II. After the war, she founded two newspapers for women workers. She also served as secretary general of the Clothing Federation and was a member of the Central Committee of the Communist Party of France.

== Early life ==
Born in Poland, Joannès's family immigrated to Paris in 1921 when she was around three years old. Her family were nonpracticing Jews, and she was an atheist like her father. When she was 17, she joined the French Communist Youth organization. (Note: Also called l'Union des jeunes filles (transl. Young Women's Union)) She sewed clothes at a "couture" workshop and described herself as "a card-carrying member of the CGT syndicate". In November 1938, she was fired for going on strike.

== Resistance against Nazi occupation ==
In April 1939, Joannès married Victor Joannès, the National Secretary of the French Communist Youth organization. In September, after the start of the Second World War, her husband had to go into hiding; the following month, Joannès joined him after the police tried to arrest her at her home. When the Nazis occupied France, she dedicated herself to the French Resistance.

While operating underground for the resistance, Joannès adopted different pseudonyms, including "Pierrette" and "Rolande". She also secretly wrote L'Avant-garde, an underground communist newspaper. She would type editions of the paper "with two fingers" and turn up the volume of the radio in her apartment "as loud as possible" to mask the noise of the typewriter. She also frequently traveled to the countryside, smuggling "false cards—ration cards, identity cards, and blank marriage certificates". She rode her bicycle and took commuter trains to avoid suspicion.

Joannès described how she had a close call in 1942 when an "Economic Officer" (Note: These officers "prosecuted black marketers".) stopped her and tried to inspect the parcel she carried on her bicycle. The parcel contained food and false documents, which she had covered with baby clothes. When the officer reached to look under the clothes, she started to cry and pleaded with him to leave the items alone, because she needed everything for her baby and her imprisoned husband. All of this was a lie, but the officer believed it.

== Trade unionism and politics ==
After the war, Joannès joined the Women's Commission of the General Confederation of Labour (CGT). She launched two newspapers for women workers in the 1950s: the Revue Des Travailleuses (transl. Women Workers Review) in 1952 and Antoinette (magazine) in 1955. She also served as secretary general of the Clothing Federation from 1952 to 1976. Her advocacy was focused on empowering women in the workforce.

Joannès was a member of the Communist Party of France and served on the Central Committee of the party from 1956 to 1967.
