= Stična =

- Panorama of Stična

- Location in Slovenia
- Coordinates: 45°57′24.89″N 14°48′19.15″E
- Country: Slovenia
- Traditional region: Lower Carniola
- Statistical region: Central Slovenia
- Municipality: Ivančna Gorica

Area
  - Total: 6.06 km^{2} (2.34 sq mi)
- Elevation: 355.4 m (1,166 ft)

Population (2002)
  - Total: 712

Stična (pronounced [ˈstiːtʃna]; in older sources also Zatičina, German: Sittich) is a village in the Municipality of Ivančna Gorica in central Slovenia. The area is part of the historical region of Lower Carniola. The municipality is now included in the Central Slovenia Statistical Region. It lies just north of Ivančna Gorica and is best known for its Cistercian Abbey. The abbey dates to the 12th century and is the oldest monastery in Slovenia. It includes the hamlets of Rupe, Štorovje (in older sources also Stornje), and Svinjska Vas (Slovene: Svinjska vas, German: Schweindorf). A former hamlet named Kaffeehaus also stood between Svinjska Vas and Rupe.

== Name ==
Stična was first attested in 1136 as Sitik and Siticum (and as Sitich in 1190, Sitic in 1215, Sittich in 1241, and Sitizena in 1689). It is derived (via dissimilation) from *Štična, which developed through vowel reduction from *Žitičina, created from the personal name *Žitiťь (which was the basis for the German name Sittich). *Žitiťь was a hypocorism of the name *Žitъ. An archaic variant of the name, Zatičina, was still used in the early 20th century. The settlement was known as Sittich in German in the past.

== Notable people ==
Notable people that were born or lived in Stiča include:

- Peter Držaj (1913–1944), Partisan doctor
- Joannes Disma Floriantschitsch de Grienfeld (1691–1757), Carniolan astronomer, mathematician, geographer, and cartographer
- Lado Ambrožič (1948–), journalist and editor
