= Joannes Rualdus =

17th century French scholar

- Born: France
- Died: 1636; France
- Citizenship: France
- Occupations: Scholar, writer

Joannes Rualdus or Jean Ruault (1570? – 1636) was a French scholar who compiled a Life of Plutarchus which was prefixed to the Paris Edition of 1624, in two volumes folio, of Plutarch's works.
