= Joannes Disma Floriantschitsch de Grienfeld =

Ducatus Carnioliae Tabula Chorographica

Joannes Disma Floriantschitsch de Grienfeld (Slovenized: Ivan or Janez Dizma Florjančič de Grienfeld; July 1, 1691 – 1757) was a Carniolan astronomer, mathematician, geographer, and cartographer.

== Life and work ==
Floriantschitsch de Grienfeld was born in Ljubljana. He served in a series of important church functions, finishing his career in 1757 as the archdeacon of Stična Abbey. In 1744, he published the first map of Carniola, titled Ducatus Carnioliae Tabula Chorographica (Chorographic Map of the Duchy of Carniola) at a scale of 1:111,000. He also wrote a book on gnomonics and a work on measuring time, and he built his own observatory. From his writings it is clear that he was familiar with the methods of astronomy at the time. His two Latin manuscripts, which are held by the National and University Library of Slovenia in Ljubljana, preserve many essays on astronomy and mathematics, tables with instructions for making astronomical calculations, tables and a theory about the movement of the Sun and to some extent also the Moon and the planets for the Gregorian calendar for the Ljubljana meridian, a geometry manual, writings about squaring the circle, and his own observations on the Sun and Moon.
