= Joannes Olaus Alnander =

- Born: 1694; Norrköping
- Died: 1737 (age 43)
- Occupation: Author

Joannes Olaus Alnander (Johan Olaf Alnander), (1694–1737), author of the History of Printing in Sweden (Historiola artis Typographicae in Suecia, Uppsala, 1722), was born towards the end of the seventeenth century, at Norrköping. An analysis of this work is described in Acta Eruditorum Lipsiens. Supplem. viii. 506. Another work by him, published at Uppsala in 1721, is titled Notitiæ Litterariæ sectionis primæ pars III. exhibens res Judæorum, etc. Praes. E. Benzelius.

His son, Samuel Johansson Alnander, was an accomplished theologist and writer.
