= Joannès Marietton =

French politician

Joannès Marietton (27 August 1860, in Lyon – 27 May 1914) was a French politician. He belonged to the French Section of the Workers' International (SFIO). He was a member of the Chamber of Deputies from 1906 to 1914.
