= Stična Abbey =

Christian monastery in Slovenia

- Stična Abbey

Religion
- Governing body: Cistercian Order

Location
- Location: Stična, Ivančna Gorica Municipality, Slovenia
- Interactive map of Stična Abbey
- Coordinates: 45°57′25.19″N 14°48′20.70″E

Architecture
- Architects: Francesco Ferrata (1694), Candido Zulliani (middle 18th century)
- Founder: Pellegrinus I., Patriarch of Aquileia
- Official name: Stična - Abbey of Stična

Stična Abbey (Slovene: Cistercijanska opatija Stična, also Samostan Stična; German: Kloster Sittich, Latin: Sitticum) is the oldest monastery in Slovenia. It is the only Cistercian monastery in the country still operating (the other was Kostanjevica Abbey in Kostanjevica na Krki). Its mother house was Rein Abbey in Austria.

== History ==
The abbey foundation charter was issued in 1136 by Pellegrinus I, Patriarch of Aquileia, although monastic life had begun a year earlier, in 1135. The monastery at Stična quickly became an important religious, cultural, and economic centre.

In addition to an ordinary school, the monastery also operated a music school, where the Renaissance composer Jacobus Gallus is believed to have received his earliest musical education. The successful life of the monastery was hampered by Ottoman raids, and was burned and looted twice. In 1784 Emperor Joseph II abolished the monastery, dissolved under the Josephine Reforms, but it was resettled again in 1898 by monks from Mehrerau Abbey on the shore of Lake Constance.

During the Second World War, the Partisans use the abbey as a prison for priests that they had captured.

=== Stična manuscript ===
The monastery's scriptorium was already producing illuminated Latin manuscripts in the 12th century, and it was here that the Stična manuscript, written in Slovene, was produced in the 15th century.

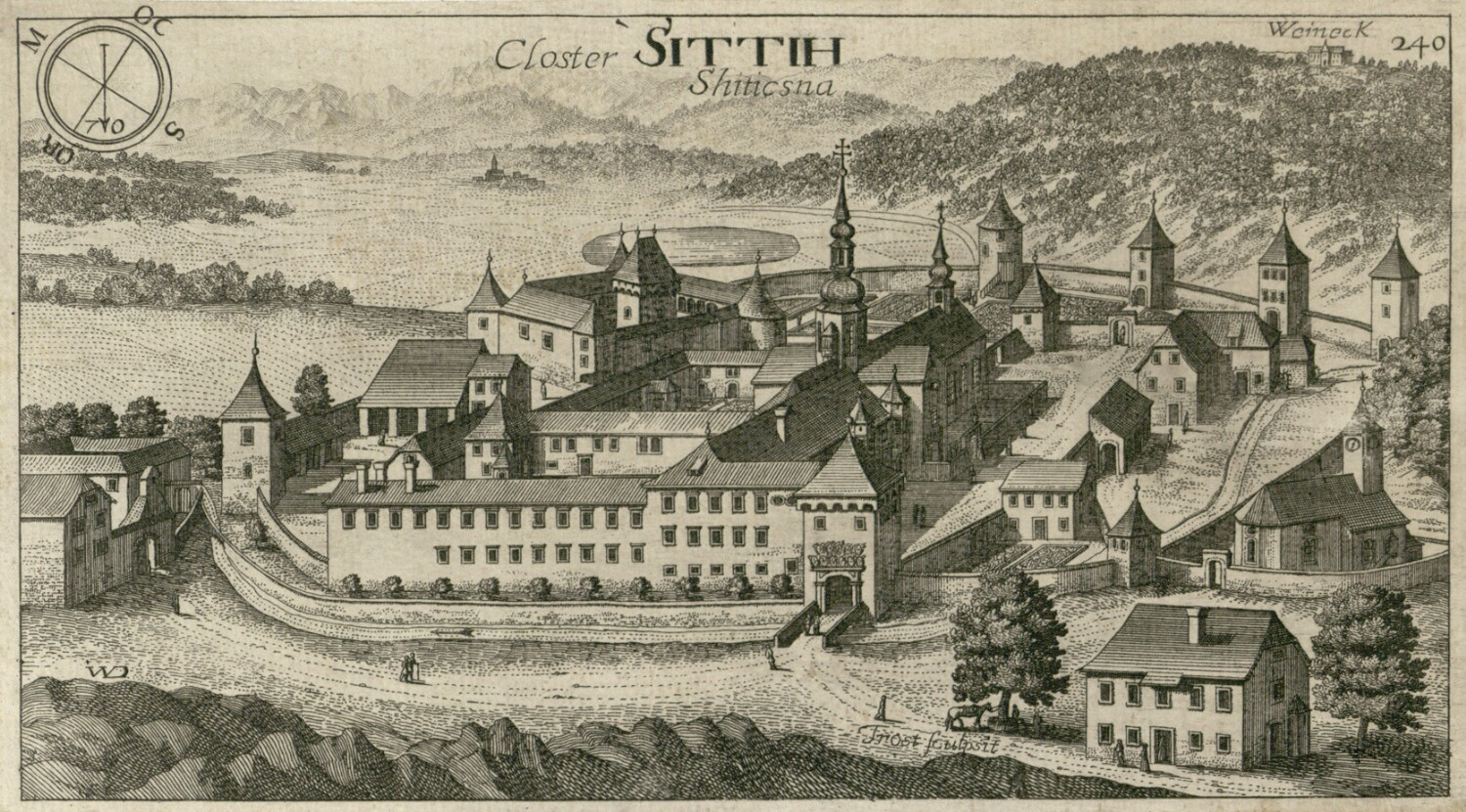
Valvasor's depiction of Stična from 1679

== Architecture ==
In terms of architecture, abbey has been repeatedly modified, leaving Romanesque and Gothic traces in Baroque buildings. The oldest core of the abbey has been preserved. The abbey has a basilica dedicated to Our Lady of Sorrows, which serves as a parish church. The abbey and Romanesque basilica are recognized as cultural monuments of national significance.

=== List of abbots ===
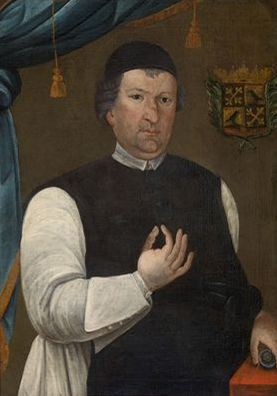
V. Dienersperg, abbot of Stična

The list of abbots
Name	Period
Vincencij	1135/36–1150 in 1163–1167/68
Aldeprand	between 1150–1163
Folknand	1167/68–1180
Bernold	1181–21. februar 1226
Konrad	approx. 1230–approx. 1250
Janez Gall	approx. 1250–approx. 1260
Ditrik	approx. 1260–1266/67
Konrad	1266/67–approx. 1280
Henrik	approx. 1280–1302
Rudolf	1303–approx. 1314/15
Friderik Limpach	approx. 1315–approx. 1321
Nikolaj Hmeljniški	approx. 1321–approx. 1326
Eberhard Planinski	approx. 1326–1332
Štefan	1332–1333
Oton	1333–1335/36
Janez	1336–1341
Nikolaj	1341–1348
Peter	1348/49–1360 in 1365–1366
Arnold	1360–1365 in 1366–1370
Jakob	1370/71–1382
Andrej Čreteški	1382–1387/88
Albert Lindeški	1388–13.July 1405
Peter Limschak	13. July 1405 – 1427/28
Lavrencij Forrer	1427/28–1431/32
Emerik Perenny	1432–approx. 1441
Matej Zaletel	7.February 1441–10.September 1449
Gerhard	1449/50–1450
Ulrik	approx. 1450–1481
Ožbalt	1481/82–1487/88
Tomaž	1487/88–13.December 1494
Martin	13.December 1494 – 1499/1500
Janez	1499/1500–approx. 1511
Tomaž	1511/12–before 13.March 1516
Urban Gall	before 13.March 1516–22.August 1523
Janez Glavič	22.August 1523–4. September 1530
Klemen Gutsold	before 14.November 1530 – 1533/34
Janez Cerar	1533/34–1549
Wolfgang Neff	before 6.March 1549–18.March 1566
Janez Zeisel	24.April 1566–21.September 1576
Jakob Klafferle	31. januar 1577–7. March 1580
Lavrencij Zupan	21.April 1580–26.December 1600
Jakob Reinprecht	14.April 1603–13.January 1626
Matej Majerle	21.March 1626–4.June 1628
Janez Anžlovar	after 25.July in before 30.August 1628–13.March 1638
Janez Weinzirl	26.April 1644–2.December 1660
Maksimilijan Mottoch	2.January 1661–18.January 1680
baron Ludovik Raumbschüssel	26.May 1680–5.December 1687
baron Anton Gallenfels	14.February 1688–12.April 1719
baron Aleksander Engelshaus	28.June 1719–9.March 1734
Viljem Kovačič	25.July 1734–12.May 1764
baron Frančišek Ksaverij Taufferer	27.September 1764–25.Oktober 1784

== Gallery ==
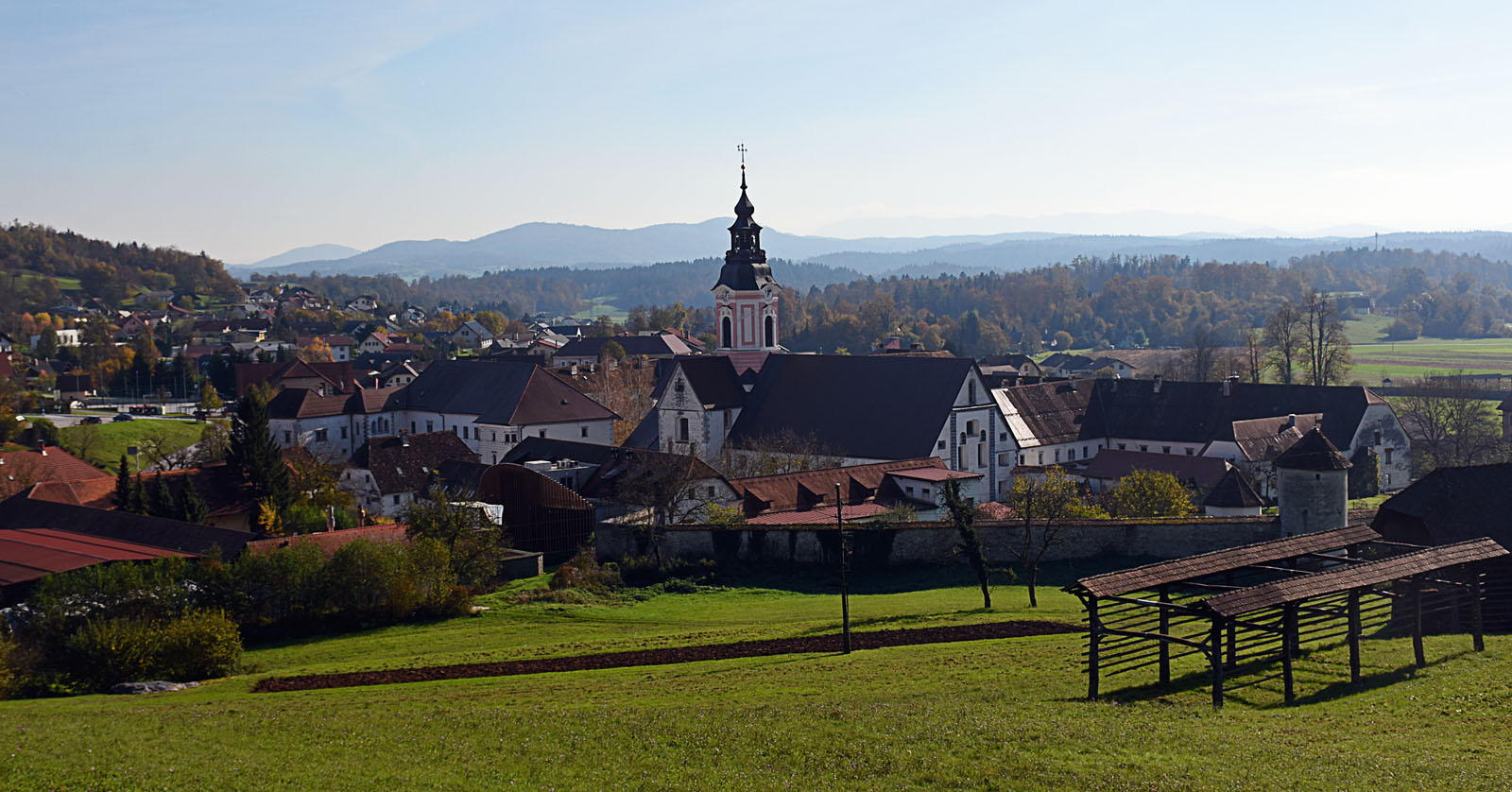
From the north

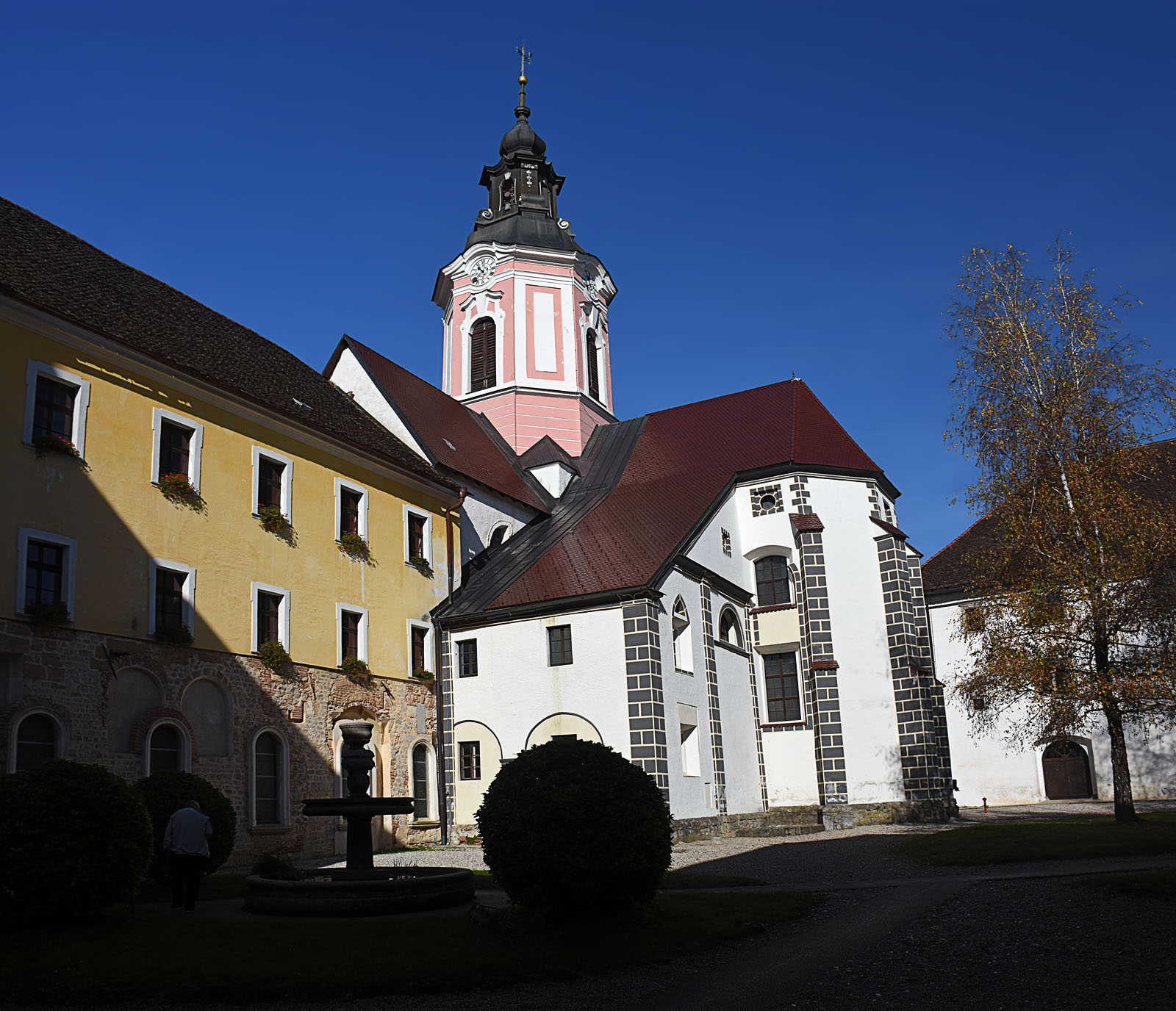
Inner yard

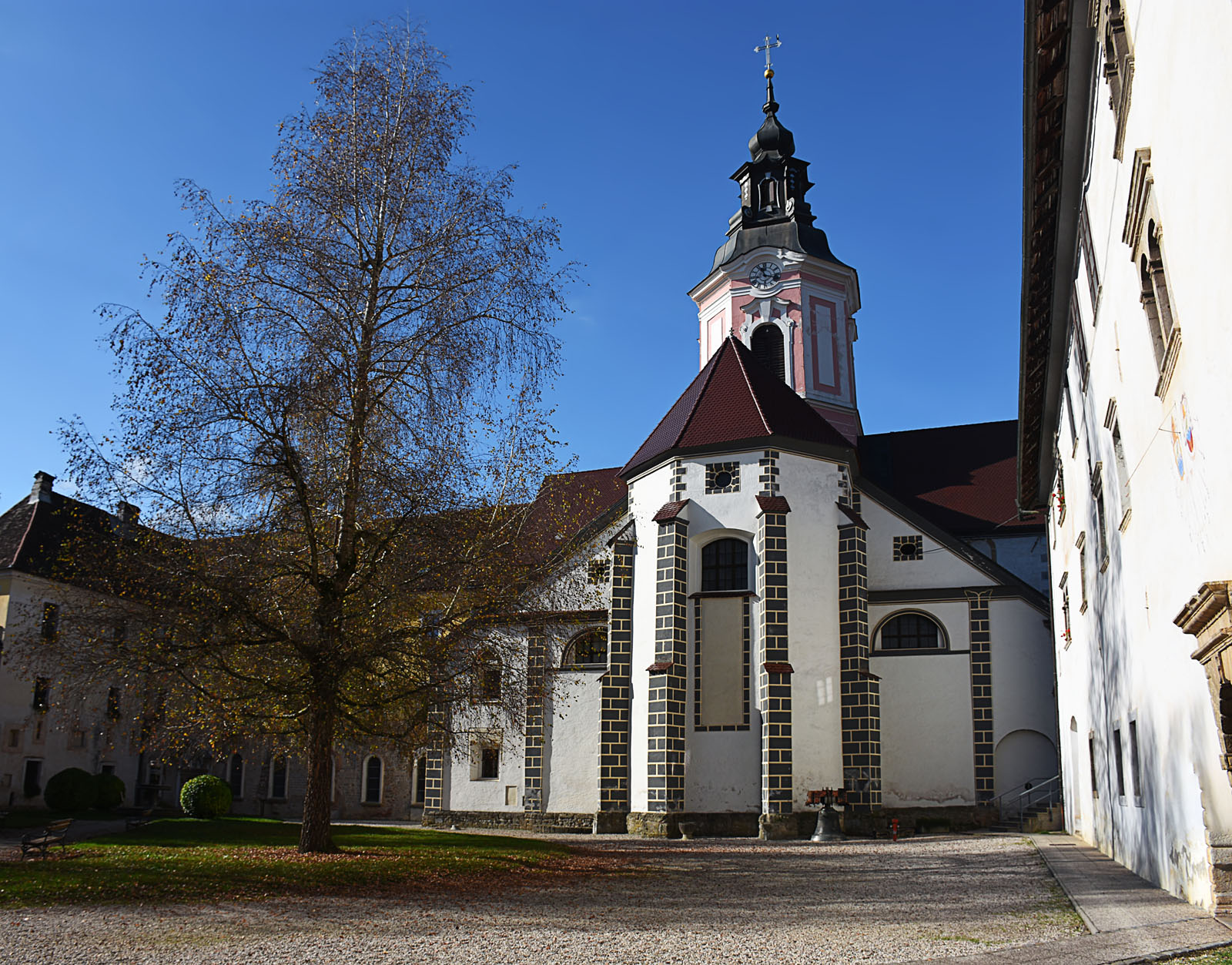
Inner yard

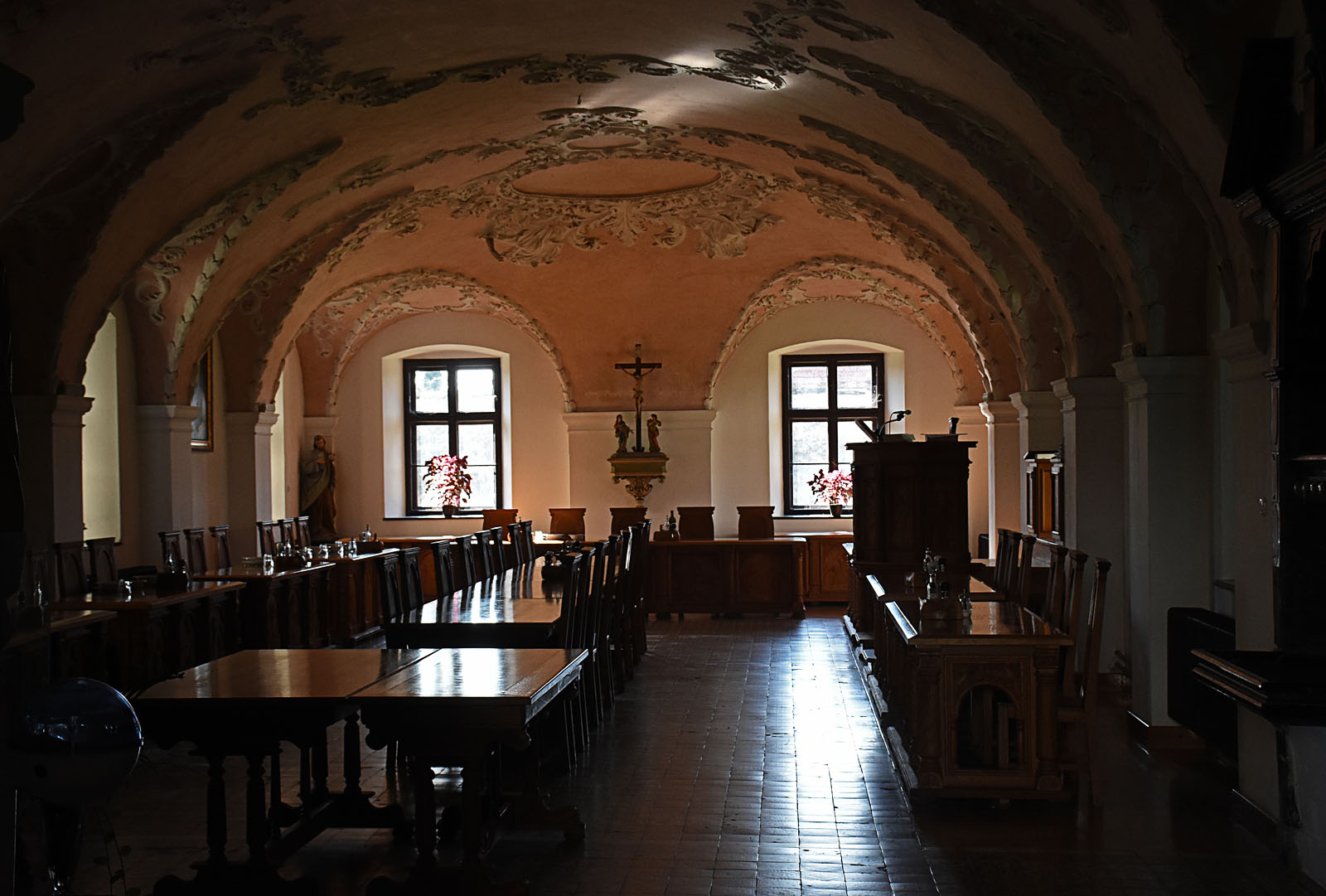
Refectory

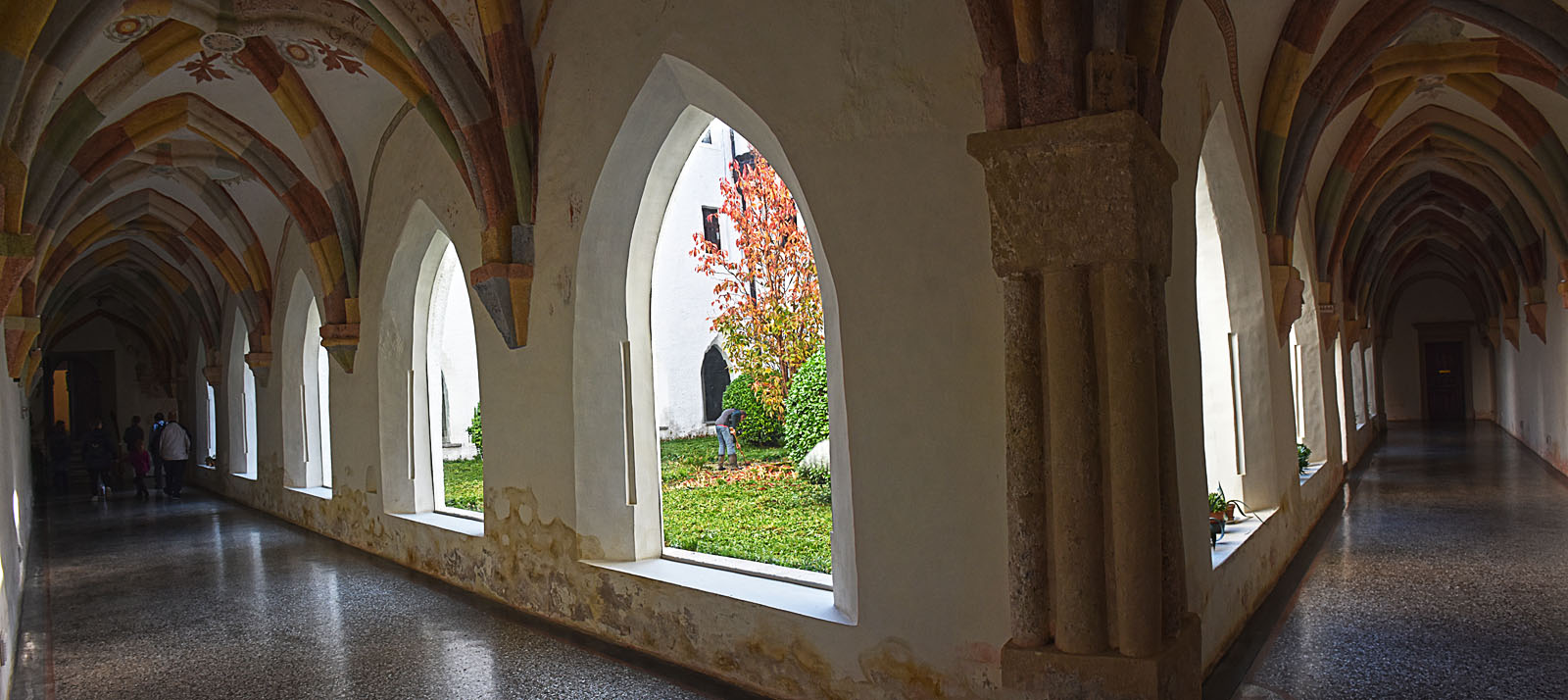
Cloister

== Institutions and festivities related to the abbey ==
They abbey at one point had a high school inside, at the present there is a Museum of Christianity and a parish of Stična. Every year there is a cultural youth festivity called Stična mladih.

=== Museum of Christianity in Slovenia ===
The Museum is state owned and serves as a central museum institution on the topic of sacral heritage.

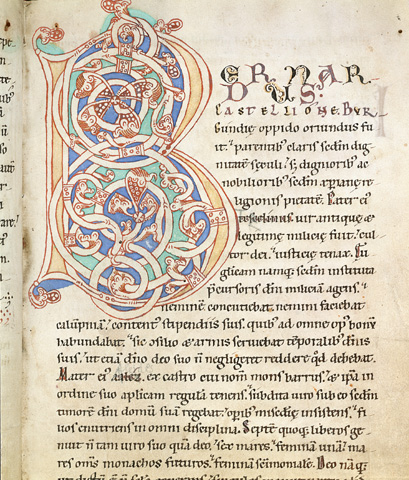
Collectarium, manuscript from 1180

=== Sitik d.o.o. ===
Abbey of Stična made a part of the economical tourism and herbalic pharmacy available to the laymen. There is a small teahouse with kindergarten toys and tourist shop. The pharmacy of late cistercian herbalist Simon Ašič is evidence of the gardening that was a traditional occupancy of the monks. Sittik d.o.o. gardens to this day on 4000 m2 of land, growing about 250.000 room plants every year.

=== Festival Stična mladih ===
Festival Stična mladih is a yearly event where about 8000 young people come to have fun. The entire program in mostly organized and led by young people from Slovenia. The event was inspired by the World Youth Day, theme of a festival is copied from the theme of the World Youth Day, even the program of the festival is inspired by the Popes message to the young.

=== Stiška gimnazija, Gymnasium of Stična ===
Josip Jurčič High School was founded in 1945 as an incomplete high school. In 1946 the teachings began in the abbey. The School became complete in 1950, but more than once existence of the school was questionable. In 1970 school got the name after the known local writer and journalist. In 1980 Municipality of Grosuplje decided to move away from the Abbey in to bigger quarters. In June 1984 the last generation of students who were taught in the abbey concluded their high school education.

== Sources ==
- Jože Mlinarič, Stiška opatija 1136-1784, Novo mesto 1995, Dolenjska založba
- Ivan Stopar, Hrami tišine, Ljubljana 2009, Viharnik
- Vanja Požegar, Cistercijani in nastanek cisterc na Slovenskem, Maribor 2009, bachelor's thesis
- http://cistercijani.sticna.si/
- http://sticna.rkc.si/sl/
- http://sitik.si/
- Bahor, Stanislav: "Skriti knjižni zakladi" Ljubljana, NUK, 2009 COBISS 246170368
- Trnovšek, Tadej: "Zaklad pisarja Bernarda" Stična, Muzej krščanstva na Slovenskem, 2011 COBISS 259190784
- Golob, Nataša: "Srednjeveški kodeksi iz Stične: XII. stoletje", Ljubljana, Slovenska knjiga, 1994COBISS 34920193

== External pages ==
- Stična Abbey
- Consecration to the Hearts of Jesus and Mary
- Stična Youth Festival (in Slovene)
- Stična Manuscript. National and University Library of Slovenia.
