= Joannes Roucourt =

Christian theologian and parish priest

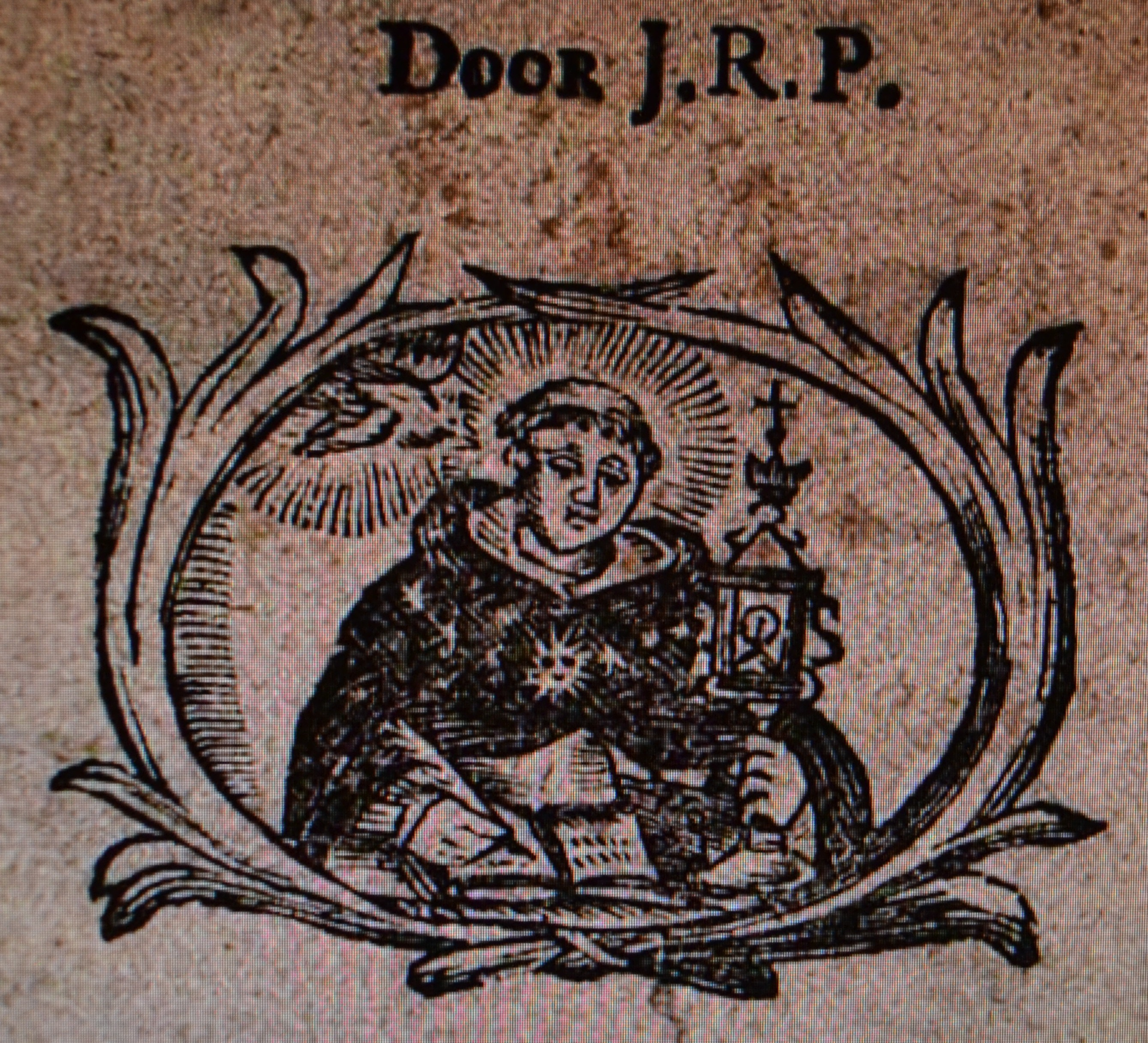
Image at the cover of "Aen-leydinge tot de deught van penitentie, of de Oprechte bekeeringhe des sondaers." By J.(oannes) R.(oucourt) P.(riest), 1673.

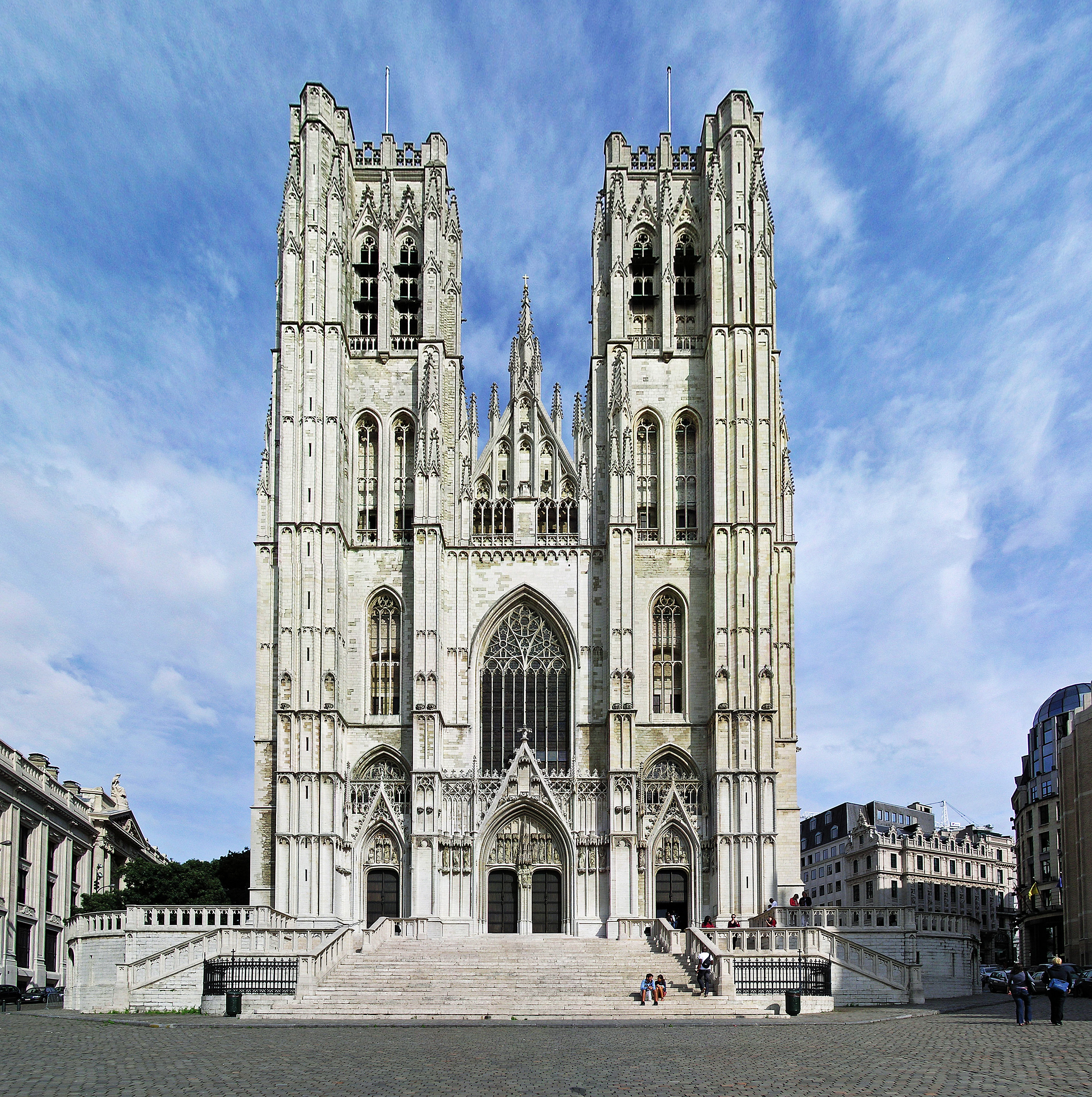
Former Collegiate Church of St. Michael and St. Gudula in Brussels. Since 1962, it has been the co-cathedral of the Metropolitan Archdiocese of Mechelen–Brussels, together with St. Rumbold's Cathedral in Mechelen.

Joannes (Jean, John) Roucourt (baptized 7 June 1636 in Leuven; died 26 September 1676 in Brussels) was a Christian theologian and the parish priest of the Collegiate Church of St. Michael and St. Gudula in Brussels from 1667 until 1676. As a pastor, he was known as "father of the poor".

== Life ==
=== Ethnicity and education ===
Roucourt was baptized on 7 June 1636 in the Saint-Jacobs church as a son of cloth-merchant Theodorus van Roucourt and Joanne Verwijst. His cousins Dirk Roucourt and Hendrik Rocourt (Recourt) were brewer at Diest and horticulturist at Dordrecht, respectively. His forefathers originated from the Walloon region of Liège and the original family name was most likely "de Rocourt". At the age of 16, Joannes completed his candidate training at the Faculty of Arts of the Old University of Leuven. He then studied theology, followed lectures at "De Burcht" and graduated in 1660, receiving his Bachelor of Sacred Theology. From that year on, he also studied philosophy and in 1663 Joannes received his Licenciate of Sacred Theology. He taught philosophy and in the thesis of Gerardus van der Masen "Tractatus de Aristotelis metaphysica" (1661-1662), Joannes Roucourt is mentioned as a professor at the University of Leuven. On 3 April 1664 Joannes was present in the St. Peter's Church of Halen and witnessed the baptism of his niece, Maria Roucourt.

=== Parish priest ===
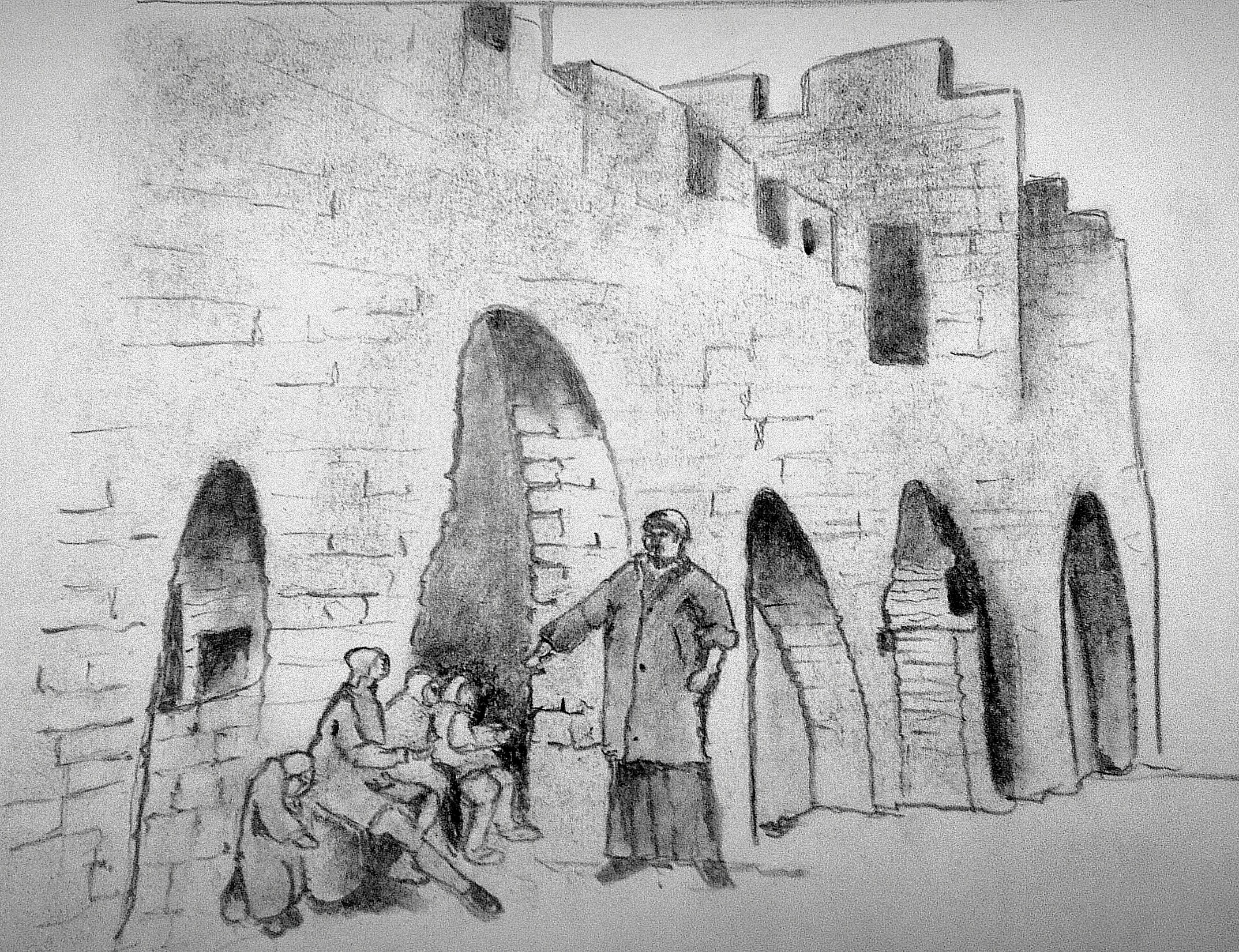
Joannes Roucourt, father of the poor. The charity of Joannes shone especially during the eight years the plague knocked about the Brussels region. He often stood for hours at the city walls on the side of Schaerbeek. He there found people who were infected with the disease and who wanted to cleanse their souls of sins, from whom he took their confessions. Then he comforted them and sent them -strengthened by alms- to the common hospital. Artist's impression (2015) by Ronald H. Recourt.

During 1667-1676, Joannes was the parish priest of the Collegiate Church of St. Michael and St. Gudula (now Brussels' cathedral) and as such responsible for the pastoral tasks of his parish. According to Henne & Wauters he was known as the "father of the poor" and he lived himself in great austerity. When receiving goods from wealthy people, he sold these and divided the proceeds among the 'souffrants de Jesus-Christ'. Joannes also donated his wages of several thousand florins, which he earned by teaching at the Old University of Leuven, to the poor people of Brussels. According to his death announcement, he also took care of the sick people, prisoners and soldiers. Due to his large generosity, his friends had to regularly support him with necessities of life.

=== Theologian ===
Through a number of publications, Joannes Roucourt left his mark in the history of Christian theology, including in the area of penance. His works are based on a strong pastoral thought and free from doctrines, says Lucien Ceyssens. He preached that confessors of penance should also actively practice the Christian virtues and that they worked to prevent their flaws, such as blasphemy and cursing. The Italian Cardinal Giovanni Bona complimented Roucourt in 1674 with his books and wrote to him: I appreciate your method of questions and answers, which is very suitable to instruct believers and to convince heretics. Where others fail by writing (too) thick books, you are able to capture the essence in short phrases. Joannes was also book censor of theological works and has given his approval to books from J. Vande Velde and Gummarus Huyghens.

=== Death ===
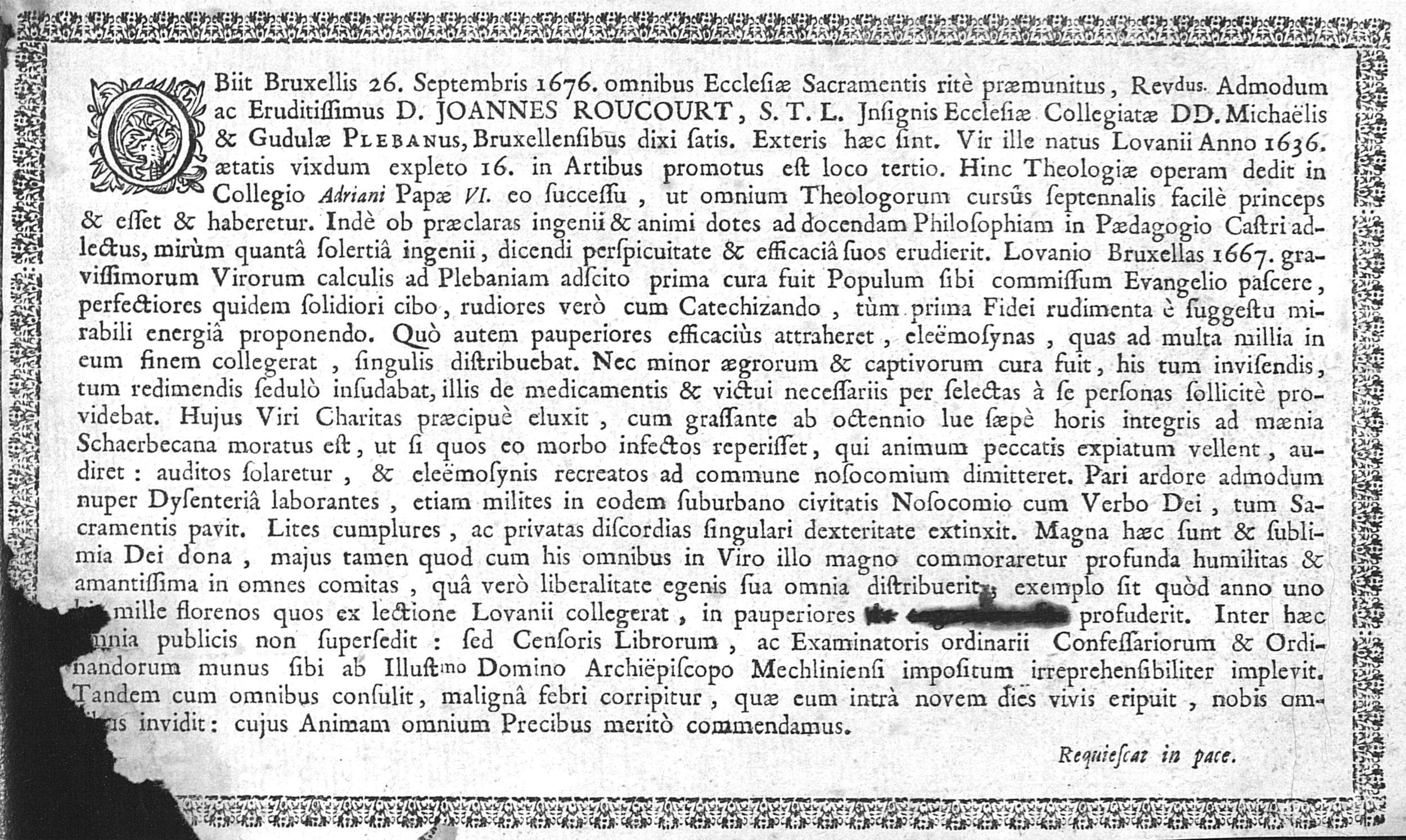
Death notice of Joannes Roucourt, describing his life in Latin

While still being very active in performing all of his duties, he died from a malignant fever in Brussels on 26 September 1676 at the age of 40. Two days later, he was buried in the Collegiate Church of St. Michael and St. Gudula, probably in the tomb of the Schockaert family who regarded him highly. His honorable death announcement is preserved in the State Archives of Brussels (Anderlecht), describing the course of his life.

== Bibliography ==
1. Tractatus de Aristotelis metaphysica (1661-1662). Joannes Roucourt (professor); Joannes Udalricus Randaxhe (professor); Gerardus van der Masen (student); Pedagogie De Burcht, Leuven. Ex Cathedra
2. Aen-leydinge tot het oprecht geloove, door de merck-teeckenen der waerachtige Kercke Christi (1671). Door J(oannes)R(oucourt)P(riester). Te Leuven: by H. Nempe. 14 editions known. edition 1681
3. Aen-leydinge tot de christelijcke hoope door het aanwijsen van't ghene men hoopen moet, en[de] waer op onse hoope moet steunen (1672). Door J(oannes)R(oucourt)P(riester). Te Ghendt: by Bauduyn Manilius (Boekdrukker). 10 editions known.
4. Aen-leydinge tot de deught van penitentie, ofte Oprechte bekeeringhe des sondaers (1673). Door J(oannes)R(oucourt)P(riester). Tot Loven: by Hieronymus Nempe (Boekdrukker). 13 editions known. first edition
5. Catechismus van de penitentie, oft der boedtveerdigheyt. Te Leuven: by H. Nempe. Several editions known. Herdruk tot Ghendt in 1676 door Franciscus en Dominicus vander Ween
