= Clarissa Nevius =

American politician (1877–1962)

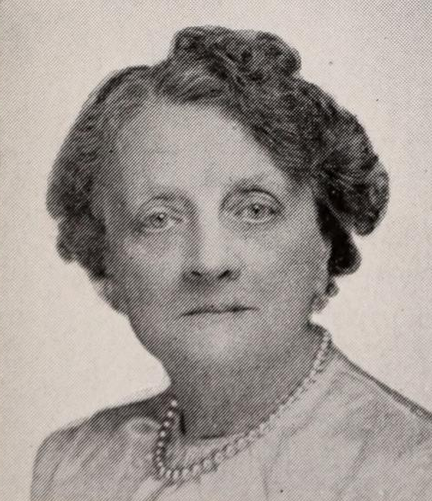
- Nevius c. 1946

Member of the Connecticut House of Representatives from New Fairfield
- In office 1923–1953
- Preceded by: Marshall Treadwell
- Succeeded by: C. Arthur Bjorklund

Personal details
- Born: August 1, 1877 Danbury, Connecticut, U.S.
- Died: March 18, 1962 (aged 84) New Fairfield, Connecticut, U.S.
- Party: Republican
- Spouse: George M. Nevius (died 1960)

Clarissa Elwell Nevius (August 1, 1877 – March 18, 1962) was an American politician who served in the Connecticut House of Representatives from 1923 to 1953, representing the town of New Fairfield as a Republican.

Nevius' husband, George M. Nevius, was also a member of the Connecticut House of Representatives. He represented New Fairfield as a Democrat from 1907 to 1909 and 1913 to 1915. The two were married until George died in 1960.
