= Joannes Nevius =

Joannes Nevius or Joannes Neef (March 1627 - circa June 1672) was the third secretary of New Amsterdam under the Director-General of New Netherland. He became the first secretary of New York City under the English.

== Biography ==
Coat of Arms of Joannes Nevius

Nevius was the son of or Joannes Neef(f) Sr. and Maria Becks. He was baptized 14 March 1627 at his father's church in Zoelen, Gelderland, in the Dutch Republic. He moved with the family to Venlo in 1634. Sometime before 1646, the family moved to Kampen (his father may have been dead by that point).

Nevius entered the University of Leyden in 1646. In 1651 (or possibly 1650), he sailed to America, probably leaving from Amsterdam. When he landed in Manhattan, it contained perhaps 1,000 inhabitants. Peter Stuyvesant was governor. The village was called Manhattoes until 1653, when it was incorporated as the city of New Amsterdam.

Joannes Nevius was probably a merchant when he first arrived. The first record of him in Manhattan is March 3, 1652, when he witnessed a baptism. On March 13, 1653, he was assessed 100 guilders to help pay for the city's defensive wall. On September 1, 1653, he was appointed arbitrator in a suit for wages.

On November 18, 1653, he married Adriaentje Bleijck. On November 22, 1653, he signed a "Remonstrance of the Merchants of New Amsterdam in Regard to the Imposition of Import Duties."

He owned a lot at what is now 80 Broadway and may have had his house there. This land was taken from him by the city on May 3, 1657, for a parade ground.

November 30, 1654, he appeared in court as attorney-in-fact for his father-in-law, who was defendant in a suit regarding the construction and outfitting of a ship, the Nieuwe Liefde. This suit dragged on for several years.

December 8, 1654, Joannes Nevius was named a city Schepen (filling the term of a Schepen who had been murdered). There were five city Schepens and two Burgomasters, who sat as magistrates and city council in the Court of Burgomasters and Schepens at the Stadt Huis, or city hall.

On January 31, 1655, his term as Schepen was renewed for one year.

By January 18, 1655, Joannes Nevius was a deacon in the Dutch church.

On March 2, 1655, Nevius purchased a house on the north side of Pearl St. (present nos. 35 & 37). He probably moved to this house from the house at 80 Broadway.

September 15, 1655, New Amsterdam was attacked by 2,000 Indians, who destroyed 28 farms, killed 100 settlers, and took 150 prisoners.

On January 24, 1656, Joannes Nevius appeared as the plaintiff in a suit against Pieter van Couwenhoven for action on a debt of 283 florins.

February 7, 1656, Nevius' term as Schepen expired. Some time during 1656 he bought land in Brooklyn, at "The Ferry," probably from his father-in-law.

October 1657, he was sworn in as City Secretary. He resided in the Stadt Huis (71 & 73 Pearl St.). He kept the minutes of the Court of Burgomasters and Schepens, recorded deeds, and prepared official documents. He was also vendue master, i.e., he conducted all public sales (for a fee of 3 guilders per transaction), and he was law librarian. From this time, started spelling his name consistently "Joannes" instead of "Johannes."

On July 22, 1658, he conveyed his house and lot on Pearl St. to Cornelius Steenwyck.

September 6, 1664, the British took New Amsterdam and renamed it New York. In October, all the inhabitants were required to swear an oath of allegiance to King Charles II.

Joannes Nevius continued as City Secretary under the British. On June 12, 1665, the city government was restructured after the British model of mayor, aldermen, and sheriff. On June 19, it was found that the City Secretary could not keep minutes in English, and on June 27 Joannes resigned his position.

The Nevius family moved out of the Stadt Huis and onto Hoogh (High) Street. Not much is known about his whereabouts or activities from 1665 to 1670. By about 1670, Joannes Nevius and family were on the other side of the East River in Brooklyn, leasing and living in the ferry house there. He ran the ferry (probably hiring ferrymen) and a tavern in the ferry house.

Joannes Nevius died in May or June 1672. By June 10, 1672, his wife signed a petition to hold the ferry house as "widow." Following Dutch custom, his grave was probably unmarked and its location is now unknown.
