= Joannes Bunderius =

Joannes Bunderius (or van der Bundere; 1482 – 8 January 1557) was a Flemish Catholic theologian and critic of Protestantism. He was born and died in Ghent.

He entered the Dominican Order in his native city about 1500, and after having made his religious profession was sent to Leuven to pursue his studies in philosophy and theology. He obtained the degree of Lector in Sacred Theology, and in 1517 returned to Ghent, where, until near the close of his life, he taught philosophy and theology. While occupied in teaching he filled the office of Prior of the convent of Ghent three times (1529–35; 1550–53), and discharged the duties of General Inquisitor of the Roman Catholic Diocese of Tournai. As inquisitor he was untiring in his efforts to check the spread of Lutheranism, Calvinism, and the views of the Mennonites; but always used prudence in his dealings with those he saw as heretics.

While prior of the convent of Ghent for the first time, he formed a federation of religious orders in that city for the safeguarding of the faith of the people and of the preservation of the rights of the Catholic Church and the privileges of the monastic orders. In recognition of his ability as a preacher and as a reward for his long work in the pulpit a general chapter of his order conferred upon him the degree of Preacher General. Of his writings, which are nearly all of a polemical character, the most notable are:

- Compendium dissidii quorundam hereticorum (Paris, 1540–43, 1545);
- Compendium concertationis hujus saeculi sapientium et theologorum (Paris, 1549, Venice, 1553, etc.). After the author's death, this work was frequently published under the title: Compendium rerum theologarum, quae hodie in controversia agitantur;
- Detectio nugarum Lutheri cum declaratione veritatis Catholicae (Louvain, 1551);
- De Vero Christi baptismo contra Mennonem Anabaptistarum principe (Louvain, 1553).
