= Joannes de Cordua =

Flemish painter

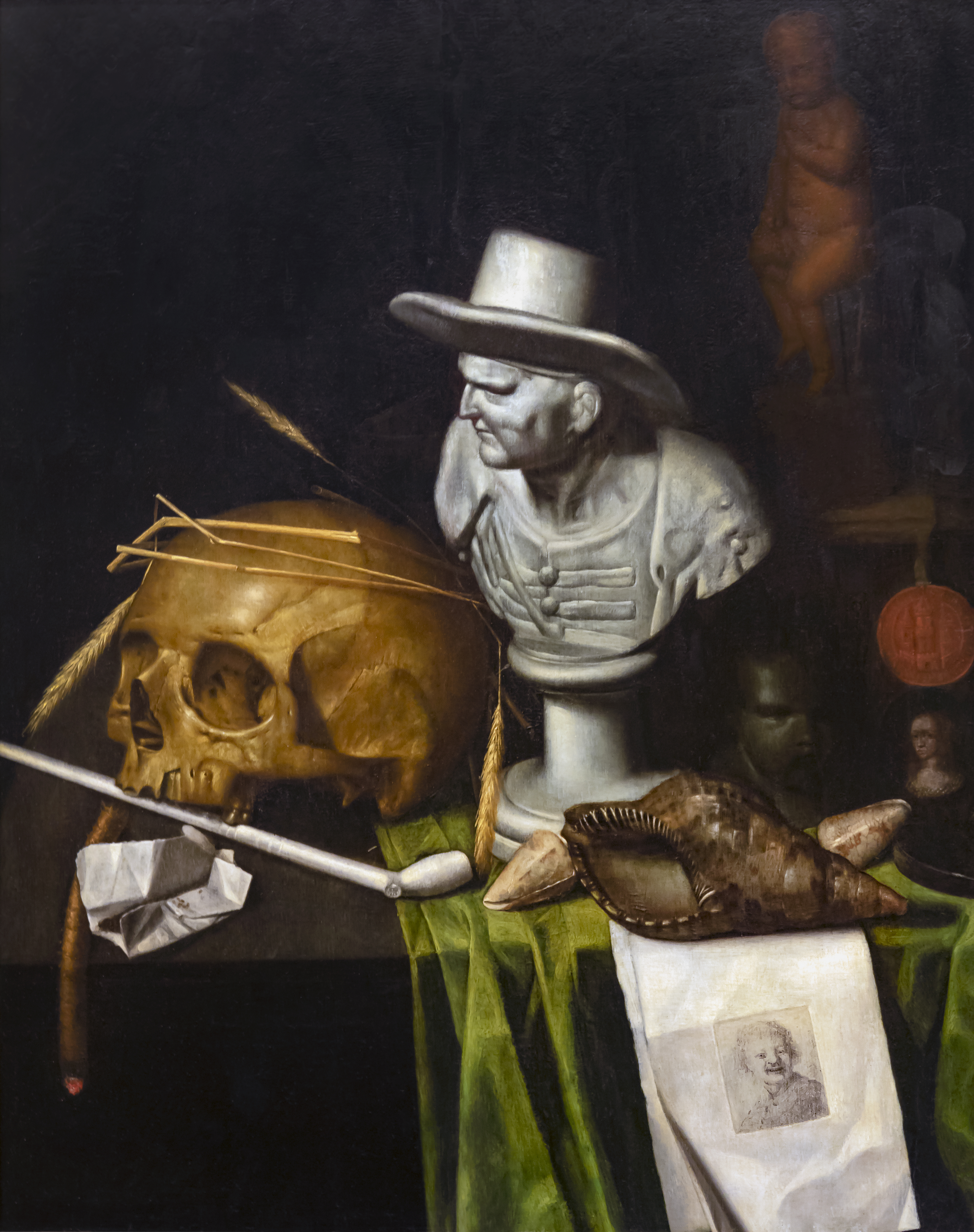
Vanitas still life with a bust

Joannes de Cordua or Johann de Cordua (Note: Variant names: Joannes Corduba, Johannes Corduba, Joannes Courda, Johannes Courda, Joannes Courdo, Johannes Courdo, Johannes Courto, Joannes Curta, Johannes Curta, Joannes Kurte, Johannes Kurte, Joannes Kurte, Johannes Courda, Joannes Courda, Joannes Courdo, Johannes Kurte, Joannes Curta, Johannes Cordua, Joannes Corduba, Johannes Corduba, Joannes Cordua, Joanes de Corduwa, Johannes Courto, Johannes Curta, Johannes de Cordua, Johann du Cortuova) (c. 1630–1702) was a Flemish painter who was mainly active in Vienna and Prague. He is known for his still lifes, peasant scenes, portraits, and biblical themes.

== Life ==
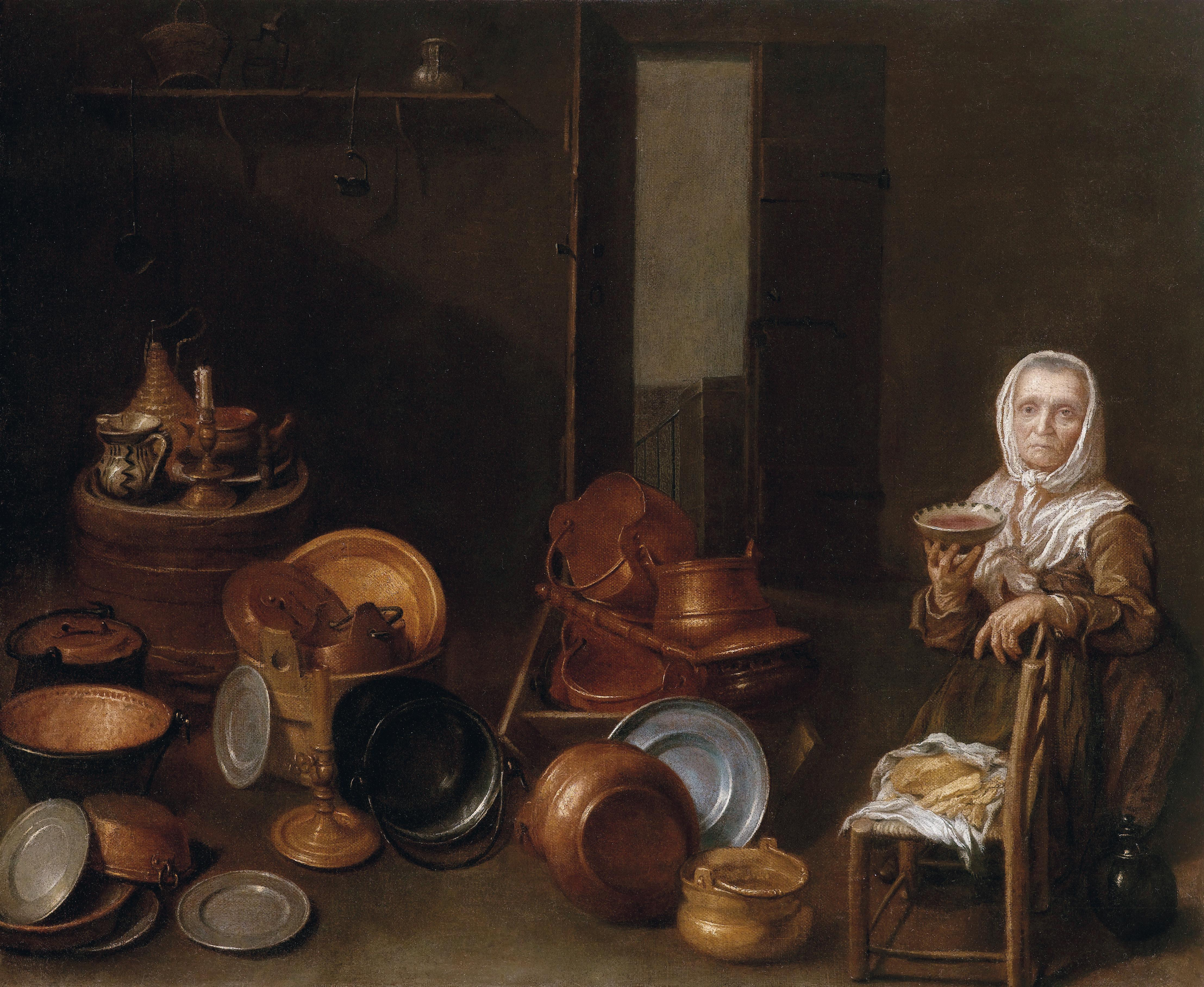
Kitchen interior with an old woman

Very little is known about de Cordua's life and career. From the fact that his fist wife was aged 33 when she died on 11 April 1667, it is presumed that he was born around 1630. Based on the records of his two marriages in Vienna it can be assumed that his birthplace was Brussels.

De Cordua was employed in 1660 in Freising by Bishop Albrecht Sigismund of Bavaria. From 1663 onwards, he was recorded in Vienna where he married Catharina Anna Bergmayer from Wiener Neustadt on 26 July 1663. Catharina Anna died on 11 April 1667, and their daughter, also named Catharina, would die the year after in 1668. About three months after the death of his first wife, de Cordua married his second wife Anna Maria Pfrümer on 19 June 1667. The couple had three sons: Johann Baptist, baptized on 6 February 1670, Johann Gotthard, baptized on 10 July 1675 and buried 11 October 1675, and Joseph, buried on 4 May 1723 at the age of 40.

In 1677 he obtained the Hoffreiheit (Court Freedom), which meant he was relieved from the obligation to be a member of the local guild and had the freedom to practise his art at the Imperial court. It also meant a relief from taxes. He worked in Prague for some time, but it is not clear when he returned to Austria.

The time of his death is not clear. Some art historians have posited that he died in Vienna on 17 October 1698. However, this is the death date of a Johann Baptist Curta (Courdo, Gurta, Kurta, Kurtha, Corda), who, it is assumed, could be a son of the painter Johann Baptist Curta, born 1608, from a Walser family in Gressoney on Monte Rosa, to which many painters belonged. With him Cordua is often confused. It is known Cordua spent time in Prague for an unknown period. He probably died in 1702. There is a record in Vienna reporting the death of a 'Johann du Cortuova' and stating the time of his death as 1702 but it is not clear whether his death occurred while the artist was in Vienna or on a trip to Prague.

== Work ==
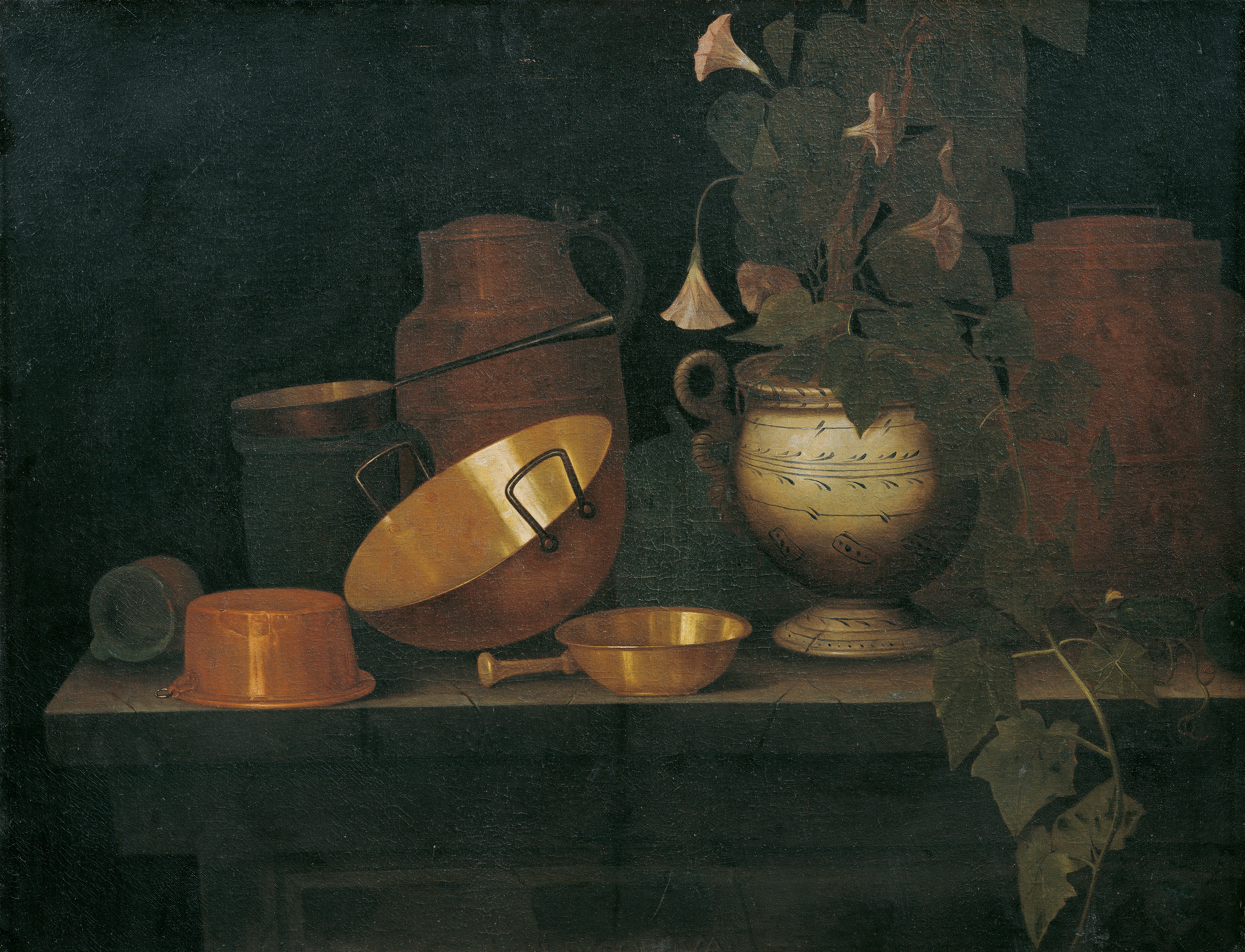
Still life with copper dishes

Joannes de Cordua was a versatile artist who painted still lifes, genre scenes, portraits, and biblical subjects. His contemporary, German art historian Joachim von Sandrart, notes in his comprehensive dictionary of art Teutsche Academie that "Johann von Cordua is a skillful painter of still lifes which he could render in a very natural manner".

The genre paintings of de Cordua include typical genre subjects in Netherlandish art such as the ill-matched couple (representing a couple of widely different ages) (two examples in the Bavarian State Painting Collections), market scenes such as the Saleswoman with a young boy (Valtice Castle, Czech Republic), kitchen scenes such as the Kitchen interior with an old woman (Dorotheum Vienna auction of 12 December 2011, lot 202) and scenes of professionals in their workspace such as a Doctor in his study (Dorotheum Vienna auction of 16 June 2011, lot 123).

His still lifes include vanitas still lifes, fruit still lifes and still lifes of brass and copper utensils and pots as well as hunting still lifes. Many of Cordua's known still-life paintings fall into the category of vanitas paintings. This genre of still life offers a reflection on the meaninglessness of earthly life and the transient nature of all earthly goods and pursuits. This meaning is conveyed in these still lifes through the use of stock symbols, which reference the transience of things and, in particular, the futility of earthly wealth: a skull, soap bubbles, candles, empty glasses, wilting flowers, insects, smoke, watches, mirrors, books, hourglasses and musical instruments, various expensive or exclusive objects such as jewellery and rare shells. The term vanitas is derived from the famous line Vanitas, Vanitas. Et omnia Vanitas, in the book of the Ecclesiastes in the Bible, which in the King James Version is translated as "Vanity of vanities, all is vanity".

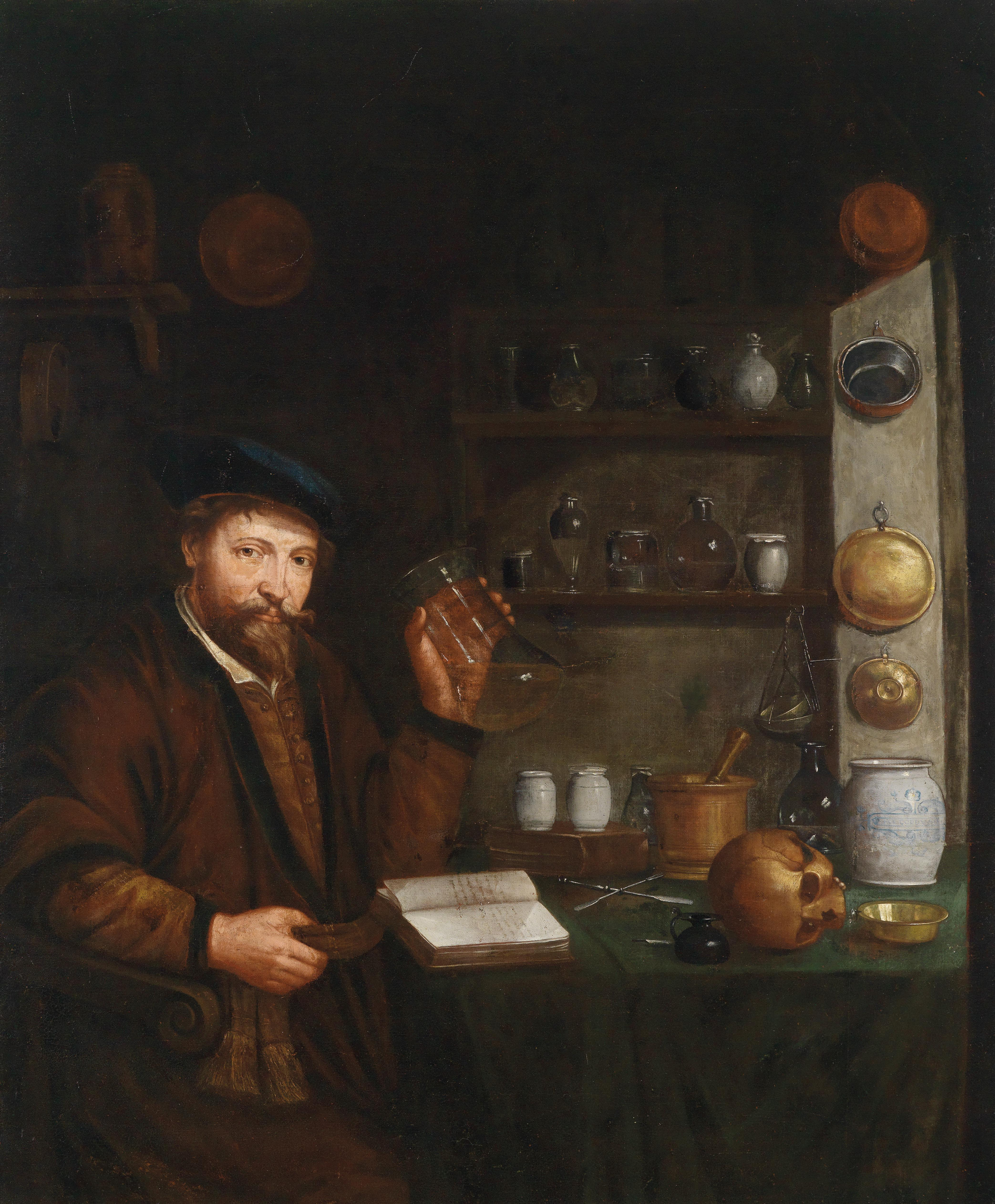
A doctor sitting in his study

The worldview behind the vanitas paintings was a Christian understanding of the world as a temporary place of fleeting pleasures and sorrows from which mankind could only escape through the sacrifice and resurrection of Christ. While most of these symbols reference earthly existence (books, scientific instruments, etc.) and pleasures (a pipe) or the transience of life and death (skulls, soap bubbles, empty shells) some symbols used in the vanitas paintings carry a dual meaning: a rose or an oar of grain refers as much to the brevity of life as it is a symbol of the resurrection of Christ and thus eternal life.

Joannes de Cordua's Vanitas still life with a bust (musée des beaux-arts de Pau) is one of his best-known vanitas paintings. Like most of de Cordua's vanitas still lifes, it includes a skull as one of the key props. The skull is crowned with grain oars which reference earthly distinctions such as a crown as well as symbolise the cycle of life and death, as a grain has to die and put in the earth to grow again. This composition also contains many of the other symbols one can find in vanitas still lifes. The skull seems to hold an empty pipe under its teeth, a reference to the emptiness of earthly pleasure. The statues of the young boy and old man point to the transitory nature of life. The drawing which seems to represent Rembrandt and the medal reference the futility of earthly success and distinctions.

De Cordua also painted a number of still life works which represent copper and tin kitchen utensils. In these works, he shows his skill in rendering the metal surfaces in a naturalistic manner.
