= Yamashiro ikki =

15th-century confederacy in Japan

- 1485–1493
- Location of Yamashiro Province in Japan
- Common languages: Late Middle Japanese
- Religion: Buddhism • Shinto
- Government: Military and civil confederation
- Legislature: Ikki agreements of 1485 and 1486
  - Provincial leadership: Kokujin assembly
  - Local authority: Village councils
- Historical era: Sengoku
  - Ōnin War: 1467–1477
  - Formation: 1485
  - Submission to the Ashikaga shogunate: 1493
  - Last ikki protests in Yamashiro Province: 1511
- Currency: mon, ryō
- Today part of: Japan

The Yamashiro ikki or Yamashiro kuni ikki was a confederacy that emerged in Japan's Yamashiro Province (present-day southern Kyoto Prefecture) during the late 15th century. After the chaotic Ōnin War had weakened the Ashikaga shogunate's authority, feuding samurai armies fought for the control of provinces across Japan. In Yamashiro Province, local samurai and peasants formed an ikki league and rose up in 1485, successfully demanding the withdrawal of two rival warlord armies. The ikki members subsequently organized a new provincial government, defying both warlords as well as the Ashikaga shogun in nearby Kyoto. The Yamashiro ikki continued to operate until 1493, when a new invasion of samurai armies forced its members to reaccept the shogunate's authority. Regardless, Yamashiro Province remained largely under local control, and repeated local uprisings as well as protests continued until 1511.

== Background ==
=== Political, economic, and societal situation under the Ashikaga shogunate ===
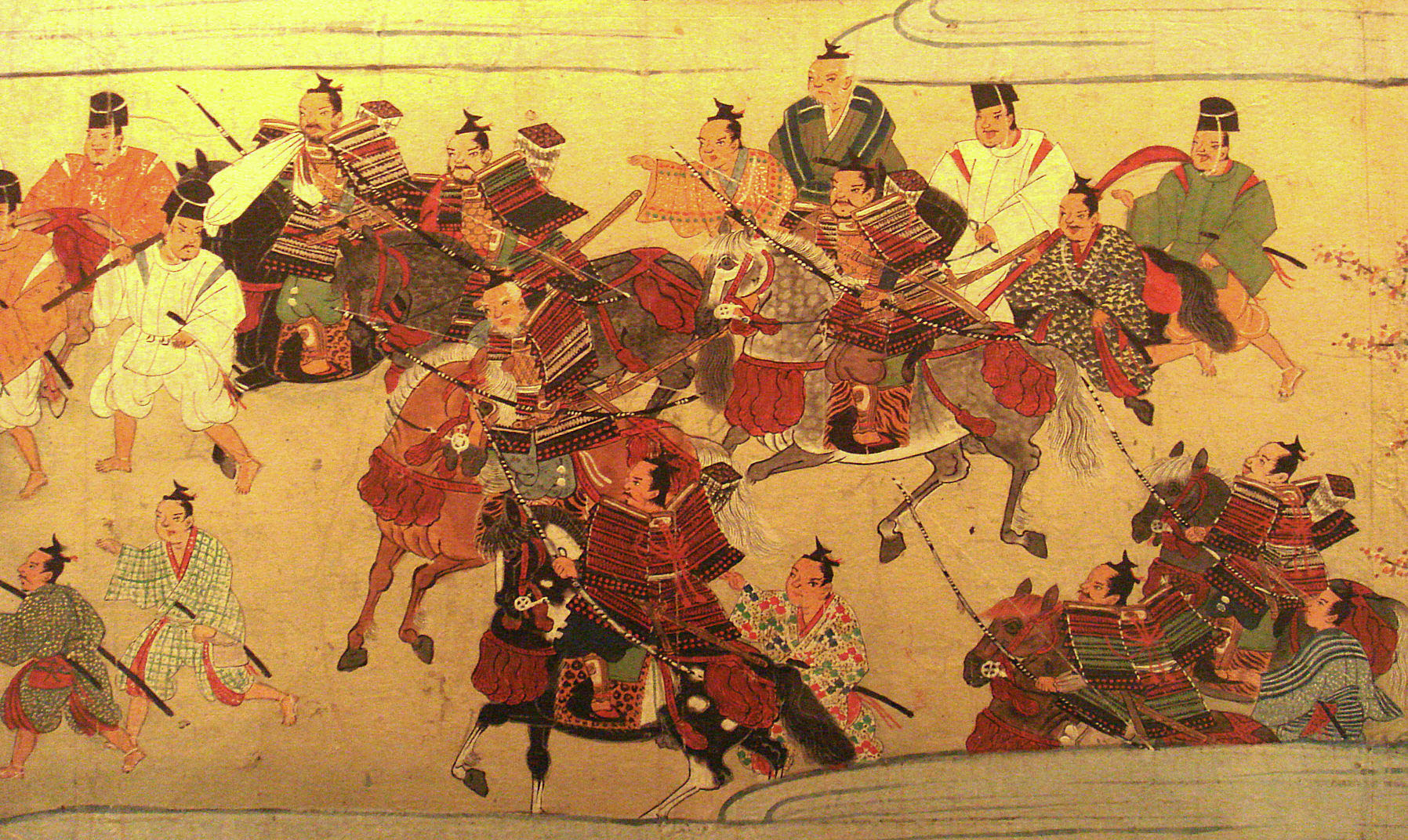
16th-century illustration depicting samurai

From 1336, Japan was led by the Ashikaga shogunate, a military government which had largely reduced the emperors to a ceremonial role. The shogunate was based on the support of the samurai, a military caste. From the ranks of the samurai, the shoguns appointed military governors (shugo) who oversaw the provinces, but mainly stayed in the capital of Kyoto, located in Yamashiro Province. (Note: Even though Kyoto was located in Yamashiro Province, it was administered separately due to its importance and special role as the capital. The urban area was called Rakuchū and administered by the samurai-dokoro, while the remaining province formed its own district and was headed by a shugo.) The shugo were assigned vassal samurai based in the provinces; these were often called kokujin. Over time, the shugo increasingly assumed civil authority in the provinces, while the kokujin ran their fiefs largely as they saw fit. This was facilitated by the samurai being allowed to collect taxes, a task locally carried out by otona, the small number of wealthy individuals in each village. The Ashikaga vassal system encouraged both the shugo as well as the kokujin to divert taxes to themselves and assert ever more financial as well as political autonomy. This created tensions between the shugo and the local vassal samurai, as they competed for resources. The vassal samurai were also much more dependent on the support of local farmers. This meant that whenever the demands of shugo might upset the locals and thus endanger the position of the regional samurai, the latter were inclined to ignore the governors' orders. The system also forced the shoguns to heavily rely on fiscal support from, and taxes in, Kyoto itself.

By the late medieval period, Japan was also experiencing important societal and economic changes. Agricultural productivity increased in the 13th and 14th centuries, allowing small-scale farmers to achieve greater self-sufficiency as well as prosperity. This allowed them to gain more power in the management of their villages, previously the domain of the otona. The village leadership consequently became more representative, strengthening the farmers' association with their community and the villages' independence. At the same time, class relationships became increasingly muddled. The most prosperous farmers began to resemble samurai, as they were able to afford weapons, owned a considerable amount of land, and often had a following consisting of dependent farmers and workers who paid them rent. These wealthy farmers were called jizamurai and grew locally influential, while resenting the tax collection by their official samurai overlords. In addition, the rural population gradually abandoned the small hamlets which had dominated in previous periods. Peasants instead began gathering in larger villages which they could more easily defend in times of crisis; many villages were explicitly fortified to act as community refuges and strongholds.

=== Growing unrest in the 15th century ===
In the first half of the 15th century, disputes within the provinces began to escalate into violence. Local samurai families began to fight each other for the position of shugodai (deputy to the shugo), disobeyed their respective shugo, and involved themselves in succession conflicts within the powerful families which served as shugo. Meanwhile, the tax burden on the rural population grew, as both the central government as well as regional authorities tried to raise more money; many farmers consequently became indebted to moneylenders during times of bad harvests.

In response to these developments, villages began to exert more independence and organize themselves in so-called ikki. There existed different types of ikki, but at their core ikki were parties formed to achieve a common goal, often mutual protection. In this regard, they stood in marked contrast to vassalage relationships, and could include members from different social classes who cooperated on equal footing. An ikki was formed after a group had discussed, written, signed, and ritually celebrated an agreement, thus binding the group members to the agreement's rules. In the early 15th century, ikki began to organize a growing number of protests, often aimed at the cancellation of peasant debts. These protests often turned into violent riots during which ikki members attacked moneylenders, destroyed debt ledgers, burnt public buildings, and looted. Yamashiro Province became especially affected by ikki, with protesting and rioting peasants repeatedly occupying parts of Kyoto. As a result of their association with violence, ikki came to mean both "league" as well as "uprising".

In 1441, Shogun Ashikaga Yoshinori was assassinated by a powerful samurai who had feared that the ruler intended to reduce his family's power. This event greatly weakened the shogunate, as Yoshinori was succeeded by two child shoguns who lacked strong regents. The second of these, Ashikaga Yoshimasa, failed to contain the growing power of the shugo and was more interested in the arts than governing the country. Yoshimasa also first designated his brother Ashikaga Yoshimi as heir before later switching support to his son Ashikaga Yoshihisa. Different factions consequently formed to back the candidates; these groups quickly extended beyond the court and grew to include powerful shugo and samurai clans.

== Yamashiro uprising ==
=== The Onin War and its consequences ===
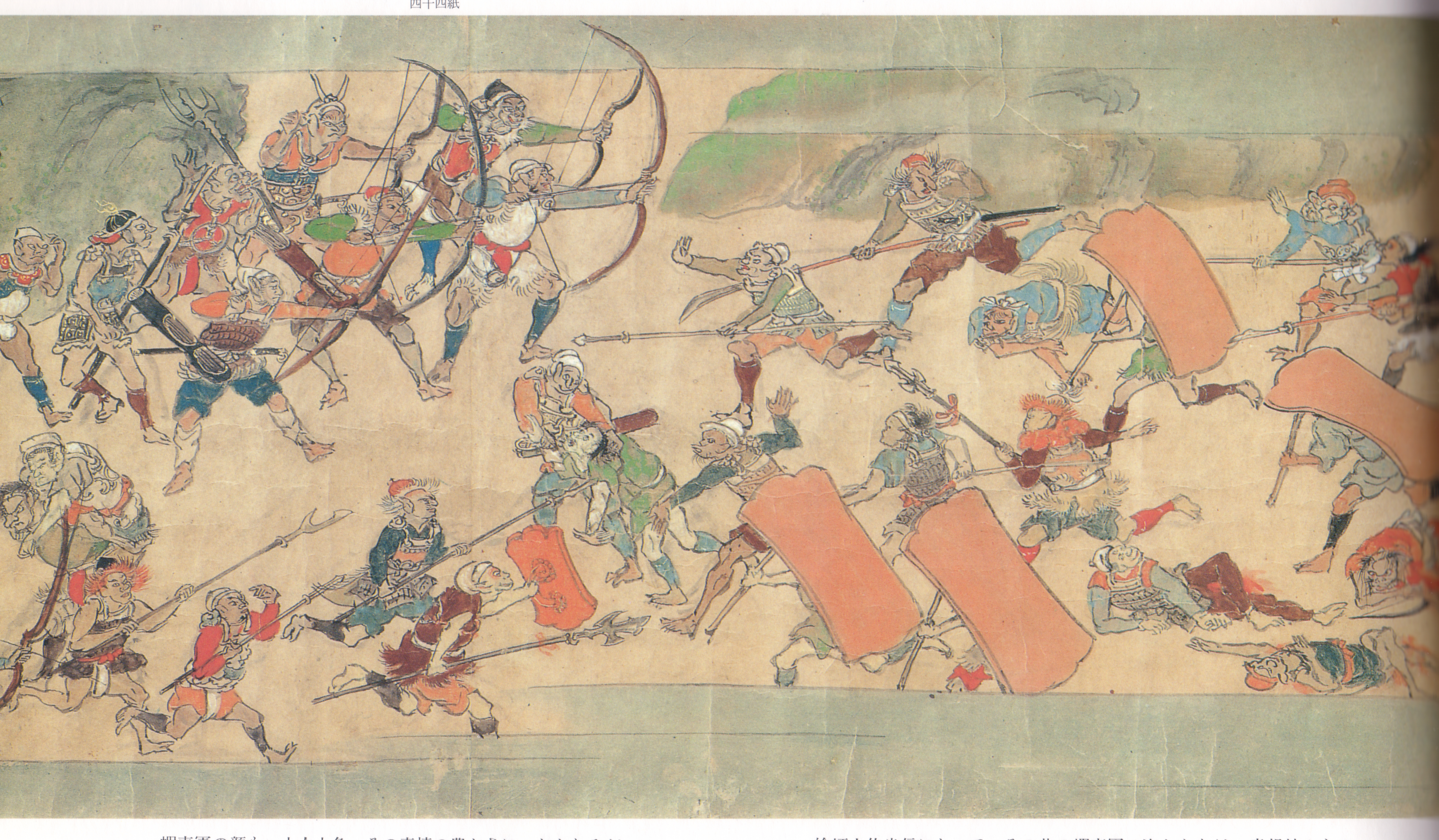
17th-century illustration of a battle during the Ōnin War.

In 1467, the succession dispute finally escalated into full-scale conflict between the rival factions, at this point led by Hosokawa Katsumoto and Yamana Sōzen respectively. This confrontation, later known as the Ōnin War, greatly damaged the shogunate's power. Even though Ashikaga Yoshimasa remained in power, he was no longer able to control the powerful samurai clans. The Ōnin War saw fighting throughout Japan, but the conflict was most intense in Yamashiro Province; Kyoto was mostly destroyed. The jizamurai and peasants of Yamashiro Province took part in the war, fighting for the rival factions and against each other. The war caused a reduction in ikki activity in and around the capital, as the rural population's strength and attention was absorbed by the civil war. Even though Ashikaga Yoshihisa was able to become shogun, the war ultimately ended inconclusively and without a peace agreement in 1477. The shogunate tried to work toward the restoration of its authority, rebuilding the capital and returning to the routine governance. At the same time, many recognized that the war had marked a major rupture. The shugo and many samurai clans maintained the autonomy which they had achieved during the Ōnin War, while continuing their violent feuds. The breakdown of order and government power also encouraged peasants and jizamurai to increase their resistance against deprivations by the samurai armies and taxation.

Despite the end of hostilities in Kyoto, fighting continued in Yamashiro Province. Most of the province had fallen under the control of one of the Ōnin War's factions, the so-called "western camp". However, peasants loyal to another faction, the "eastern camp", continued to resist southwest of Kyoto. In 1480, the "western camp" overran this holdout; the samurai consequently destroyed the fields of the local farmers. In addition, the province became affected by a civil war within the Hatakeyama clan. Hatakeyama Masanaga, the shogun's deputy (kanrei) and shugo of Yamashiro, battled his cousin Hatakeyama Yoshinari. The two mostly fought in the Kawachi and Yamato Provinces, but desired control of Yamashiro Province due to its worth in taxes, connections to the capital, and manpower. After some sporadic clashes in Yamashiro, the Hatakeyama cousins assembled their armies for a decisive battle in the province in 1485. Their troops fought for 63 days, even as the weather turned cold and rainy. Both sides had enlisted large numbers of warriors from Yamashiro Province, but these fighters became dicontent as combat dragged on and their homeland was devastated. The other locals also became agitated, and a series of uprisings and protests erupted. Armed peasants seized control of the province's southern areas and once again invaded the capital to demand debt cancellations. Peasants around Nara threatened to relocate en masse. Their livelihood affected by the blockade of roads due to the Hatakeyama civil war, local cart drivers protested for the removal of toll barriers between Kyoto and Nara as well as debt cancellations.

=== Yamashiro ikki rule ===
In December 1485, "local barons" and samurai from Yamashiro Province's southern districts met at the village of Kami Koma. After agreeing to form a council, the group paraded to the Iwashimizu Hachimangū shrine to exchange vows to uphold their agreements. This event attracted the attention of peasants from across Yamashiro Province who subsequently went en masse to the shrine to observe and attend the meeting. With such a large crowd gathered, those present agreed to form an ikki representing the entire province. The locals demanded the withdrawal of the feuding Hatakeyama armies, the restoration of the governance by local landholders, and the removal of recently established toll barriers. The demands were worded as an unconditional ultimatum, making threats of violence toward the Hatakeyama forces. The revolt was mainly motivated by the chaos and suffering which had been caused by the infighting warlords. A few days later, the samurai armies withdrew from the province. Historian Mary Elizabeth Berry speculated that the Hatakeyama retreated due to the exhaustion of their forces, the threats by the ikki, or because some of the ikki members were former Hatakeyama supporters without whom a continued campaign would have been impossible. Historian Pierre François Souyri regarded the mass desertion of local warriors from both armies as the main reason for the Hatakeyama forces' retreat.

The governance of the Yamashiro ikki was decided during a meeting at Byōdō-in (pictured 2016)

Encouraged by this success, local meetings of peasants and jizamurai were organized across southern Yamashiro Province. Eventually, the samurai members of the ikki met again at Byōdō-in in February 1486, occupying this traditionally aristocratic temple for ten days. They agreed to assume power in the province, and selected 36 individuals to form a government. In May, the ikki magistrates seized full control in the province by declaring that half of the local taxes to external proprietors would be withheld, with the exception of three shrines. This development was closely monitored by the government in Kyoto: on one side, the uprising had driven away the destructive Hatakeyama armies, but the confiscation of taxes was a prerogative traditionally held by the shogunate. Intending to restore his full control over the province, the shogun appointed Ise Sadaroku as new sugo of Yamashiro. However, the ikki assembly rejected the appointment and continued to factually defy the authority of Kyoto. Historian Ishida Yoshihito argued that the takeover by the ikki was facilitated with de facto support by the powerful politician Hosokawa Masamoto; according to his view, the Yamashiro ikki governed the area on Hosokawa's behalf and with his protection, shielding it from reprisals by other samurai or the shogun.

Despite the success of their uprising and the continued existence of the ikki, Yamashiro Province's jizamurai started to clash with each other. They consequently requested support by the external warlords, and also fought on the latter's behalf in other provinces. The province's ikki, sometimes joined by urban residents of Kyoto, also repeatedly invaded the capital from 1486, demanding debt reductions, sometimes occupying or burning districts of the city. Conflicts also emerged between the confederacy's samurai and peasants. The latter began to withdraw their support, threatening the confederacy's finances. This forced the ikki leading council (which was composed of samurai) to reestablish tolls to finance the confederacy's defenses and government. However, this decision provoked a violent peasant revolt against the ikki in 1492. After a rule of eight years, the Yamashiro ikki finally collapsed in 1493 when the shogunate organized a campaign to regain the province. The invasion was mainly carried out by outsider samurai who wanted to take the province for themselves. As they were effectively caught between this invasion and the growing opposition of the local peasants, the confederacy's samurai mostly opted to yield to the shogunate and accepted Ise Sadaroku as the shugo. With its leadership having almost completely defected, the confederacy collapsed. The ikki members who resisted were ruthlessly crushed, and the last rebel outpost was turned into "a dead place".

=== Aftermath and analysis ===
Even though the Yamashiro uprising had formally been suppressed, the province remained outside the control of the major warlords. It was not subject to military taxes raised in other parts of Japan, and remained "a breeding ground for uprisings against brokers and toll barriers". The estate structure established by the Yamashiro ikki also survived. Lesser ikki protests continued in Yamashiro Province on an almost yearly basis until 1511.

The Yamashiro ikki was part of a wider tendency of local uprisings which involved jizamurai and opposed both shugo as well as their vassals. As they were a direct challenge of the traditional hierarchies and societal organization, the ikki were often crushed with uncharacteristic violence by the samurai warlords.

== Organization ==
Formally, the Yamashiro ikki was a kuni or sokoku ikki, a coalition of warrior kokujin ikki and village do ikki. It included men aged 15 to 60 who mainly originated from southern Yamashiro Province. The ikki had its own constitution, called the "Rules and Laws of the Province", which was formulated during the Byōdō-in meeting in 1486. However, the Yamashiro ikki was a horizontal alliance, not a united government, as the warriors and villagers did not form one ruling body. The 36 men who formed the provincial government were kokujin lords and acted as the representatives of the local samurai. Three members of this group served as magistrates in rotation each month. The decisions of this government were carried out by the village councils which were responsible for the day-to-day governing. This meant that the villages ultimately sustained the kokujin lords' rule. As a result, historian Miura Hiroyuki called the Yamashiro ikki the "people's parliament of the Warring States period". Accordingly, the ikki began to break down once the peasants and 36-men council could no longer agree on the governance.

The Yamashiro ikki returned estates to the direct management of their owners and prohibited new tax barriers. Several aristocrats and abbots based in Kyoto initially responded positively to this development, sending inspectors to survey their estates in the ikki-held area. The monthly magistrates also took responsibility for judicial affairs, presiding over land disputes and at least one murder trial.

Researcher Carol R. Tsang stated that historians attribute the failure of the ikki to resist attacks in 1493 to the organization's unwieldiness. In contrast, Ishida Yoshihito believed that the defeat of the ikki was the result of their alleged protector, Hosokawa Masamoto, being distracted at the time due to his involvement in a coup d'état. Based on the contemporary chronicles' reports on the ikki's now-lost constitution, Souyri instead argued that the Yamashiro uprising –though initially supported by the local peasants– was mainly an attempt by the regional low-ranking samurai to seize power for themselves. Accordingly, their interests did not always align with those of the peasantry, and when the latter became "uncooperative", the entire ikki failed.
