= Hana no Ran =

- Written by: Shinichi Ichikawa
- Starring: Yoshiko Mita; Ichikawa Danjūrō XII; Eiji Okuda; Masao Kusakari; Nomura Mansai; Takako Matsu; Ichikawa Shinnosuke VII; Shirō Sano; Masahiro Matsuoka; Sachiko Kobayashi; Yoshie Taira; Toshiya Nagasawa; Isao Bitō; Hiroshi Katsuno; Hiroshi Fujioka; Isao Natsuyagi; Rino Katase; Fumi Dan; Kōji Yakusho; Matsumoto Kōshirō IX; Yorozuya Kinnosuke; Machiko Kyō
- Narrated by: Yoshiko Mita
- Theme music composer: Naoto Ōtomo
- Opening theme: NHK Symphony Orchestra
- Composer: Shigeaki Saegusa
- Country of origin: Japan
- Original language: Japanese
- No. of episodes: 37

Production
- Running time: 37 x 45 minutes

Original release
- Network: NHK
- Release: 3 April – 11 December 1994

Hana no Ran (花の乱) was the 33rd Taiga drama to be broadcast on the NHK network in Japan. It premiered on 3 April 1994 and its finale aired on 25 December of the same year.

== Plot ==
The story takes place during the Muromachi period of Japan, in the midst of the Ōnin War. The main character in the series is Hino Tomiko, a historical figure with a bad reputation because of her actions to rebuild Kyoto after the Ōnin War.

== Cast ==
Hino and Ashikaga

- Hino Tomiko: Yoshiko Mita
  - Young Tomiko: Takako Matsu
- Ashikaga Yoshimasa: Ichikawa Danjūrō XII
  - Young Yoshimasa: Ichikawa Shinnosuke VII
- Hino Shigeko: Machiko Kyō
- Hino Katsumitsu: Masao Kusakari
- Hino Mitsuko: Yoshie Taira
- Ashikaga Yoshimi: Shirō Sano
- Ashikaga Yoshiki: Takao Osawa

Hosokawa

- Hosokawa Katsumoto: Nomura Mansai

Yamana

- Yamana Sōzen: Yorozuya Kinnosuke

Imperial Court

- Emperor Go-Hanazono: Shun Ōide
- Ichijō Kaneyoshi: Taketoshi Naito
- Nijō Mochimichi: Yū Fujiki

Others

- Zenami: Junkichi Orimoto
- Ōuchi Masahiro: Hiroshi Fujioka
- Ikkyū: Eiji Okuda
- Ibuki Saburō Nobutsuna: Kōji Yakusho
- Shuten-dōji: Matsumoto Kōshirō IX
- Kenke Uehara: Kotaro Tanaka
- Aka Oni: Strong Kongo

== Ratings ==
The series, which only managed a 14.1% audience share during its run and peaking at 18.3% as its highest, had the notorious reputation of being the lowest-rated Taiga drama series in the franchise's history until it was surpassed by Taira no Kiyomori in 2012. Many blame the dark premises, the mysteries surrounding Hino Tomiko's family history, confusing disputes between her and Ashikaga Yoshimasa, and befuddling love scenes as the reasons why the drama failed.
