= Yamashiro Province =

Former province of Japan

Map of Japanese provinces (1868) with Yamashiro Province highlighted

Yamashiro Province (山城国, Yamashiro no Kuni; Japanese pronunciation: [jä̀.mä́.ɕì.ɾò̞ (nò̞ kɯ̈̀.ɲ̟ì), -ɕí.ɾó̞ (nó̞ kɯ̈́.ɲ̟í), -ɕí.ɾó̞ (nò̞ kɯ̈̀.ɲ̟ì)]) was a province of Japan, located in Kinai. It overlaps the southern part of modern Kyoto Prefecture on Honshū. Aliases include Jōshū (城州), the rare Sanshū (山州), and Yōshū (雍州). It is classified as an upper province in the Engishiki.

Yamashiro Province included Kyoto itself, as in 794 AD Yamashiro became the seat of the imperial court, and, during the Muromachi period, was the seat of the Ashikaga shogunate as well. The capital remained in Yamashiro until its de facto move to Tokyo in the 1870s.

== History ==
"Yamashiro" was formerly written with the characters meaning "mountain" (山) and "era" (代); in the 7th century, there were things built listing the name of the province with the characters for "mountain" and "ridge"/"back" (山背国). On 4 December 794 (8 Shimotsuki, 13th year of Enryaku), at the time of the establishment of Heian-kyō, because Emperor Kanmu made his new capital utilize the surroundings as natural fortification, the character for shiro was finally changed to "castle" (山城国). Later shiro from the province name replaced the older ki as the Japanese reading for the character 城.

Just from Nara period writings, it is apparent that the "area" (山代国) and "ridge" (山背国) listings coexisted.

The provincial capital, according to the Wamyō Ruijushō, was Kaya Imperial Villa (河陽離宮, Kaya Rikyū).

In the Shūgaishō, Otokuni District is mentioned as the seat, as well as in the Setsuyōshū.

As for the shugo's mansion, at first, Yamashiro Province shugo and Kyoto shugo were concurrent posts, so the Kyoto shugo's kogeninmansion had to be allotted. Afterwards, the Rokuhara Tandai came to be an additional post, and that became the shugo as well. In the Muromachi period, Yamashiro Province was divided with the Uji River as the border into two districts, and each came to be assigned a shugo, so one shugo resided in Uji Makishima, whereas the other resided in various places around Yodo and such.

A European geographical dictionary published in 1697, well into the Tokugawa period, describes "Yamaxiro" as a "kingdom in Japan," with "Meaco" (Miyako, i.e. Kyoto) as its "capital."

== Temples ==
The provincial temples included those where the resident chief priest was a man, and those where it was a woman in Sōraku District. Kuni no Miya's Daigokuden was made a temple in 746. It was destroyed by fire in 882, and the rebuilding afterwards would decline. In the Kamakura period, it came to be a branch temple of Byōdō-in. The location is in modern Kizugawa city, coinciding with Kamo. In 1925, a large number of old tiles were excavated near the provincial temple, and it is thought that these once belonged to the convent.

The Kamo Shrines—the Kamigamo Shrine in the Kita ward of Kyoto and the Shimogamo Shrine in Sakyō ward—were designated as the two chief Shinto shrines (ichinomiya) of Yamashiro province.

Yamashiro's ichinomiya designation differed from other provinces', likely due to the Jingi-kan; from nearly the end of the 11th century, when the primary shrines were being established in each of the various provinces, it is thought that in Kinai, it was decided on after the turn on the 12th century. There were no ninomiya (secondary shrines). It is unknown whether there were any sōja.

== Historical districts ==
- Kyoto Prefecture
  - Otokuni District (乙訓郡, Otokuni-gun)
  - Kadono District (葛野郡, Kadono-gun) - dissolved
  - Otagi District (愛宕郡, Otagi-gun) - dissolved
  - Kii District (紀伊郡, Kii-gun) - dissolved
  - Uji District (宇治郡, Uji-gun) - dissolved
  - Kuse District (久世郡, Kuse-gun)
  - Tsuzuki District (綴喜郡, Tsuzuki-gun)
  - Sōraku District (相楽郡, Sōraku-gun)

== Shugo ==
=== Kamakura Shogunate ===
- –1221 – concurrent post with Kyoto shugo
- 1221–1333 – concurrent post with Rokuhara Tandai

=== Muromachi Shogunate ===
- 1353–1384 – concurrent post with Samurai-dokoro
- 1385–1386 – Yamana Ujikiyo
- 1389 – Akamatsu Yoshinori
- 1389–1390 – Yamana Ujikiyo
- 1390–1391 – Akamatsu Yoshinori
- 1391 – Yamana Ujikiyo
- 1392–1394 – Hatakeyama Motokuni
- 1394–1399 – Ketsushiro Mandō
- 1399 – Kyōgoku Takanori
- 1399–1402 – Ketsushiro Mandō
- 1402–1403 – Hatakeyama Motokuni
- 1404–1416 – Takashi Morohide
- 1418–1421 – Isshiki Yoshitsura
- 1421–1423 – Kyōgoku Takakazu
- 1424–1428 – Kyōgoku Mochimitsu
- 1428–1433 – Hatakeyama Mitsuie
- 1433–1434 – Hatakeyama Mochikuni
- 1434–1436 – Isshiki Yoshitsura
- 1436–1439 – Akamatsu Mitsusuke
- 1440–1441 – Yamana Mochitoyo
- 1441–1447 – Kyōgoku Mochikiyo
- 1447–1449 – Isshiki Norichika
- 1450–1455 – Hatakeyama Mochikuni
- 1455–1460 – Hatakeyama Yoshinari
- 1460–1463 – Hatakeyama Masanaga
- 1464–1468 – Yamana Koretoyo
- 1474–1478 – Yamana Masatoyo
- 1478–1483 – Hatakeyama Masanaga
- 1483–1486 – Akamatsu Masanori
- 1486–1490 – Ise Sadamune
- 1493–1507 – Ise Sadamichi
- 1508–1518 – Ōuchi Yoshioki
- 1518–1531 – Hosokawa Takakuni
- 1532–1549 – Hosokawa Harumoto

== Kami of Yamashiro ==
- Fujiwara no Muneyo
- Obata Toramori
- Saitō Dōsan
- Araki Ujitsuna
- Jushii-ge Matsunaga Hisahide
- Ryūzōji Takanobu
- Jugoi-ge Naoe Kanetsugu(from 1583)
- Jugoi-ge Toki Sadamasa(from 1593)
- Jugoi-ge Toki Sadayoshi
- Jugoi-ge Takenokoshi Masanobu (from 1611)
- Jugoi-ge Toki Yoriyuki (from 1624)
- Jugoi-ge Takenokoshi Masaharu
- Jugoi-ge Takenokoshi Masateru
- Jugoi-ge Takenokoshi Masatake
- Jugoi-ge Takenokoshi Katsuoki
- Takenokoshi Mutsumura
- Jugoi-ge Takenokoshi Masasada
- Jugoi-ge Nagai Naosuke
- Jugoi-ge Nagai Naonori

== See also ==
- List of Provinces of Japan
- Yamashiro ikki
- Capital of Japan
- Shi sakai
- IJN battleship Yamashiro
