= Michiko Nagai =

Japanese writer (1925–2023)

Michiko Nagai (永井路子, Nagai Michiko); (March 31, 1925 – January 27, 2023) was a Japanese historical fiction writer. Her real name is Hiroko Kuroita (黒板擴子, Kuroita Hiroko).

== Biography ==
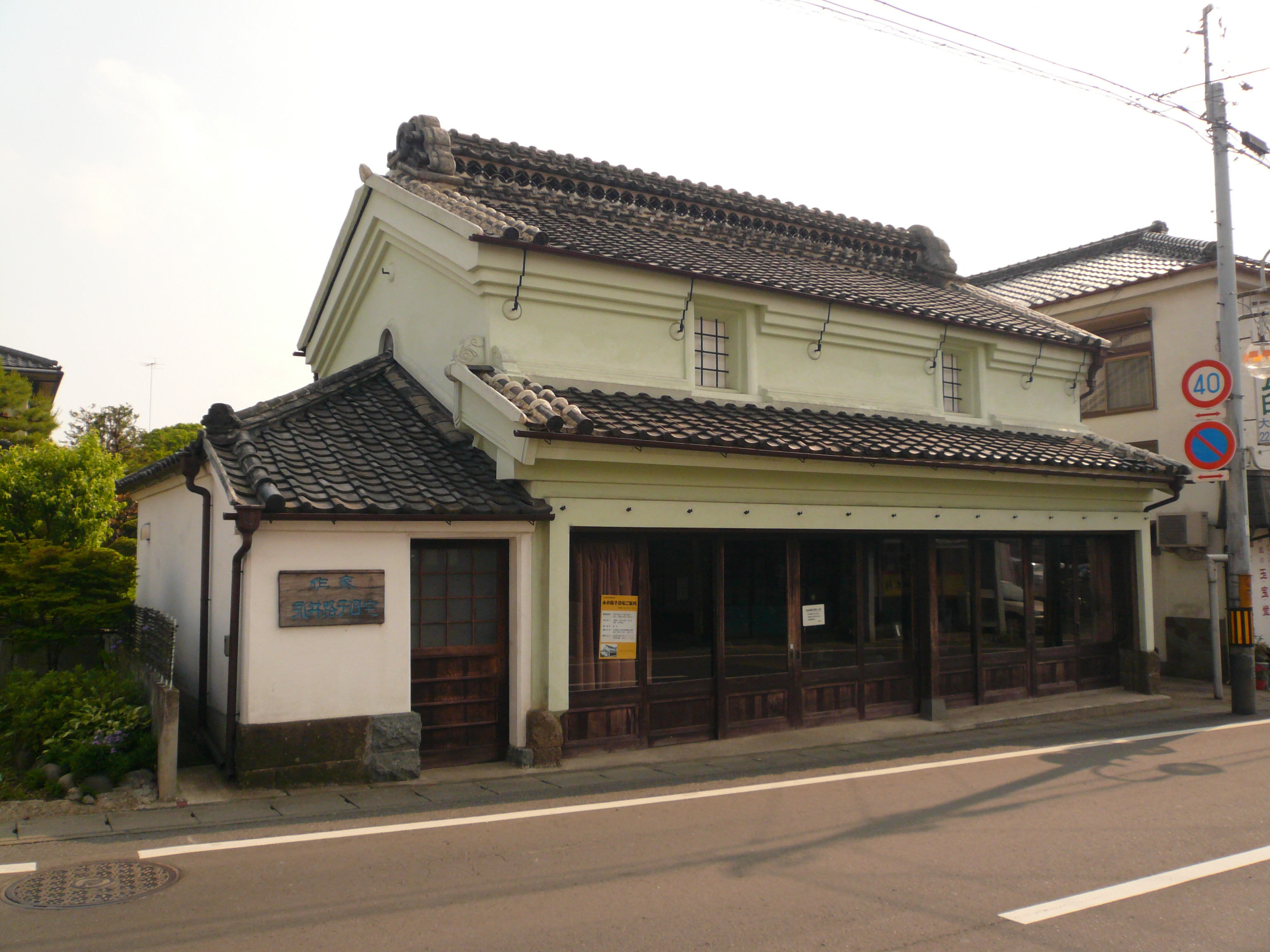
A former house of Michiko Nagai (Koga, Ibaraki)

Born on March 31, 1925, in the Hongō ward of Tokyo to Kiyonori Kurushima (来島清徳, Kurushima Kiyonori) and singer Tomoko Nagai (永井智子, Nagai Tomoko), Nagai graduated from the Tokyo Women's University with a degree in Japanese literature in 1944. She also studied economic history at the University of Tokyo from 1947 to 1948. After her marriage to Nobuo Kuroita, the son of historian Kuroita Katsumi, she went to work as an editor for the publishing company Shogakukan. Still, she began to write her own stories with historical settings on the side.

In 1952, she submitted her debut work, Sanjoin ki ("History of Lady Sanjo"), to the Sunday Mainichi, where it was awarded second place in that publication's 30th anniversary commemorative edition. This encouraged her to pursue a career in literature full-time, winning the prestigious Naoki Award in 1964, the 21st Women's Culture Award in 1982, the 32nd Kikuchi Kan Prize in 1984, and the Yoshikawa Eiji Literary Award.

Nagai was noted for historical novels reassessing the role of women in Japanese history, deviating from the traditional narrative. She has been praised for combining historical accuracy with translating her character's emotions into modern terms. In Hōjō Masako, she countered the popular image of Minamoto no Yoritomo's jealous, power-grasping wife Hōjō Masako (1157–1225) with a more human, sympathetic personality. Her novel was the basis for a yearlong television drama on the Japanese government television network NHK in 1979.

Likewise, in Gin no yakata ("Silver Mansion," 1980), she rehabilitated the image of Hino Tomiko (1440–1496), wife of the ineffectual shōgun Ashikaga Yoshimasa. Historically scorned as an "evil money-grubbing woman" who dragged the country into war, Nagai's portrayal is of a woman who is the savior of the government and skilled at finance and politics. However, her writing was not entirely on the role of women. In 1997, NHK aired a year-long historical drama in 50 episodes, Mōri Motonari, on the life of the Sengoku-period daimyō, based on Nagai's book of the same name.

Nagai died on January 27, 2023, at the age of 97.

== Selected works ==
- Enkan (炎環) (1964)
- Nagasaki hankachō (長崎犯科帳) (1965)
- Emaki (絵巻) (1966)
- Shukumei no tenshukaku (宿命の天守閣) (1967)
- Kamakura no tera (鎌倉の寺) (1967
- Hōjō Masako (北条政子) (1969)
- Nihon sūpāredī monogatari (日本スーパーレディー物語) (1969)
- Shin konjaku monogatari (新今昔物語) (1971)
- Ōja no tsuma: Hideyoshi no tsuma Onene (王者の妻－秀吉の妻おねね) (1971)
- Shunaru jūjika (朱なる十字架) (1971)
- Heike monogatari no josei tachi (平家物語の女性たち) (1972)
- Rekishi o sawagaseta onna tachi: gaikoku hen (歴史をさわがせた女たち 外国篇) (1972)
- Yuki no hono'o (雪の炎) (1972)
- Kazutoyo no tsuma (一豊の妻) (1972)
- Tabi suru nyo'nin (旅する女人) (1972)
- Ai no katachi: koten ni ikiru onna tachi (愛のかたち 古典に生きる女たち) (1972)
- Man'yō koiuta: nihonjin ni totte "ai suru" to wa (万葉恋歌 日本人にとって「愛する」とは) (1972)
- Onna no kai to ikikata: joseishi tanbō (女の愛と生き方 女性史探訪) (1972)

== See also ==
- Japanese literature
- List of Japanese authors

== Bibliography ==
- Schierbeck, Sachiko Shibata; Edelstein, Marlene R. (1994). Japanese Women Novelists in the 20th Century: 104 Biographies, 1900–1993. Museum Tusculanum Press. ISBN 87-7289-268-4.
