= Hino Tomiko =

Japanese noble (1440–1496)

Ōmidaidokoro 日野 富子 Hino Tomiko
- Born: 1440
- Died: 30 June 1496 (aged 55–56)
- Known for: One of Leaders of the Ōnin War
- Spouse: Ashikaga Yoshimasa
- Children: Ashikaga Yoshihisa
- Parents: Hino Shigemasa (father); Kitakoji Naeko (mother)
- Relatives: Hino clan Ashikaga shogunate

Hino Tomiko (日野 富子; 1440 – June 30, 1496) was a prominent figure during the Muromachi period and the beginning of the Sengoku period. She was daughter to Hino Shigemasa and was the official wife of Ashikaga Yoshimasa, the eighth shōgun of the Ashikaga shogunate (at first Tomiko was betrothed to Ashikaga Yoshikatsu the seventh shōgun but Yoshikatsu died at the age of 10), and the mother of Ashikaga Yoshihisa, the ninth shōgun. Her efforts during the succession dispute are seen as one of the causes of the Ōnin War and led to the beginning of the Sengoku period.

== Early life ==
Hino Tomiko was born into the Hino family, a powerful family whose women became consorts to many previous Shoguns. These familial connections enhanced the Hino's power to control the Shogunate Court. Tomiko played an important role in strengthening the Hino family's relationship with the Shogunate and enabling it to grow ever more powerful. When Tomiko's social and political status rose after her marriage to Ashikaga Yoshimasa, she decided to stay active in the shogunal government. She had her first child on the ninth day of the first month of 1459, however, the child died the same day. Later she placed the blame for the child's death on Yoshimasa's wet nurse, Imamairi no Tsubone, who was later exiled to Oki Island on Lake Biwa, where she committed suicide.

== Ōnin War ==
In 1460, Yoshimasa decided to abdicate his position as Shogun. However, since Tomiko had not given birth to an heir, Yoshimasa convinced his younger brother Ashikaga Yoshimi to succeed him, first in office and then gradually claiming the title of Shogun. Tomiko was against it, although at the time she had no influence to contest Yoshimi's appointment. She stood at war with the shogunate officers until she gave birth to the future Ashikaga Yoshihisa, becoming the mother of the future shogun. Tomiko went looking for military support to make sure the next successor was from her family lineage. She got support from the Ouchi, Hatakeyama, Shiba and others clans.

With her standing in the Hino family, and backed by Yamana Sozen, two factions developed in the capital, the Hosokawa clan, who supported the newly appointed Shogun, Yoshimi, and the Yamana clan, who supported the succession of Yoshihisa. Thus, Tomiko's desire to place her son in line for the succession is said to have led to the Ōnin War.

Tomiko supported the Eastern Army led by Hosokawa Katsumoto. She lent large sums of money to daimyos on both sides, accumulating a fortune estimated at 60 billion yen in today's value. Around 1471, rumors spread about a secret affair between Tomiko and Emperor Go-Tsuchimikado, who was taking refuge in the Muromachi Tei. This contributed to the deterioration of her relationship with Yoshimasa.

In 1473, after the deaths of Yamana Sozen and Hosokawa Katsumoto, and Yoshimasa's retirement, Tomiko effectively became the leader of the shogunate.

== After the Onin War ==
After the end of the Onin War in 1477, Tomiko faced a peasant uprising (Tokusei Ikki) in Kyoto due to her efforts to rebuild the city's infrastructure by imposing tolls at the seven city gates (Kyoto Shichikoukan). In response to the uprising, she suppressed the revolt and immediately reinstated the tolls. Despite these actions, both the common people and aristocrats resented her.

Yoshimasa, growing distant from Tomiko, moved to Ise Sadamune's residence in 1483, becoming indulgent in alcohol. This led to a temporary loss of power for Tomiko. However, in 1489, Yoshimasa's sudden death during the campaign against the Rokkaku clan shifted the balance of power. Tomiko, along with her brother-in-law, Ashikaga Yoshizumi (formerly known as Ashikaga Yoshihisa), orchestrated the ascension of Yoshizumi as the 11th shogun.

In 1489, Yoshihisa died while making an expedition to subdue Rokkaku Takayori, which was followed by Yoshimasa's death. So Ashikaga Yoshitane, who was the son of Yoshimi and Tomiko's younger sister, was nominated for the shogun by Tomiko. But Yoshimi rebelled against Tomiko's decision. He demolished Tomiko's residence and seized her territory. After Yoshimi's death, Yoshiki also rebelled against Tomiko, following his late father's will. In 1493, however, Tomiko carried out a coup with the help of Hosokawa Masamoto, dethroning Yoshiki and instead installing Ashikaga Yoshizumi, who was Yoshimasa's nephew and the son of Ashikaga Masatomo, the Horigoe-Kubo as shogun. But her life ended in 1496. She died at the age of 57.

== In popular culture ==
- She has been the subject of novels by Ryōtarō Shiba and Michiko Nagai.
- She was also the subject of a novel named Fuyu No Rakijatsu by Eri Kawamaru.
- Hino Tomiko was a central character in the NHK Taiga drama Hana no Ran.

== See also ==
- Onna-bugeisha
- List of female castellans in Japan
