= Yoshiko Mita =

Japanese actress (born 1941)

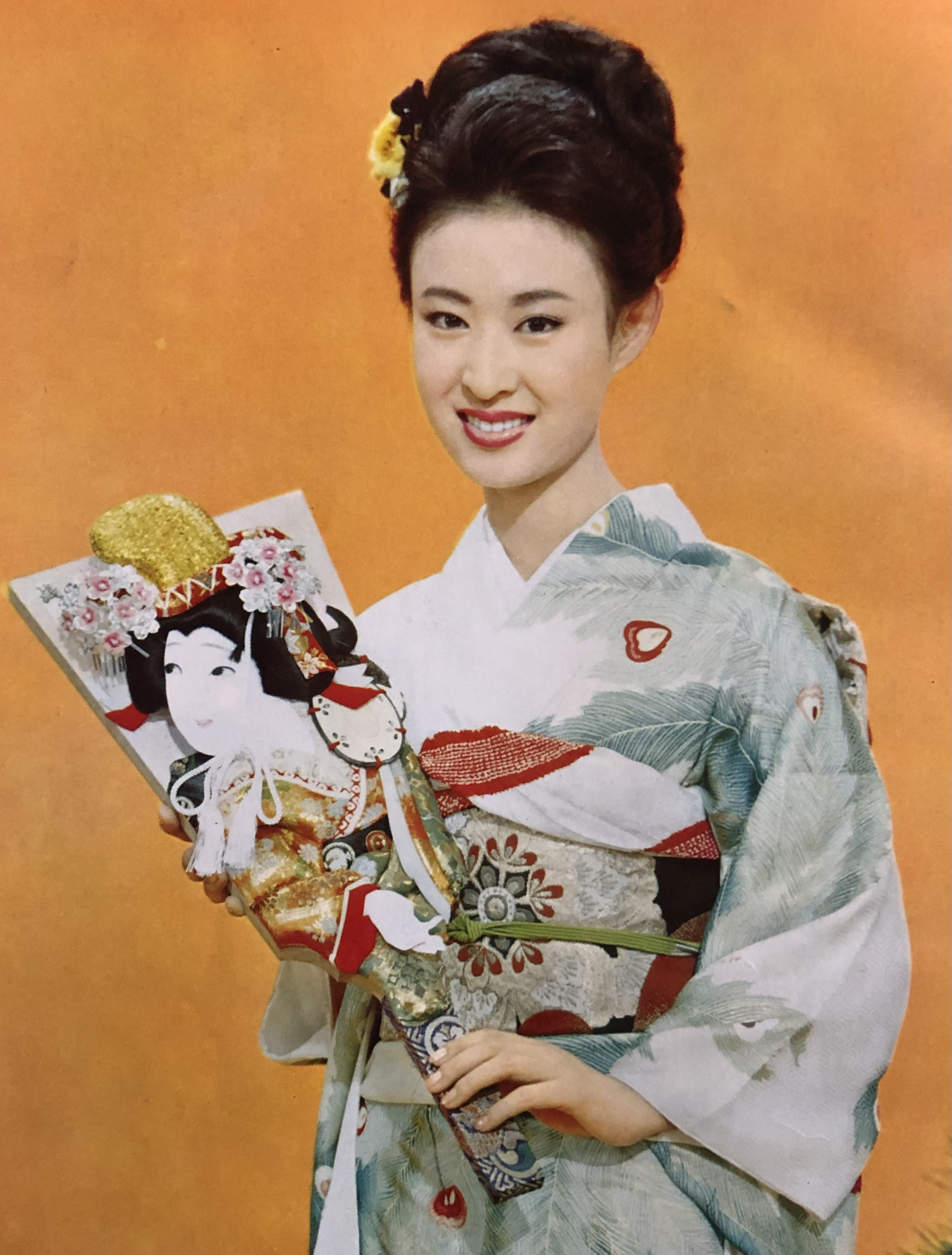
- Born: October 8, 1941 (age 85); Osaka, Japan
- Occupation: Actress
- Years active: 1960–present

Yoshiko Mita (三田佳子, Mita Yoshiko) (born October 8, 1941) is a Japanese actress. Born in the city of Osaka, she graduated from Joshibi High School of Art and Design in Suginami, Tokyo. In 1960, she was hired by Toei and made her acting debut. She remained with Toei until 1967, then became free to appear in films, on television, and on the stage. Her performance in the film W's Tragedy (1984) earned the Japan Academy Prize for Best Supporting Actress in 1986. From 1991 to 1994, she topped Japan's official list of taxpayers in the Actors and Celebrities category.

Yoshiko appears in both contemporary and jidaigeki roles. She won the award for best actress at the 30th and at the 35th Blue Ribbon Awards.

With husband Yasuo Takahashi she has two sons, both actors.

== Selected filmography ==
=== Film ===
- Ōshō (1962)
- League of Gangsters (1963), Akiko
- Bushidō zankoku monogatari (1963)
- Same (1964) with Kinnosuke Nakamura
- Kuruwa Sodachi (1964)
- Yojōhan monogatari: Shōfu shino (1966)
- Zatoichi kenka-daiko (1968)
- Tsuma to onna no aida (1976)
- The Fall of Ako Castle (1978)
- A Ilha dos Amores (1982)
- The Go Masters (1983)
- W's Tragedy (1984)
- Haru no Kane (1985)
- Michi (1986)
- Tora-san's Salad-Day Memorial (1988)
- Rikyu (1989), Riki, the wife of Sen no Rikyū
- Tōki Rakujitsu (1992)
- Umineko (2004)
- Diancie and the Cocoon of Destruction (2014), Xerneas (voice)
- The Actor (2016), Natsuko Matsumura
- The Promised Neverland (2020)
- The Three Sisters of Tenmasou Inn (2022), Reiko Zaizen
- The Women in the Lakes (2024), Matsue Ichishima
- Goodbye, My Loved Ones! (2026), Toyoko Kato

=== Television ===
- Taikōki (1965), Yodo-dono
- Kunitori Monogatari (1973), Miyoshino
- Kōgen e Irrashai (1976)
- Sekigahara (1981), Yodo-Dono
- Nyokei Kazoku (1984)
- Inochi (1986), Miki Takahara
- Hana no Ran (1994), Hino Tomiko
- Gekai Arimori Saeko (1990 and 1992)
- Ryōri no Tetsujin (Iron Chef) (1999), a judge in the show's final battle between Hiroyuki Sakai and Alain Passard
- Hana Moyu (2015), Sei
- The Return (2020)

== Commercials ==
- Ajinomoto
- Matsushita Electric
- Seino Transportation
- Lion Corporation
- Taisho Pharmaceutical

== Honours ==
- Kinuyo Tanaka Award (1987)
- Order of the Rising Sun, 4th Class, Gold Rays with Rosette (2014)
