= Hatakeyama Masanaga =

Japanese daimyō (1442–1493)

Hatakeyama Masanaga (畠山 政長; 1442 – June 9, 1493) was a daimyō of the Hatakeyama clan and, according to some accounts, invented the horo, a stiffened cloak used by messengers and bodyguards to improve their visibility on the battlefield, and to act as an arrow-catcher.

Masanaga is most well known for his disputes in 1467 with Hatakeyama Yoshinari over the position of Kanrei. This grew out of the larger conflict between Hosokawa Katsumoto and Yamana Sōzen, which escalated into the Ōnin War. Masanaga and Yoshinari were largely stalemated for much of this period, as Yamana and Hosokawa Katsumoto warned that the first to engage in battle within the capital would be declared a rebel. Becoming a "rebel" meant losing alliances as well as honor. Both were soon sucked into the larger war, however, and Hatakeyama Masanaga ended up fighting Ōuchi Masahiro, one of Yamana's generals.
