= Hatakeyama Yoshinari =

Japanese samurai and feudal lord

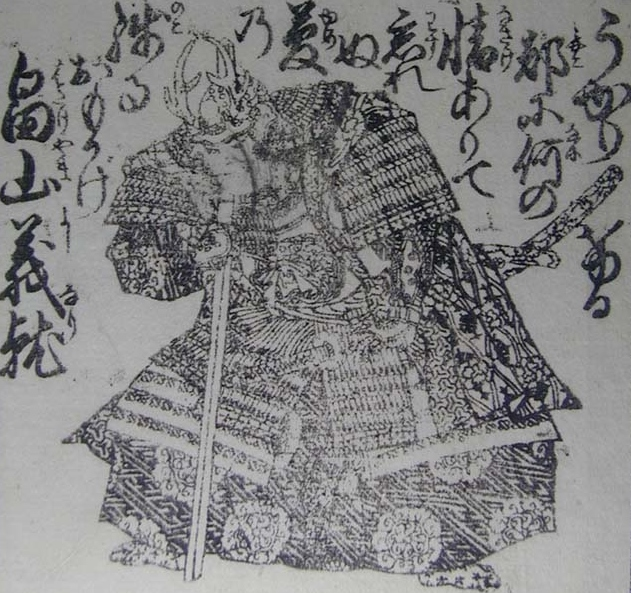
Hatakeyama Yoshinari

Hatakeyama Yoshinari (畠山 義就; 1437? – January 21, 1491) was a Japanese samurai and feudal lord (daimyō) of the Muromachi period (early 15th century), who is most known for his rivalry with Hatakeyama Masanaga over the position of Kanrei, or Shōgun's Deputy.

This rivalry grew out of the larger conflict between Hosokawa Katsumoto and Yamana Sōzen, which escalated into the Ōnin War. Masanaga and Yoshinari were largely stalemated for much of this period, as Yamana and Hosokawa Katsumoto warned that the first to engage in battle within the capital would be declared a rebel. Becoming a "rebel" meant losing alliances as well as honor.
