= Ōuchi Masahiro =

Ōuchi Masahiro (大内 政弘; September 18, 1446 – October 6, 1495) was a member of the Ōuchi clan and general in the Ōnin War, serving Yamana Sōzen.

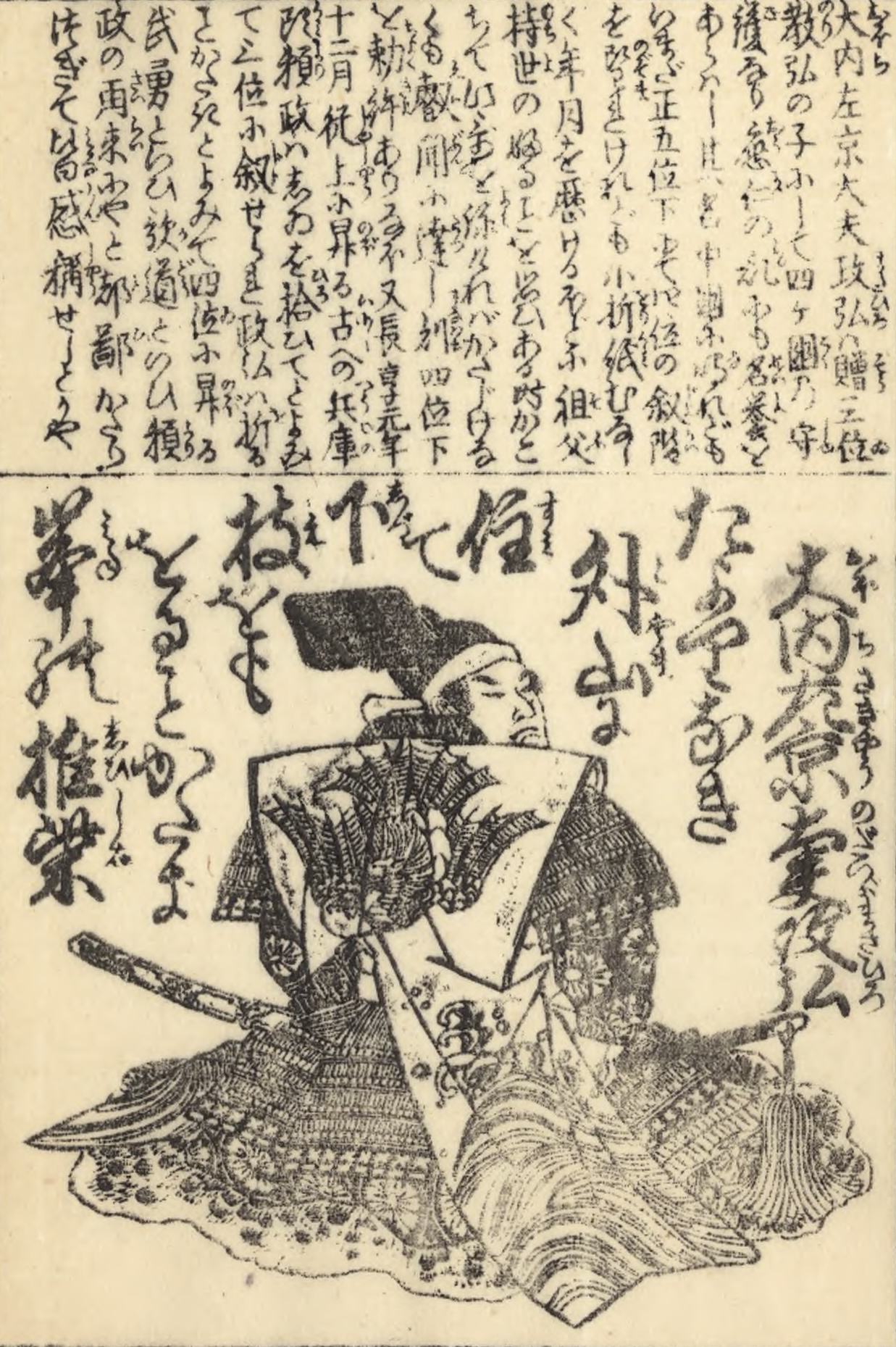
Portrait of Ōuchi Masahiro

He battled numerous times with Yamana's rival, Hosokawa Katsumoto, at one point commanding 20,000 men and 2,000 boats, moving his troops by land as well as by sea. These battles took place mostly in Kyoto, but also across the Hosokawa family's holdings, and other territories. In 1473, both Yamana and Hosokawa died, but Ōuchi refused to lay down his arms until the Shogunal succession was decided.

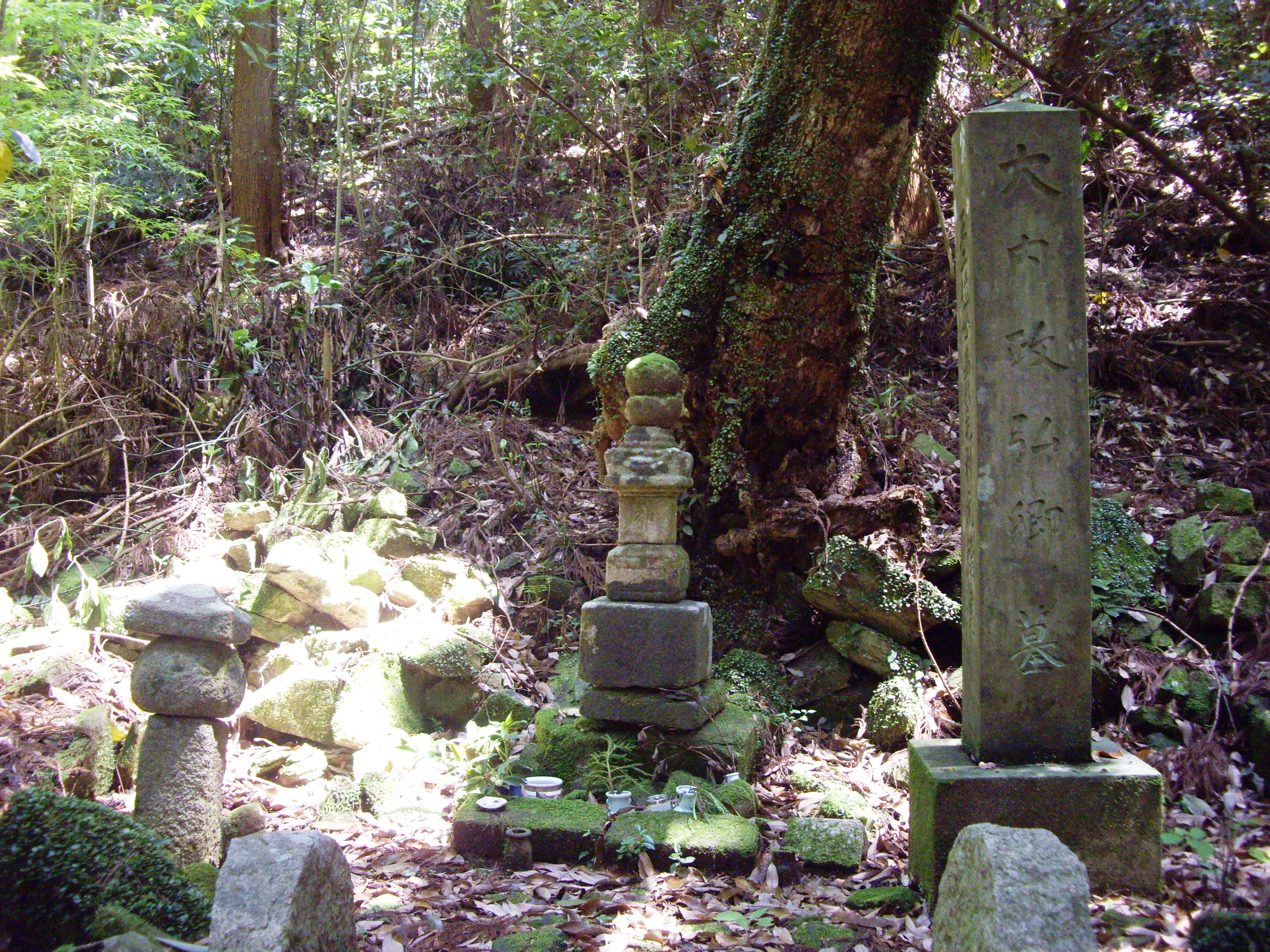
Grave of Ōuchi Masahiro

He even refused a direct order from the Shōgun himself. Finally in 1475, after most other daimyōs had submitted to the Shōgun's rule, Ōuchi did the same, and returned to his home in Kyoto. There, he destroyed his own home, and possibly the Shōgun's Nijō Palace as well, blaming it on ashigaru in his diary. Ōuchi then left the city, establishing himself in his family's ancestral domains of Yamaguchi and seeking to recreate the depth of Kyoto culture there. He decorated his castle lavishly with artwork imported from China and Korea, as well as Japanese art. He also invited a number of famous artists to his home, including Sesshū, who painted the Long Scroll (Chōkan) for him in 1486.
