= Ōnin War =

15th-century civil war in Japan

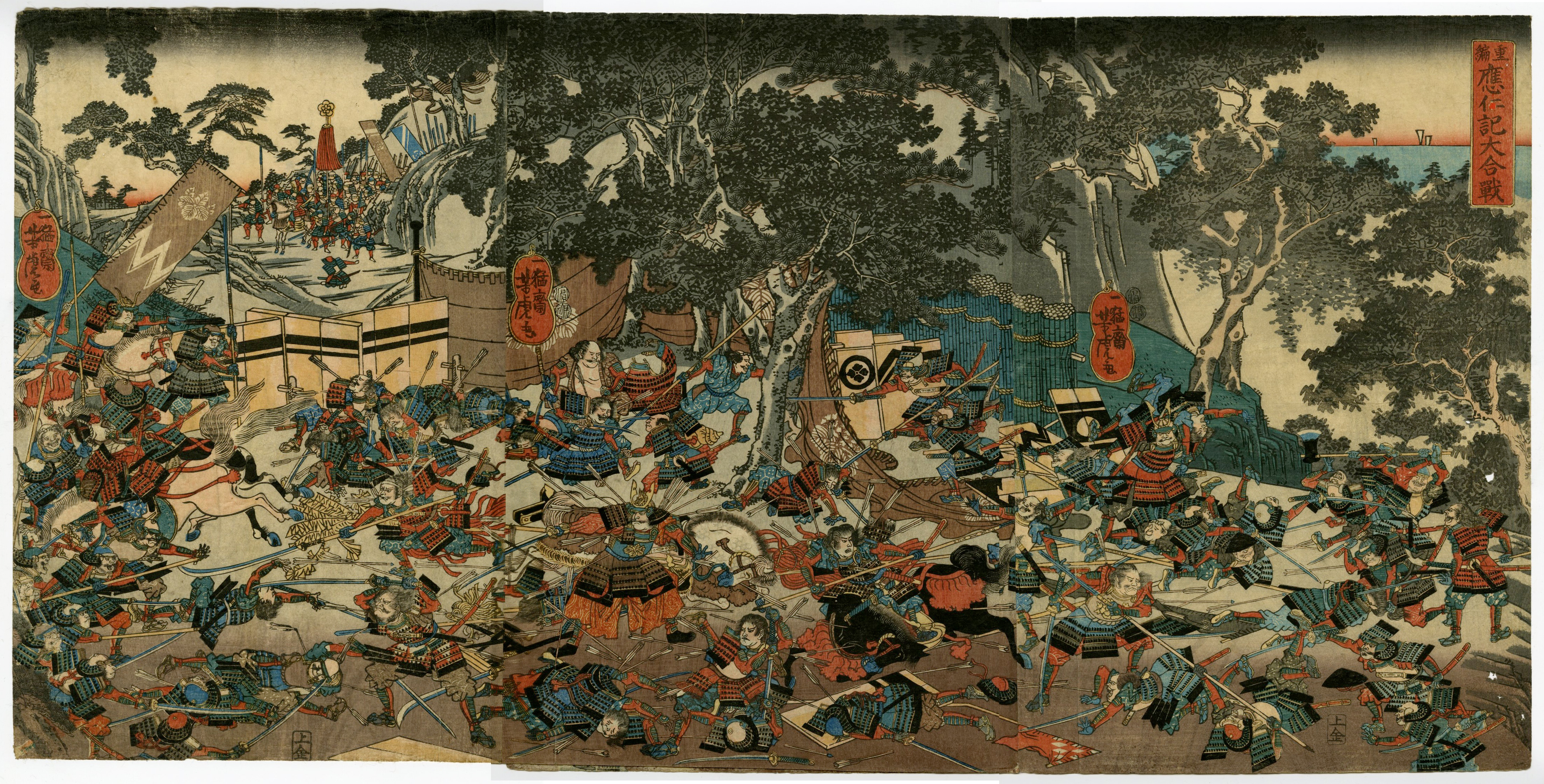
- 19th-century print by Utagawa Yoshitora depicting a battle
Date	1467–1477 (10 years)
Location	Throughout Japan, though most intense fighting in Kyoto and Yamashiro Province
Result	Hosokawa victory: both sides are militarily exhausted and the Ōuchi abandon Kyoto. Hosokawa clan gains control of the shogunate and Ashikaga Yoshihisa becomes shōgun; Most of Kyoto destroyed; Emergence of the Ikkō-ikki; Continuing civil war within the Hatakeyama clan; Disintegration of the power of the shogunate, beginning of the Sengoku period

Belligerents
Eastern Camp: Hosokawa clan; Hatakeyama clan (pro-Masanaga faction); Shiba clan (pro-Yoshitoshi faction); others	Western Camp: Yamana clan; Ōuchi clan; Hatakeyama clan (pro-Yoshinari faction); Shiba clan (pro-Yoshikado faction); others

Commanders and leaders
Hosokawa Katsumoto; Hatakeyama Masanaga; Shiba Yoshitoshi others	Yamana Sōzen; Ōuchi Masahiro; Hatakeyama Yoshinari; Shiba Yoshikado others

Strength
c. 160,000	c. 116,000

The Ōnin War (応仁の乱, Ōnin no Ran), also known as the Upheaval of Ōnin and Ōnin-Bunmei war, was a civil war that lasted from 1467 to 1477, during the Muromachi period in Japan. Ōnin refers to the Japanese era during which the war started; the war ended during the Bunmei era. A dispute between a high official, Hosokawa Katsumoto, and a regional lord, Yamana Sōzen, escalated into a nationwide civil war involving the Ashikaga shogunate and a number of daimyō (大名, feudal lords) in many regions of Japan.

The war initiated the Sengoku period, "the Warring States period." This period was a long, drawn-out struggle for domination by individual daimyō, resulting in a mass power struggle between the various houses to dominate the whole of Japan. The war was so destructive to Kyoto that its residents were said to refer to it simply as "the war" well into the twentieth century.

== Origin ==
The Ōnin conflict began as a controversy over who would succeed shōgun Ashikaga Yoshimasa. In 1464, Yoshimasa had no heir. He persuaded his younger brother, Ashikaga Yoshimi, to abandon the life of a monk, and named him heir. In 1465, the unanticipated birth of a son to Yoshimasa put these plans in question. The infant, Yoshihisa, led to a succession crisis with two competing factions. On one side was the shōgun and his brother, together with the shōgun's deputy, Hosokawa. On the other side was Yoshihisa's mother, Hino Tomiko, and her ally Yamana, who was the governor of several provinces.

The cause of the war is often attributed to the struggle to succeed the eighth shōgun, Ashikaga Yoshimasa, but in fact there were multiple causes. The real power of the Ashikaga shogunate was vested in a council of powerful daimyō, but the deaths of a number of influential daimyō and the intervention in politics of women close to the shōgun's entourage led to chaos in the shogunate, and from 1441 on, the masses demanded a virtue decree every few years and destroyed the sake stores and warehouses that were the source of the shogunate's funding. Under these circumstances, in addition to the conflicts over the succession of the shōgun, conflicts over the succession of the Hatakeyama clan and conflicts over the succession of the Shiba clan occurred simultaneously, all of which contributed to the war. According to the most popular theory, the main cause of the war was the struggle for succession between Hatakeyama Yoshinari and Hatakeyama Masanaga within the Hatakeyama clan, with the participation of Hosokawa Katsumoto, Yamana Sōzen, and other daimyō from various regions.

In 1467, these conflicts finally led to the Ōnin War between the Eastern Army, led by Hosokawa Katsumoto and including Hatakeyama Masanaga, Shiba Yoshitoshi, and Ashikaga Yoshimi, and the Western Army, led by Yamana Sōzen and including Hatakeyama Yoshinari, Shiba Yoshikado, and Ashikaga Yoshihisa.

At first, the Eastern Army supported Ashikaga Yoshimi and the Western Army supported Ashikaga Yoshihisa as the ninth shōgun. However, Yoshimi, who disliked war, fled to Ise to seek refuge with the Kitabatake clan, and fell out with Yoshimasa, the eighth shōgun. When the Western Army received Yoshimi in 1468, the Eastern Army came to support Yoshihisa. In other words, the successors supported by the Eastern and Western armies reversed within a year.

== Battles ==
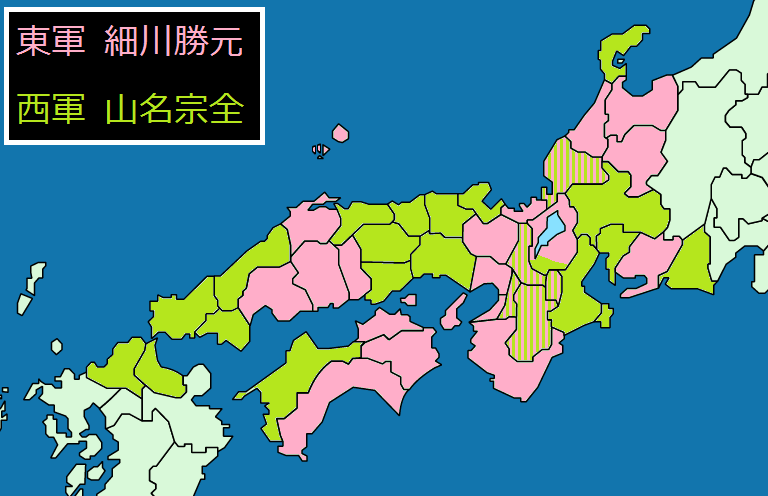
Situation in 1467. Areas loyal to or allied with Hosokawa Katsumoto in pink, areas loyal to or allied with Yamana Sōzen in light green.

"Just what, we must often ask, did the contenders want? I don't think they knew. Certainly, they understood the particular enmities and prizes that moved them. Surely, too, they perceived links between their immediate purposes and the deeper strains in every relationship of power and personal attachment. All else remained obscure."

— Mary Elizabeth Berry's reflection on the Ōnin War's chaotic nature

Hosokawa's Eastern Army of about 85,000 and Yamana's Western Army of about 80,000 were almost evenly matched when mobilized near Kyoto. The fighting started in March when a Hosokawa mansion was burned. Then in May 1467, a Yamana mansion was attacked. In July, according to Sansom, Yoshimasa appointed Hosokawa commanding general in an attempt to "chastise the rebel" Yamana. Sansom states "heavy fighting continued throughout July" and "several hundred large buildings were destroyed, and destruction continued day after day". Hosokawa was soon cornered in the northeast portion of Kyoto around his mansion, while Yamana controlled the south and west. Yamana received 20,000 reinforcements under Ōuchi Masahiro in September. However, Sansom states Hosokawa was able to bring the "sovereign and the abdicated Emperor" to the bakufu from the Emperor's Palace, before it was seized by Yamana with 50,000 men. Hosokawa then received Akamatsu troops as reinforcements. On 1 November, Yamana was able to capture the Shōkoku-ji after bribing a monk. Sansom states "The chronicles of the time paint a dreadful picture of the carnage", and "the two adversaries faced one another without action for the rest of the year".

Hosokawa attempted an attack on New Year's Day, and then again in April, but for the most part "the two armies now remained glaring at one another month after month". A central trench 10 feet (3 m) deep and 20 feet (6 m) wide separated the two armies. Several monasteries were burned, including the Tenryū-ji. Yoshimi went over to Yamana's side, which allowed Yoshimasa to name his son Yoshihisa as his heir in 1469. The war was no longer only a contest between Hosokawa and Yamana: it now also set Yoshimasa against his brother. Yoshimasa then had Emperor Go-Tsuchimikado strip Yoshimi of his court ranks and declare him a rebel.

Both Yamana Sōzen and Hosokawa Katsumoto died in 1473, and even then the war continued on, with neither side able to figure out how to end it. However, eventually the Yamana clan lost heart as the label of "rebel" was at last having some effect. Ōuchi Masahiro, one of the Yamana generals, eventually burned down his section of Kyoto and left the area on 17 December 1477.

Kyoto suffered so badly that, according to a local legend, people in the city used “the war” (この前の戦争) to mean the Ōnin War until well into the 20th century.

As shōgun, Yoshimasa played little part in ending the war. He devoted his time to poetry readings and other cultural pursuits, and to planning Ginkaku-ji, the Silver Pavilion, which was meant to rival Kinkaku-ji, the Golden Pavilion built by his grandfather Ashikaga Yoshimitsu.

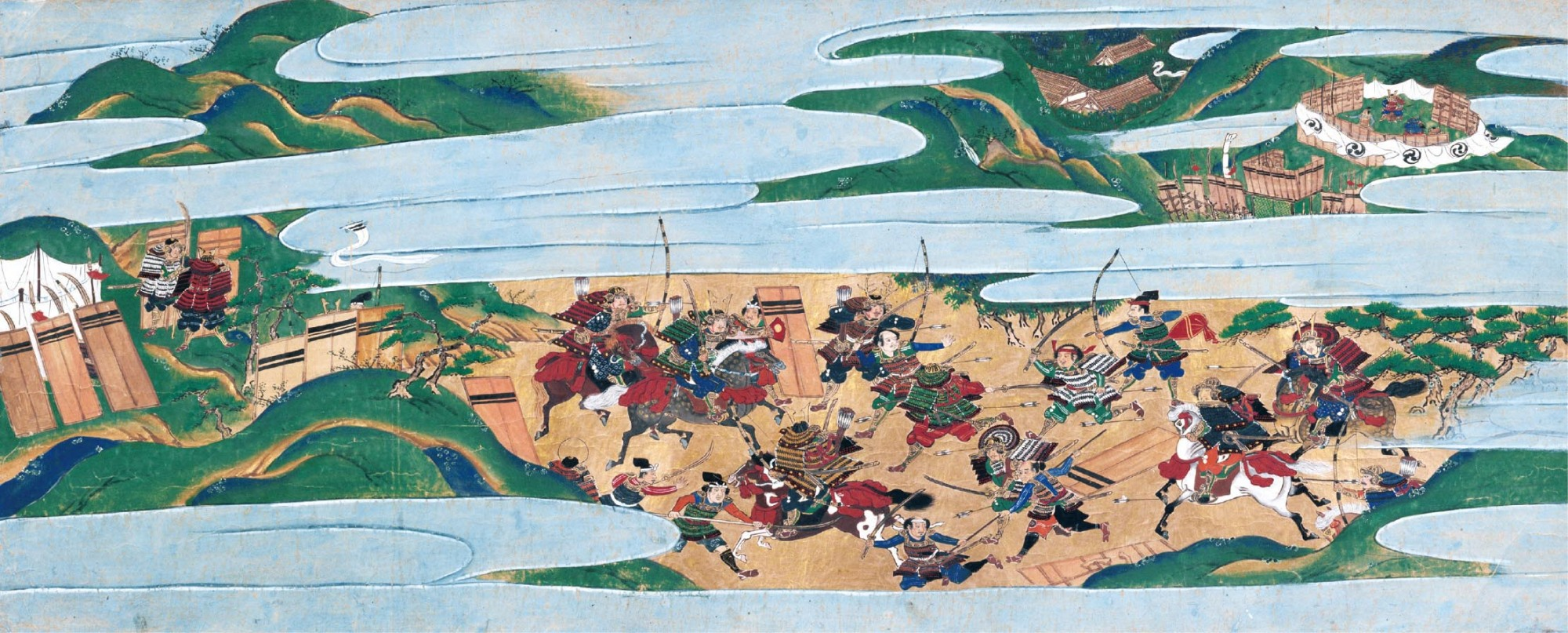
Painting depicting a battle during the Ōnin War

With the war unresolved and the shōgun doing little to end it, other daimyō were free to fight private wars and skirmishes. No part of Japan escaped the violence. Although the battles in Kyoto had been abandoned, the war had spread to the rest of Japan. In Yamashiro Province, the Hatakeyama clan had split into two parts that fought each other to a standstill. In 1485, the peasantry and jizamurai (lesser samurai – mostly armed peasants) revolted. They organized the Yamashiro ikki and forced the clan armies to leave the province. The ikki became a powerful force. By 1486 they had set up a provisional government for Yamashiro Province.

Other ikki would form and appear throughout other parts of Japan, such as Kaga Province, where a sect of the Jōdo Shinshū Buddhists, the Ikkō, started their own revolt during the Ōnin War after being enlisted by one of Kaga's most prominent warlords, Togashi Masachika. The Ikkō, who had a complex relationship with the Jōdo Shinshū leader Rennyo, appealed to the common peasants in their region, and inevitably formed the Ikkō-ikki. By 1488 the Ikkō-ikki of Kaga Province overthrew Masachika and took control of the province.

The uprising of the Ikkō-ikki and the Yamashiro ikki formed part of the general outbreak of civil war. Sansom states some refer to this as gekokujō (roughly "the low oppress the high"), or a "disturbed social order". Sansom further states, "The frequent risings of the fifteenth century were expressions of popular discontent in which peasants took part".

== Aftermath ==
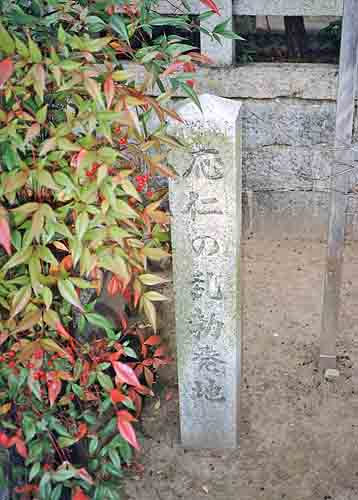
Marker at the location of the outbreak of the Ōnin War

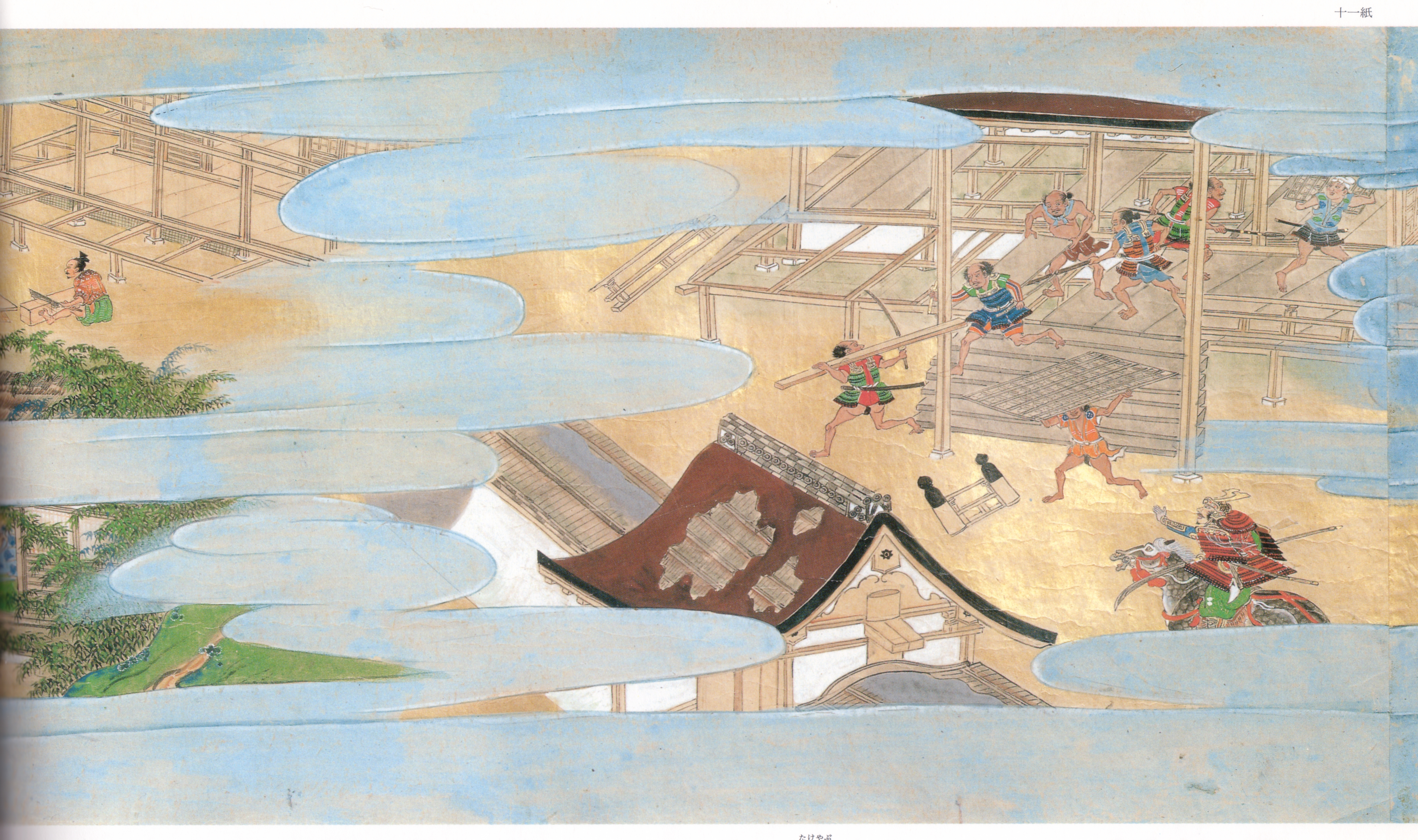
Ashigaru soldiers plundering building materials from Shinnyo-dō temple

After the Ōnin War, the Ashikaga bakufu completely fell apart; for all practical purposes, the Hosokawa family was in charge and the Ashikaga shōguns became their puppets. When Yoshimi's son Yoshitane was made shōgun in 1490, the Hosokawa kanrei (deputy) soon put him to flight in 1493 and declared another Ashikaga, Yoshizumi, to be shōgun. In 1499, Yoshitane arrived at Yamaguchi, the capital of the Ōuchi, and this powerful family threw its military support behind Yoshitane.

In 1507, the kanrei Hosokawa Masamoto was assassinated and in 1508, Yoshizumi left Kyoto and the Ōuchi restored the shogunate to Yoshitane. Thence began a series of strange conflicts over control of the puppet government of the shogunate. After the death of Hosokawa Masamoto, his adopted sons Takakuni and Sumimoto began to fight over the succession to the kanrei, but Sumimoto himself was a puppet of one of his vassals. This would characterize the wars following the Ōnin War; these wars were more about control over puppet governments than they were about high ideals or simply greed for territory.

The Hosokawa family controlled the shogunate until 1558 when they were betrayed by a vassal family, the Miyoshi. The powerful Ōuchi were also destroyed by their vassals. In 1551 Sue Harukata forced Ōuchi Yoshitaka to kill himself; Mōri Motonari defeated Sue at Miyajima in 1555 and overthrew Ōuchi Yoshinaga in 1557.

By the end of the Warring States period only a dozen or so warlord families remained. The most important development to come out of the Ōnin War was the ceaseless civil war that ignited outside the capital city. Hosokawa tried to foment civil strife in the Ōuchi domains, for instance, and this civil strife would eventually force Ōuchi to submit and leave. From the close of the Ōnin War, this type of civil strife, either vassals striving to conquer their daimyō or succession disputes drawing in outside daimyō, was endemic throughout Japan.

In a 1921 lecture, the historian Naitō Konan called the period around the Ōnin War the most important in Japanese history, saying that to understand present-day Japan there was almost no need to study ancient history, and that knowing the history after the Ōnin War was enough.

Scholars disagree on the appropriateness of the term "Warring States period" (which is the Chinese term borrowed by the Japanese in calling this period sengoku jidai). Many argue that since Japan was essentially intact, the Emperor and shogunate remaining at least nominally in command of the whole country, and that it really wasn't a "warring states" period at all, but a "warring warlords" period. Others such as Mark Ravina, Mary Elizabeth Berry, and Conrad Totman argue that the kuni (provinces) were not unlike quasi-independent states, and that the term is thus more or less appropriate.

== Ōnin Ki ==
The Ōnin Ki (応仁記) is a document written sometime from the end of the 15th century to the middle of the 16th century (i.e. some 20 to 80 years after the conflict), which describes the causes and effects of the Ōnin War. It illustrates in detail the strategies involved in the fighting, and its chief instigators, Yamana Sōzen and Hosokawa Katsumoto, along with accounts of how the Ōnin War affected the city and its citizens:

"The flowery capital that we thought would last forever to our surprise is to become the lair of wolves and foxes. Even the North Field of Toji has fallen to ash ... Lamenting the plight of the many fallen acolytes, Ii-o Hikorokusaemon-No-Jou read a passage:

Nare ya shiru
Miyako wa nobe no
Yū-hibari
Agaru wo mite mo
Ochiru namida wa

Now the city that you knew
Has become an empty moor,
From which the evening skylark rises
While your tears fall."

== Chronology ==
The origins of the Ōnin conflict are manifold. The initial phase of this decade-long struggle "was only a spark which set fire to a broader conflagration". Without fully anticipating the consequences, the Muromachi government had loosened the restraints of tradition in Japanese society, which meant that "new energies were released, new classes were formed, and new wealth was created". As the shogunate's powerful figures competed for influence in Kyoto, the leading families in the provinces were amassing resources and growing more independent of centralized controls.

Precursors

- 1443 Ashikaga Yoshimasa becomes shōgun.
- 1445 Hosokawa Katsumoto becomes Kyoto kanrei.
- 1449 Ashikaga Shigeuji assumes office in the Kantō.
- 1457 Ōta Dōkan builds Edo Castle. Ashikaga Masatomo is sent to govern the Kantō.
- 1458 Yoshimasa builds a new Muromachi palace.
- 1464 Yoshimasa decides to abdicate his position as Shogun to his brother Ashikaga Yoshimi. Hino Tomiko is against the decision and goes in search of military support for her future son to succeed the shogunate.
- 1465 Hino Tomiko gives birth to Ashikaga Yoshihisa and calls herself regent to her son.
- 1466 Yamana Sōzen and Hosokawa Katsumoto gather troops near Kyoto.

Warfare begins

- 1467 Outbreak of the Ōnin War. Yamana is declared a rebel. In November, the Shōkoku-ji (相国寺) is destroyed.
- 1468 Yoshimi goes over to Yamana's side.
- 1469 Yoshimasa names Yoshihisa his heir.
- 1471 Ikkō-ikki Buddhist sect gains strength in the North. Asakura Toshikage becomes Constable (shugo) of Echizen.
- 1473 Yamana and Hosokawa die. Yoshimasa retires.
- 1477 Ōuchi clan leaves Kyoto. End of the Ōnin War.

Conflicts following the war

- 1485 Agrarian uprisings in Yamashiro.
- 1489 Yoshihisa dies.
- 1490 Yoshimasa dies. Ashikaga Yoshitane becomes shōgun.
- 1492 Hōjō Sōun becomes master of Izu.
- 1493 Yoshitane abdicates.
- 1494 Hosokawa Masamoto becomes Kyoto kanrei.
- 1495 Sōun captures Odawara.
- 1496 Hino Tomiko dies.
- 1508 Ōuchi restores Yoshitane.
- 1545 Hōjō Ujiyasu defeats the Uesugi clan forces at Kawagoe.
- 1551 Sue Harukata defeats the Ōuchi.
- 1554 Mōri succeeds to Ōuchi lands and power.
- 1555 Uesugi Kenshin and Takeda Shingen fight at Kawanakajima.
- 1560 Victory of Oda Nobunaga at Okehazama.

== See also ==
- Higashiyama period
- List of wars
- Military history of Japan
