= Samurai-dokoro =

The Samurai-dokoro (侍所 - Board of Retainers) was an office of the Kamakura and Muromachi shogunates. The role of the Samurai-dokoro was to take the leadership of gokenin, the shogun's retainers, and to be in charge of the imprisonment of criminals. It was established in 1180 by Minamoto no Yoritomo, the founder of the Kamakura shogunate.

== History ==
=== Kamakura period ===
During the Kamakura period, the Samurai-dokoro was in charge of calling in and directing the gokenin, the shogun's retainers. It was also in charge of the imprisonment of criminals.

The office was administered by officials called shoshi or samuraidokoro-no-tsukasa, who were made up from the most powerful gokenin. The most senior of the officials, the president of the Samurai-dokoro, was called bettō. The office was established by Minamoto no Yoritomo in 1180, who appointed Wada Yoshimori its first bettō. However, after Yoshimori was killed during the Wada Rebellion, the shikken (regent of the shogunate) took over the post of bettō.

In the Engyobon Heike Monogatari, the Samurai-dokoro was established upon the request of Wada Yoshimori, and it was modeled after the Taira government period office called samurai bettō that Fujiwara no Tadakiyo was appointed to rule over the samurai of the eight provinces of Bandō (present-day Kantō region). If this is true, the Samurai-dokoro was not modeled after the household agency of noble families that shares the same name.

As Yoritomo's position rose, the Samurai-dokoro began to also take on the role of a domestic administration institution. In the Kenkyū era, Wada Yoshimori, the bettō, was in charge of military affairs in general as well as domestic administration, and Kajiwara Kagetoki, a shoshi, was in charge of directing the gokenin, the basis of the Kamakura shogunate.

=== Muromachi period ===
Under the Muromachi shogunate, the Samurai-dokoro was led by a tōnin or shoshi, who was assisted by a shoshi-dai. Bugyōnin was in charge of administrative paperwork, and there were junior officers, kodoneri, zōshiki, and others. Additionally, kaikō took on the duties of a clerk, metsuke worked as an inspector, and yoriudo took on the duties of an investigator, among other officials.

The Samurai-dokoro was largely dependent on the military power of the daimyo, and in reality the shoshi-dai, a high-ranking retainer of the shoshi, was in charge of the Samurai-dokoro. During events like the Tsuchi-ikki peasant uprising, a powerful military was required to suppress the chaotic situation, and in such cases the Samurai-dokoro asked help from the daimyo and the kenmon (powerful families).

Between the late Muromachi period and the Sengoku period, shoshi and shoshi-dai were no longer appointed, and the kaikō was in turn charge of the Samurai-dokoro. The shogunate bugyōnin was appointed this post and was either from the Matsuda clan or the Īno'o clan. The kaikō was required to stay in Kyoto and be in charge of Kyoto's public security and the management of prisons, and also served as an advisor to the shogun and other kenmon on judgements. Additionally, after mid-Muromachi period, the kaikō formed its own military by recruiting local Kyoto jizamurai and skilled vagrants. After the Ōnin War (1467-77), the military power of the shoshi weakened, and the kaikō's hikan and the officials of another Samurai-dokoro took over the public security. Additionally, the military power of the kaikō directly played a part in the military power of the Ashikaga shoguns, and according to the records at the time, the kaikō could mobilize an estimated 200 to 300 men.

== Bettō ==
Name	Term
Wada Yoshimori	1180 - 119?
Ōtomo Yoshinao (acting)	1194
Kajiwara Kagetoki	119? - 1199
Wada Yoshimori	1200 - 1213
Hōjō Yoshitoki	1213 - 1224
Hōjō Yasutoki	1224 - 1242
Hōjō Tsunetoki	1242 - 1246
Hōjō Tokiyori	1246 - 1256
Hōjō Nagatoki	1256 - 1264
Hōjō Masamura	1264 - 1268
Hōjō Tokimune	1268 - 1284
Hōjō Sadatoki	1284 - 1301
Hōjō Morotoki	1301 - 1311
Hōjō Munenobu	1311 - 1312
Hōjō Hirotoki	1312 - 1315
Hōjō Mototoki	1315 - 1316
Hōjō Takatoki	1316 - 1326
Hōjō Sadaaki	1326
Hōjō Moritoki	1326 - 1333
Hōjō Sadayuki	1333

== Tōnin ==
Name	Term
Miura Sadatsura	1336
Sasaki Nakachika	1336
Kō no Moroyasu	1336
Miura Takatsugu	1337
Minami Munetsugu	1338 - 1339
Hosokawa Kazuuji	1340
Hosokawa Akiuji	1340 - 1344
Niki Yoshinaga	1344
Yamana Tokiuji	1345
Hosokawa Akiuji	1346
Niki Yoriaki	1350
Hosokawa Yoriharu	1352
Kyōgoku Hidetsuna	1352
Toki Yoriyasu	1353 - 1354
Satake Yoshiatsu	1354 - 1357
Kyōgoku Takahide	1357 - 1363
Toki Naouji	1364 - 1365
Shiba Yoshitane	1365 - 1366
Niki Yorinatsu	1366
Imagawa Sadayo	1366 - 1367
Imagawa Kuniyasu	1368
Toki Yasuyuki	1369
Kyōgoku Takahide	1370 - 1372
Toki Yoshiyuki	1373
Imagawa Kuniyasu	1373
Hosokawa Yorimoto	1373 - 1375
Yamana Tokiyoshi	1375
Hatakeyama Motokuni	1376
Yamana Ujikiyo	1377
Imagawa Yasunori	1378
Yamana Yoshiyuki	1378 - 1379
Toki Akinao	1380
Isshiki Akinori	1381 - 1383
Yamana Tokiyoshi	1384 - 1385
Toki Mitsusada	1385
Yamana Tokiyoshi	1386
Akamatsu Yoshinori	1388
Toki Yorimasu	1388 - 1389
Akamatsu Yoshinori	1389 - 1391
Hatakeyama Motokuni	1392 - 1394
Kyōgoku Takanori	1394 - 1398
Akamatsu Yoshinori	1399 - 1402
Toki Yorimasu	1403 - 1403
Kyōgoku	1403
Isshiki	1405 - 1406
Akamatsu Yoshinori	1406 - 1408
Kyōgoku Takamitsu	1409
Akamatsu Mitsusuke	1411 - 1413
Yamana Tokihiro	1414
Isshiki Yoshitsura	1414 - 1421
Kyōgoku Takakazu	1421 - 1428
Akamatsu Mitsusuke	1428 - 1432
Isshiki Yoshitsura	1432 - 1436
Akamatsu Mitsusuke	1438
Toki Mochimasu	1439
Yamana Mochitoyo	1440 - 1441
Kyōgoku Mochikiyo	1441 - 1447
Isshiki Norichika	1447 - 1449
Kyōgoku Mochikiyo	1449 - 1466
Akamatsu Masanori	1471 - 1483
Kyōgoku Kimune	1485

== See also ==
- Kondeidokoro
