= Ashikaga Yoshimi =

Brother of Shōgun Ashikaga Yoshimasa

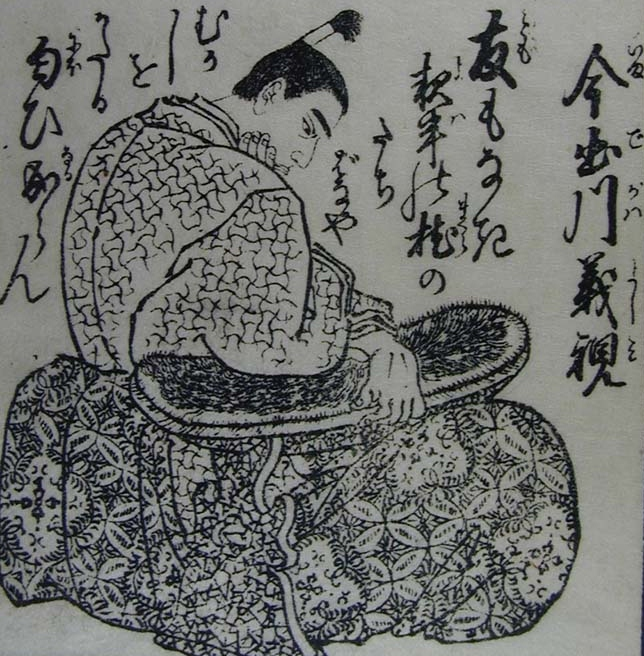
- Born: March 3, 1439
- Died: February 15, 1491 (aged 51)
- Relatives: Ashikaga Yoshinori (Father); Ashikaga Yoshimasa (Brother)

Signature
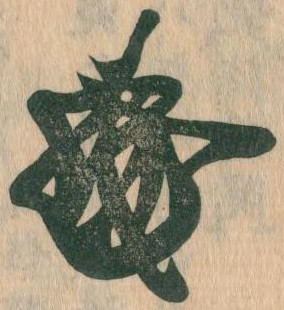

Ashikaga Yoshimi (足利 義視) (March 3, 1439 – February 15, 1491) was the brother of Shōgun Ashikaga Yoshimasa, and a rival for the succession in a dispute that would lead to the Ōnin War.

== Life ==
Yoshimi was the abbot of a Jōdo monastery when he was first approached in 1464 by Hosokawa Katsumoto, who wished to support a bid for Yoshimi to become shōgun. He originally sought to stick to his religious life, and had no desires to become shōgun. However, by 1464, he was convinced to join his brother, the shōgun, and assist him, putting himself into a position to be the next in the line of succession. The birth of the Shōgun's son placed Yoshimi in an awkward situation, making his succession no longer definite, but he remained as Yoshimasa's Deputy.

Despite Yoshimi's support by Hosokawa, it was Hosokawa's opponent, Yamana Sōzen, who stayed in Yoshimi's mansion for a time, and who attended a ceremony in March 1467 honoring the shōgun and his brother. Hosokawa did not attend, as he was preparing for the imminent war between himself and Yamana, who supported the succession of the shōgun's infant son Ashikaga Yoshihisa.

Following the initial battles between Hosokawa and Yamana within the capital (Kyoto), the Ōnin War turned into a war between Yoshimi and his brother the Shōgun. Through a set of complicated events, Yoshimi became one of Yamana's chief generals, and was declared a "rebel" by the Emperor, and stripped of his court rank. That same year, 1469, the shōgun officially named his son heir.

Yamana and Hosokawa both died soon afterwards, in 1473, and the Ōnin War came to an end in 1477, along with Yoshimi's political aspirations.
