= Ashikaga Yoshihisa =

Military ruler of Japan from 1465 to 1489

- 足利 義尚
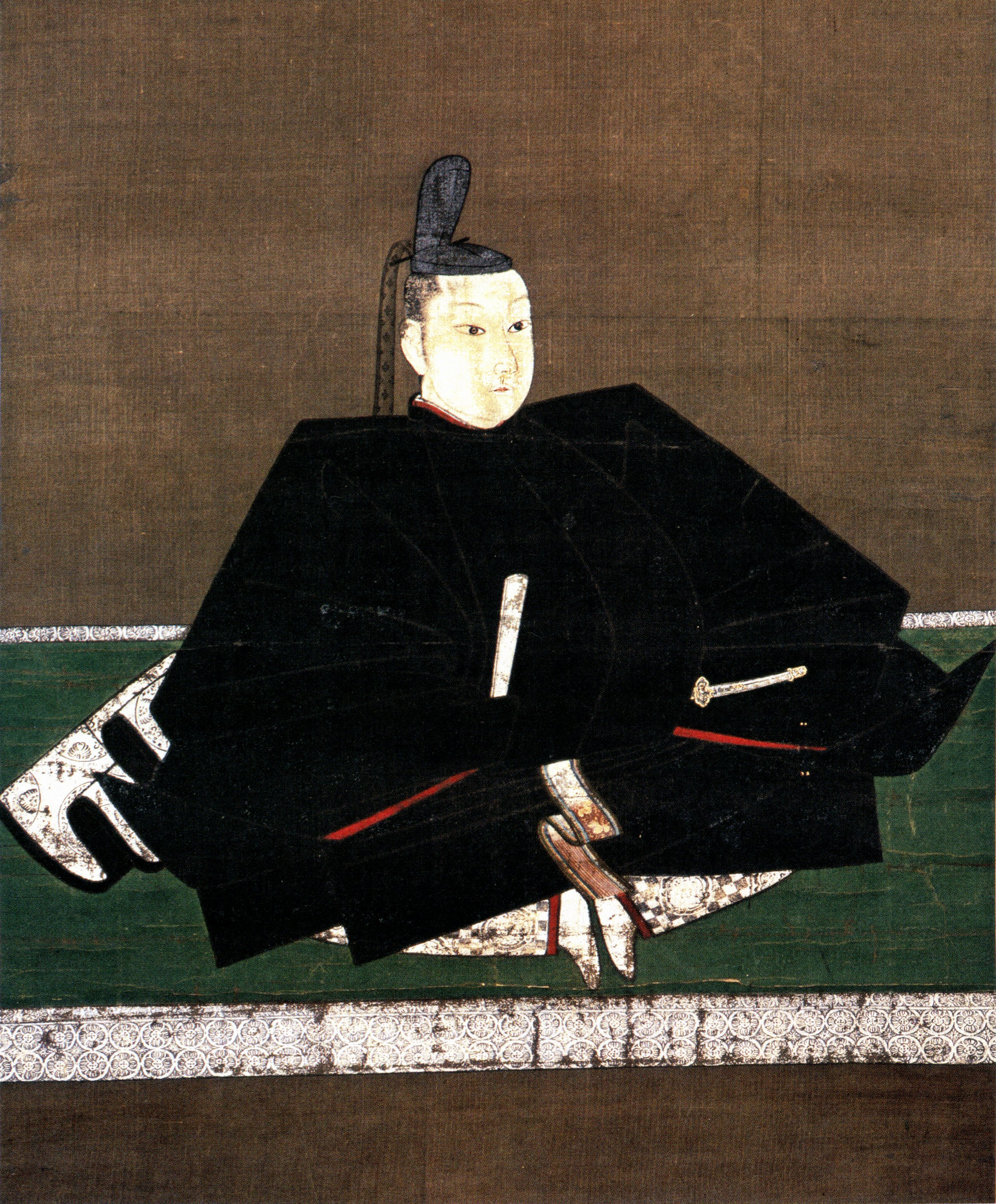

Shōgun
- In office 1474–1489
- Monarch: Go-Tsuchimikado
- Preceded by: Ashikaga Yoshimasa
- Succeeded by: Ashikaga Yoshiki

Personal details
- Born: December 11, 1465
- Died: April 26, 1489 (aged 23)
- Spouse: daughter of Hino Katsumitsu
- Parents: Ashikaga Yoshimasa (father); Hino Tomiko (mother)
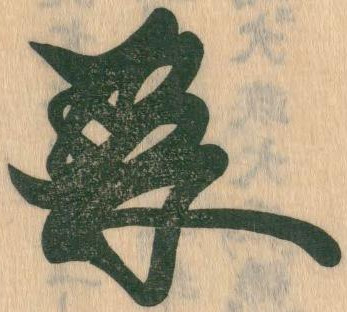
- Signature

Ashikaga Yoshihisa (足利 義尚; December 11, 1465 – April 26, 1489) was the 9th shōgun of the Ashikaga shogunate who reigned from 1473 to 1489 during the Muromachi period of Japan. Yoshihisa was the son of the eighth shōgun Ashikaga Yoshimasa with his wife Hino Tomiko.

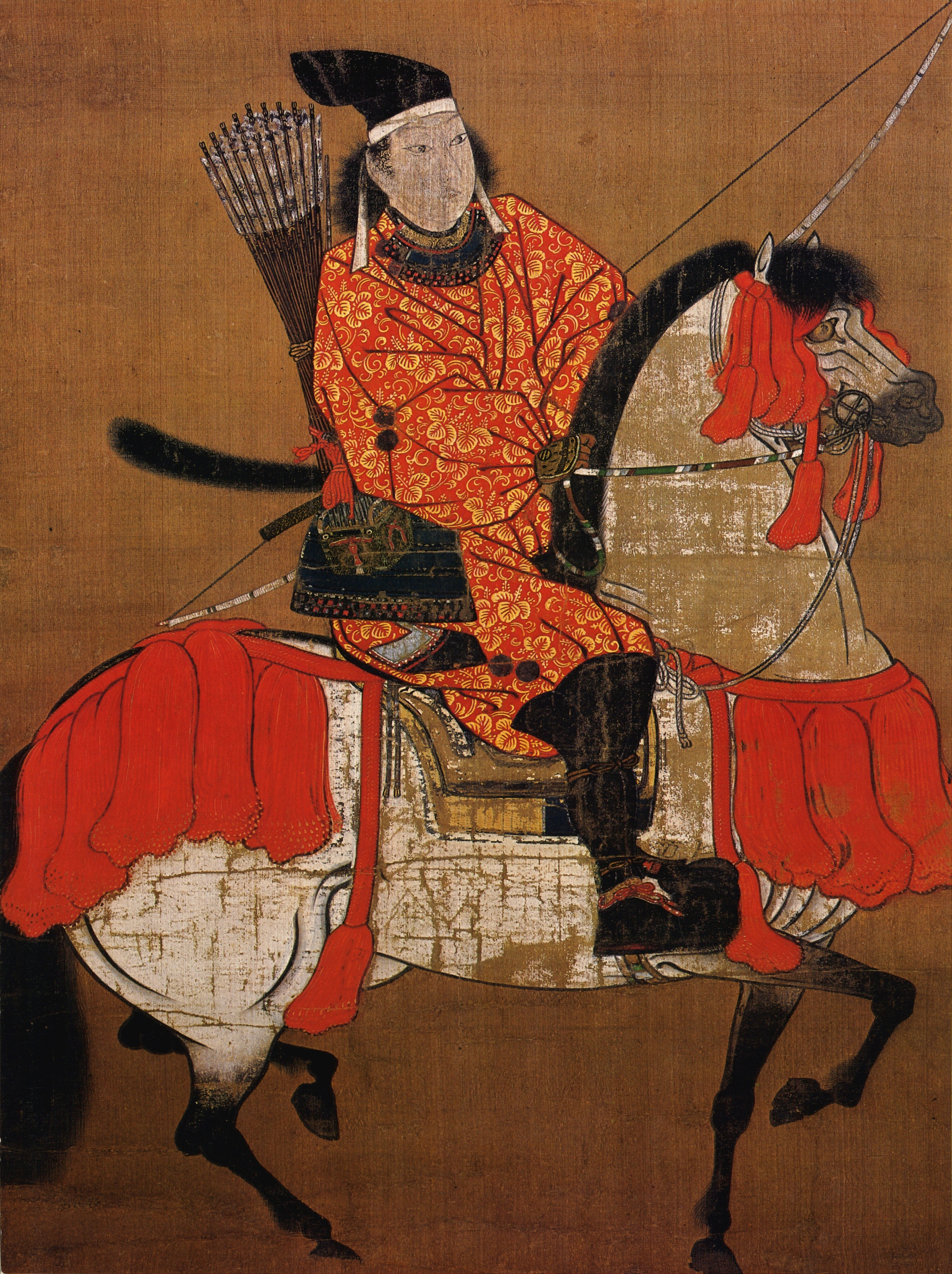
Ashikaga Yoshihisa's portrait by Kanō Masanobu.

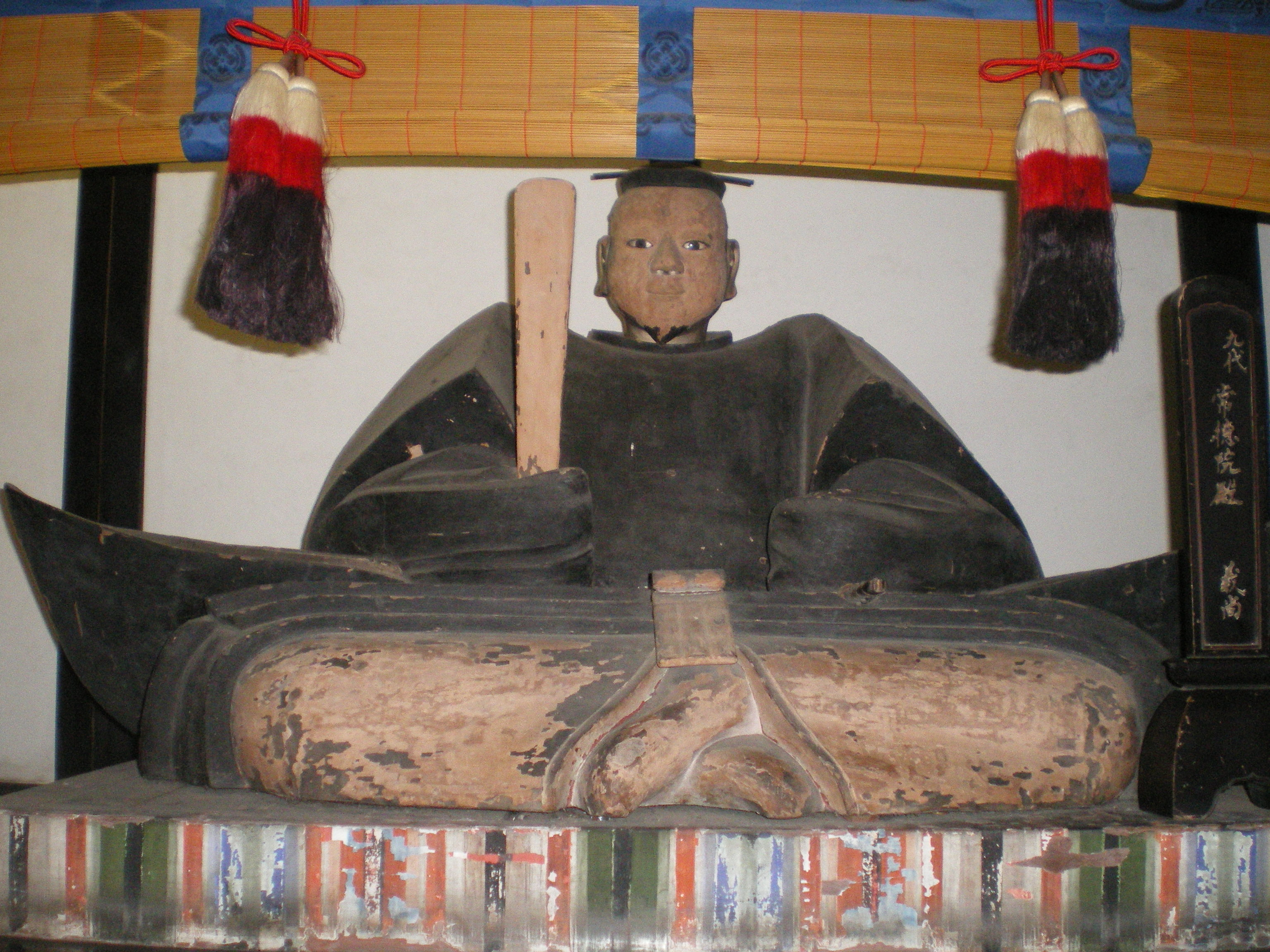
Ashikaga Yoshihisa's wooden statue at Tōji-in.

Since the almost 30-year-old shōgun Yoshimasa had no heir by 1464, he adopted his younger brother Ashikaga Yoshimi to succeed him. However, Yoshihisa was born in the next year starting a struggle for succession between brothers that erupted into the Ōnin War starting in 1467, beginning the Sengoku period of Japanese history. In the middle of hostilities, Yoshimasa retired in 1473, relinquishing the position of Sei-i Taishōgun to Yoshihisa.

== Events of Yoshihisa's bakufu ==
Yoshihisa's shogunal administration begins in 1479. The Kaga Rebellion occurs in 1488 in Kaga Province during his reign. The next year, Yoshihisa dies in camp during campaign against Sasaki Takayori; Yoshimasa resumes administration but dies the next year.

After the Ōnin war, Rokkaku Takayori, daimyō of southern Ōmi Province, seized land and manors owned by nobles of the imperial court, temples, and shrines. In 1487, Yoshihisa led a campaign (Rokkaku Tobatsu) against Takayori but died unexpectedly, leaving no heir. Yoshihisa was followed by his cousin, tenth shōgun Ashikaga Yoshitane, the following year.

== Family ==
- Father: Ashikaga Yoshimasa
- Mother: Hino Tomiko
- Wife: Shōun'in, daughter of Hino Katsumitsu
- Concubine: daughter of Tokudaiji priest
- Child: a daughter

== Eras of Yoshihisa's bakufu ==
The years in which Yoshihisa was shōgun are more specifically identified by more than one era name or nengō.

- Bunmei (1469–1487)
- Chōkyō (1487–1489)

== Notes ==
Preceded by Ashikaga Yoshimasa	Shōgun: Ashikaga Yoshihisa; 1473–1489	Succeeded by Ashikaga Yoshitane
