= Ashikaga Yoshimasa =

Japanese Samurai, Daimyo and Military ruler of Japan from 1436 to 1490

- 足利 義政
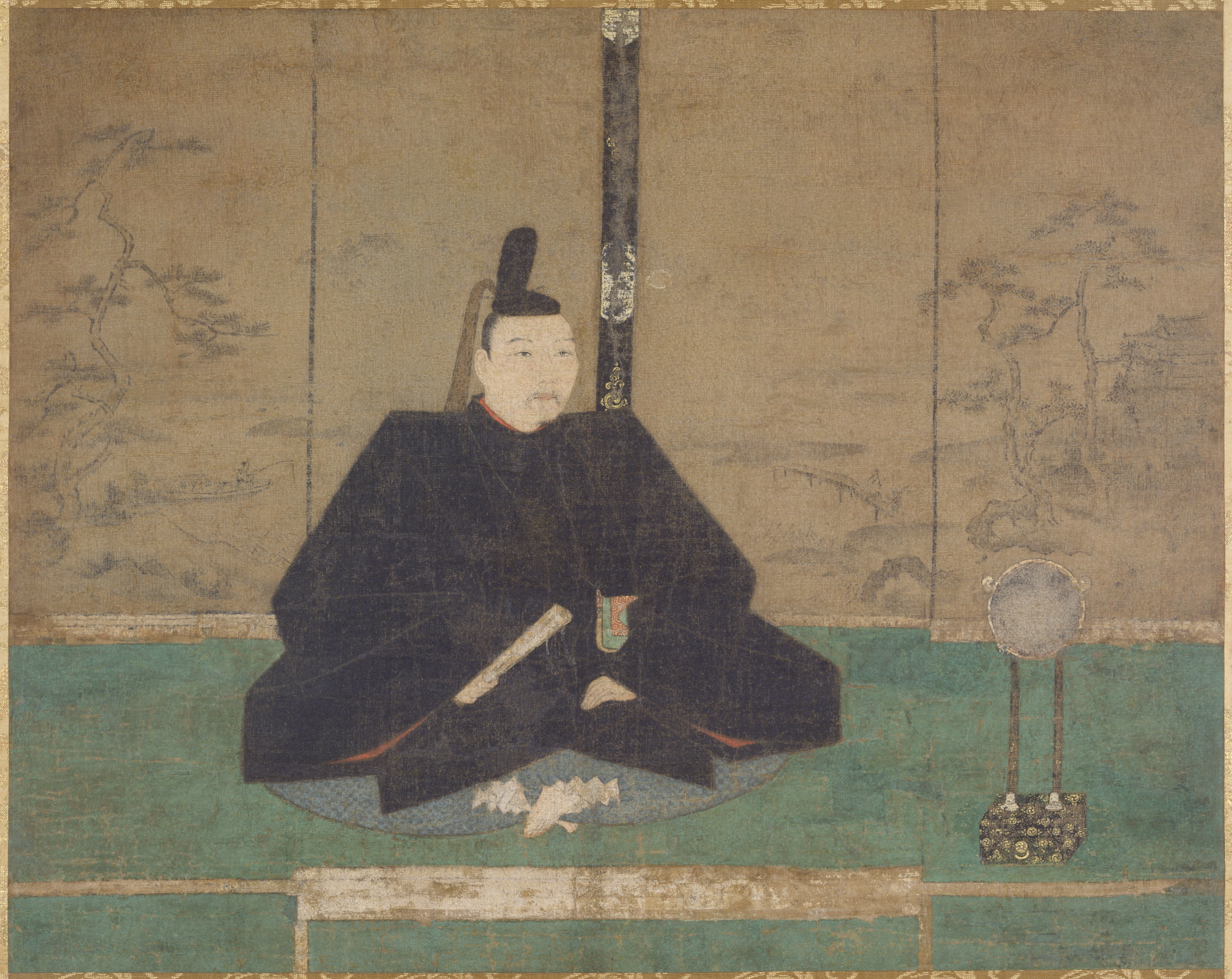
- Portrait attributed to Tosa Mitsunobu, latter half of 15th century

Shōgun
- In office 1443–1473
- Monarchs: Go-Hanazono; Go-Tsuchimikado
- Preceded by: Ashikaga Yoshikatsu
- Succeeded by: Ashikaga Yoshihisa

Personal details
- Born: January 20, 1436
- Died: January 27, 1490 (aged 54)
- Spouse: Hino Tomiko
- Parent: Ashikaga Yoshinori (father)
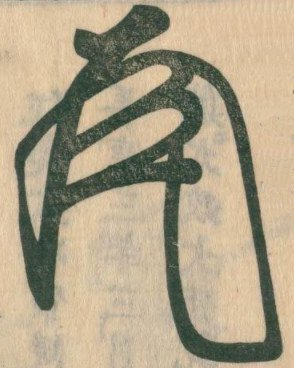
- Signature

Ashikaga Yoshimasa (Note: Japanese pronunciation: [ä̀.ɕi̥.kä́.ɡä̀ | jò̞.ɕí.mä̀.sä̀, -ŋä̀ | jò̞-, -ɡä́ jó̞-, -ŋä́ jó̞-]) (足利 義政; January 20, 1436 – January 27, 1490) was a Japanese samurai, daimyo and the eighth shōgun of the Ashikaga shogunate who reigned from 1443 to 1473 during the Muromachi period of Japan. His actions led to the Ōnin War (1467–1477), which triggered the Sengoku period. His reign saw a cultural flourishing in the arts, the development of tea ceremony, Zen Buddhism and wabi-sabi aesthetics.

== Biography ==
Yoshimasa was the son of the sixth shōgun Ashikaga Yoshinori. His childhood name was Miharu (三春). His official wife was Hino Tomiko.

On August 16, 1443, the 10-year-old shōgun Yoshikatsu died of injuries sustained in a fall from a horse. He had been shōgun for only three years. Immediately, the bakufu elevated Yoshinari, the young shōgun's even younger brother, to be the new shōgun. Several years after becoming shōgun, Yoshinari changed his name to Yoshimasa, by which he is better known.

Also in 1443, supporters of the Southern Court orchestrated the theft of the Imperial regalia. Following this event, in 1445, Hosokawa Katsumoto assumed the role of Kyoto kanrei. The year 1446 marked a significant development as the Southern army faced a crushing defeat, leading to the subsequent suppression of remnants from the Southern dynasty in 1448. In 1449, Yoshimasa was appointed shōgun, and Ashikaga Shigeuji became Kantō kubō. While the period between 1450 and 1455 experienced disturbances in Kamakura between Kantō kubō Ashikaga Shigeuji and his Uesugi Kanrei.

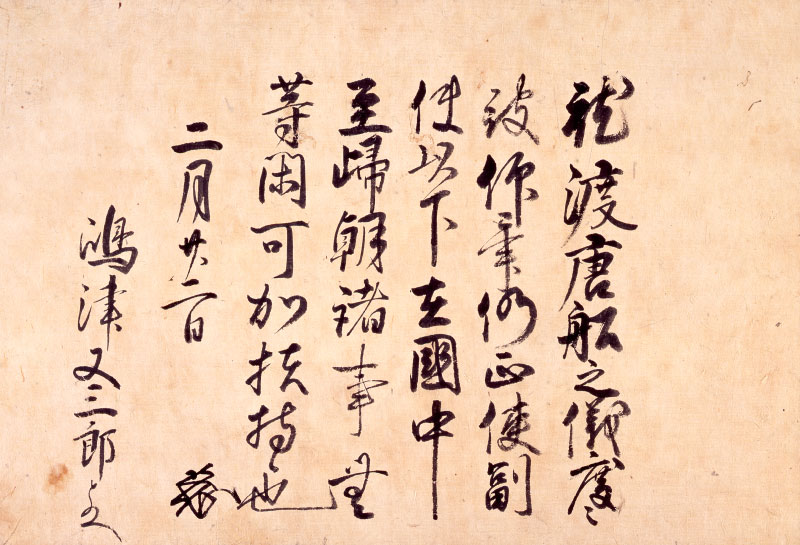
Letter from Ashikaga Yoshimasa to Shimazu Tadamasa. Part of the Shimazu-ke Monjo collection (島津家文書). National Treasure.

The 1450s saw several events unfolded which set the stage for the impending civil war. In 1454, dissension arose in the Hatakeyama succession. Discord in Kamakura between the Kubō and his Uesugi Kanrei line, resulting in the establishment of "Koga Kubō" (1455–1583) in 1455. Following this in 1457, the "Horikoshi Kubō" (1457–1491) was established. The Imperial regalia, which had been stolen, was restored to the Northern Court in 1458. In 1460, Hatakeyama rebelled against Yoshimasa. The latter adopted Ashikaga Yoshimi in 1464. The year 1466 saw the birth of Yoshihisa, and Emperor Go-Tsuchimikado ascended the throne during the same year. Additionally, dissension over the Shiba succession occurred in 1466.

== Ōnin War ==
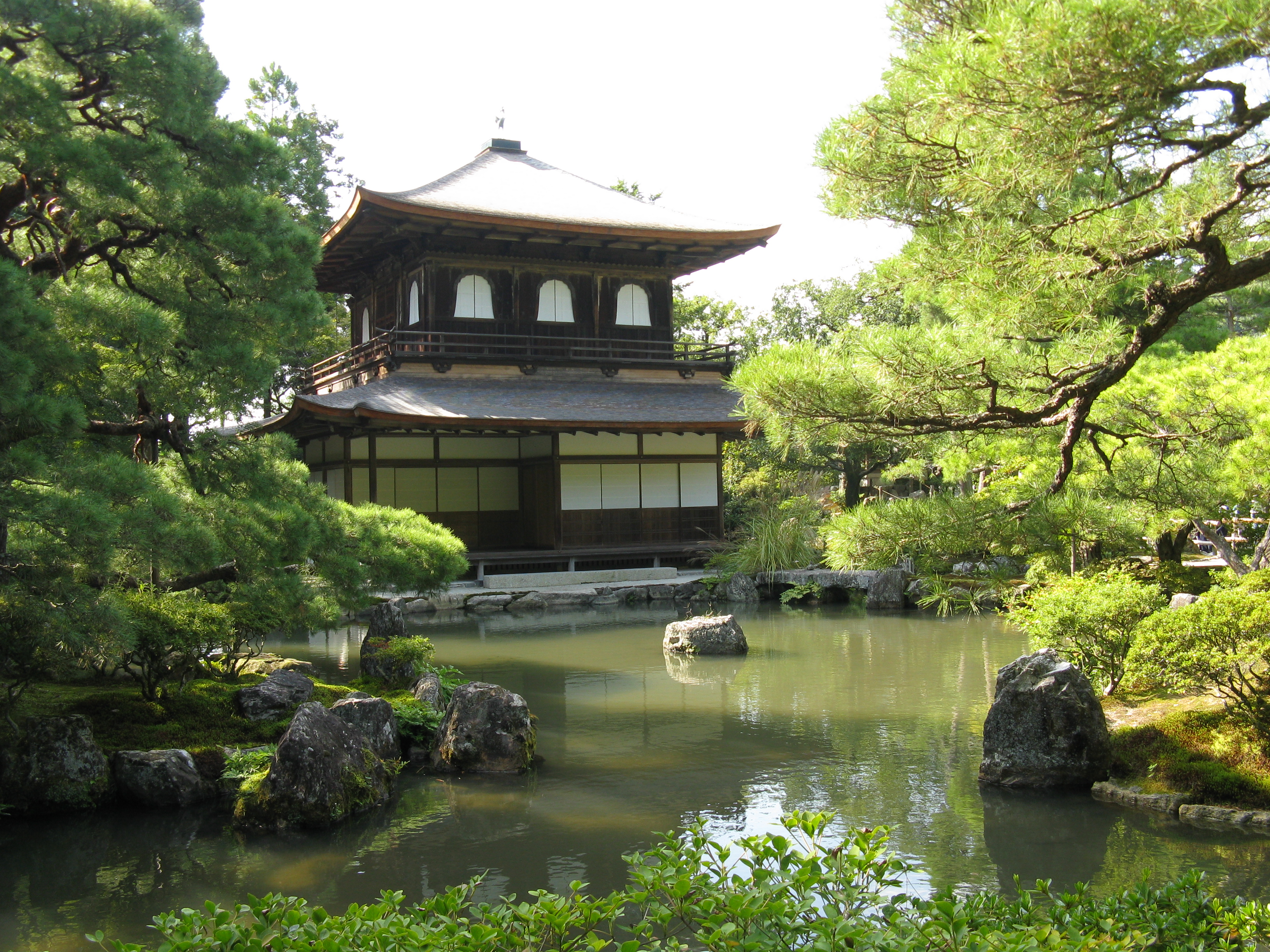
Silver Pavilion (Ginkaku) and garden of Jishō-ji, the residence of the retired Ashikaga shōgun in the Higashiyama hills of Kyoto

By 1464, Yoshimasa had no heir, so he adopted his younger brother, Ashikaga Yoshimi, in order to avoid any conflicts which might arise at the end of his shogunate. However, in the next year, Yoshimasa was surprised by the birth of a son, Ashikaga Yoshihisa. The infant's birth created a conflict between the two brothers over who would follow Yoshimasa as shōgun. Yoshimasa's wife, Hino Tomiko, attempted to get Yamana Sōzen to support the infant's claim to the shogunate. By 1467 the simmering dispute had evolved, encouraging a split amongst the powerful shugo daimyōs and clan factions. The armed conflict which ensued has come to be known as the Ōnin War. This armed contest marks the beginning of the Sengoku period of Japanese history, a troubled period of constant military clashes which lasted over a century. A number of developments affect the unfolding battles of the war such as the moment Yoshimi joins Yamana Sōzen in 1468; Yoshihisa appointed heir to shogunate in 1469; Asakura Takakage appointed shugo of Echizen Province in 1471 and when Yamana Sōzen and Hosokawa Katsumoto both die in 1473.

In the midst of on-going hostilities, Yoshimasa retired in 1473. He relinquished the position of Sei-i Taishōgun to his young son, who became the ninth shōgun Ashikaga Yoshihisa; but effectively, Yoshimasa continued to hold the reins of power. With the leaders of the two warring factions dead and with the ostensible succession dispute resolved, the rationale for continuing to fight faded away. The exhausted armies dissolved and by 1477 open warfare ended.

== Yoshimasa's heirs ==
When Yoshimasa declared that Yoshihisa would be the next shōgun after he stepped down from that responsibility, he anticipated that his son would out-live him. When shōgun Yoshihisa died prematurely, Yoshimasa reassumed the power and responsibility he had wanted to lay aside. Shōgun Yoshimasa adopted the son of his brother, Yoshimi. In 1489, shōgun Yoshitane was installed; and Yoshimasa retired again.

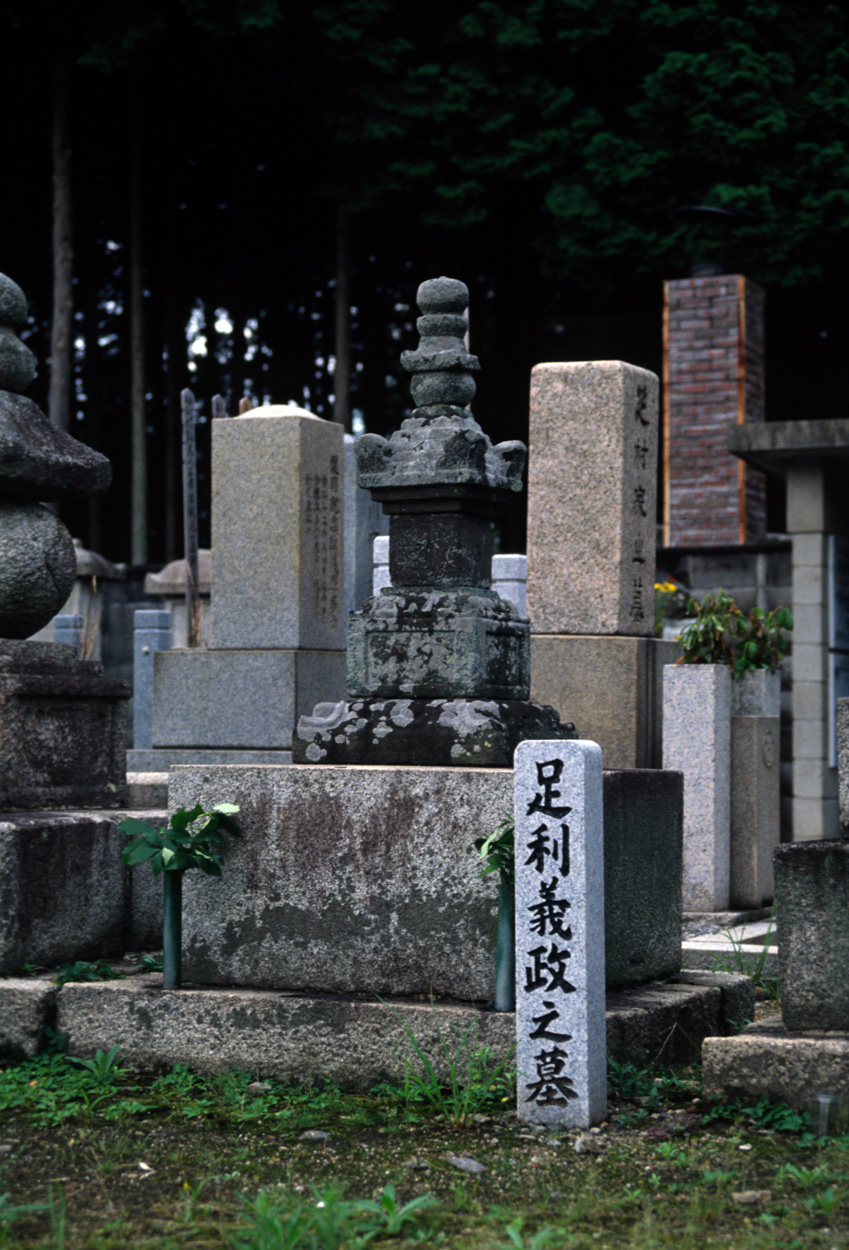
Grave of Ashikaga Yoshimasa, Kyoto

Before Yoshimasa died in 1490, he again adopted a nephew as heir, this time the son of his brother, Masatomo. Although Yoshitane did outlive Yoshimasa, his shogunate would prove short-lived. Yoshitane died in 1493.

Also, before he married Hino Tomiko, sister of Hino Katsumitsu, he had a concubine, Lady Oima, who was 8 months pregnant when Tomiko pushed her from the stairs which resulted in a miscarriage.

Shōgun Yoshimasa was succeeded by shōgun Yoshihisa (Yoshimasa's natural son), then by shōgun Yoshitane (Yoshimasa's first adopted son), and then by shōgun Yoshizumi (Yoshimasa's second adopted son). Yoshizumi's progeny would directly succeed him as head of the shogunate. In the future, power struggles from outside the clan would also lead to a brief period in which the great-grandson of Yoshitane would be installed as a puppet leader of the Ashikaga shogunate.

== Higashiyama culture ==
During Yoshimasa's reign Japan saw the growth of the Higashiyama culture (Higashiyama bunka), famous for tea ceremony (Sadō), flower arrangement (Kadō or Ikebana), Noh drama, and Indian ink painting. Higashiyama culture was greatly influenced by Zen Buddhism and saw the rise of Japanese aesthetics like Wabi-sabi and the harmonization of imperial court (Kuge) and samurai (Bushi) culture.

In the history of this Higashiyama bunka period, a few specific dates are noteworthy:

- 1459 (Chōroku 3): Shōgun Yoshimasa provided a new mikoshi and a complete set of robes and other accouterments for this festival on the occasion of repairs to the Atsuta Shrine in the 1457–1459 (Chōroku 1–3).
- 1460 (Chōroku 3): Yoshimasa initiated planning for construction of a retirement villa and gardens as early as 1460; and after his death, this property would become a Buddhist temple called Jishō-ji (also known as Ginkaku-ji or the "Silver Pavilion").
- February 21, 1482 (Bummei 14, 4th day of the 2nd month): Construction of the "Silver Pavilion" is commenced.
- January 27, 1490 (Entoku 2, 7th day of the 1st month): The former shōgun Yoshimasa died at age 56 in his Higashiyama-dono estate, which marks the beginning of the end of Higashiyama bunka.

== Family ==
- Father: Ashikaga Yoshinori
- Mother: Hino Shigeko (1411–1463)
- Wife: Hino Tomiko (1440 – June 30, 1496)
- Concubine: Oodate Sachiko
- Children:
  - son (b. 1459) by Tomiko
  - Ashikaga Yoshihisa by Tomiko
  - daughter (1463–1486) by Tomiko
  - Koyama Masatoshi (1462–1505) buddhist priest in Keikyoji by Tomiko
  - Yuyama Suzho (1455–1532) later Sojiin by Sachiko
- Adopted sons:
  - Ashikaga Yoshizumi
  - Ashikaga Yoshitane

== Eras of Yoshimasa's bakufu ==
The years in which Yoshimasa was shōgun are more specifically identified by more than one era name or nengō.

- Hōtoku (1449–1452)
- Kyōtoku (1452–1455)
- Kōshō (1455–1457)
- Chōroku (1457–1460)
- Kanshō (1460–1466)
- Bunshō (1466–1467)
- Ōnin (1467–1469)
- Bunmei (1469–1487)
- Chōkyō (1487–1489)
- Entoku (1489–1492)

== Notes ==
Preceded by Ashikaga Yoshikatsu	Shōgun: Ashikaga Yoshimasa; 1449–1473	Succeeded by Ashikaga Yoshihisa
