= Yamana Sōzen =

Japanese monk

- 山名 宗全
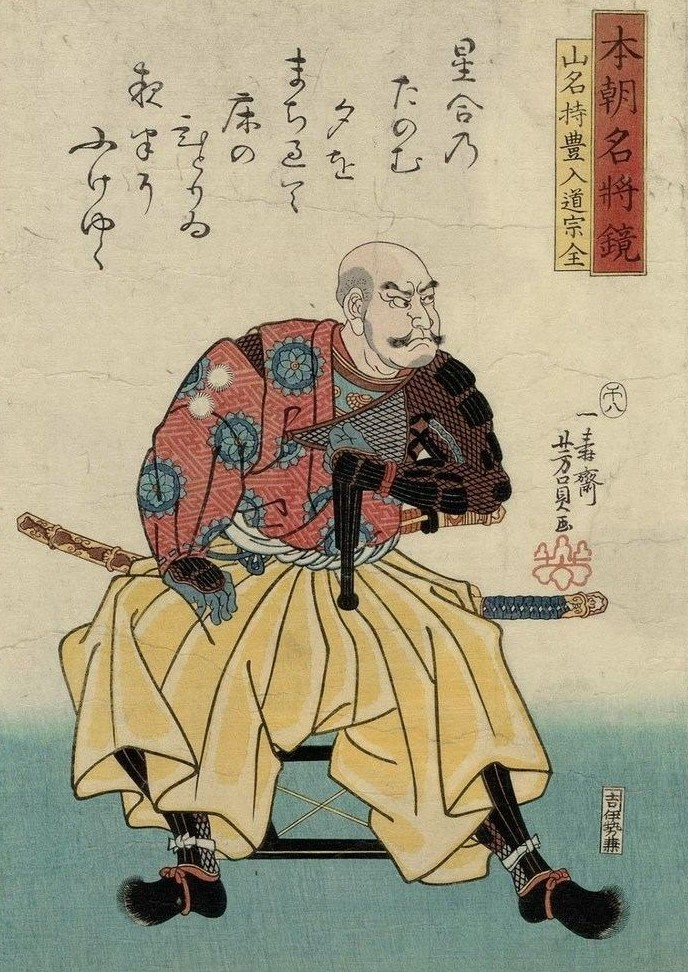

Samurai-dokoro
- In office 1440–1441
- Preceded by: Toki Mochimasu
- Succeeded by: Kyōgoku Mochikiyo

Shugo Governor of Bingo Province
- In office 1433–1450
- Preceded by: Yamana Tokihiro
- Succeeded by: Yamana Noritoyo

Shugo Governor of Aki Province
- In office 1433–1450
- Preceded by: Yamana Tokihiro
- Succeeded by: Yamana Noritoyo

Shugo Governor of Iga Province
- In office 1433–1450
- Preceded by: Yamana Tokihiro
- Succeeded by: Yamana Noritoyo

Shugo Governor of Tajima Province
- In office 1433–1450
- Preceded by: Yamana Tokihiro
- Succeeded by: Yamana Noritoyo

Shugo Governor of Harima Province
- In office 1441–1450
- Preceded by: Akamatsu Mitsusuke
- Succeeded by: Yamana Noritoyo

Personal details
- Born: July 6, 1404
- Died: April 15, 1473 (aged 68) Kyoto, Japan

Yamana Sōzen (山名 宗全; July 6, 1404 – April 15, 1473) was originally Yamana Mochitoyo (山名 持豊) before becoming a monk. Due to his red complexion, he was sometimes known as Aka-nyūdō, "the Red Monk". He was one of the shogun daimyōs who fought against Hosokawa Katsumoto during the Ōnin War in Heian-kyō.

== Biography ==
Yamana Sōzen was born to Yamana Tokihiro (1367–1435), head of the Yamana clan. Tokihiro was the shugo (provincial governor) of Tajima, Bingo, Aki, and Iga provinces. Tokihiro, who was often in bad health, retired in 1433 and passed his numerous lands to Sōzen. Sōzen went on to defeat Akamatsu Mitsuhide (1373–1441) of Akamatsu clan in the Kakitsu Incident, and became governor of Harima Province the same year.

The Yamana clan had seen many defeats over the years, while the Hosokawa clan was one of the three families which controlled the position of kanrei, deputy to the shōgun. Thus, Yamana Sōzen resented the wealth and power enjoyed by his son-in-law, Hosokawa Katsumoto. Unwilling to engage him in open warfare until he was sure of his strength, Yamana chose to intervene in a number of succession disputes and other political affairs, thwarting Hosokawa's plans and desires, and slowly gaining allies for himself.

In 1464, a succession dispute erupted over the shogunate itself. The shōgun, Ashikaga Yoshimasa, was considering retirement. Hosokawa supported the Shōgun's brother, Ashikaga Yoshimi as the successor. Hino Tomiko, who was the mother of Ashikaga Yoshihisa, was against her husband's decision to give the shogunate to Yoshimi, so she sought military support to secure the succession of her son Yoshihisa. Yamana chose to support Yoshihisa, the Shōgun's infant son.

In 1466, both sides having spent several years gathering forces, both Yamana and Hosokawa felt ready to engage the other, and skirmishes began to break out.

In 1467, the first year of Ōnin by the Japanese calendar, both men began to prepare more seriously for the coming conflict; they sought safehouses and planned for fighting in the streets. Yamana took Yoshimi to the shōgun's residence, where Hosokawa, who supported Yoshimi's claim to the shogunate, could not get at him. He was essentially a hostage.

Seeing that open war in the capital would spread to the provinces, the shōgun declared that the first to make an attack within the city would be labeled a rebel against the shogunate, and enemy of the state. Thus, for several months, the conflict quieted, neither side willing to make a move. Finally, in March 1467, the home of a Hosokawa officer was destroyed by fire. After several more minor attacks and political maneuvers, in May, Hosokawa attacked outright the mansion of one of Yamana's generals. Nevertheless, Yamana, not Hosokawa, was labeled a rebel, and enemy of the state. Some of Yamana's followers deserted, joining Hosokawa's morally superior side, but many more switched sides as a result of the work of Hosokawa's emissaries to the provinces where Yamana and his allies drew their armies.

By New Year's of 1468, nearly a year since the war began, the fighting tapered off. For much of that year, the two forces engaged in glaring contests and limited sorties, both desiring to rebuild and to act only defensively. Both spent the next several years in political, not military, conflict, and in 1469, the shōgun named his son Yoshihisa as his heir. But Hosokawa was weary of battle, and wished for peace. However, by 1473, both Hosokawa and Yamana were dead.
