= Hosokawa Katsumoto =

Japanese Kanrei

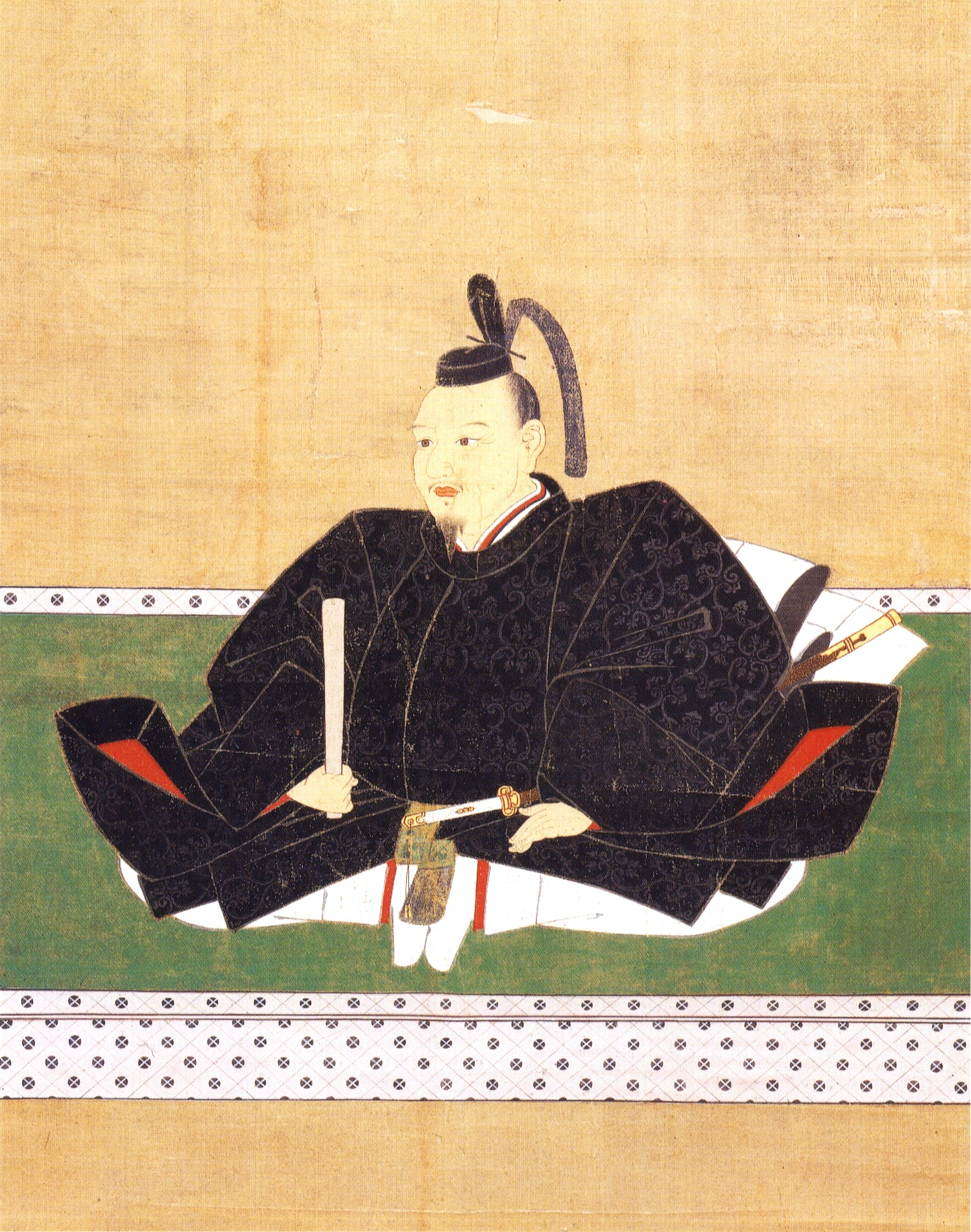
Hosokawa Katsumoto

Hosokawa Katsumoto (細川 勝元; 1430 – June 6, 1473) was one of the Kanrei, the deputies to the Shōgun, during Japan's Muromachi period. He is famous for his involvement in the creation of Ryōan-ji, a temple famous for its rock garden, and for his involvement in the Ōnin War, which sparked the 130-year Sengoku period. His childhood name was Sumiakamaru (聡明丸).

His conflicts with his father-in-law, Yamana Sōzen, who resented the power Hosokawa had as Kanrei, were among those that ignited the Ōnin War in 1467. When the Shōgun Ashikaga Yoshimasa had a son in 1464, Yamana took this as an opportunity to oppose Hosokawa further, supporting the child as heir to the Shogunate. Hosokawa had always worked closely with the Shōgun's brother Ashikaga Yoshimi and supported his claim to the shogunate.

In 1467, open war broke out in the capital of Kyoto, between Hosokawa and Yamana, who each commanded roughly 80,000 men. The Shōgun declared that the first to make war in the capital would be branded a rebel, and so the two armies remained immobile for some time, but within a few months, the tensions had risen too far, and war simply could not be delayed any further. Hosokawa made the first obvious attack within the capital, attacking the mansion of a Yamana general by the name of Isshiki. Fighting erupted between the two camps, and over the course of the next few days, many were killed, and many buildings destroyed, either by the soldiers or by looters. Each army gradually carved out a section of the city that they held and defended against the other; Hosokawa's army came to be known as the Eastern Army, as Yamana's so-called "Western Army" controlled western sections of Kyoto. But not all the fighting took place within the city; Hosokawa sent men onto the main roads, and into Yamana's home provinces, to prevent his reinforcements from reaching the main battles.

Though Hosokawa attacked first, he convinced the Shōgun to brand Yamana, not himself, with the stigma of being a rebel against the Shogunate. He even persuaded Yoshimasa to make him the general of the official Shogunal attacks on Yamana but failed to grant him any tangible support. Some of Yamana's followers deserted, joining Hosokawa's morally superior side, but many more switched sides as a result of the work of Hosokawa's emissaries to the provinces where Yamana and his allies drew their armies.

By New Year's of 1468, nearly a year after the war began, the fighting tapered off. For much of that year, the two forces engaged in glaring contests and limited sorties, both desiring to rebuild and to act only defensively. Both spent the next several years in political, not military, conflict, and in 1469, the Shōgun named his son Yoshihisa, his heir. But Hosokawa was weary of battle and wished for peace. However, by 1473, both Hosokawa and Yamana were dead.

== Family ==
- Father: Hosokawa Mochiyuki (1400-1442)
- Mother: daughter of Kyogoku Takamitsu
- Wife: Yamana Haruko
- Children:
  - Hosokawa Masamoto by Haruko
  - Tōshōin married Akamatsu Masanori by Haruko
