= 1441 =

1441 in various calendars
- Gregorian calendar: 1441; MCDXLI
- Ab urbe condita: 2194
- Armenian calendar: 890; ԹՎ ՊՂ
- Assyrian calendar: 6191
- Balinese saka calendar: 1362–1363
- Bengali calendar: 847–848
- Berber calendar: 2391
- English Regnal year: 19 Hen. 6 – 20 Hen. 6
- Buddhist calendar: 1985
- Burmese calendar: 803
- Byzantine calendar: 6949–6950
- Chinese calendar: 庚申年 (Metal Monkey); 4138 or 3931 — to — 辛酉年 (Metal Rooster); 4139 or 3932
- Coptic calendar: 1157–1158
- Discordian calendar: 2607
- Ethiopian calendar: 1433–1434
- Hebrew calendar: 5201–5202
- Hindu calendars
- Vikram Samvat: 1497–1498
- Shaka Samvat: 1362–1363
- Kali Yuga: 4541–4542
- Holocene calendar: 11441
- Igbo calendar: 441–442
- Iranian calendar: 819–820
- Islamic calendar: 844–845
- Japanese calendar: Eikyō 13 / Kakitsu 1 (嘉吉元年)
- Javanese calendar: 1356–1357
- Julian calendar: 1441; MCDXLI
- Korean calendar: 3774
- Minguo calendar: 471 before ROC 民前471年
- Nanakshahi calendar: −27
- Thai solar calendar: 1983–1984
- Tibetan calendar: ལྕགས་ཕོ་སྤྲེ་ལོ་ (male Iron-Monkey); 1567 or 1186 or 414 — to — ལྕགས་མོ་བྱ་ལོ་ (female Iron-Bird); 1568 or 1187 or 415

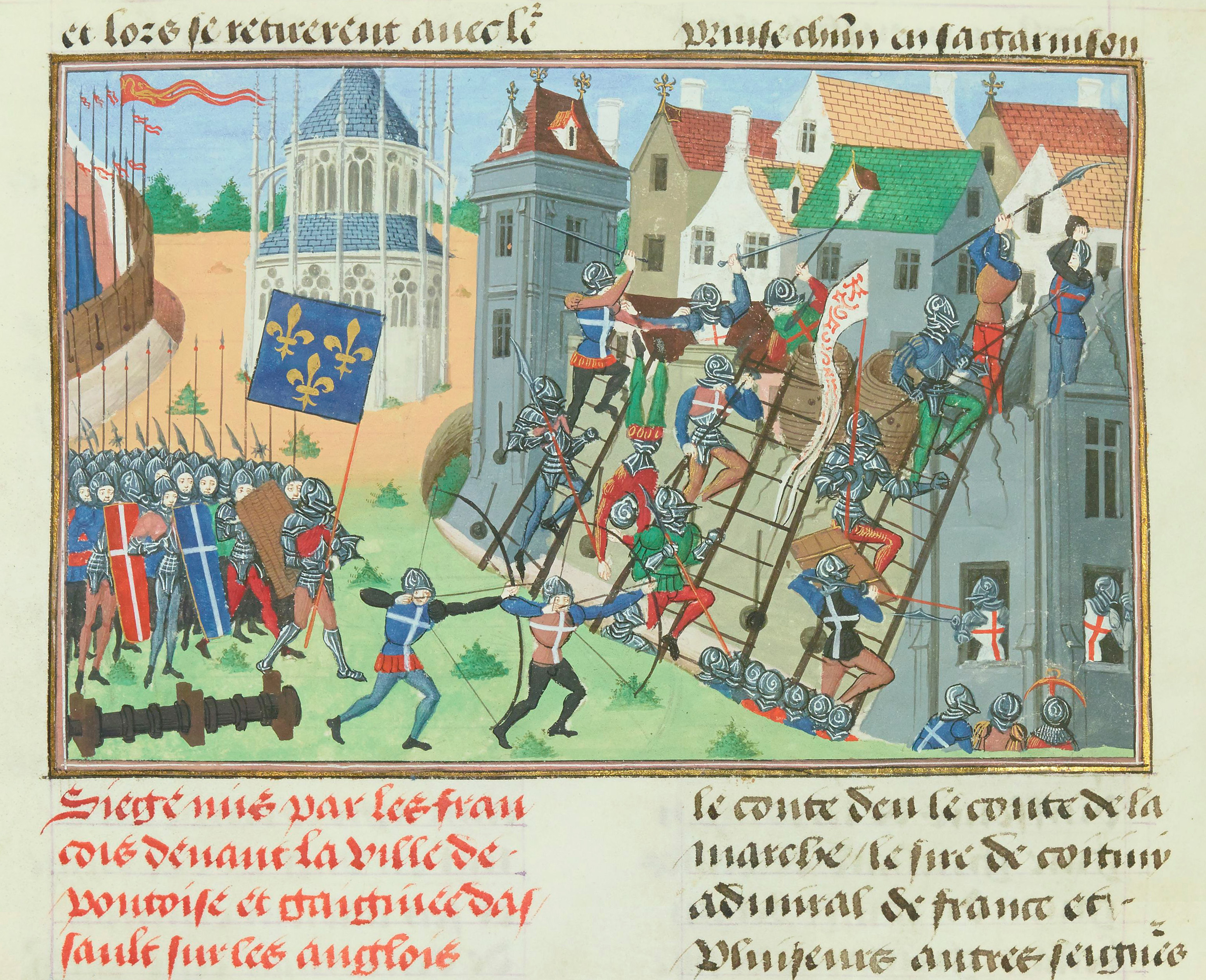
September 19: French Army recaptures Pontoise, English fortress near Paris, after three-month siege.

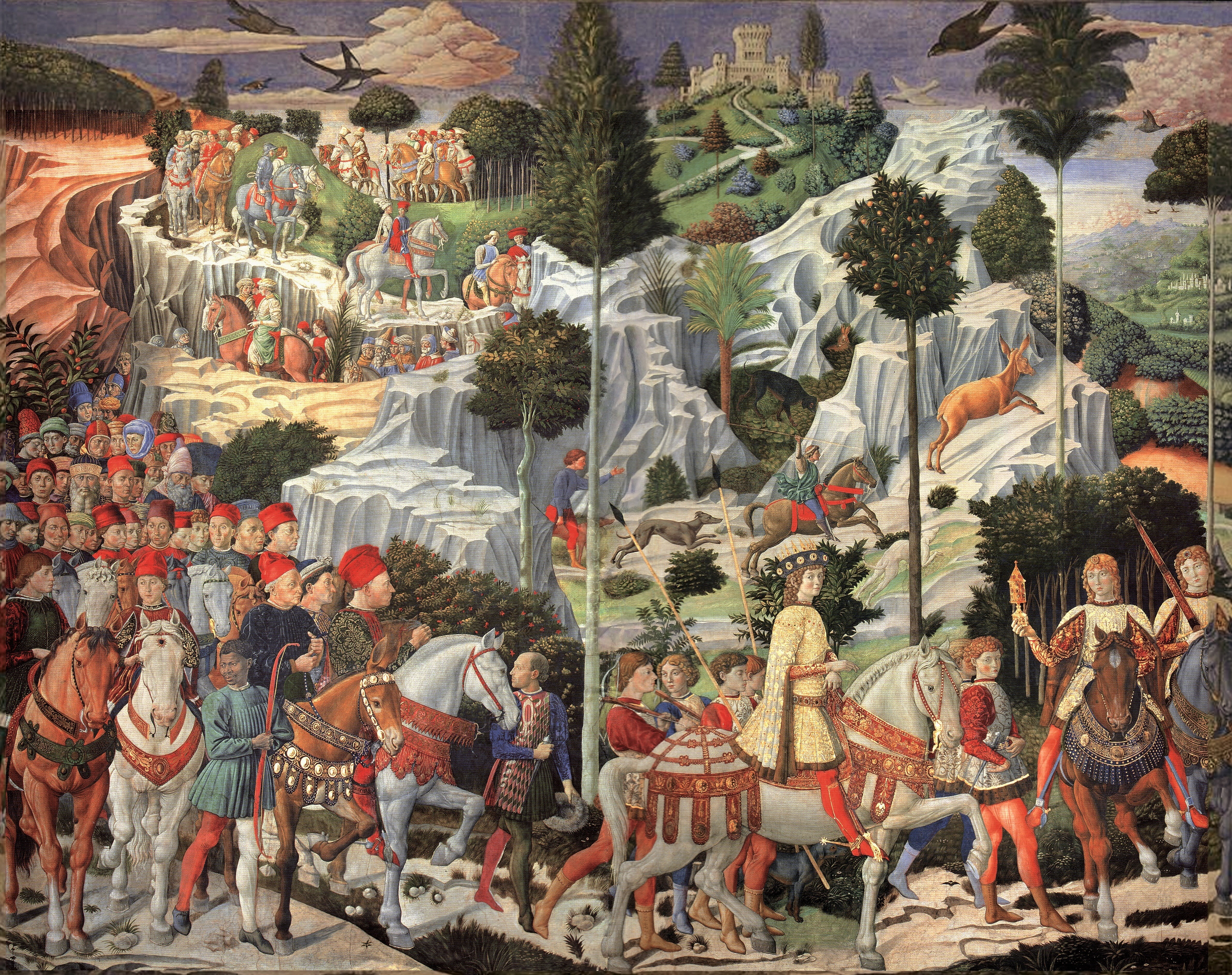
August 26: Ethiopian Christians arrive at Council of Florence to join the nations represented (From Procession of the Magi by Benozzo Gozzoli (1459))

1441 (MCDXLI) was a common year starting on Sunday of the Julian calendar, the 1441st year of the Common Era (CE) and Anno Domini (AD) designations, the 441st year of the 2nd millennium, the 41st year of the 15th century, and the 2nd year of the 1440s decade. As of the start of 1441, the Gregorian calendar was 9 days ahead of the Julian calendar, which was the dominant calendar of the time.

== Events ==
=== January–March ===
- January 20 – The siege of Tartas in France is temporarily halted when Charles II of Albret, against whom residents of Gascony are campaigning, and the commander of the English forces, Sir Thomas Rempston, agree to a three-month truce.
- February 7 – Luchuan–Pingmian campaigns: In Ming dynasty China, the Vice Minister of Justice, He Wenyuan, petitions the Imperial Court not to make a second punitive campaign against the kingdom of Möng Mao and its ruler, Si Renfa, arguing that the nation's resources should not be wasted on worthless land. The Minister of War, Wang Ji, joins with General Mu Ang in arguing that Si Renfa should be stopped before he conquers more territory. The Emperor authorizes the second campaign.
- February 12 – King's College, Cambridge, is founded by King Henry VI of England.
- February 24 – The Republic of Venice annexes the seigniory of Ravenna, ending the da Polenta Dynasty.
- February 25 – Elizabeth of Luxembourg , widow of the late King Albert of Hungary presents the Crown of St. Stephen to Frederick, King of Germany and invites him to take the throne, although Hungary's nobles had elected King Władysław III of Poland as King Laszlo of Hungary.
- February 27 – Luchuan–Pingmian campaigns: The second campaign against the Mong Mao state is launched.
- March 1 – Battle of Samobor: The army of Ulrich II, Count of Celje, defeats the army of Stjepan Banić at Samobor, Croatia in union with Hungary.
- March 17 – The Swiss Canton of Bern intervenes to block an agreement between the Canton of Zürich that would have ceded the town of Grüningen to the Habsburg family of Germany.
- March 19 – Isidore of Kiev, the Russian Orthodox Church Metropolitan of Kiev and all Russia, returns to his home in Moscow after having attended the Council of Florence, where he agreed to unify the Russian Church with the Roman Catholic Church. When he arrives, he is arrested on the order of Grand Prince Vasily II and imprisoned under minimum security.

=== April–June ===
- April 1 – Prince Carlos of Viana legally becomes the King of Navarre in Spain upon the death of his mother, Queen Blanca, who had ruled since 1425.
- April 20 — The Council of Florence, led by Pope Eugene IV, declares that the members of the Council of Basel are heretics and votes to excommunicate them, as well as affirming the superiority of the Pope over the Councils in the bull Etsi non dubitemus. In 1440, the Council of Basel had declared Eugene IV to be a heretic, deposed him as Pope, and excommunicated him.
- April 26 — Pope Eugene IV orders the transfer of the Council of Florence to Rome
- May 3 – In Denmark, a rebel army of 25,000 peasants led by Henrik Reventlow repels an attack by Swedish nobles, led by Eske Jensen Brock. The peasants prepare a trap near their camp at St. Jørgensbjerg before the Battle of St. Jorgen's Hill, placing trees and soil over a swamp, and Brock's army of knights becomes mired down, where almost all (including Brock) are slaughtered.
- May 8 – The Siege of Creil is Started on orders of King Charles VII of France against the English held town and council. William Peyto surrenders on May 25.
- June 6 – The siege of Pontoise is started by with 5,000 troops led by King Charles VII of France and Arthur de Richemont, Duke of Brittany, to capture a 1,200 member English Army garrison located on the Île-de-France near Paris. The siege continues for three months until the garrison surrenders.
- June 7 – The University of Bordeaux is established by Pope Eugene IV while Bordeaux is under the control of France."Ressources". Université de Bordeaux. 27 February 2024. Archived from the original on 4 June 2022. Closed in 1793 during the French Revolution, it will reopen in 1896 and continue to be in existence 280 years later.
- June 27 – The siege of Novo Brdo in Serbia ends after eight months as Ottoman Empire troops, led by the Sultan Murad II and General Hadım Şehabeddin guarantee the safe evacuation of the surviving Ragusan defenders, accept the Serbian surrender.

=== July–September ===
- July 12 ((Kakitsu 1, 24th day of the 6th month) – In Japan, the Shōgun Ashikaga Yoshinori is murdered by Akamatsu Mitsusuke, who is upset that Ashikaga has made Akamatsu Sadaura leader of the Akamatsu clan. Over the next 16 days, several prominent nobles allied with Ashikaga are killed during the fighting including Kyōgoku Takakazu, the Shugo of Yamashiro Province and Ōuchi Mochiyo (1394–1441), the head of the Ōuchi clan. After the fighting ceases, Yoshinori's 8-year-old son, Ashikaga Yoshikatsu, is proclaimed as the new shōgun.
- July 23 – Abū r-Rabīʿ Sulaymān al-Mustakfī bi-Llāh, or Al-Mustakfi II, becomes the new Caliph of Cairo upon the death of his father, Al-Mu'tadid II.
- August 15 – King Afonso V of Portugal, the 9-year-old monarch since the 1438 death of his father, King Duarte, is formally betrothed to his cousin, Isabel of Coimbra, aged 10, as part of an arranged marriage planned by Isabel's father Pedro, Duke of Coimbra, the King's regent. Their marriage does not take place until almost six years later, on May 6, 1447.
- August 26 – Bishop Alberto da Sarteano, who had been sent by the Vatican on a mission to seek the Ethiopian Coptic Christian Church to join with the Roman Catholic Church, returns to Rome with four Ethiopians who had been allowed to leave by the Emperor Zara Yaqob. Two of the visitors the attend the Council of Florence to discuss the possible union of Coptic Orthodoxy and the Latin Church, marking the earliest recorded contact of the Ethiopian Coptic Church with Europe.
- September 6 – The Dutch–Hanseatic War concludes with the Treaty of Copenhagen.

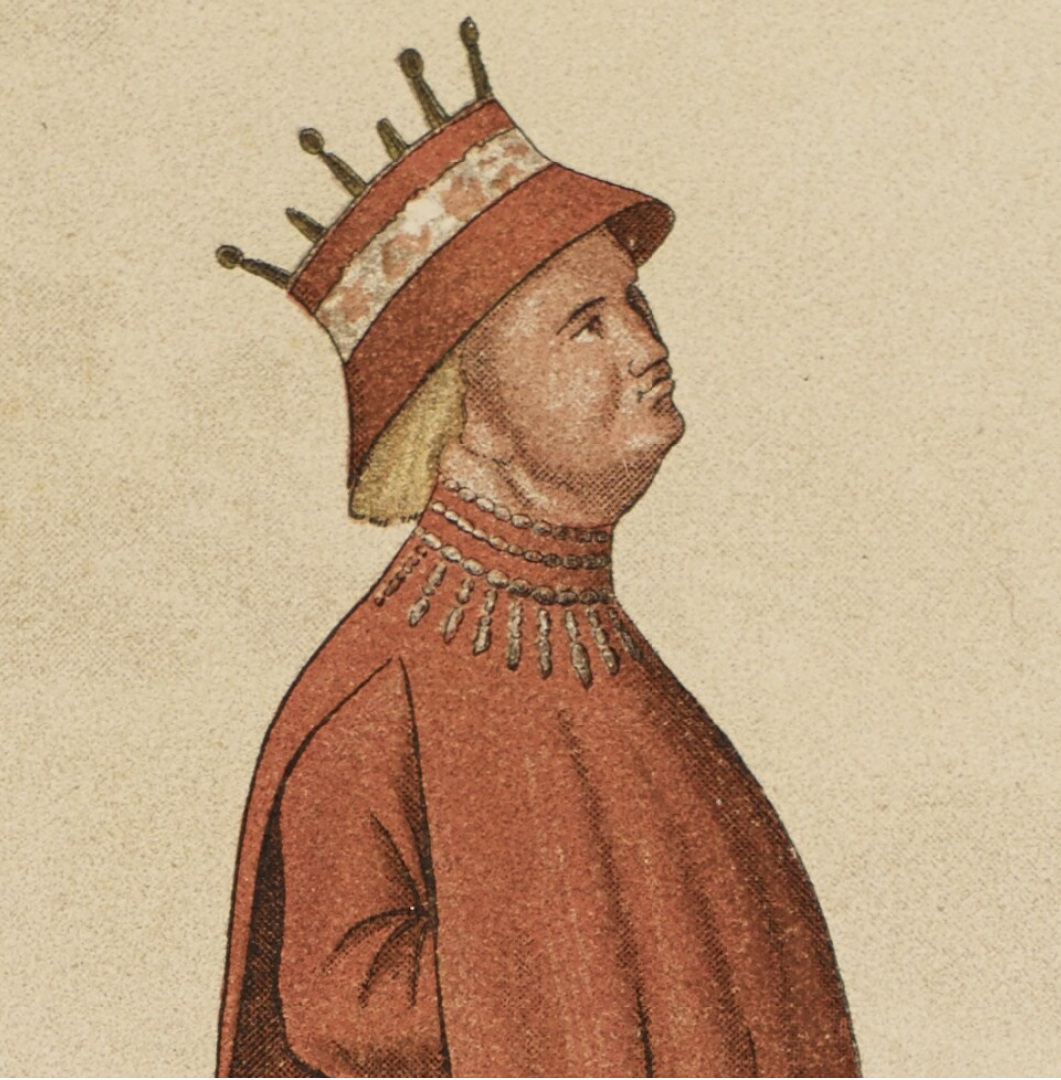
King Cristoffer of Sweden

- September 13 — The coronation of King Christopher II of Denmark as King Cristoffer of Sweden takes place in Uppsala.
- September 15 – The Metropolitan Isidore of Kiev is allowed by Grand Prince Vasily II to escape from imprisonment in Moscow, along with two of his disciples, Gregory the Bulgarian and Afanasy. He flees to Tver and then to Novogrudok and eventually to Rome.
- September 19 – The siege of Pontoise ends after four months, following a three-day final assault led by Marshal André de Laval-Montmorency and Jean de Bueil, Count of Sancerre of the French Army. More than 400 of the English defenders are killed, and hundreds of survivors taken prisoner, including their commander, Baron Clinton. Because Pontoise was not surrendered, the property of the survivors is seized by the French and Clinton and most of his officers are held hostage until a ransom is paid. The English soldiers are not ransomed and are drowned in public instead.

=== October–December ===
- October 2 – (16 Jumada I, 845 AH) In what is now Saudi Arabia, Ali ibn Hasan ibn Ajlan is appointed as the new Emir of Mecca by the Mamluk Sultanate and his brother Barakat ibn Hasan is deposed, but the news does not reach Barakat for nearly two months.
- October 4 – Pope Eugene IV issues a papal bull to recognize the Order of St Ambrose.
- October 25 – In accordance with the proposals for the Peace of Cremona to end the war between Venice and Milan, Francesco I Sforza of Venice marries Bianca Maria Visconti, daughter of the Duke of Milan. An Italian tradition credits the creation of nougat to the celebration of the wedding.
- November 10 – Alfonso V of Aragon lays siege to Naples.
- November 20 – The Peace of Cremona (1441) ends the war between the Republic of Venice and the Duchy of Milan.
- November 29 – (14 Rajab 845 AH) Barakat ibn Hasan learns that he is deposed as Emir of Mecca and leaves that evening.
- December 3 – King Henry VI summons the members of the English Parliament to assemble at Westminster on January 25.
- December 16 – (2 Sha'ban 845 AH) Ali ibn Hasan ibn Ajlan takes office as the new Emir of Mecca.

=== Date unknown ===
- Ouagadougou becomes the capital of the Mossi Kingdoms.
- A revolt occurs in the Mayan nation of Mayapan; the Maya civilization splits into warring city-states.
- With the help of the Grand Duchy of Lithuania, governor Hacı I Giray declares his province independent of the Golden Horde and establishes the Crimean Khanate.
- Nuno Tristão reaches the Ras Nouadhibou (Cabo Branco) on the western coast of Africa. This is probably the first voyage where a caravel is used for maritime exploration.
- The first enslaved black Africans are brought to Europe at Lagos in the Kingdom of Portugal.

== Births ==
- February 9 – Ali-Shir Nava'i, Central Asian poet, politician and writer (d. 1501)
- March 24 – Ernest, Elector of Saxony, German ruler of Saxony (d. 1486)
- June 25 – Federico I Gonzaga, Marquess of Mantua (1478–1484) (d. 1484)
- June 27 – John III, Count of Nassau-Weilburg, German nobleman (d. 1480)
- July 23 – Danjong of Joseon, King of Joseon (d. 1457)
- November 11 – Charlotte of Savoy, French queen (d. 1483)

== Deaths ==
- March 8 – Margaret of Burgundy, Duchess of Bavaria
- April 1 – Blanche I of Navarre, Queen of Navarre (1425–1441) and Regent of Sicily (1404–1405 and 1408–1415)
- June 14 – Corrado IV Trinci, former lord of Foligno
- July 9 – Jan van Eyck, Dutch painter
- July 12 – Kyōgoku Takakazu, Japanese noble and vassal of Ashikaga Yoshinori
- July 12 – Ashikaga Yoshinori, Japanese shōgun (b. 1394)
- September 25 – Akamatsu Mitsusuke, Japanese samurai
- October 24 – Adolf, Duke of Bavaria (b. 1434)
- October 27 – Margery Jourdemayne, Englishwoman executed for treasonable witchcraft
- November 18 – Roger Bolingbroke, English cleric, astronomer, astrologer, magister and alleged necromancer
- December 26 – Niccolò III d'Este, Marquis of Ferrara (b. 1383)
