= Emperor Go-Hanazono =

Emperor of Japan from 1428 to 1464

Emperor Go-Hanazono 後花園天皇
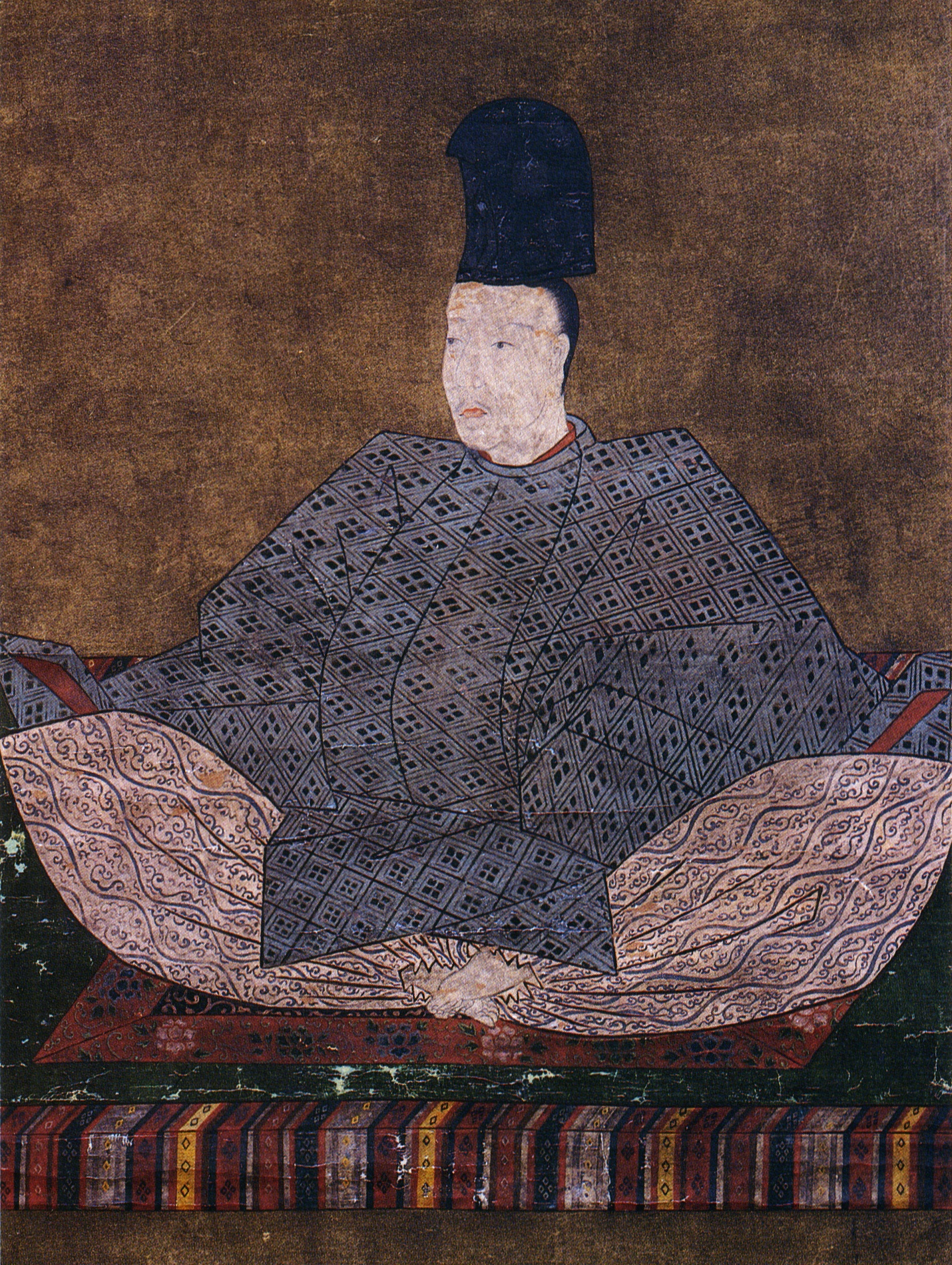
- Portrait from the Edo Period

Emperor of Japan
- Reign: September 7, 1428 – August 21, 1464
- Enthronement: January 21, 1430
- Predecessor: Shōkō
- Successor: Go-Tsuchimikado
- Shōgun: Ashikaga Yoshinori; Ashikaga Yoshikatsu; Ashikaga Yoshimasa
- Born: Hikohito (彦仁); July 10, 1419; Shigeari Niwata's mansion
- Died: 18 January 1471 (aged 51); Muromachi-dai Izumi-dono (室町第泉殿)
- Burial: Nochi no Yamakuni no Misasagi (後山國陵) (Kyoto)
- Issue: Princess Kanshin; Emperor Go-Tsuchimikado; Princess Shinjoji; Princess Shogon
Posthumous name
- Tsuigō: Emperor Go-Hanazono (後花園院 or 後花園天皇)
- House: Imperial House of Japan (Fushimi branch)
- Father: Prince Sadafusa
- Mother: Niwata Sachiko
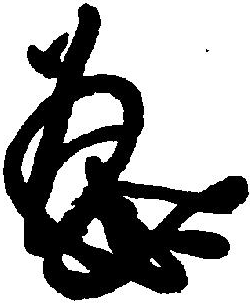
- Signature

Emperor Go-Hanazono (後花園天皇, Go-Hanazono-tennō) (July 10, 1419 – January 18, 1471) was the 102nd emperor of Japan, according to the traditional order of succession. His reign spanned the years from 1428 through 1464.

This 15th-century sovereign was named after the 14th-century Emperor Hanazono and go- (後) translates as "later", and thus, he could be called the "Later Emperor Hanazono", or in some older sources, may be identified as "Hanazono, the second" or as "Hanazono II".

== Genealogy ==
Before his ascension to the Chrysanthemum Throne, his personal name (imina) was simply Hikohito-shinnō (彦仁親王).

He was the eldest son of Imperial Prince Fushimi-no-miya Sadafusa (伏見宮貞成親王) (1372–1456). His mother was Sachiko (幸子) (1390–1448), daughter of Niwata Tsuneari (庭田経有).

His father was the 3rd of the Fushimi-no-miya line and grandson of the Northern Pretender Emperor Sukō, making Go-Hanazono the great-grandson of Sukō and 3rd cousin to his predecessor, Emperor Shōkō. He was also the great-great-great grandson of Emperor Go-Fushimi. This is the second most remote relationship between an emperor and his successor after that between Emperor Go-Komatsu (both the sixth Northern Pretender and the 100th in the main line) and his predecessor in the official line, Emperor Go-Kameyama, who was his fourth cousin twice removed.

=== Issue ===
- Consort: Ōinomikado (Fujiwara) Nobuko (大炊御門（藤原）信子; 1411–1488) later Karakumon-in (嘉楽門院), Fujiwara Takanaga’s daughter
  - First daughter: Princess Kanshin (1434–1490; 観心女王)
  - First son: Imperial Prince Fusahito (成仁親王) later Emperor Go-Tsuchimikado
- Lady-in-waiting: Hino (Fujiwara) Kyoko (日野（藤原）郷子), Hino Hidemitsu’s daughter
  - daughter: Princess Shinjoji (真乗寺宮; d.1482)
- Lady-in-waiting: Sanjo (Fujiwara) Fuyuko (三条 (藤原）冬子; 1441–1489), Sanjo Sanekazu’s daughter
- unknown
  - Daughter: Princess Shogon (d.1464)

== Events of Go-Hanazono's life ==
Because the previous emperor, Emperor Shōkō had no son, retired Emperor Go-Komatsu needed to secure the Jimyōin inheritance against the Daikakuji line, before Emperor Shōkō died, he adopted a son out of the Fushimi-no-miya house, who became Emperor Go-Hanazono after Shōkō's death.

- 1428 (Shōchō 1, 20th day of the 7th month): In the 17th year of Shōkō-tennō's reign (称光天皇十七年), the emperor died at age 27; and the succession (senso) was received by his adopted son.
- Shōchō 1, on the 29th day of the 7th month (1428): Emperor Go-Hanazono is said to have acceded to the throne (sokui). The new emperor is age 10.
- 1429 (Eikyō 1, 9th day of the 3rd month): Minamoto-no Yoshinobu is honored in court; and thereafter, he is known as Shōgun Ashikaga Yoshinori.
- 1433 (Eikyō 5, 6th month): The Emperor of China, at that time the Xuande Emperor, addressed a letter to Yoshinori in which he gave the Shōgun the title, "King of Japan."
- 1441 (Kakitsu 1, 24th day of the 6th month): Shōgun Yoshinori is murdered at age 48 by Akamatsu Mitsusuke; and shortly thereafter, his 8-year-old son, Ashikaga Yoshikatsu, is proclaimed as the new Shogun.
- 1441 (Kakitsu 1, 9th month): The assassins of Yoshinori kill themselves.
- 1442 (Kakitsu 3, 21 day of the 7th month): Shōgun Yoshikatsu died at the age of 10. He enjoyed riding horses; but he was gravely injured in a fall from a horse, and died as a result. He was shōgun for only three years. His 8-year-old brother, Yoshinari, was then named shogun.
- 1443 (Kakitsu 3, 23rd day of the 9th month).: An armed group of rebels penetrated the palace defenses. A fire was started and one of the men sought to kill Go-Hanazono, but the emperor escaped. However, the intruders managed to steal the Three Sacred Treasures: the mirror, the sword and the jewel. Later, a guard found the mirror and a priest found the sword, but the location of the jewel was not known until the 8th month of the starting year of the Bun'an-era (1444).
- 1451 (Hōtoku 3, 7th month ): A delegation from the Ryukyu Islands arrives for the first time in Heian-kyō (Kyoto).
- 1451 (Hōtoku 3, 8th month ): Shōgun Yoshinari sent a letter to the Emperor of China, at that time, the Jingtai Emperor.
- 1453 (Kyōtoku 2, 6th month): The name of Shōgun Minamoto-no Yoshinari was changed to Ashikaga Yoshimasa.
- 1458 (Chōroku 2, 8th month): The Sacred Jewel is retrieved from the former Southern Court. It is returned to Miyako to join the other Sacred Treasures.
- 1464 (Kanshō 5, 7th month): Go-Hanazono resigned his throne in favor of his son, who would be known as Emperor Go-Tsuchimikado.

Until former-Emperor Go-Komatsu died in 1433, Emperor Go-Hanazono held the title of formal head of the Dairi, the real power in the court was wielded by his uncle, who continued a practice known as cloistered rule. After this, Go-Hanazono enjoyed 30 years of direct imperial rule, until his abdication on August 21, 1464, when the conventional pattern of indirect government by cloistered emperors was again resumed.

- January 18, 1471 (Bunmei 3, 12th month): Former Emperor Go-Hanazono died at age 52.

=== Kugyō ===
Kugyō (公卿) is a collective term for the very few most powerful men attached to the court of the Emperor of Japan in pre-Meiji eras. Even during those years in which the court's actual influence outside the palace walls was minimal, the hierarchic organization persisted.

In general, this elite group included only three to four men at a time. These were hereditary courtiers whose experience and background would have brought them to the pinnacle of a life's career. During Go-Hanazono's reign, this apex of the Daijō-kan included:

- Sesshō (Regent for a minor Emperor):
  - Nijō (Fujiwara) Mochimoto (1428–1432)
  - Ichijō (Fujiwara) Kaneyoshi (1432)
  - Nijō (Fujiwara) Mochimoto (second time, 1432–1433)
- Kampaku (Regent for an adult Emperor):
  - Nijō (Fujiwara) Mochimoto (continued, 1433–1445)
  - Konoe (Fujiwara) Fusatsugu (1445–1447)
  - Ichijō (Fujiwara) Kaneyoshi (1447–1453)
  - Nijō (Fujiwara) Mochimichi (1453–1454)
  - Takatsukasa (Fujiwara) Fusahira (1454–1455)
  - Nijō (Fujiwara) Mochimichi (second time, 1455–1459)
  - Ichijō (Fujiwara) Norifusa (1459–1463)
  - Nijō (Fujiwara) Mochimichi (third time, 1463–1467)
- Daijō-daijin (Chancellor):
  - Nijō (Fujiwara) Mochimoto (1432–1433)
  - Ichijō (Fujiwara) Kaneyoshi (1446–1450)
  - Koga (Minamoto) Kiyomichi (1452–1453)
  - Saionji (Fujiwara) Kinna (1455–1457)
  - Nijō (Fujiwara) Mochimichi (1458–1460)
  - Konoe (Fujiwara) Fusatsugu (1462)
- Sadaijin (Minister of the Left):
  - Nijō (Fujiwara) Mochimoto (1427–1429)
  - Ichijō (Fujiwara) Kaneyoshi (1429–1432)
  - Shōgun Ashikaga (Minamoto) Yoshinori (1432–1438)
  - Konoe (Fujiwara) Fusatsugu (1438–1446)
  - Takatsukasa (Fujiwara) Fusahira (1446–1455)
  - Tōin (Fujiwara) Sanehiro (1455–1457)
  - Ichijō (Fujiwara) Norifusa (1457–1460)
  - Sanjō (Fujiwara) Sanekazu (1460)
  - Shōgun Ashikaga (Minamoto) Yoshimasa (1460–1467)
- Udaijin (Minister of the Right):
  - Ichijō (Fujiwara) Kaneyoshi (1424–1429)
  - Konoe (Fujiwara) Fusatsugu (1429–1438)
  - Takatsukasa (Fujiwara) Fusahira (1438–1446)
  - Nijō (Fujiwara) Mochimichi (1446–1454)
  - Tōin (Fujiwara) Sanehiro (1454–1455)
  - Ichijō (Fujiwara) Norifusa (1455–1457)
  - Sanjō (Fujiwara) Sanekazu (1457)
  - Konoe (Fujiwara) Norimoto (1457–1462)
  - Tokudaiji (Fujiwara) Kin'ari (1462–1464)
- Naidaijin (Minister of the Center):
  - Konoe (Fujiwara) Fusatsugu (1426–1429)
  - Koga (Minamoto) Kiyomichi (1429–1432)
  - Shōgun Ashikaga (Minamoto) Yoshinori (1432)
  - Ooinomikado (Fujiwara) Nobumune (1432–1433)
  - Takatsukasa (Fujiwara) Fusahira (1435–1438)
  - Saionji (Fujiwara) Kinna (1438–1441)
  - Kasannoin (Fujiwara) Mochitada (1442–1443)
  - Madenokōji (Fujiwara) Tokifusa (1446)
  - Tōin (Fujiwara) Sanehiro (1446–1450)
  - Sanjōnishi (Fujiwara) Kimiyasu (1450)
  - Sanjō (Fujiwara) Sanekazu (1450–1452)
  - Ichijō (Fujiwara) Norifusa (1452–1455)
  - Konoe (Fujiwara) Norimoto (1455–1457)
  - Oogimachisanjō (Fujiwara) Sanemasa (1457–1458)
  - Shōgun Ashikaga (Minamoto) Yoshimasa (1458–1460)
  - Tokudaiji (Fujiwara) Kin'ari (1460–1461)
  - Koga (Minamoto) Michihiro (1461–1464)
  - Kujō (Fujiwara) Masatada (1464–1465)

== Eras of Go-Hanazono's reign ==
The years of Go-Hanozono's reign are more specifically identified by more than one era name or nengō. Go-Hanazono's reign is almost unique because of its eight successive eras; and only the turbulent years of Emperor Go-Daigo's reign included as many eras.

- Shōchō (1428–1429)
- Eikyō (1429–1441)
- Kakitsu (1441–1444)
- Bun'an (1444–1449)
- Hōtoku (1449–1452)
- Kyōtoku (1452–1455)
- Kōshō (1455–1457)
- Chōroku (1457–1460)
- Kanshō (1460–1466)

== Ancestry ==
Ancestors of Emperor Go-Hanazono

8. Emperor Sukō (1334-1398)
4. Prince of the Blood Fushimi-no-miya Yoshihito (1351-1416)
9. Niwata Motoko (d. 1394)
2. Prince of the Blood Fushimi-no-miya Sadafusa (1372-1456)
10. Sanjō Saneharu (1292-1353)
5. Ōgimachisanjō Haruko (d. 1399)
1. Emperor Go-Hanazono
12. Niwata Shigesuke (1306-1389)
6. Niwata Tsuneari (d. 1412)
3. Niwata Sachiko (1390-1448)
14. Asukai Masafuyu
7. Asukai

== Notes ==
Japanese Imperial kamon — a stylized chrysanthemum blossom

== See also ==
- Emperor of Japan
- List of Emperors of Japan
- Imperial cult

Regnal titles
Preceded by Emperor Shōkō	Emperor of Japan: Go-Hanozano; 1428–1464	Succeeded by Emperor Go-Tsuchimikado
