= Bun'an =

Period of Japanese history (1444–1449)

Bun'an (文安) was a Japanese era name (年号, nengō; lit. "year name") after Kakitsu and before Hotoku. This period spanned the years from February 1444 through July 1449. The reigning emperor was Go-Hanazono-tennō (後花園天皇).

== Change of era ==
- 1444 Bun'an gannen (文安元年): The era name was changed to mark an event or a number of events. The previous era ended and a new one commenced in Kakitsu 4.

== Events of the Bun'an era ==
- 1444 (Bun'an 1, 1st month): Yoshinari made his first visit to Kanrei Hatakeyama Motokuni; and on this occasion, all the avenues along the route to and from the meeting were highly guarded.
- 1444 (Bun'an 1, 4th month): The inhabitants of the eastern part of the capital and the western part of the capital each demanded exclusive rights to sell the dregs remaining from sake brewing. Crowds gathered at the Shinto shrine, Kitano Tenman-gū. Kanrei Motokuni sent troops to arrest the troublemakers, but they all escaped after having reduced the temple and much of western Kyoto to cinders.
- 1444 (Bun'an 1, 8th month): One of the Three Sacred Treasures was found after it had been missing for several months. The Sacred Jewel had been stolen in Kakitsu 3, on the 23rd day of the 9th month. Intruders in the palace had managed to steal all of the Sacred Treasures – the mirror, the sword and the jewel. Later, a guard found the mirror and a priest found the sword, but the location of the jewel remained unknown until the 8th month of Bun'an gannen.
- 1445 (Bun'an 2, 11th month): The kampaku Nijō Mochimoto died at age 48. Konoe Fusatsugu and Ichijō Kaneyoshi became the two primary contenders for this newly vacated position. The emperor sought Kanrei Motokuni's counsel before naming Fusatsugu to be the new kampaku. The dainagon Fujiwara Tokifusa becomes naidaijin.
- 1445 (Bun'an 2, 11th month): Hosokawa Katsumoto was named kanrei at the age of 12.
- 1446 (Bun'an 3, 11th month): The kampaku Fusatsugu asked the emperor to relieve him of his position as sadaijin. The udaijin Takakasa Fusahira succeeded Fusatsugu as sadaijin; and the dainagon Nijō Mochimichi became udaijin.
- 1446 (Bun'an 3, 11th month): The shōgun received a patent from the emperor by which he learned that his name of "Yoshinari" had received Imperial approval.
- 1447 (Bun'an 4, 11th month): Yoshinari exercised regularly to improve the accuracy of his archery, and his arrows began to hit the center of the target sometimes.
- 1448 (Bun'an 5, i2nd month): The emperor moved in procession to visit his father; and the entire route was guarded by the troops of Hosokawa Katsumoto.

== Notes ==
Preceded by Kakitsu	Era or nengō Bun'an; 1444–1449	Succeeded by Hotoku
