= July 12 =

July 12 this year in various calendars
- Sunday, 12 July 2026
Akan	Nkyikwasi
Armenian	27 Hrotich 1475
Aztec	Quecholli 3, 2 Ozomahtli
Babylonian	26 Simanu, 2337 SE
Balinese pawukon	Luang, Pepet, Kajeng, Sri, Keliwon, Urukung, Redite of Pujut, Sri, Erangan, Duka
Bengali	28 Asharh, BS 1433
Chinese	Yin Fire Pig・Hairy Head Mansion; Fire Horse Year, Month 5, Day 28 (Xiaoshu, 11 days until Dashu)
Common Era	12 July 2026 CE
Coptic	5 Epip, AM 1742
Egyptian	27 Athyr, 2775 NE
Ethiopian	5 Ḥamlē, 2018 Amätä Məhrät
French Republican	Décade III, Quartidi de Messidor de l'Année 234 de la République
Gregorian	12 July, AD 2026
Hebrew	27 Tamuz, AM 5786
Hindu	Rohiṇi・Vṛddhi; Solar: 28 Āṣāḍha, 1948 SE; Lunisolar: Trayodaśī, Kṛishna pakṣa of Jyeṣṭha, 2083 VE; Rāudra・5127 KY・1,872,768
Icelandic	Sunnudagur, 21 Sólmánuður 2026
Islamic	26 Muharram, AH 1448 (using tabular method)
ISO week date	2026-W28-7
Japanese	28 Satsuki, Reiwa 8 (Shōsho, 11 days until Taisho)
Julian	29 June, AD 2026 (AM 7534)
Julian day	2461234
Korean	28 Maldal, 4359 DE
Maya	13.0.13.13.11; 4 Xul, 2 Chuen
Roman	ante diem III Kalendas Iulias, MMDCCLXXIX AUC
Solar Hijri	21 Tir, SH 1405
Tibetan	28 snron, me pho rta 2153 or 1772 or 1000

<<	July					>>
Su	Mo	Tu	We	Th	Fr	Sa
			1	2	3	4
5	6	7	8	9	10	11
12	13	14	15	16	17	18
19	20	21	22	23	24	25
26	27	28	29	30	31
2026

July 12 in recent years
2026 (Sunday)
2025 (Saturday)
2024 (Friday)
2023 (Wednesday)
2022 (Tuesday)
2021 (Monday)
2020 (Sunday)
2019 (Friday)
2018 (Thursday)
2017 (Wednesday)

July 12 is the 193rd day of the year (194th in leap years) in the Gregorian calendar; 172 days remain until the end of the year.

== Events ==
=== Pre-1600 ===
- 70 – The armies of Titus attack the walls of Jerusalem after a six-month siege. Three days later they breach the walls, which enables the army to destroy the Second Temple.
- 526 – Election of Pope Felix IV following the death of Pope John I earlier that year.
- 813 – Leo V the Armenian is crowned as Byzantine Emperor after he successfully forced previous emperor Michael I Rangabe to abdicate the previous day.
- 927 – King Constantine II of Scotland, King Hywel Dda of Deheubarth, Ealdred of Bamburgh and King Owain of the Cumbrians accept the overlordship of King Æthelstan of England, leading to seven years of peace in the north.
- 1191 – Third Crusade: Saladin's garrison surrenders to Philip Augustus, ending the two-year siege of Acre.
- 1335 – Pope Benedict XII issues the papal bull Fulgens sicut stella matutina to reform the Cistercian Order.
- 1450 – Although he had been previously pardoned, Jack Cade is killed while fleeing, bringing an end to Jack Cade's Rebellion.
- 1470 – The Ottomans capture Euboea.
- 1488 – Joseon Dynasty official Choe Bu returns to Korea after months of shipwrecked travel in China.
- 1493 – Hartmann Schedel's Nuremberg Chronicle, one of the best-documented early printed books, is published.
- 1527 – Lê Cung Hoàng cedes the throne to Mạc Đăng Dung, ending the Lê dynasty and starting the Mạc dynasty.
- 1543 – King Henry VIII of England marries his sixth and last wife, Catherine Parr, at Hampton Court Palace.
- 1562 – Fray Diego de Landa, acting Bishop of Yucatán, burns the sacred idols and books of the Maya.
- 1576 – Mughal Empire annexes Bengal after defeating the Bengal Sultanate at the Battle of Rajmahal.
- 1580 – The Ostrog Bible, one of the early printed Bibles in a Slavic language, is published.

=== 1601–1900 ===
- 1691 – Battle of Aughrim (Julian calendar): The decisive victory of William III of England's forces in Ireland.
- 1776 – Captain James Cook begins his third voyage.
- 1789 – In response to the dismissal of the French finance minister Jacques Necker, the radical journalist Camille Desmoulins gives a speech which results in the storming of the Bastille two days later.
- 1790 – The Civil Constitution of the Clergy is passed in France by the National Constituent Assembly.
- 1799 – Ranjit Singh conquers Lahore and becomes Maharaja of the Punjab (Sikh Empire).
- 1801 – British ships inflict heavy damage on Spanish and French ships in the Second Battle of Algeciras.
- 1806 – At the insistence of Napoleon, Bavaria, Baden, Württemberg and thirteen minor principalities leave the Holy Roman Empire and form the Confederation of the Rhine.
- 1812 – The American Army of the Northwest briefly occupies the Upper Canadian settlement at what is now at Windsor, Ontario.
- 1847 – A riot occurs in Woodstock, New Brunswick, between Catholics and members of the Orange Order that results in up to ten deaths.
- 1862 – The Medal of Honor is authorized by the United States Congress.

=== 1901–present ===
- 1913 – Serbian forces begin their siege of the Bulgarian city of Vidin; the siege is later called off when the war ends.
- 1913 – The Second Revolution breaks out against the Beiyang government, as Li Liejun proclaims Jiangxi independent from the Republic of China.
- 1917 – The Bisbee Deportation occurs as vigilantes kidnap and deport nearly 1,300 striking miners and others from Bisbee, Arizona.
- 1918 – The Imperial Japanese Navy battleship Kawachi blows up at Shunan, western Honshu, Japan, killing at least 621.
- 1920 – The Soviet–Lithuanian Peace Treaty is signed, by which Soviet Russia recognizes the independence of Lithuania.
- 1943 – World War II: Battle of Kursk: German and Soviet forces engage in the Battle of Prokhorovka, one of the largest armored engagements of all time.
- 1948 – Israeli Prime Minister David Ben-Gurion orders the expulsion of Palestinians from the towns of Lod and Ramla.
- 1960 – Orlyonok, the main Young Pioneer camp of the Russian SFSR, is founded.
- 1961 – Indian city Pune floods due to failure of the Khadakwasla and Panshet dams, killing at least two thousand people.
- 1961 – ČSA Flight 511 crashes at Casablanca–Anfa Airport in Morocco, killing 72.
- 1963 – Pauline Reade, 16, disappears in Gorton, England, the first victim in the Moors murders.
- 1967 – Riots begin in Newark, New Jersey.
- 1971 – The Australian Aboriginal flag is flown for the first time.
- 1973 – A fire destroys the entire sixth floor of the National Personnel Records Center of the United States.
- 1975 – São Tomé and Príncipe declare independence from Portugal.
- 1979 – The island nation of Kiribati becomes independent from the United Kingdom.
- 1995 – Chinese seismologists successfully predict the 1995 Myanmar–China earthquake, reducing the number of casualties to 11.
- 1998 – The Ulster Volunteer Force attack a house in Ballymoney, County Antrim, Northern Ireland with a petrol bomb, killing the Quinn brothers.
- 1998 – France win their first World Cup title, defeating defending champions Brazil 3–0.
- 2001 – Space Shuttle program: Space Shuttle Atlantis is launched on mission STS-104, carrying the Quest Joint Airlock to the International Space Station.
- 2006 – A cross-border raid by Hezbollah militants starts the 2006 Lebanon War.
- 2007 – U.S. Army Apache helicopters engage in airstrikes against armed insurgents in Baghdad, Iraq, where civilians are killed; footage from the cockpit is later leaked to the Internet.
- 2012 – Syrian Civil War: Government forces target the homes of rebels and activists in Tremseh and kill anywhere between 68 and 150 people.
- 2012 – A tank truck explosion kills more than 100 people in Okobie, Nigeria.
- 2013 – Six people are killed and 200 injured in a French passenger train derailment in Brétigny-sur-Orge.
- 2024 – Gazpromavia Flight 9608 crashes in Russia's Kolomensky District near Kolomna, killing three.
- 2026 – A bar fire kills 33 people in Bangkok, Thailand.

== Births ==
=== Pre-1600 ===
- 100 BC – Julius Caesar, Roman politician and general (died 44 BC)
- 1394 – Ashikaga Yoshinori, Japanese shōgun (died 1441)
- 1468 – Juan del Encina, Spanish poet, playwright, and composer (probable; (died 1530)
- 1477 – Jacopo Sadoleto, Italian cardinal (died 1547)
- 1549 – Edward Manners, 3rd Earl of Rutland (died 1587)

=== 1601–1900 ===
- 1628 – Henry Howard, 6th Duke of Norfolk (died 1684)
- 1675 – Evaristo Felice Dall'Abaco, Italian violinist and composer (died 1742)
- 1730 – Josiah Wedgwood, English potter, founded the Wedgwood Company (died 1795)
- 1803 – Peter Chanel, French priest and saint (died 1841)
- 1807 – Thomas Hawksley, English engineer and academic (died 1893)
- 1813 – Claude Bernard, French physiologist and academic (died 1878)
- 1817 – Henry David Thoreau, American essayist, poet, and philosopher (died 1862)
- 1817 – Alvin Saunders, Territorial Governor and Senator from Nebraska (died 1899)
- 1821 – D. H. Hill, American general and academic (died 1889)
- 1824 – Eugène Boudin, French painter (died 1898)
- 1849 – William Osler, Canadian physician and author (died 1919)
- 1850 – Otto Schoetensack, German anthropologist and academic (died 1912)
- 1852 – Hipólito Yrigoyen, Argentinian lawyer and politician, 19th President of Argentina (died 1933)
- 1854 – George Eastman, American businessman, founded Eastman Kodak (died 1933)
- 1855 – Ned Hanlan, Canadian rower, academic, and businessman (died 1908)
- 1857 – George E. Ohr, American potter (died 1918)
- 1861 – Anton Arensky, Russian pianist, composer, and educator (died 1906)
- 1863 – Albert Calmette, French physician, bacteriologist, and immunologist (died 1933)
- 1863 – Paul Drude, German physicist and academic (died 1906)
- 1868 – Stefan George, German poet and translator (died 1933)
- 1870 – Louis II, Prince of Monaco (died 1949)
- 1872 – Emil Hácha, Czech lawyer and politician, 3rd President of Czechoslovakia (died 1945)
- 1876 – Max Jacob, French poet, painter, and critic (died 1944)
- 1878 – Peeter Põld, Estonian scientist and politician, 1st Estonian Minister of Education (died 1930)
- 1879 – Margherita Piazzola Beloch, Italian mathematician (died 1976)
- 1879 – Han Yong-un, Korean poet (died 1944)
- 1880 – Tod Browning, American actor, director, and screenwriter (died 1962)
- 1881 – Natalia Goncharova, Russian theatrical costume and set designer, painter and illustrator (died 1962)
- 1884 – Bob Diry, Austrian-born wrestler and boxer (died 1935)
- 1884 – Louis B. Mayer, Russian-born American film producer, co-founded Metro-Goldwyn-Mayer (died 1957)
- 1884 – Amedeo Modigliani, Italian painter and sculptor (died 1920)
- 1886 – Jean Hersholt, Danish-American actor and director (died 1956)
- 1888 – Zygmunt Janiszewski, Polish mathematician and academic (died 1920)
- 1892 – Bruno Schulz, Ukrainian-Polish author and painter (died 1942)
- 1895 – Kirsten Flagstad, Norwegian soprano (died 1962)
- 1895 – Buckminster Fuller, American architect and engineer, designed the Montreal Biosphère (died 1983)
- 1895 – Oscar Hammerstein II, American director, producer, and songwriter (died 1960)
- 1900 – Marcel Paul, French communist politician and Holocaust survivor (died 1982)

=== 1901–present ===
- 1902 – Günther Anders, German philosopher and journalist (died 1992)
- 1902 – Vic Armbruster, Australian rugby league footballer (died 1984)
- 1904 – Pablo Neruda, Chilean poet and diplomat, Nobel Prize laureate (died 1973)
- 1905 – Prince John of the United Kingdom, Youngest son of George V and Mary of Teck (died 1919)
- 1907 – Weary Dunlop, Australian colonel and surgeon (died 1993)
- 1908 – Milton Berle, American comedian and actor (died 2002)
- 1908 – Alain Cuny, French actor (died 1994)
- 1908 – Paul Runyan, American golfer and sportscaster (died 2002)
- 1909 – Joe DeRita, American actor, 'Curly' of the Three Stooges (died 1993)
- 1909 – Motoichi Kumagai, Japanese photographer and illustrator (died 2010)
- 1909 – Fritz Leonhardt, German engineer, designed Fernsehturm Stuttgart (died 1999)
- 1909 – Herbert Zim, American naturalist, author, and educator (died 1994)
- 1911 – Evald Mikson, Estonian footballer (died 1993)
- 1913 – Willis Lamb, American physicist and academic, Nobel Prize laureate (died 2008)
- 1914 – Mohammad Moin, Iranian linguist and lexicographer (died 1971)
- 1916 – Lyudmila Pavlichenko, Ukrainian-Russian soldier and sniper (died 1974)
- 1917 – Luigi Gorrini, Italian soldier and pilot (died 2014)
- 1917 – Satyendra Narayan Sinha, Indian statesman (died 2006)
- 1917 – Andrew Wyeth, American artist (died 2009)
- 1920 – Pierre Berton, Canadian journalist and author (died 2004)
- 1920 – Bob Fillion, Canadian ice hockey player and manager (died 2015)
- 1920 – Paul Gonsalves, American saxophonist (died 1974)
- 1920 – Randolph Quirk, Manx linguist and academic (died 2017)
- 1920 – Beah Richards, American actress (died 2000)
- 1922 – Mark Hatfield, American soldier and politician, 29th Governor of Oregon (died 2011)
- 1923 – James E. Gunn, American science fiction author (died 2020)
- 1924 – Faidon Matthaiou, Greek basketball player and coach (died 2011)
- 1924 – Michel d'Ornano, French politician (died 1991)
- 1925 – Albert Lance, Australian-French tenor (died 2013)
- 1925 – Roger Smith, American businessman (died 2007)
- 1927 – Françoys Bernier, Canadian pianist, conductor, and educator (died 1993)
- 1927 – Conte Candoli, American trumpet player (died 2001)
- 1927 – Jack Harshman, American baseball player (died 2013)
- 1927 – Harley Hotchkiss, Canadian businessman (died 2011)
- 1928 – Alastair Burnet, English journalist (died 2012)
- 1928 – Elias James Corey, American chemist and academic, Nobel Prize laureate
- 1928 – Imero Fiorentino, American lighting designer (died 2013)
- 1930 – Gordon Pinsent, Canadian actor, director, and screenwriter (died 2023)
- 1930 – Guy Ligier, French race car driver and team owner (died 2015)
- 1931 – Eric Ives, English historian and academic (died 2012)
- 1931 – Geeto Mongol, Canadian-American wrestler and trainer (died 2013)
- 1931 – Giuseppe Malandrino, Italian Roman Catholic prelate (died 2025)
- 1932 – Monte Hellman, American director and producer (died 2021)
- 1932 – Otis Davis, American sprinter (died 2024)
- 1933 – Victor Poor, American engineer, developed the Datapoint 2200 (died 2012)
- 1933 – Donald E. Westlake, American author and screenwriter (died 2008)
- 1934 – Van Cliburn, American pianist and composer (died 2013)
- 1935 – Satoshi Ōmura, Japanese biochemist and academic, Nobel Prize laureate
- 1936 – Jan Němec, Czech director and screenwriter (died 2016)
- 1936 – Frank Ryan, American football player and mathematician (died 2024)
- 1937 – Bill Cosby, American actor, comedian, producer, and screenwriter
- 1937 – Mickey Edwards, American lawyer and politician
- 1937 – Lionel Jospin, French civil servant and politician, 165th Prime Minister of France (died 2026)
- 1937 – Robert McFarlane, American colonel and diplomat, 13th United States National Security Advisor (died 2022)
- 1937 – Guy Woolfenden, English composer and conductor (died 2016)
- 1938 – Ron Fairly, American baseball player and sportscaster (died 2019)
- 1938 – Wieger Mensonides, Dutch swimmer
- 1938 – Eiko Ishioka, Japanese art director and graphic designer (died 2012)
- 1938 – Ray Scott, American basketball player and coach
- 1939 – Phillip Adams, Australian journalist and producer
- 1939 – Bill Cooper, American football player
- 1941 – Benny Parsons, American race car driver and sportscaster (died 2007)
- 1942 – Swamp Dogg, American R&B singer-songwriter and musician
- 1942 – Roy Palmer, English cricketer and umpire
- 1942 – Billy Smith, Australian rugby league footballer and coach
- 1942 – Steve Young, American country singer-songwriter and guitarist (died 2016)
- 1943 – Christine McVie, English singer-songwriter and keyboard player (died 2022)
- 1943 – Paul Silas, American basketball player and coach (died 2022)
- 1944 – Simon Blackburn, English philosopher and academic
- 1944 – Delia Ephron, American author, playwright, and screenwriter
- 1945 – Butch Hancock, American country-folk singer-songwriter and musician
- 1946 – Sian Barbara Allen, American television actress (died 2025)
- 1947 – Gareth Edwards, Welsh rugby player and sportscaster
- 1947 – Carl Lundgren, American artist and illustrator
- 1947 – Richard C. McCarty, American psychologist and academic
- 1948 – Ben Burtt, American director, screenwriter, and sound designer
- 1948 – Walter Egan, American singer-songwriter and guitarist
- 1948 – Elias Khoury, Lebanese intellectual, playwright and novelist (died 2024)
- 1948 – Richard Simmons, American fitness trainer and actor (died 2024)
- 1950 – Eric Carr, American drummer and songwriter (died 1991)
- 1950 – Gilles Meloche, Canadian ice hockey player and coach
- 1951 – Brian Grazer, American screenwriter and producer, founded Imagine Entertainment
- 1951 – Cheryl Ladd, American actress
- 1951 – Piotr Pustelnik, Polish mountaineer
- 1951 – Jamey Sheridan, American actor
- 1952 – Voja Antonić, Serbian computer scientist and journalist, designed the Galaksija computer
- 1952 – Irina Bokova, Bulgarian politician, Bulgarian Minister of Foreign Affairs
- 1954 – Eric Adams, American singer-songwriter
- 1954 – Wolfgang Dremmler, German footballer and coach
- 1955 – Timothy Garton Ash, English historian and author
- 1956 – Mel Harris, American actress
- 1956 – Pate Mustajärvi, Finnish rock singer (died 2025)
- 1956 – Sandi Patty, American singer and pianist
- 1956 – Mario Soto, Dominican baseball player
- 1957 – Catherine Connolly, Irish politician, 10th President of Ireland
- 1957 – Rick Husband, American colonel, pilot, and astronaut (died 2003)
- 1957 – Dave Semenko, Canadian ice hockey player and sportscaster (died 2017)
- 1958 – Tonya Lee Williams, English-Canadian actress and producer
- 1959 – Tupou VI, King of Tonga
- 1959 – Karl J. Friston, English psychiatrist and neuroscientist
- 1959 – Charlie Murphy, American actor and comedian (died 2017)
- 1961 – Heikko Glöde, German footballer and manager
- 1961 – Shiva Rajkumar, Indian actor, singer, and producer
- 1962 – Julio César Chávez, Mexican boxer
- 1962 – Luc De Vos, Belgian singer-songwriter and guitarist (died 2014)
- 1962 – Dan Murphy, American musician
- 1962 – Joanna Shields, American-English businesswoman
- 1962 – Dean Wilkins, English footballer and manager
- 1964 – Gaby Roslin, English television host and actress
- 1965 – Sanjay Manjrekar, Indian cricketer and sportscaster
- 1965 – Robin Wilson, American singer and guitarist
- 1966 – Jeff Bucknum, American race car driver
- 1966 – Annabel Croft, English tennis player and sportscaster
- 1966 – Taiji, Japanese bass player and songwriter (died 2011)
- 1967 – John Petrucci, American singer-songwriter and guitarist
- 1967 – Bruny Surin, Canadian sprinter
- 1968 – Catherine Plewinski, French swimmer
- 1969 – Chantal Jouanno, French politician, French Minister of Youth Affairs and Sports
- 1969 – Anne-Sophie Pic, French chef
- 1969 – Jesse Pintado, Mexican-American guitarist (died 2006)
- 1970 – Aure Atika, Portuguese-French actress, director, and screenwriter
- 1970 – Lee Byung-hun, South Korean actor
- 1970 – Susan Tyler Witten, American politician
- 1971 – Andriy Kovalenco, Ukrainian-Spanish rugby player
- 1971 – Kristi Yamaguchi, American figure skater
- 1972 – Jake Wood, English actor
- 1973 – Christian Vieri, Italian footballer
- 1974 – Sharon den Adel, Dutch singer-songwriter
- 1974 – Stelios Giannakopoulos, Greek footballer and manager
- 1974 – Gregory Shane Helms, American professional wrestler
- 1975 – Ben Carroll, Australian politician, 50th Premier of Victoria
- 1975 – Phil Lord, American filmmaker and actor
- 1975 – Cheyenne Jackson, American actor and singer
- 1976 – Dan Boyle, Canadian ice hockey player
- 1976 – Anna Friel, English actress
- 1976 – Tracie Spencer, American singer-songwriter and actress
- 1977 – Neil Harris, English footballer and manager
- 1977 – Steve Howey, American actor
- 1977 – Brock Lesnar, American mixed martial artist and wrestler
- 1977 – Marco Silva, Portuguese football manager
- 1978 – Topher Grace, American actor
- 1978 – Michelle Rodriguez, American actress
- 1979 – Maya Kobayashi, Japanese journalist
- 1980 – Kristen Connolly, American actress
- 1981 – Adrienne Camp, South African singer-songwriter
- 1981 – Pradeepan Raveendran, Sri Lankan director, producer, and screenwriter
- 1982 – Antonio Cassano, Italian footballer
- 1982 – Jason Wright, American football player, businessman, and executive
- 1983 – Howie Kendrick, American baseball player
- 1983 – Kimberly Perry, American singer and songwriter
- 1984 – Gareth Gates, English singer-songwriter
- 1984 – Jonathan Lewis, American football player
- 1984 – Natalie Martinez, American actress
- 1984 – Michael McGovern, Northern Irish footballer
- 1984 – Sami Zayn, Canadian professional wrestler
- 1985 – Paulo Vitor Barreto, Brazilian footballer
- 1985 – Gianluca Curci, Italian footballer
- 1985 – Keven Lacombe, Canadian cyclist
- 1985 – Ismael Londt, Surinamese-Dutch kickboxer
- 1986 – Didier Digard, French footballer
- 1986 – Hannaliis Jaadla, Estonian footballer
- 1986 – JP Pietersen, South African rugby player
- 1986 – Simone Laudehr, German footballer
- 1987 – Lisbeth Torfing, Danish politician
- 1988 – Patrick Beverley, American basketball player
- 1988 – LeSean McCoy, American football player
- 1988 – Inbee Park, South Korean golfer
- 1989 – Nick Palmieri, American ice hockey player
- 1989 – Phoebe Tonkin, Australian actress
- 1989 – Hilary Knight, American ice hockey player
- 1990 – Bebé, Portuguese footballer
- 1990 – Rachel Brosnahan, American actress
- 1991 – Pablo Carreño Busta, Spanish tennis player
- 1991 – Salih Dursun, Turkish footballer
- 1991 – James Rodríguez, Colombian footballer
- 1991 – Erik Per Sullivan, American actor
- 1992 – Bartosz Bereszyński, Polish footballer
- 1992 – Luke Berry, English footballer
- 1993 – Jonas Brodin, Swedish ice hockey player
- 1994 – Kanako Momota, Japanese singer-songwriter
- 1995 – Evania Pelite, Australian rugby union player
- 1995 – Luke Shaw, English footballer
- 1995 – Moses Simon, Nigerian footballer
- 1995 – Jordyn Wieber, American gymnast
- 1996 – Moussa Dembélé, French footballer
- 1996 – Jordan Romero, American mountaineer
- 1997 – Claire Chicha, French Korean singer-songwriter known by the stage name Spill Tab
- 1997 – Jean-Kévin Duverne, French footballer
- 1997 – Malala Yousafzai, Pakistani-English activist, Nobel Prize laureate
- 1998 – Shai Gilgeous-Alexander, Canadian basketball player
- 2000 – Vinícius Júnior, Brazilian footballer
- 2000 – Veronica Burton, American basketball player
- 2001 – Kaylee McKeown, Australian swimmer
- 2002 – Nico Williams, Spanish footballer
- 2004 – Diabé Bolumbu, French footballer

== Deaths ==
=== Pre-1600 ===
- 524 – Viventiolus, archbishop of Lyon (born 460)
- 783 – Bertrada of Laon, Frankish queen (born 720)
- 965 – Meng Chang, emperor of Later Shu (born 919)
- 981 – Xue Juzheng, Chinese scholar-official and historian
- 1067 – John Komnenos, Byzantine general
- 1441 – Ashikaga Yoshinori, Japanese shōgun (born 1394)
- 1441 – Kyōgoku Takakazu, Japanese nobleman
- 1489 – Bahlul Lodi, sultan of Delhi
- 1536 – Desiderius Erasmus, Dutch priest and philosopher (born 1466)
- 1584 – Steven Borough, English navigator and explorer (born 1525)

=== 1601–1900 ===
- 1623 – William Bourchier, 3rd Earl of Bath (born 1557)
- 1664 – Stefano della Bella, Italian illustrator and engraver (born 1610)
- 1682 – Jean Picard, French priest and astronomer (born 1620)
- 1691 – Marquis de St Ruth, French general
- 1693 – John Ashby, English admiral (born 1640)
- 1712 – Richard Cromwell, English academic and politician (born 1626)
- 1742 – Evaristo Felice Dall'Abaco, Italian violinist and composer (born 1675)
- 1749 – Charles de la Boische, Marquis de Beauharnois, French navy officer and politician, Governor General of New France (born 1671)
- 1773 – Johann Joachim Quantz, German flute player and composer (born 1697)
- 1804 – Alexander Hamilton, American general, economist, and politician, 1st United States Secretary of the Treasury (born 1755)
- 1845 – Henrik Wergeland, Norwegian linguist, poet, and playwright (born 1808)
- 1850 – Robert Stevenson, Scottish engineer (born 1772)
- 1855 – Pavel Nakhimov, Russian admiral (born 1802)
- 1870 – John A. Dahlgren, American admiral (born 1809)
- 1892 – Alexander Cartwright, American firefighter, invented baseball (born 1820)

=== 1901–present ===
- 1908 – William D. Coleman, 13th President of Liberia (born 1842)
- 1908 - Robert Potter, minister and writer (born 1831)
- 1910 – Charles Rolls, English engineer and businessman, co-founded Rolls-Royce Limited (born 1877)
- 1926 – Gertrude Bell, English archaeologist and spy (born 1868)
- 1926 – Charles Wood Irish composer (born 1866)
- 1929 – Robert Henri, American painter and educator (born 1865)
- 1931 – Nathan Söderblom, Swedish archbishop, Nobel Prize laureate (born 1866)
- 1934 – Ole Evinrude, Norwegian-American inventor and businessman, invented the outboard motor (born 1877)
- 1935 – Alfred Dreyfus, French colonel (born 1859)
- 1944 – Theodore Roosevelt Jr., American general and politician, Governor of Puerto Rico (born 1887)
- 1945 – Boris Galerkin, Russian mathematician and engineer (born 1871)
- 1945 – Wolfram Freiherr von Richthofen, German field marshal (born 1895)
- 1946 – Ray Stannard Baker, American journalist and author (born 1870)
- 1947 – Jimmie Lunceford, American saxophonist and bandleader (born 1902)
- 1949 – Douglas Hyde, Irish scholar and politician, 1st President of Ireland (born 1860)
- 1950 – Elsie de Wolfe, American actress, author, and interior decorator (born 1865)
- 1956 – John Hayes, Australian politician, 25th Premier of Tasmania (born 1868)
- 1961 – Mazo de la Roche, Canadian author and playwright (born 1879)
- 1962 – Roger Wolfe Kahn, American composer and bandleader (born 1907)
- 1965 – Christfried Burmeister, Estonian speed skater (born 1898)
- 1966 – D. T. Suzuki, Japanese philosopher and author (born 1870)
- 1969 – Henry George Lamond, Australian farmer and author (born 1885)
- 1971 – Yvon Robert, Canadian wrestler (born 1914)
- 1973 – Lon Chaney Jr., American actor (born 1906)
- 1975 – James Ormsbee Chapin, American painter and illustrator (born 1887)
- 1979 – Olive Morris, Jamaican-English civil rights activist (born 1952)
- 1979 – Minnie Riperton, American singer-songwriter (born 1947)
- 1980 – John Warren Davis, American educator, college administrator, and civil rights leader (born 1888)
- 1982 – Kenneth More, English actor (born 1914)
- 1983 – Chris Wood, English saxophonist (born 1944)
- 1990 – João Saldanha, Brazilian footballer, manager, and journalist (born 1917)
- 1992 – Caroline Pafford Miller, American journalist and author (born 1903)
- 1993 – Dan Eldon, English photographer and journalist (born 1970)
- 1994 – Eila Campbell, English geographer and cartographer (born 1915)
- 1996 – John Chancellor, American journalist (born 1927)
- 1997 – François Furet, French historian and author (born 1927)
- 1998 – Jimmy Driftwood, American singer-songwriter and banjo player (born 1907)
- 1998 – Arkady Ostashev, Soviet/Russian scientist and engineer (born 1925)
- 1998 – Serge Lemoyne, Canadian painter (born 1941)
- 1999 – Rajendra Kumar, Indian actor (born 1921)
- 2000 – Charles Merritt, Canadian colonel and politician, Victoria Cross recipient (born 1908)
- 2001 – Fred Marcellino, American author and illustrator (born 1939)
- 2003 – Benny Carter, American trumpet player, saxophonist, and composer (born 1907)
- 2003 – Mark Lovell, English race car driver (born 1960)
- 2004 – Betty Oliphant, English-Canadian ballerina, co-founded the National Ballet School of Canada (born 1918)
- 2005 – John King, Baron King of Wartnaby, English businessman (born 1917)
- 2007 – Robert Burås, Norwegian singer-songwriter and guitarist (born 1975)
- 2007 – Stan Zemanek, Australian radio and television host (born 1947)
- 2008 – Bobby Murcer, American baseball player, coach, and sportscaster (born 1946)
- 2008 – Tony Snow, American journalist, 26th White House Press Secretary (born 1955)
- 2010 – Olga Guillot, Cuban-American singer (born 1922)
- 2010 – James P. Hogan, English-American author (born 1941)
- 2010 – Paulo Moura, Brazilian clarinetist and saxophonist (born 1932)
- 2010 – Pius Njawé, Cameroonian journalist (born 1957)
- 2010 – Harvey Pekar, American author and critic (born 1939)
- 2011 – Sherwood Schwartz, American screenwriter and producer (born 1916)
- 2012 – Alimuddin, Pakistani cricketer (born 1930)
- 2012 – Dara Singh, Indian wrestler, actor, and politician (born 1928)
- 2012 – Eddy Brown, English footballer and manager (born 1926)
- 2012 – Else Holmelund Minarik, Danish-American author and illustrator (born 1920)
- 2012 – Roger Payne, English mountaineer (born 1956)
- 2012 – Hamid Samandarian, Iranian director and playwright (born 1931)
- 2012 – George C. Stoney, American director and producer (born 1916)
- 2013 – Amar Bose, American businessman, founded the Bose Corporation (born 1929)
- 2013 – Takako Takahashi, Japanese author (born 1932)
- 2013 – Elaine Morgan, Welsh writer (born 1920)
- 2013 – Alan Whicker, Egyptian-English journalist (born 1921)
- 2014 – Jamil Ahmad, Pakistani author (born 1931)
- 2014 – Nestor Basterretxea, Spanish painter and sculptor (born 1924)
- 2014 – Emil Bobu, Romanian politician (born 1927)
- 2014 – Alfred de Grazia, American political scientist and author (born 1919)
- 2014 – Kenneth J. Gray, American soldier and politician (born 1924)
- 2014 – Valeriya Novodvorskaya, Russian journalist and politician (born 1950)
- 2015 – D'Army Bailey, American lawyer, judge, and actor (born 1941)
- 2015 – Chenjerai Hove, Zimbabwean journalist, author, and poet (born 1956)
- 2015 – Tenzin Delek Rinpoche, Tibetan monk and activist (born 1950)
- 2015 – Cheng Siwei, Chinese engineer, economist, and politician (born 1935)
- 2016 – Goran Hadžić, Serbian politician (born 1958)
- 2018 – Annabelle Neilson, English socialite (born 1969)
- 2019 – Emily Hartridge, English YouTuber and television presenter (born 1984)
- 2020 – Kelly Preston, American actress and model (born 1962)
- 2020 – Wim Suurbier, Dutch football player (born 1945)
- 2024 – Tonke Dragt, Dutch children's writer and illustrator (born 1930)
- 2024 – Bill Viola, American video and installation artist (born 1951)
- 2024 – Ruth Westheimer, German-American sex therapist (born 1928)
- 2024 – Evan Wright, American writer (born 1964)
- 2024 – Noriko Ohara, Japanese voice actress and narrator (born 1935)
- 2026 – Hamad bin Khalifa Al Thani, Emir of Qatar (born 1952)
- 2026 – John Hamm, Canadian politician, 25th Premier of Nova Scotia (born 1938).

== Holidays and observances ==
- Christian feast day:
  - Feast of Saints Peter and Paul (Eastern Orthodox)
  - Hermagoras and Fortunatus
  - Jason of Thessalonica (Catholic Church)
  - John Gualbert
  - John Jones
  - Drostan
  - Louis Martin and Marie-Azélie Guérin
  - Nabor and Felix
  - Nathan Söderblom (Lutheran, Episcopal Church (USA))
  - Veronica
  - Viventiolus
  - July 12 (Eastern Orthodox liturgics)
- The second day of Naadam (Mongolia)
- The Twelfth, also known as Orangemen's Day (Northern Ireland, Scotland, Newfoundland and Labrador)
