= Takakazu =

- Gender: Male

Origin
- Origin: Japanese
- Meaning: Different meanings depending on the kanji used

Takakazu (written: 隆一, 鷹一, 高数 or 孝和) is a masculine Japanese given name. Notable people with the name include:

- Takakazu Ishii (石井 隆一; born 1945), Japanese politician
- Takakazu Kinashi (木梨 鷹一; 1902–1944), Japanese submarine commander
- Kyōgoku Takakazu (d. 1441) (京極 高数), Japanese noble
- Seki Takakazu (関 孝和; 1642–1708), Japanese mathematician and writer

== Fictional characters ==
- Takakazu Abe (阿部 高和), a character in the manga series Kuso Miso Technique
