= Chōroku =

Period of Japanese history (1457–1460)

Chōroku (長禄) was a Japanese era name (年号, nengō; lit. "year name") after Kōshō and before Kanshō. This period spanned the years from September 1457 through December 1460. The reigning emperor was Go-Hanazono-tennō (後花園天皇).

== Change of era ==
- 1457 Chōroku gannen (長禄元年): The era name was changed to mark an event or a number of events. The old era ended and a new one commenced in Kōshō 3.

== Events of the Chōroku era ==
- 1457 (Chōroku 1'): Tarō Sayemon attempted to retrieve the Sacred Jewel for Emperor Go-Hanazono; and he actually did manage to gain possession of it for a brief time. A counterattack prevented the success of this dangerous mission in Yoshino. In 1443 (Kakitsu 3, 23rd day of the 9th month), an armed group of rebels penetrated the palace defenses. A fire was started and one of the men sought to kill Emperor Go-Hanazono, but the emperor escaped. However, the intruders managed to steal the Sacred Treasures – the mirror, the sword and the jewel. Later, a guard found the mirror and a priest found the sword, but the location of the jewel was not known until the 8th month of Bunnan gannen.
- 1458 (Chōroku 2, 8th month): The Sacred Jewel is retrieved from the former Southern Court. It is returned to Kyoto to join the other Sacred Treasures which comprise the Imperial Regalia of Japan.
- 1459 (Chōroku 3): Shōgun Ashikaga Yoshimasa provided a new mikoshi and a complete set of robes and other accouterments for this festival on the occasion of repairs to the Atsuta Shrine in the 1457-1459 (Chōroku 1-3).

== Notes ==
Preceded by Kōshō	Era or nengō Chōroku; 1457–1460	Succeeded by Kanshō
