= Nijō Mitsumoto =

Japanese noble (1383-1410)

- Kugyō
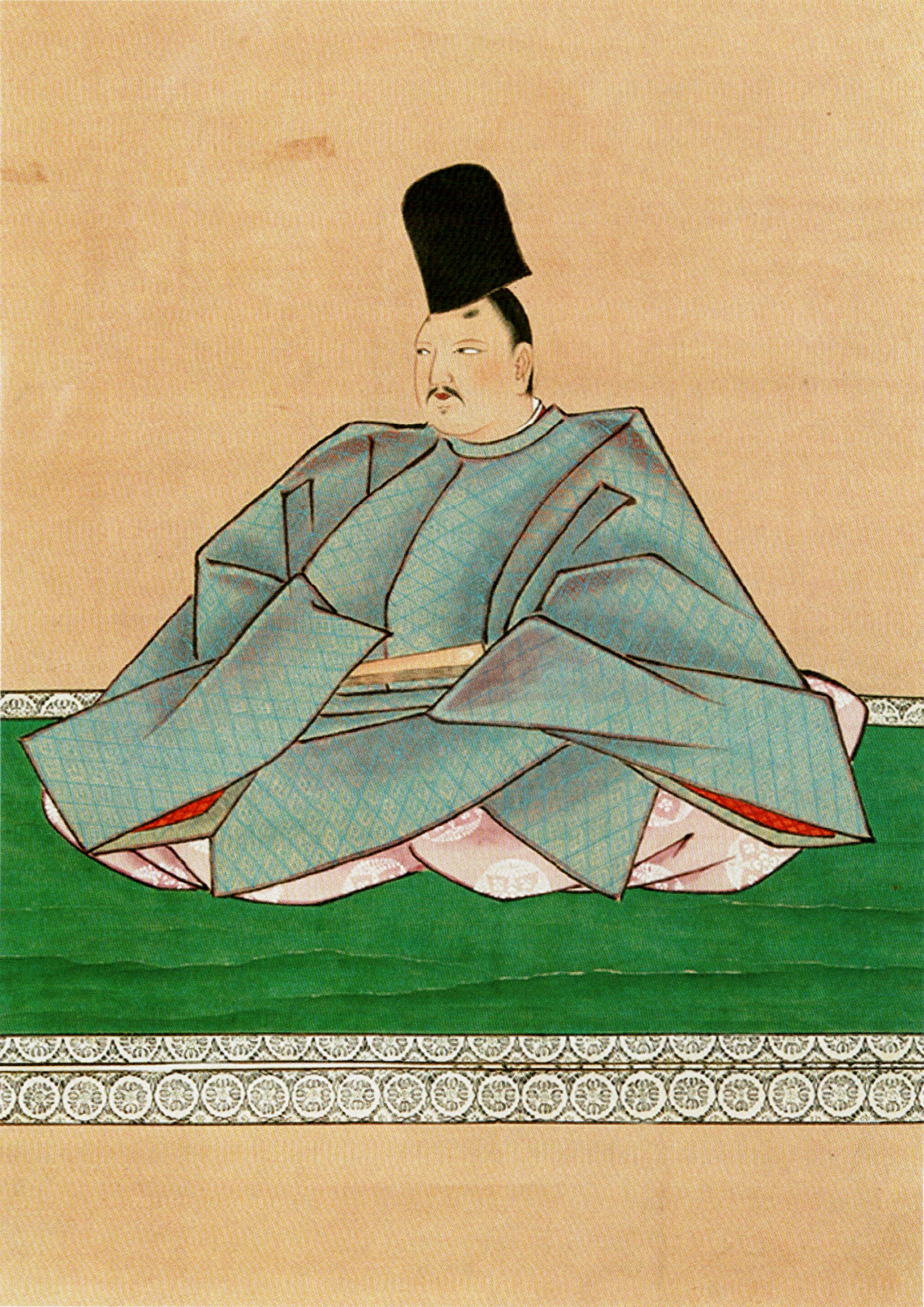
- Native name: 二条 満基
- Born: 1383
- Died: 1410 (aged 26–27)
- Father: Nijō Morotsugu
- Occupation: Kampaku

Nijō Mitsumoto (二条 満基; 1383 – 1410), son of regent Nijō Morotsugu, was a Japanese kugyō (court noble) of the Muromachi period (1336–1573). He held a regent position kampaku from 1409 to 1410. He adopted his brother Nijō Motonori as his son.
