= Ōei =

Period of Japanese history (1394–1428)

Ōei (応永) was a Japanese era name (年号, nengō; "year name") after Meitoku and before Shōchō. This period spanned the years from July 1394 through April 1428. Reigning emperors were Go-Komatsu-tennō (後小松天皇,) and Shōkō-tennō (称光天皇).

== Change of era ==
- 1394 Ōei gannen (応永元年): The new era name was created because of plague. The previous era ended and a new one commenced in Meitoku 5, the 5th day of the 7th month.

== Events of the Ōei era ==
- 1394 (Ōei 1): Yoshimitsu officially cedes his position to his son;
- 1396 (Ōei 3): Imagawa Sadayo dismissed.
- 1397 (Ōei 4): Uprising in Kyūshū suppressed.
- May 13, 1397 (Ōei 4, 16th day of the 4th month): Construction begun on Kinkaku-ji.
- 1397 (Ōei 4, 8th month): an Imperial ambassador is dispatched from Emperor Go-Komatsu to the court of the Hongwu Emperor of China.
- September 1398 (Ōei 5, 8th month): In the early autumn in the 6th year of the reign of King Taejong of Joseon, a diplomatic mission was sent to Japan. Pak Ton-ji and his retinue arrived in Kyoto. Shōgun Yoshimochi presented the envoy with a formal diplomatic letter; and presents were given for the envoy to convey to the Joseon court.
- 1398 (Ōei 5) Muromachi administration organized.
- November 18, 1399 (Ōei 6, 28th day of the 10th month): Ōei Rebellion (応永の乱, Ōei no ran) begins. Ōuchi Yoshihiro raises an army against shōgun Ashikaga Yoshimitsu; and the Ashikaga forces prevail against this opposition.
- 1399 (Ōei 6): Ōuchi Yoshihiro and Ashikaga Mitsukane rebel—Ōei War.
- 1401 (Ōei 8, 2nd month): The Imperial Palace was burned.
- 1401 (Ōei 8): Yoshimitsu sends a diplomatic mission to the court of the Jianwen Emperor of China as a tentative first step in re-initiating trade between Japan and Ming China. The letter conveyed to the Emperor of China was accompanied by a gift of 1000 ounces of gold and diverse objects.
- 1402 (Ōei 9): A letter from the Jianwen Emperor of China was received by Yoshimitsu; and this formal communication mistakenly accords the title "king of Japan" to the Japanese shōgun.
- 1402 (Ōei 9): Uprising in Mutsu suppressed.
- 1404 (Ōei 11): Yoshimitsu appointed Nippon Koku-Ō (King of Japan) by Chinese emperor.
- 1408 (Ōei 15): Yoshimitsu dies.
- 1408 (Ōei 15): Yoshimochi comes into his own as a shōgun.
- 1409 (Ōei 16, 3rd month): An ambassador from the Joseon court was received in Kyoto.
- 1409 (Ōei 16): Ashikaga Mochiuji becomes Kantō kubō.
- 1411 (Ōei 18): Yoshimochi breaks off relations with China.
- 1412 (Ōei 19): Emperor Shōkō was made the new sovereign upon the abdication of his father, Emperor Go-Komatsu. His actual coronation date was two years later. Shōkō was only 12 years old when he began living in the daïri; but Go-Komatsu, as a Cloistered Emperor still retained direction of the court and the shōgun was charged with the general superintendence of affairs until his death at age 57 in 1433.
- 1413 (Ōei 20): Shōgun Ashikaga Yoshimochi fell ill, and so he sent an ambassador to the Ise Shrine to pray for the return of his health.
- 1413 (Ōei 20): Emperor Go-Komatsu abdicates; Emperor Shōkō ascends throne in repudiation of agreement; renewed hostility between shogunate and supporters of Southern Court.
- January 29, 1415 (Ōei 21, on the 19th day of the 12th month): Enthronement of Emperor Shōkō.
- 1415 (Ōei 22): Dissension between Mochiuji, the Kantō Kubō at Kamakura, and Uesugi Zenshū (Kanrei).
- 1416 (Ōei 23): Uesugi rebels.
- 1417 (Ōei 24): Uesugi's rebellion quelled by Mochiuji.
- 1418 (Ōei 25): Rebuilding of Asama Shrine at the base of Mount Fuji in Suruga Province is ordered by Ashikaga Yoshimochi.
- July 18, 1419 (Ōei 26, 26th day of the 6th month): Ōei Invasion (応永の外寇, Ōei no gaikō) was a Joseon military action in Tsushima Province (Tsushima Island). The Joseon military forces were focused on the pirates (wakō) which had established bases from which to raid the coastline of the Korean peninsula. More than 200 ships and 17,000 fighting men took part in this military expedition.
- 1420 (Ōei 27): Serious famine with great loss of life.
- 1422 (Ōei 29): Resuragence of southern supporters.
- 1423 (Ōei 30, 2nd month): Shōgun Yoshimochi retires in favor of his son, Ashikaga Yoshikatsu, who is 17 years old.
- 1424 (Ōei 31): Go-Kameyama dies.
- March 17, 1425 (Ōei 32, 27th day of the 2nd month): Shōgun Yoshikatsu died at the age of 19 years, having administered the empire for only three years.
- 1425 (Ōei 32): After Yoshikazu dies, Yoshimochi resumes the responsibilities of office.
- 1428 (Ōei 35): Yoshimochi dies; Shōkō dies; Go-Hanazono ascends throne in second repudiation of agreement.

== Notes ==
Preceded by Meitoku	Era or nengō Ōei; 1394–1428	Succeeded by Shōchō
