= Konoe Fusatsugu =

Konoe Fusatsugu (近衛 房嗣; 1402–1488), the first son of Tadatsugu, was a kugyō or Japanese court noble of the Muromachi period (1336–1573). He held a regent position kampaku from 1445 to 1447. With a commoner he had sons Konoe Norimoto (近衛 教基; 1423-1462) and Masaie.

His posthumous name is Go-Chisoku-In (後知足院).

== Career ==
- Ōei 33, on the 24th day of the 7th month (1426): Naidaijin (内大臣)
- Eikyō 1, on the 4th day of the 8th month (1429): Udaijin (右大臣)
- Eikyō 10, on the 4th day of the 9th month (1438): Sadaijin (左大臣)
- Bun'an 2, on the 23rd day of the 11th month (1445): Kampaku (関白) and Ujichōja (氏長者)(Head of Fujiwara clan)
- Bun'an 4, on the 15th day of the 6th month (1447): retire from Kampaku
- Kanshō 2, on the 25th day of the 21st month (1461): Daijō Daijin (太政大臣) and Ju-Ichii (従一位)
- Kanshō 4 (1463): retire from Daijō Daijin
- Bunmei 6 (1474): He became a priest (Buddhist name - Daitsū, 大通).
- Chōkyō 2, on the 19th day of the 10th month (1488): He died at the age of 86.
