= Kyōgoku Takakazu =

Kyōgoku Takakazu may refer to:

- Kyōgoku Takakazu (d. 1441) – Shugo of Yamashiro Province who died defending Ashikaga Yoshinori during the Kakitsu rebellion
- Kyōgoku Takakazu (d. 1662) – Head of the Kyōgoku clan and daimyō under the Tokugawa shogunate
- Kyōgoku Takakazu – Later head of the Kyōgoku clan and daimyō

== See also ==
- Kyōgoku clan
