= Hōtoku =

Period of Japanese history (1449–1452)

Hōtoku (宝徳) was a Japanese era name (年号, nengō; lit. "year name") after Bun'an and before Kyōtoku. This period spanned the years from July 1449 through July 1452. The reigning emperor was Go-Hanazono-tennō (後花園天皇).

== Change of era ==
- 1449 Hōtoku gannen (宝徳元年): The era name was changed to mark an event or a number of events. The previous era ended and a new one commenced in 1449 (Bun'an 6.)

The first year of Hotoku began on the 28th day of the 7th month. On the 10th day, the era name would still have been Bun'an 6.

== Events of the Hōtoku era ==
- May 8, 1449 (Hōtoku 1, 16th day of the 4th month): Shōgun Yoshinari is honored by the emperor with the gift of a sword.
- 1451 (Hōtoku 3, 7th month ): A delegation from the Ryukyu Islands arrives for the first time in Heian-kyō (Kyoto). Mention of this diplomatic event is among the first of its type to be published in the West in an 1832 French version of Sangoku Tsūran Zusetsu (三国通覧図説, An Illustrated Description of Three Countries) by Hayashi Shihei.
- 1451 (Hōtoku 3, 8th month ): Sogun Yoshihori causes a letter to be sent to the Emperor of China.

Appreciation for the waka poetry of Shōtetsu and Shinkei was noteworthy during this era.

== Notes ==
Preceded by Bun'an	Era or nengō Hōtoku; 1449–1452	Succeeded by Kyōtoku
