= Shōchō =

Period of Japanese history (1428–1429)

Shōchō (正長) was a Japanese era name (年号, nengō, "year name") after Ōei and before Eikyō, from April 1428 until September 1429. The reigning emperors were Shōkō-tennō (称光天皇) and Go-Hanazono-tennō (後花園天皇).

== Change of era ==
- 1428 Shōchō gannen (正長元年): The era name was changed to mark an event or a number of events. The previous era ended and a new one commenced in Ōei 35.

== Events of the Shōchō era ==
- February 3, 1428 (Shōchō 1, 18th day of the 1st month): Shōgun Ashikaga Yoshimochi, having taken power again after the death of his son, dies himself at the age of 43.
- August, 1428 (Shōchō 1, 7th month): Shocho Uprising begins.
- August 30, 1428 (Shōchō 1, 20th day of the 7th month): Emperor Shōkō died at the age of 27. Nihon Ōdai Ichiran suggests a cause of death by explaining: "Ce prince, s'occupait de magie et du culte de démons, mena une vie pure, et observa rigoureusement l'abstinence et le jeûne." [This prince, who occupied himself with magic and the cult of demons, led a pure life, and rigorously observed abstinence and fasting.]
- September 7, 1428 (Shōchō 1, 29th day of the 7th month): Emperor Go-Hanazono accedes to the throne at age 10.

== Notes ==
Preceded by Ōei	Era or nengō Shōchō; 1428–1429	Succeeded by Eikyō
