= Konoe Masaie =

Konoe Masaie (近衛 政家; 1445 – 1505) was a Japanese kugyō (court noble) of the Muromachi period (1336–1573). He held the regent position of kampaku from 1479 to 1483. He was the son of Konoe Fusatsugu, and the father of Konoe Hisamichi.
