= Kyōtoku =

Period of Japanese history (1452–1455)

Kyōtoku (享徳) was a Japanese era name (後花園天皇) after Hōtoku and before Kōshō. This period spanned the years from July 1452 through July 1455. The reigning emperor was Go-Hanazono-Tennō (後花園天皇).

== Change of era ==
- 1452 Kyōtoku gannen (享徳元年): The era name was changed to mark an event or a number of events. The old era ended and a new one commenced in Hōtoku 4.

== Events of the Kyōtoku era ==
- 1453 (Kyōtoku 2, 6th month): The name of the Shōgun, "Yoshinari", was changed to Ashikaga Yoshimasa, which is the name by which he is more commonly known in the modern era.
- 1454 (Kyōtoku 3): Ashikaga Shigeuji orchestrated for the killing of Uesugi Noritada, thus beginning a series of conflicts for control of the Kantō; and this event would come to be known as the Kyōtoku no Ran.

== Notes ==
Preceded by Hōtoku	Era or nengō Kyōtoku; 1452–1455	Succeeded by Kōshō
