= Hino Muneko =

Hino Muneko (日野宗子, Hino Muneko) or Mitsuko; year of birth unknown – June 12, 1447) was the wife of Ashikaga Yoshinori, the sixth shogun of the Muromachi shogunate. She was later separated from him and became a nun, taking the name Kanchiin.

== Family and context ==
Hino Muneko was born to Dainagon Hino Shigemitsu. After the death of the fourth shogun, Ashikaga Yoshimochi, his younger brother, Yoshien, returned to secular life and succeeded him as shogun, taking the name "Yoshinori." However, as a monk, Yoshinori was unmarried and needed to find an official wife immediately. Yoshimochi's wife, Hino Eiko, arranged with his nephew, Hino Yoshisuke (Shigemitsu's eldest son), to marry Yoshisuke's sister and Eiko's niece, Muneko.

== Imperial life ==
Less than a month after Ashikaga Yoshinori's return to secular life, on March 6, 1428, she was officially appointed Midokoro (Mitsui's wife), and the wedding took place on June 21, 1428. Muneko gave birth to a daughter on March 12, 1429, and on January 28 of the following year, she was conferred Third Rank. However, as the marriage itself was arranged by Yoshinori's guardian, Hino Eiko, the couple did not have a good relationship. Yoshinori gradually began to fall for his concubine, Masayoshi Sanjo Yoshiko.

Then, on June 5, 1431, Yoshinori suddenly declared that he would grant Yoshiko the status of empress dowager. From then on, Muneko was called the "Main Empress Dowager" and Yoshiko the "New Empress Dowager," meaning that Yoshinori now had two lawful wives. Furthermore, on July 26, their only child and daughter died, and the following day, on the 27, Hino Eiko also died from illness. Taking these as an opportunity, Yoshinori decided to separate from Muneko, and within the same year, Muneko was told of the separation and left the Imperial Palace. In compensation for the Hino family, Yoshinori took Muneko's younger sister, Hino Shigeko (later the biological mother of Yoshikatsu and Yoshimasa), as a concubine. However, although she was allowed to continue living in the north of Muromachi Palace after that, Yoshinori and his successor Yoshikatsu (Shigeko's son) died one after the other, and his younger brother Yoshimasa, who succeeded him, was too young to be raised in the residence of Karasuma Sukenari (Muneko and Shigeko's cousin). As a result, the facilities of Muromachi Palace were gradually moved to the Karasuma residence, and Muneko was left behind in Muromachi Palace masterless.

== Death ==
Her subsequent actions are unknown, but the entry for April 29, 1448, in the Yasutomi-ki records state that Muneko, who had become a nun and taken the name Kanchiin, died on that day.
