= Kōshō =

Period of Japanese history (1455–1457)

Kōshō (康正) was a Japanese era name (年号, nengō, lit. "year name") after Kyōtoku and before Chōroku. This period spanned the years from July 1455 through September 1457. The reigning emperor was Go-Hanazono-tennō (後花園天皇).

== Change of Era ==
- 1455 Kōshō gannen (康正元年): The era name was changed to mark an event or a number of events.

== Events of the Kōshō era ==
- 1456 (Kōshō 2, 3rd month): Ashikaga Yoshimasa visited Iwashimizu Shrine; and all the officials of the Daijō-kan joined him in going there.
- 1456 (Kōshō 2, 8th month): The father of Emperor Go-Hanazono, Fushimi-no-miya-shinnō Sadafusa, died at age 85.

== Notes ==
Preceded by Kyōtoku	Era or nengō Kōshō; 1455–1457	Succeeded by Chōroku
