= Nijō Morotsugu =

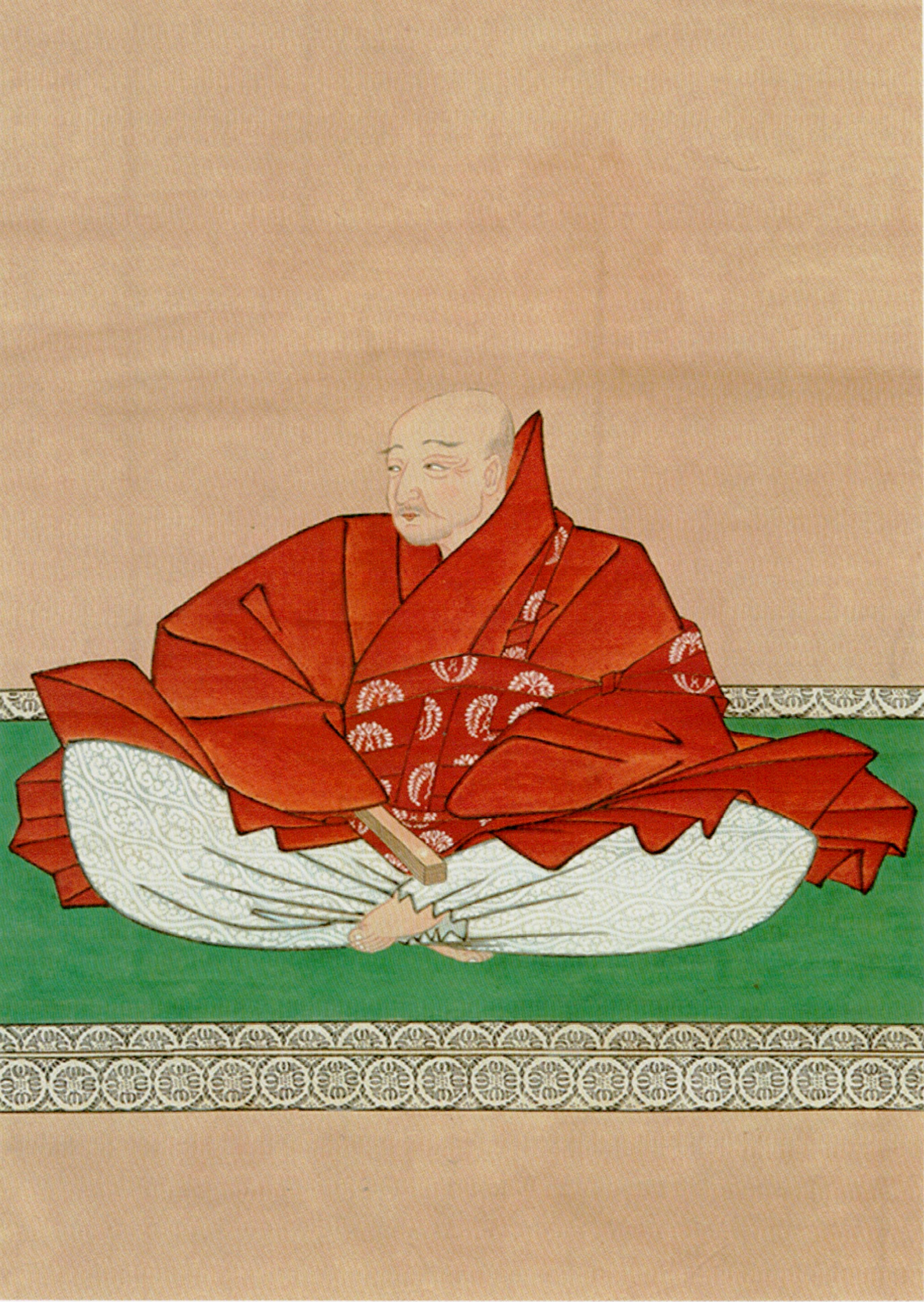

Nijō Morotsugu (二条 師嗣; 1356–1400), son of regent Nijō Yoshimoto, was a Japanese kugyō (court noble) of the Muromachi period (1336–1573). He held a regent position kampaku three times from 1379 to 1382, from 1388 to 1394, and from 1398 to 1399. He was the father of Nijō Mitsumoto and Nijō Motonori.
