= Eikyō =

Period of Japanese history (1429–1441)

Eikyō (永享) was a Japanese era name (年号, nengō; "year" name) after Shōchō and before Kakitsu. This period spanned the years from September 1429 through February 1441. The reigning emperor was Go-Hanazono-tennō (後花園天皇).

== Change of era ==
- 1429 Eikyō gannen (永享元年): The era name was changed to mark the beginning of the reign of Emperor Go-Hanazono. The previous era ended and a new era commenced in Shōchō 1, on the 29th day of the 7th month, when the new emperor was proclaimed.

== Events of the Eikyō era ==
- April 14, 1429 (Eikyō 1, 9th day of the 3rd month): Ashikaga Yoshinobu is honored in court; and thereafter, he is known as Yoshinori.
- 1429: Yoshinori appointed shōgun.
- 1430: Southern army surrenders.
- 1432: Akamatsu Mitsusuke flees; Yoshinori receives rescript from China.
- 1433 (Eikyō 5, 6th month): The Emperor of China addressed a letter to shōgun Yoshinori in which, as a conventional aspect of the foreign relations of Imperial China, the Chinese assume that the head of the Ashikaga shogunate is effectively the "king of Japan".
- 1433: Ōtomo rebels; Hieizan monks rebel.
- 1434: Tosenbugyo established to regulate foreign affairs.
- 1436: Yasaka Pagoda at Hokanji in Kyoto destroyed by fire.
- 1438: Kantō Kanrei (Kantō administrator) Ashikaga Mochiuji rebels against Muromachi shogunate, also known as Eikyō Rebellion (永享の乱, Eikyō-no-ran) .
- 1439: Mochiuji is defeated, and he commits suicide; dissatisfaction with Yoshinori grows.
- 1440: Yasaka Pagoda at Hokanji in Kyoto re-constructed by Yoshinori.
- 1441: Yoshinori grants Shimazu suzerainty over Ryukyu Islands; Akamatsu murders Yoshinori—Kakitsu Incident; Yamana kills Akamatsu.

== Notes ==
Preceded by Shōchō	Era or nengō Eikyō; 1429–1441	Succeeded by Kakitsu
