= Kakitsu =

Period of Japanese history (1441–1444)

Kakitsu (嘉吉) was a Japanese era name (年号, nengō, "year name") after Eikyō and before Bun'an. This period spanned the years from February 1441 through February 1444. The reigning emperor was Go-Hanazono-tennō (後花園天皇).

== Change of era ==
- 1451 Kakitsu gannen (嘉吉元年,): The era name was changed to mark an event or a number of events. The previous era ended and a new one commenced in Eikyō 13.

== Events of the Kakitsu era ==
- July 12, 1441 (Kakitsu 1, 24th day of the 6th month): Shōgun Ashikaga Yoshinori is murdered at age 48 by Akamatsu Mitsusuke who was upset that Akamatsu Sadaura was made leader of the Akamatsu clan. Shortly thereafter, Yoshinori's 8-year-old son, Ashikaga Yoshikatsu, was proclaimed as the new shōgun.
- July 12–28, 1441: A number of prominent nobles were also killed defending Shōgun Yoshinori directly through the fighting including Kyōgoku Takakazu, the Shugo of Yamashiro Province and Ōuchi Mochiyo (1394–1441), the head of the Ōuchi clan.
- 1441 (Kakitsu 1, 9th month): The murderers of Yoshinori kill themselves.
- 1443 (Kakitsu 3): A Japanese-Korean diplomatic agreement (sometimes called the "Kakitsu treaty") regularized an initial plan for mitigating the damage caused by pirates (wakō). The bilateral agreement assigned the responsibility for monitoring ships from Japan en route to Korea. The Sō clan of Tsushima han (Tsushima Island) were given the right to license ships sailing west beyond Tsushima; and this also encompassed the opportunity to profit from whatever fees the Sō might charge.
- August 16, 1443 (Kakitsu 3, 21st day of the 7th month): Shōgun Yoshikatsu died at the age of 10. He liked riding horses very much; but he was gravely injured in a fall from a horse. This was the cause of his death. He had been shōgun for only three years. His 8-year-old brother, Ashikaga Yoshinari, was then named shōgun.
- October 16, 1443 (Kakitsu 3, 23rd day of the 9th month): An armed group of rebels penetrated the palace defenses. A fire was started and one of the men sought to kill Go-Hanazono, but the emperor escaped. However, the intruders managed to steal the Three Sacred Treasures – the mirror, the sword and the jewel. Later, a guard found the mirror and a priest found the sword, but the location of jewel was not known until the 8th month of Bunnan gannen.

== Notes ==
Preceded by Eikyō	Era or nengō Kakitsu; 1441–1444	Succeeded by Bun'an
