= Kyōgoku Takakazu (d. 1441) =

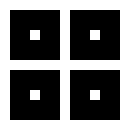
Arms of the Kyōgoku clan.

Kyōgoku Takakazu (京極 高数) (died 12 July 1441) was a Japanese noble member of the Kyōgoku Clan (Japanese: 京極氏 (Kyōgoku-shi)) of Japan who served the shōgun Ashikaga Yoshinori.

== Family Origins ==
The Kyōgoku Clan claimed their noble descent from Emperor Uda (868–897). The clan rose to prominence during the Sengoku and Edo periods when they would become a daimyō clan. A later Kyōgoku Takakazu became daimyō and head of the Kyōgoku clan in 1637.

== Biography ==
Kyōgoku Takakazu was named the Shugo of Yamashiro Province from 1421 to 1423. He was succeeded in this position by a member of the Kyōgoku clan, Kyōgoku Mochimitsu, though it is unclear whether the two were directly related.

Kyōgoku Takakazu was killed in 1441 during the Kakitsu no Hen, a rebellion during which the shōgun Ashikaga Yoshinori was assassinated by disaffected vassals at a dinner banquet hosted by Akamatsu Mitsusuke, one of the vassals who had been stripped of his lands and titles. Kyōgoku Takakazu died defending the Shogun along with Ōuchi Mochiyo (1394–1441) head of the Ōuchi clan who died later of his wounds on 28 July 1441. Kyōgoku Takakazu died during the incident on 12 July 1441 as he was cut down by Mitsusuke soldiers.

== See also ==
- Kakitsu no Hen
- Kyōgoku Clan
- Ashikaga Yoshinori

Preceded by Isshiki Yoshitsura	Shugo of Yamashiro Province; 1421–1423	Succeeded by Kyōgoku Mochimitsu
