= Nijō Mochimichi =

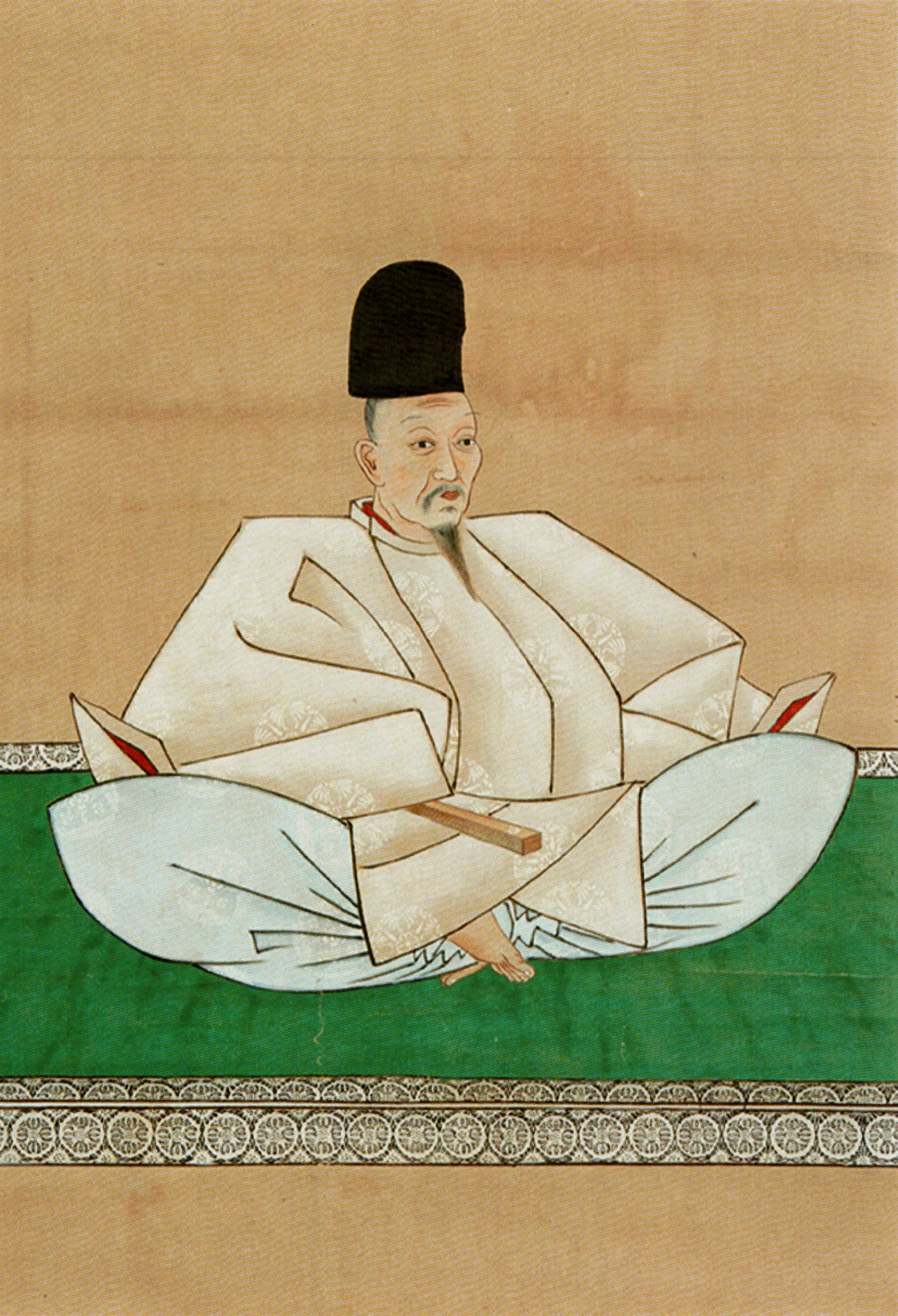

Nijō Mochimichi (二条 持通; 1416–1493), son of regent Nijō Motonori, was a Japanese kugyō (court noble) of the Muromachi period (1336–1573). He held a regent position kampaku three times from 1453 to 1454, from 1455 to 1458 and from 1463 to 1467. He was the father of regent Nijō Masatsugu. He was also the father of Son'ō Jugō (d.1514) who became the forty-fourth head of the Shōren-in monastery, a position traditionally assumed by imperial princes.
