= Ashikaga Yoshikatsu =

Military ruler of Japan from 1442 to 1443

- 足利 義勝
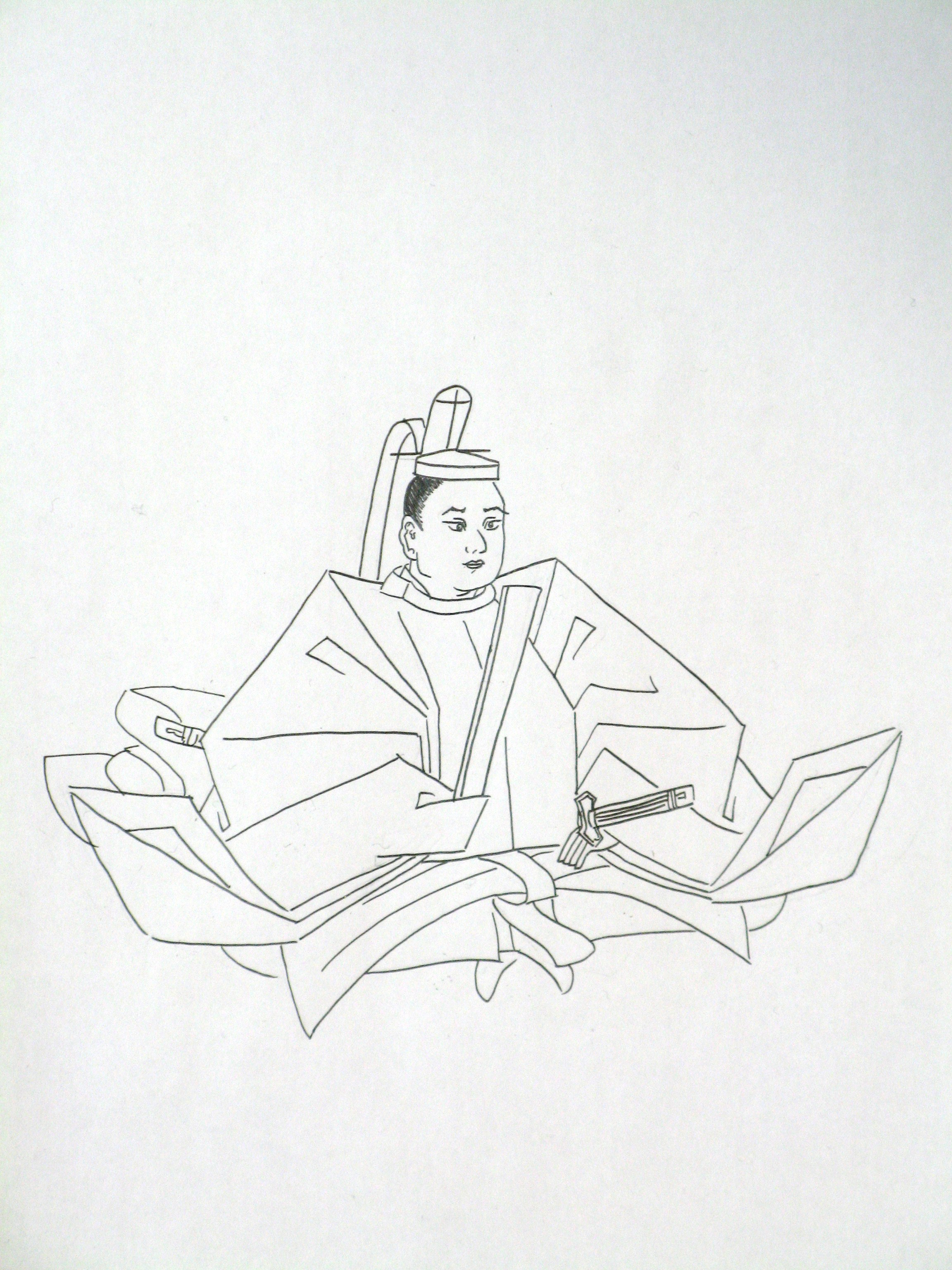

Shōgun
- In office 1441–1443
- Monarch: Go-Hanazono
- Preceded by: Ashikaga Yoshinori
- Succeeded by: Ashikaga Yoshimasa

Personal details
- Born: March 19, 1434
- Died: August 16, 1443 (aged 9)
- Parents: Ashikaga Yoshinori (father); Hino Shigeko (mother)

Ashikaga Yoshikatsu (足利 義勝; March 19, 1434 – August 16, 1443) was the seventh shōgun of the Ashikaga shogunate who reigned from 1442 to 1443 during the Muromachi period of Japan. Yoshikatsu was the son of the 6th shōgun Ashikaga Yoshinori with his concubine, Hino Shigeko (1411–1463). His childhood name was Chiyachamaru (千也茶丸). Hino Tomiko, wife of Ashikaga Yoshimasa, at first was betrothed to Yoshikatsu.

In 1441, Shōgun Yoshinori was murdered at the age of 48 by Akamatsu Mitsusuke. Shortly afterwards, it was determined that his 8-year-old son, Yoshikatsu, would become the new shōgun. Yoshikatsu is confirmed as shōgun the following year. On August 16, 1443, Yoshikatsu died at the age of 9. Fond of horseback riding, he was fatally injured in a fall from a horse. He had been shogun for only two years. His 8-year-old brother, Yoshinari, was then named shōgun. Several years after he became shogun, Yoshinari changed his name to Yoshimasa, and he is better known by that name.

== Era of Yoshikatsu's bakufu ==
The years in which Yoshikatsu was shōgun are more specifically identified by only one era name or nengō.

- Kakitsu (1441–1444)

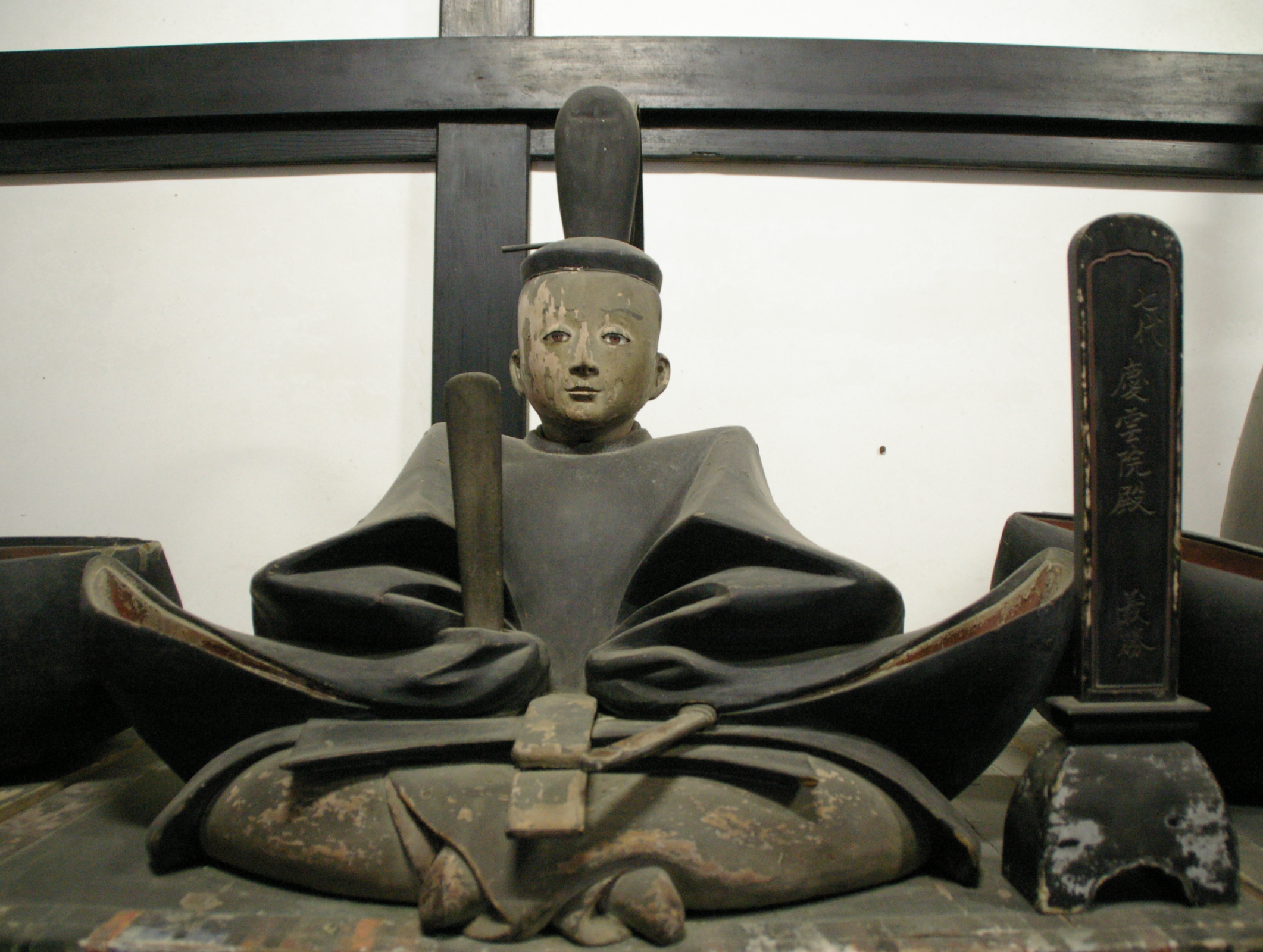
Wooden statue of Yoshikatsu at Tōji-in.

== See also ==
- East Asian age reckoning

== Notes ==
Preceded by Ashikaga Yoshinori	Shōgun: Ashikaga Yoshikatsu; 1442–1443	Succeeded by Ashikaga Yoshimasa
