= Ashikaga Yoshinori =

Military ruler of Japan from 1429 to 1441

- 足利 義教
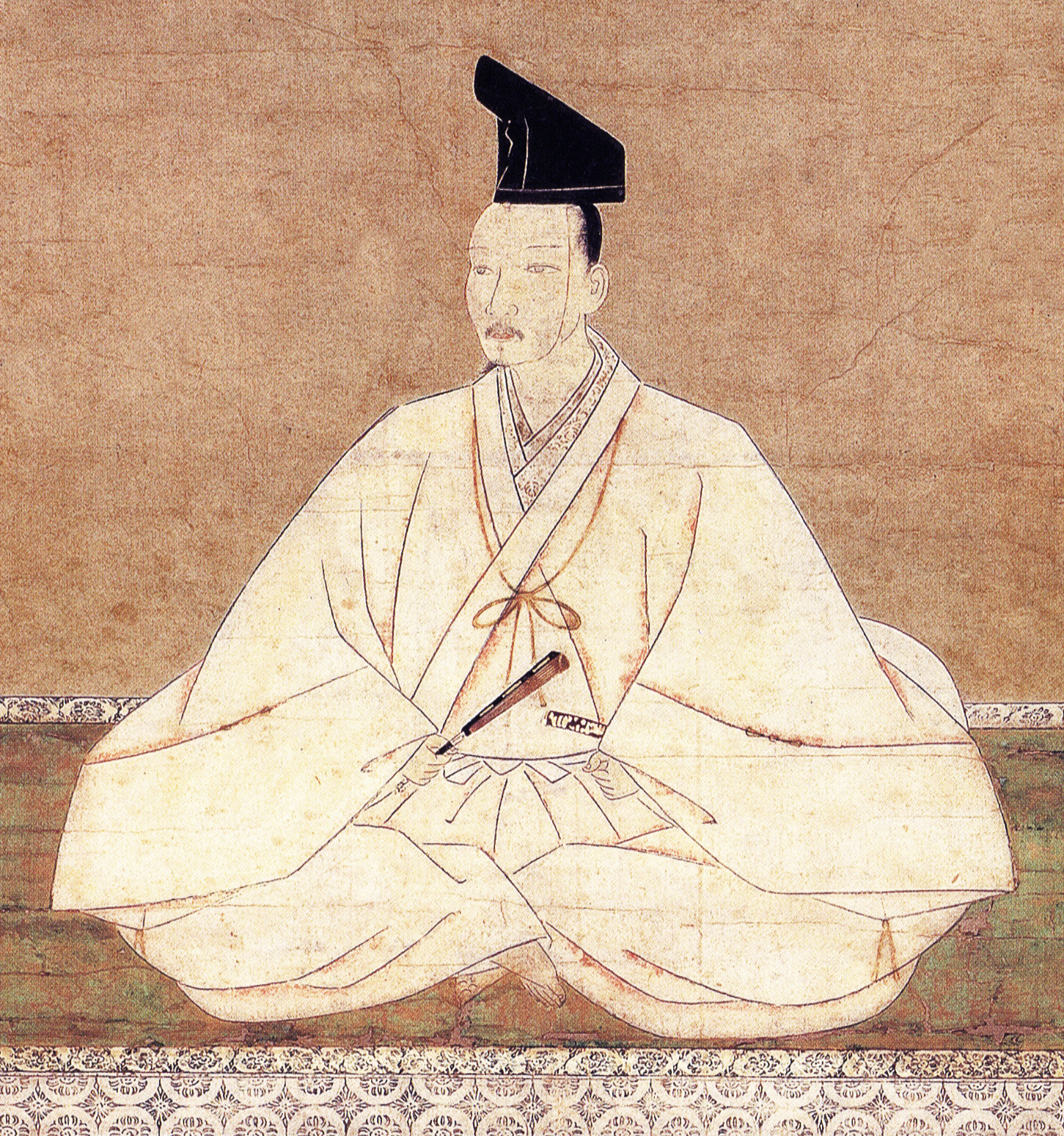

Shōgun
- In office 1428–1441
- Monarch: Go-Hanazono
- Preceded by: Ashikaga Yoshimochi
- Succeeded by: Ashikaga Yoshikatsu

Head Priest of Enryaku-ji Temple
- In office 1419–1428
- Preceded by: Shōgon
- Succeeded by: Chiben

Personal details
- Born: July 12, 1394
- Died: July 12, 1441 (aged 47)
- Spouse: Hino Muneko
- Children: Ashikaga Yoshikatsu; Ashikaga Masatomo; Ashikaga Yoshimasa; Ashikaga Yoshimi
- Parents: Ashikaga Yoshimitsu (father); Fujiwara no Yoshiko (mother)
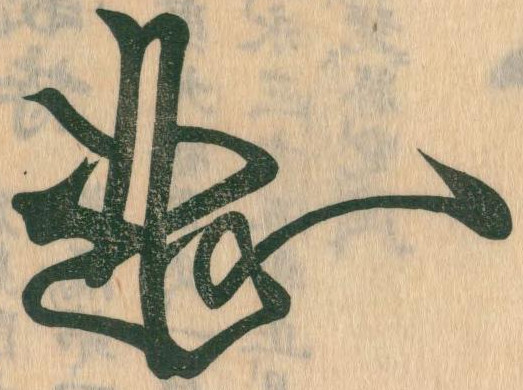
- Signature

Ashikaga Yoshinori (足利 義教; July 12, 1394 – July 12, 1441) was the sixth shōgun of the Ashikaga shogunate who reigned from 1429 to 1441 during the Muromachi period of medieval Japan. Yoshinori was the son of the third shōgun Ashikaga Yoshimitsu. His childhood name was Harutora (春寅). In 1433, he initiated the compilation of the last imperial waka anthology, Shinshoku Kokinwakashū, but was not satisfied with its compilation agenda which undermined his authority.

== Shogunal succession and reign ==
After the death of the fifth shōgun Ashikaga Yoshikazu in 1425, the fourth Shōgun Ashikaga Yoshimochi resumed his role as head of the shogunate. Yoshimochi had no other sons, nor did he name a successor before he himself died in 1428.

Yoshinori, who had been a Buddhist monk since the age of ten, became Sei-i Taishōgun on the day of Yoshimochi's death. From amongst the handful of possible Ashikaga candidates, his name was selected by the shogunal deputy (Kanrei), Hatakeyama Mitsuie, who drew lots in the sanctuary of Iwashimizu Hachiman Shrine in Kyoto; and it was believed that Hachiman's influence had affected this auspicious choice.

Yoshinori was appointed shōgun in 1429, one year before the surrender of the Southern Court. However during his reign, several rebellions erupted, including the Ōtomo rebellion and the uprising of rebel monks on Mount Hiei, both occurring in 1433; and the Eikyō Rebellion occurred under the leadership of Kantō kubō Ashikaga Mochiuji in 1438. Yoshinori strengthened the power of the shogunate by defeating Mochiuji, who committed suicide the following year as dissatisfaction with Yoshinori continued to grow.

During this period, Ming Chinese contacts were increased and Zen Buddhism gained influence, which had broad cultural consequences. For example, the Hon-dō or main hall at Ikkyu-ji is today the oldest standing Tang-style temple in the Yamashiro (southern Kyoto Prefecture) and Yamato (Nara Prefecture) Provinces. It was built in 1434 and was dedicated by Yoshinori.

The Yasaka Pagoda at Hokanji in Kyoto was destroyed by fire in 1436 but was reconstructed four years later by Yoshinori.

Earlier in 1432, the samurai Akamatsu Mitsusuke had fled the region and later murders Yoshinori in the Kakitsu Incident; Akamatsu is in turn killed by Yamana.

== Foreign relations ==
In 1432, trade and diplomatic relations between the shogunate and Ming China were restored. Both had been discontinued by Yoshimochi. The Chinese emperor reached out to Japan by sending a letter to the shogunate via the kingdom of the Ryūkyū Islands; Yoshinori responded favorably. Receiving the Ming-designated title "King of Japan" allowed Yoshinori to monopolize Japan's trade with China, advantaging him over local lords.

According to Mansai Jugo Nikki (満済准后日記), the system of the Tosen-bugyō (唐船奉行) was established in 1434 to mediate overseas trade. The functions of the Tosen-bugyō included: (1) guarding trading ships in Japanese waters, (2) procuring export goods, (3) mediating between the Muromachi shogunate and shipping interests, and (4) managing record-keeping. It is significant that the Muromachi shogunate was the first to appoint the executive officers of the samurai class to high positions in its diplomatic bureaucracy. After Yoshinori's time, the totosen (渡唐船) (the fleet of ships going from Japan to Ming China) consisted of the ships belonging principally to three different kinds of owners: the Muromachi shōgun, shrines and temples, and the shugo daimyō.

In 1441, Yoshinori granted the Shimazu clan suzerainty over the Ryūkyū Islands.

== Assassination and succession ==
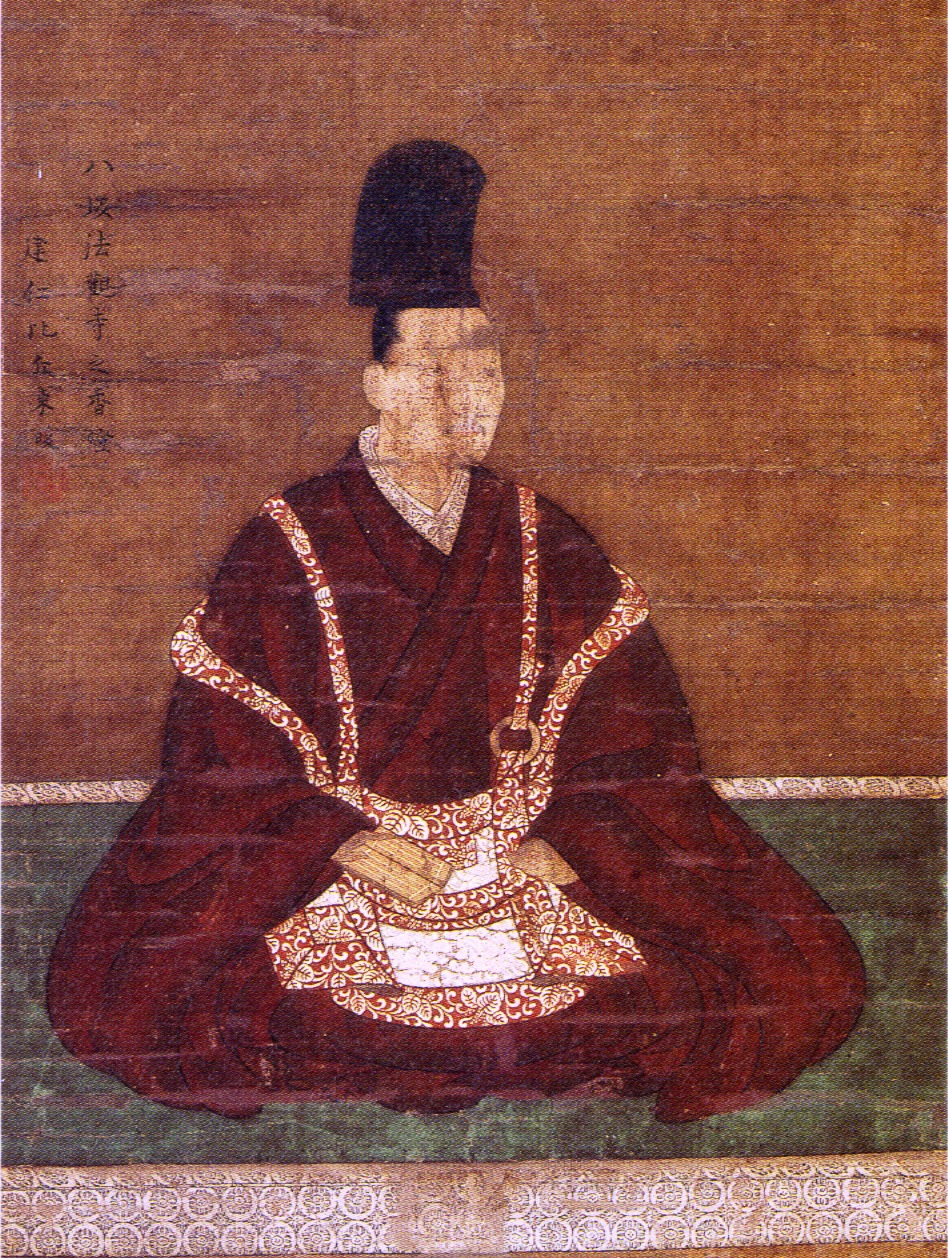
Portrait of Ashikaga Yoshinori in tonsure stored at Hōkan-ji.

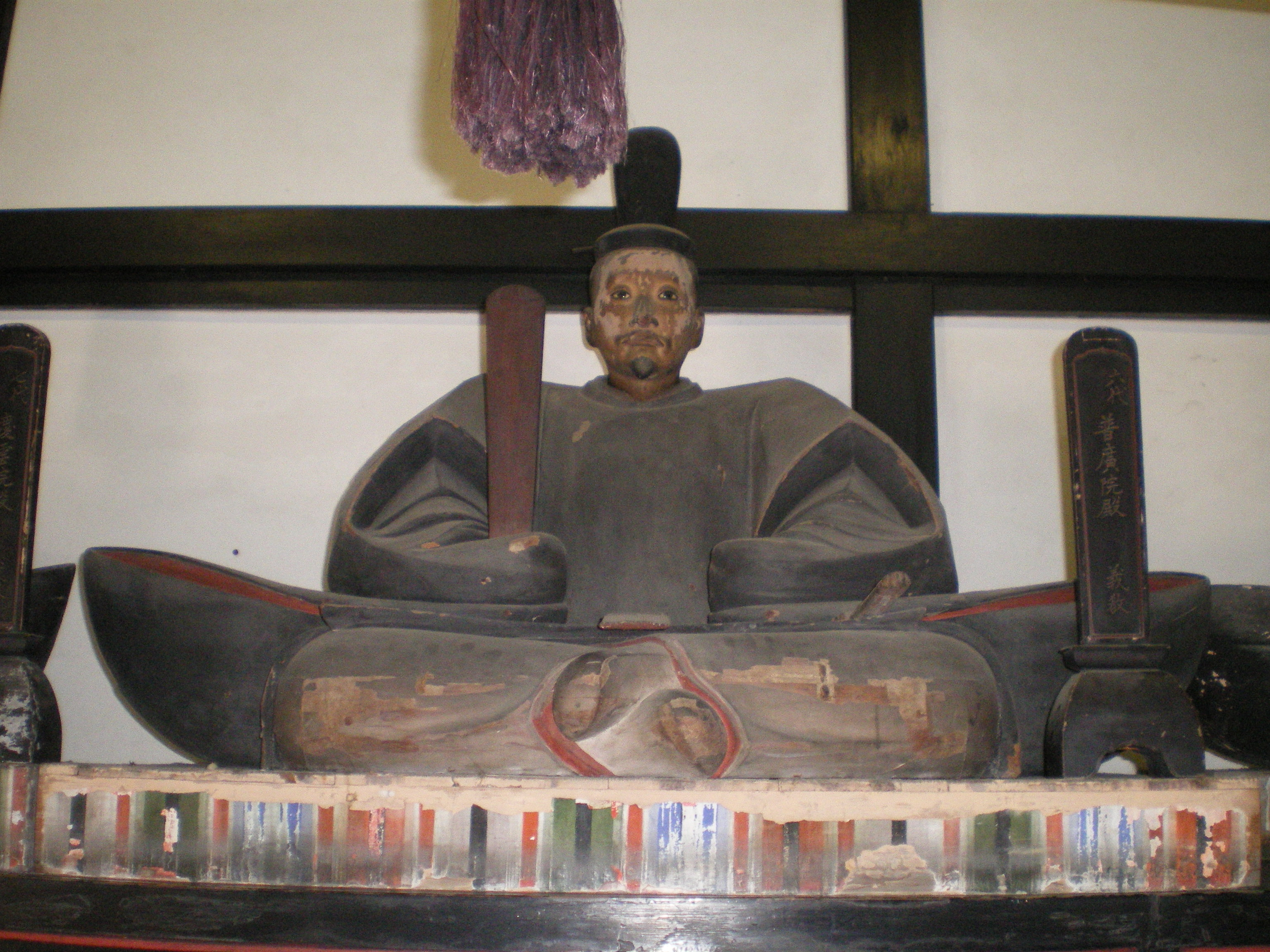
Wooden staue of Ashikaga Yoshinori at Tōji-in.

Yoshinori was notorious for his oppressive measures and unpredictable dictatorial whims. In 1441, Yoshinori was assassinated by Akamatsu Noriyasu, son of Akamatsu Mitsusuke who invited him to a Noh performance at their residence in Kyoto and assassinated him during the evening play. Yoshinori was 47 at the age of his assassination which was organized by Mitsusuke, who had learned that Yoshinori planned to bestow three provinces belonging to him to his cousin Akamatsu Sadamura, who came to be given an important position by Yoshinori because Sadamura's younger sister became his concubine and gave birth to a son.

Shortly thereafter, it was determined that his 8-year-old son, Yoshikatsu, would become the new shōgun. Akamatsu Mitsusuke had already a problem in 1427 with the fifth Shogun Ashikaga Yoshimochi, who tried to confiscate his territory; Mitsusuke burned down his own residence in Kyoto and went to own Harima province, and gathered his family and retainer to prepare for the battle. This infuriated Yoshimochi, who ordered to search and kill them, but the confusion continued as those who were ordered to subjugate them refused to dispatch troops. Another person who died in the incident was Yamana Hirotaka (Shugo of Iwami province), Kyogoku Takakazu (Shugo of Yamashiro, Izumo, Oki and Hida province), and Ouchi Mochiyo (Shugo of Suo, Nagato, Buzen and Chikuzen province). Mitsusuke confined himself in Yamashiro Castle, and died with 69 members of his family on October 12, after he was attacked by the shogunal army.

Although the Ashikaga line continued through this seventh shogun, the power of the shōguns gradually eroded and the shogunate fell into decline. The mere fact of that assassination and treason had become a reality served to undercut the previous military ethic of loyalty.

== Family ==
- Father: Ashikaga Yoshimitsu
- Mother: Fujiwara no Yoshiko (1358–1399)
- Wives:
  - Hino Muneko (d. 1447)
  - Sanjo Yoshiko, daughter of Sanjo Masaaki
- Concubines:
  - Hino Shigeko (1411–1463)
  - Kozaisho no Tsubone
  - Shoben-dono
  - Otomi no Kata, daughter of Tamagawa no Miya and granddaughter of Emperor Chōkei
- Children:
  - Ashikaga Yoshikatsu by Shigeko
  - Ashikaga Yoshimasa by Shigeko
  - Daijin'in by Shigeko
  - Ashikaga Yoshikano later Shogoin by Shigeko
  - a daughter by Kozaisho
  - Ashikaga Yoshimi by Kozaisho
  - Ashikaga Masatomo (1435–1491) by Shoben
  - Ashikaga Yoshinaga by Shoben
  - Kosho'in
  - Sankyo

== Eras of Yoshinori's bakufu ==
The years in which Yoshinori was shogun are more specifically identified by more than one era name or nengō.

- Eikyō (1429–1441)
- Kakitsu (1441–1444)

== Notes ==
Preceded by Ashikaga Yoshikazu	Shōgun: Ashikaga Yoshinori; 1429–1441	Succeeded by Ashikaga Yoshikatsu
