= Nijō Motonori =

Japanese poet and courtier of the Muromachi period

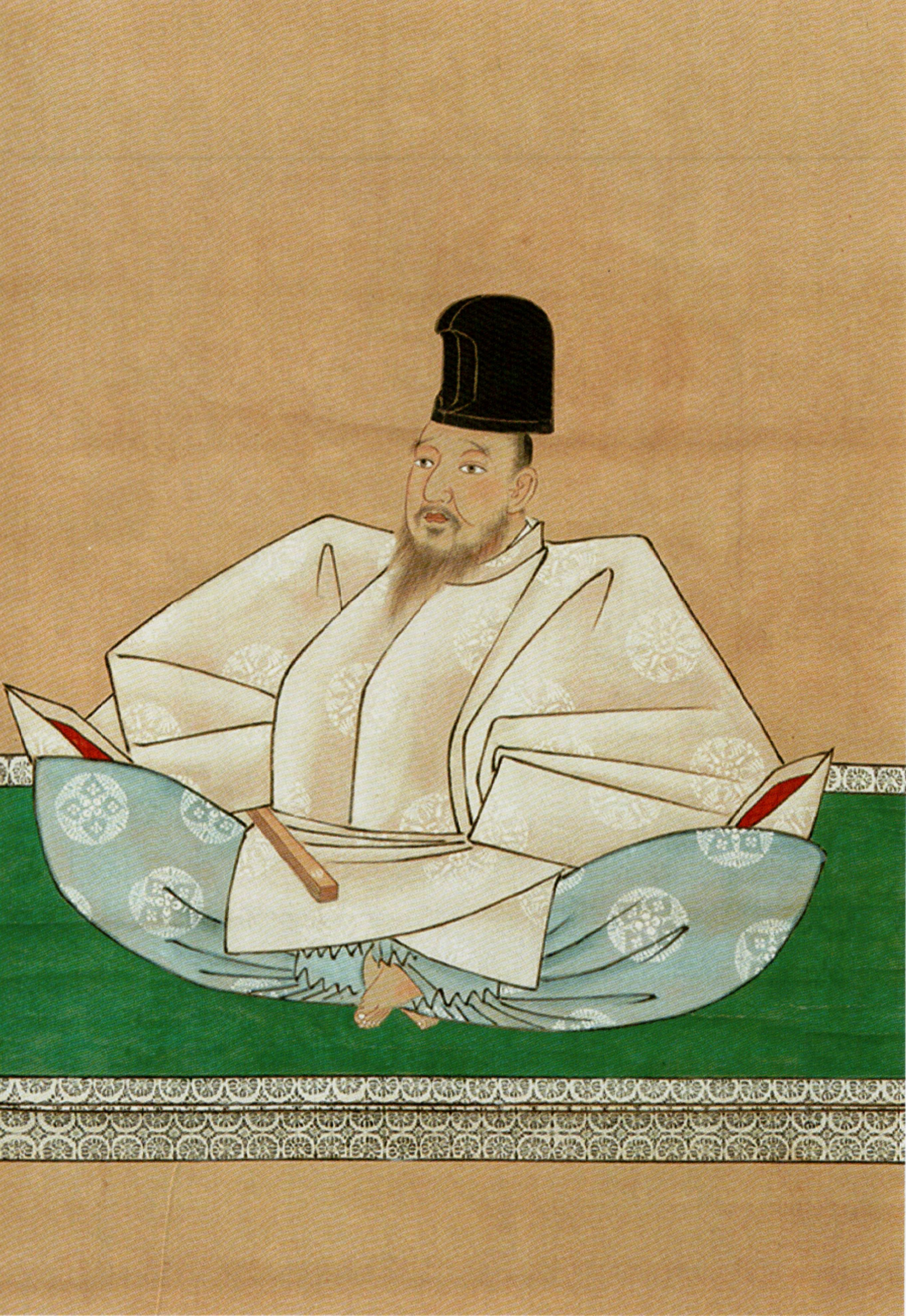

Nijō Motonori (二条 基教; 1390 – 1445), son of regent Nijō Morotsugu, was a Japanese poet and kugyō (court noble) of the Muromachi period (1336–1573). Later, he became known as Nijō Mochimoto (二条 持基). He held regent positions kampaku two times from 1424 to 1428 and from 1433 to 1445, and sesshō two times from 1428 to 1432 and from 1432 to 1433. He was the father of Nijō Mochimichi.
