= Akamatsu Mitsusuke =

Japanese samurai

- Emblem (mon) of the Akamatsu clan
- Born: 1381
- Died: September 25, 1441 (aged 59–60)
- Era: Muromachi Period

Akamatsu Mitsusuke (赤松 満祐; 1381 – September 25, 1441) was a Japanese samurai of the Akamatsu clan during the Muromachi Period. Other sources say he was born in 1373.

== Family ==
Mitsusuke was the son of Akamatusu Yoshinori and father of Akamatsu Noriyasu.

== Assassination of the Shogun and death ==
In 1441, Mitsusuke killed the reigning Ashikaga shogunate, Ashikaga Yoshinori, in response to the Shogun's choice of one of his rivals, Akamatsu Sadaura, as head of the clan. In response, he was attacked by forces of the Yamana clan and the Hosokawa clan. In defeat, he was forced to commit suicide.
