= Furuichi clan =

Clan of Japan

The Furuichi clan (古市氏, Furuichi-shi, also read Furuchi-shi) is a clan of Japan. Place names called Furuichi-gō existed in Furuichi District of Kawachi Province, in Higashinari (Higashinari District) of Settsu Province, in Shiga District of Ōmi Province, and elsewhere, and the name derives from them.

== Furuichi clan of Yamato ==
Furuichi clan 古市氏
- Buke (warrior house)
- Maru ni kaede (maple leaf in a circle)
- Parent family: Kiyohara clan?
- Place of origin: Furuichi, Soekami District, Yamato Province
- Members: Furuichi Chōin

The Furuichi of Yamato were a kokujin (provincial warrior) family based at Furuichi in Soekami District, Yamato Province, the present-day Furuichi-chō in Nara. They were shuto (armed clerics) attached to the Daijō-in branch of Kōfuku-ji, and they built Furuichi Castle.

=== Origins and base ===
The site of Furuichi was once a market called 福島市. When its lord, the monzeki (abbot) of the Daijō-in, moved the market inside the Daijō-in's own district as the South Market (南市), the former site came to be called Furuichi ("old market").

As for the family's origin, the 和州国民郷土記 says that they were of the Kiyohara clan and descendants of Prince Toneri, and the 聞書覚書 (in the 大和志料) says that they were descendants of Kiyohara no Natsuno, who had lived at Furuichi. Both, however, are sources of the early modern period, and there is no confirmation.

The home settlement of Furuichi-gō was surrounded by a moat and contained five machi (wards); village heads (shōya) and deputies (daikan) were placed there. They collected taxes but also represented the community, and the wards and villages ran annual observances such as festivals on their own. Shimizu Katsuyuki, stressing this autonomy, argues that the Furuichi clan's control over the settlement has been overestimated, and that the moat around it should be seen as one of the moated villages (kangō) found widely in Yamato. He also holds that Furuichi Castle was not large enough to take in the town below it, and that it is reasonable to regard it as confined to the area of the aza (sub-district) named 古城 (old castle), the site of the present 光ヶ丘高円団地 housing estate.

=== Successive heads ===
When the family began to use the name Furuichi is unknown, but the name Furuichi Tajima-no-kimi appears in Shōchū 2 (1325). On the 4th day of the 12th month of the same year, the Daijō-in abbot 覚尊 left the 禅定院 (Zenjō-in) and moved to this Tajima-no-kimi (中臣祐臣記). Inaba Nobumichi sees this as a case in which the abbot relied on Tajima-no-kimi, a gobōnin (retainer of the abbot) who appears to have been the core of the abbot's armed force, and argues that the Daijō-in depended on the strength of the Furuichi. In Shitoku 3 (1386), Furuichi Inken took office as one of the 衆中沙汰衆 (executive officers of the shuto assembly) together with Tsutsui Junkaku and others, and the family had become the leading shuto of the Daijō-in side.

When the Daijō-in monzeki Kyōkaku and the Tsutsui clan came into conflict from Kakitsu 2 (1442), Inken's grandson Insen fought on Kyōkaku's side.

Insen died in Kyōtoku 2 (1453), and his son In'ei succeeded him. When the Ōnin War began in Ōnin 1 (1467), In'ei joined the Western Army. In'ei tightened his control over his retainers, for example by taking judicial authority within the house into his own hands, but, perhaps because this provoked opposition from kinsmen and vassals, he retired in Bunmei 7 (1475).

After In'ei's retirement his younger brother Chōin became head of the family. Since the Ōnin War the kokujin of Yamato had been divided into the Tsutsui faction and the Ochi faction, and Chōin acted as a leading figure of the Ochi faction second only to Ochi Iehide. At first the Ochi faction had the upper hand, and under Chōin the Furuichi reached their peak, but in Meiō 6 (1497) they were defeated in battle by the Tsutsui faction and went into decline. A peace was then concluded among the kokujin of Yamato, excluding the Furuichi, and Chōin sided with Akazawa Tomotsune and Nagatsune, commanders of the Hosokawa clan who invaded Yamato, and fought against the Yamato kokujin.

After Chōin was killed in battle in Eishō 5 (1508), fighting between the Tsutsui side and the Ochi side broke out again in Yamato, and Chōin's successor Kōin joined the Ochi side. Furuichi Castle, the family seat, was taken several times during this period, and under Kōin it became difficult to hold. The Furuichi came to rely mainly on Hachibuse Castle on the ridge (the 山ノ城 of the sources) and on Obirao and Ōji (邑地) in the eastern hills (東山内). Thereafter the Furuichi alternately fought and made peace with the Tsutsui side, and when Matsunaga Hisahide, a retainer of the Miyoshi clan, advanced into Yamato in Eiroku 2 (1559), they followed him.

=== Character of their power ===
==== Kinsmen and retainers ====
Asakura Hiroshi tentatively calls the league centred on the Furuichi the "Furuichi faction" (Furuichi-tō). Unlike the six leagues that served as sponsors (願主人) of the Kasuga Wakamiya festival, no connection with the festival appears in the sources, but the entry for the 1st day of the 10th month of Meiō 6 (1497) in the Daijō-in Jisha Zōjiki names, as kokujin belonging to this league, the Furuichi, Yamamura, Nagai (Nagai), Tsubao (椿尾), Yamada (山田), 佐川, 木津, Fukuzumi (Fukuzumi), Uryū, Banjō (Banjō) and Kushira (Kushira). Asakura cautions, however, that this is not the whole membership. Of these, the Kushira clan is described as distant relatives of the Furuichi through a brother in an entry of the Daijō-in Jisha Zōjiki for the 29th day of the 9th month of Bunmei 13 (1481) listing the relatives of shuto and kokumin.

Tanaka Keiji divides the Furuichi kin into "traditional kinsmen" and "fictive kinsmen". The former were the Yamamura, 鞆田, 室, Yoshida, 見塔院, Inoue, Nagata (Inagaki) and Nagai.

These kinsmen were permitted by the main line to use a double surname prefixed with "Furuichi", such as Furuichi Yamamura, Furuichi Nagata, Furuichi 室 and Furuichi Inoue. Many were also allowed to use "In" (胤), the character shared by the Furuichi in their personal names, and some styled themselves with court-type titles such as Chikuzen-no-kami or Ōmi-no-kami.

Among the vassals, the wakatō (wakatō) ranked as samurai in social status. In a roster of the 5th day of the 11th month of Bunmei 12 (1480), two wakatō are classed as "of samurai status" (侍分), and they were entitled to ride on horseback; there is even a case of one bearing the title Yamashiro-no-kami. By contrast, chūgen and 矢負 (quiver bearers) were of commoner (bonge) status, and there was a clear gap between the two groups. Whereas earlier scholars saw the wakatō as commoners seeking samurai status, Tanaka holds that in Yamato hereditary samurai formed the core of the wakatō, with newly risen samurai around them.

The origins of the wakatō fall into four groups: cadet branches of the Furuichi kin; cadet branches of shuto and kokumin other than the Furuichi kin; men of local landholding families (dogō); and men promoted from commoner status. 松岡孫三郎近忠 and 長井九郎左衛門 came from local landholding families, and 北野山主計入道 was promoted from commoner status. In the grant of titles of the 12th month of Meiō 2 (1493), 井上九郎 of the kin was made Ōmi-no-kami and the wakatō 松川新九郎 was made Zusho-no-suke; these were official appointments, not self-assumed titles.

There were also cases of vassals rising in status. The 狭川 had originally been wakatō of the Koizumi (Koizumi clan) but rose to the status of shuto and kokumin; the Daijō-in Jisha Zōjiki for the 9th day of the 12th month of Bunmei 14 (1482) says, "the 狭川 were originally wakatō of the Koizumi, and have risen" (狭川事本小泉之若党也、成上申). On this occasion the 狭川 invoked their marriage ties with Furuichi In'ei, and they belonged to both the Tsutsui side and the Furuichi side.

In the 8th month of Eishō 3 (1506), these kinsmen and vassals were attacked in their home villages. The Tamon-in Nikki records that on the 16th, through the work of the Tsutsui foot soldiers (ashigaru), "Furuichi Yamamura, Fujiwara, Yokoi, Nagai and the rest" (古市山村・藤原・横井・長井以下) were burned without exception, and that the Tsutsui force went straight on into Nara, where Furuichi Tango-dono, who was in Nara, crossed 葛籠 and fled.

==== Control of the retainer band ====
It was in In'ei's time that the kin and retainers came to be firmly bound together. In a case of killing between retainers at Furuichi Castle in Chōroku 2 (1458), the party who struck did not settle the matter by private fighting, but first petitioned the lord, obtained permission, then killed his opponent and reported afterwards. The relatives of the side that was killed in return likewise chose litigation rather than revenge. The Furuichi judged the cases by their own authority: the killing done with permission was left unpunished, while the other, even though it was self-defence, was ruled a capital offence and the culprit was executed on the spot. Tanaka Keiji sees this ruling, which rejected self-help through private fighting to this degree, as an early form of the law of kenka ryōseibai (equal punishment of both parties to a quarrel). A power that suppressed self-help to this extent would normally not appear until Toyotomi Hideyoshi's sword hunt, and in that respect, he says, the Furuichi's justice was about 130 years ahead of the country as a whole.

Control extended to the kin as well. In Bunshō 1 (1466), Yamamura Inkei, a powerful kinsman who had long supported In'ei since he became head as a child, was expelled for defying In'ei's wishes. In Bunmei 2 (1470), two vassals were executed and thirty kinsmen and wakatō were driven out. Jinson, who recorded this, called it pitiable but unavoidable, which suggests that such punishments by the Furuichi were regarded as natural. Tanaka sees these as moves of the same kind as the Mōri clan's destruction of the Inoue family (Tenbun 19, 1550), and notes that the Furuichi's control came more than 80 years earlier.

==== Economic base ====
Furuichi, their home base, was a key point of communication commanding the Kamitsumichi road. From here the Furuichi gained control over the bashaku, who were both carriers of goods and petty merchants, and over the toll barriers (seki) on the roads.

In the 4th month of Bun'an 4 (1447), Insen received at Furuichi the former abbot Kyōkaku, who had been driven out of the Daijō-in. Kyōkaku spent the 27 years until his death in Bunmei 5 (1473) at the Geifuku-ji in Furuichi. In the 7th month of the same year, when bashaku uprisings (ikki) broke out in Yamato, Ōmi, Kawachi, Yamashiro and elsewhere, a rumour arose that Kyōkaku and Insen had set the bashaku in motion to destroy Nanto (Nara), and the shuto assembly imposed a censure (shūkan) on the two. Kyōkaku was indignant at the uprising in his diary and the charge was false, but Tanaka Keiji considers that Insen, who was closely tied to the bashaku, may well have organised and supported it.

As for toll barriers, it was Kyōkaku who could appoint the 御問職 (agent) of the Kizu (Kizu) ferry, and holding his person was the basis of the Furuichi's control. In Bunmei 4 (1472) they held the main barrier at 狛, and together with their advance into southern Yamashiro from Bunmei 2 (1470), they appear to have held the de facto position of shugodai (deputy governor), backed by Hatakeyama Yoshinari and Ōuchi Masahiro of the Western Army. In Meiō 2 (1493), after the collapse of the Yamashiro Province uprising, they were formally appointed shugodai of Yamashiro. They also set up new barriers in southern Yamashiro, and whenever Jinson went up to the capital or an abbot travelled down, he asked Chōin or the kinsman Inoue Ōmi-no-kami for passage through the barriers. In the 10th month of Entoku 2 (1490) they set the bashaku of Shimokoma and Kizu in motion and caused an uprising.

==== Quarters within the temple ====
Sons of the Furuichi, as shuto of the Daijō-in side, entered the Kōfuku-ji quarters (bōsha) Hosshin-in generation after generation: Giin, son of Inken (胤憲); Chōin, son of Insen; and 覚胤, adopted son (yūshi) of In'ei; relatives of the Furuichi served as its head until the Tenshō era. Kyōkaku, too, noted that the Hosshin-in had a historical connection with the Furuichi.

The authority to appoint and dismiss the head lay with the Daijō-in. It was the Furuichi, however, who chose the successor, and the chosen successor paid the Furuichi a fee of 200 hiki. There is also a case in which Jinson demanded the fee for a change of head from the Furuichi rather than from the monks of the quarters. Hatakama Kazuhiro sees these as evidence that the Furuichi regarded the Hosshin-in as part of their family's property.

The Hosshin-in was also the Furuichi's base in Nara. It became customary for the Kasuga lecture (Kasuga-kō) of the shuto assembly to be held at the Hosshin-in with the Furuichi as the presiding officer (tōyaku), and meetings of the scholar-monks (gakuryo) and of the roppō were also held there.

=== Culture ===
When Kyoto became a battlefield in the Ōnin War, many court nobles took refuge with their sons who were serving as abbots and temple heads in Nara, and men of culture such as renga masters came and went with them. Nanto already had a foundation in the renga gatherings dedicated to Tenjin and the performing arts of the Kasuga Wakamiya festival, and with the addition of the culture of the capital, tea, renga, furyū, Noh and kemari spread rapidly. Ishii Tomoko called this era the "Nanto Renaissance" and placed Chōin as its embodiment.

His position as head (tōryō) of the Kanpu shuto was not unrelated to this. The kanpu shuto were warrior monks permitted to marry; they carried out policing and justice throughout the province, proclaimed debt cancellations (tokusei), and took part in maintaining the temple and the shrine, and they also held the right to stage new sarugaku and the performing arts of the Kasuga Wakamiya festival. The tōryō was the one who carried these out.

In the tea ceremony, Chōin is known as a senior disciple of Murata Jukō. The Yamanoue Sōji ki names him as one of Jukō's disciples, saying "Furuichi Harima of Nanto in Washū is Jukō's foremost disciple, a man of taste and a master" (和州南都古市播州ハ珠光第一ノ弟子也、数奇者、名人ナリ). The 心の文 ("Letter on the heart"), in which Jukō set out his precepts on tea, is also addressed to "Furuichi Harima Hōshi". The 松屋名物集 shows that Chōin owned many famous utensils associated with Jukō, such as 大海, 文琳, 白錦 and 大島; he seems to have been his patron as well as his disciple.

His elder brother In'ei was fond of rinkan chanoyu. It was one of the events of Urabon: a tea room was set up in a bathhouse, furyū decorations were placed in the bath, tea was served and a banquet was held. The records of Bunmei 1 (1469), when it was at its height, repeatedly show In'ei serving as the host (tōyaku), and it was also an event to relieve the tedium of Kyōkaku, who was living in retirement at Furuichi. There is no case of Chōin himself hosting rinkan chanoyu, but in the 1st month of Bunmei 13 (1481) he acted as "tea master" (茶頭) and held a large gathering, bearing all the costs himself.

In Noh he supported the Konparu troupe (Konparu-za). Furuichi patronage predated Chōin, but he was only two years apart in age from Konparu Zenpō, and he is said to have supported him strongly, even using his own authority. Zenpō's collection of talks on the art, the 禅鳳雑談, contains comments on Chōin's chanting, which shows that Chōin learned utai from Zenpō. He is also said to have been a skilled player of the shakuhachi.

The Furuichi also cultivated furyū, and Insen held renga gatherings within Furuichi Castle. His sons In'ei and Chōin also practised renga and the tea ceremony. Court nobles (kuge) and performers who had come down to Nara to escape the Ōnin War are said to have taken part in the gatherings Chōin hosted. Konparu Zenchiku and his son 宗筠 also sat in the monthly renga gatherings held at the Furuichi residence. Chōin was on close terms with Inawashiro Kensai, from whom he received the 心敬僧都庭訓. Chōin held renga gatherings not only at his own residence but also at temples where he was in retreat and in camp during battles. Three of his verses were included in the Shinsen Tsukubashū under the name "Gon-no-risshi Chōin".

=== Genealogy ===
A genealogy of the Furuichi is appended to volume 3 of the Daijō-in Nikki Mokuroku. Insei (胤盛) does not appear there and has been added on the basis of the 祐維記抄.

Furuichi Tajima-no-kimi
Inken (胤賢)
Inken (胤憲)
Insen	Giin	胤俊
In'ei	Chōin
Insei	Kōin

== Furuichi clan of Kaga ==
=== Overview ===
The Furuichi of Kaga began with the migration of Furuichi Taneie (古市五左衛門胤家), a descendant of Furuichi Harima-no-kami, lord of Furuichi Castle. Taneie served the kanpaku Konoe Nobutada and was given the post of naishi, then served Tōdō Takatsugu, later lord of the Tsu Domain in Ise, and afterwards moved to Kaga. The family crest is the same maru ni kaede as that of the Yamato Furuichi.

Taneie's son Furuichi Taneshige was a warrior who served Maeda Toshitsune, the second lord of the Kaga Domain, in the early Edo period. His common name was 左近. He entered Toshitsune's service young with a stipend of 3,630 koku, and on his lord's death he followed him in death (junshi, by suicide) at the age of 34. His heir was his younger brother Furuichi Kanemoto, a samurai who served Maeda Tsunanori and a Confucian scholar who studied under Zhu Shunshui. Kanemoto also died of illness in his thirties and the Kaga Furuichi came to an end, but descendants of 理助 of the Echizen Furuichi, described below, served the successive lords of the Kaga Domain.

=== Genealogy ===
Furuichi Harima-no-kami Chōin
Furuichi Awa-no-kami 胤慶
Furuichi Harima-no-kami In'ei
古市久兵衛胤勝	Furuichi Taneko (三位の局)
Furuichi Taneie (古市五左衛門胤家)	赤井権左衛門	赤井直重
古市胤光 (head of the Kōfuku-ji Hosshin-in)	Furuichi 左近 Taneshige line extinct	Furuichi Kanemoto line extinct	古市胤治	Wife of 品川左門権直

== Furuichi clan of Echizen ==
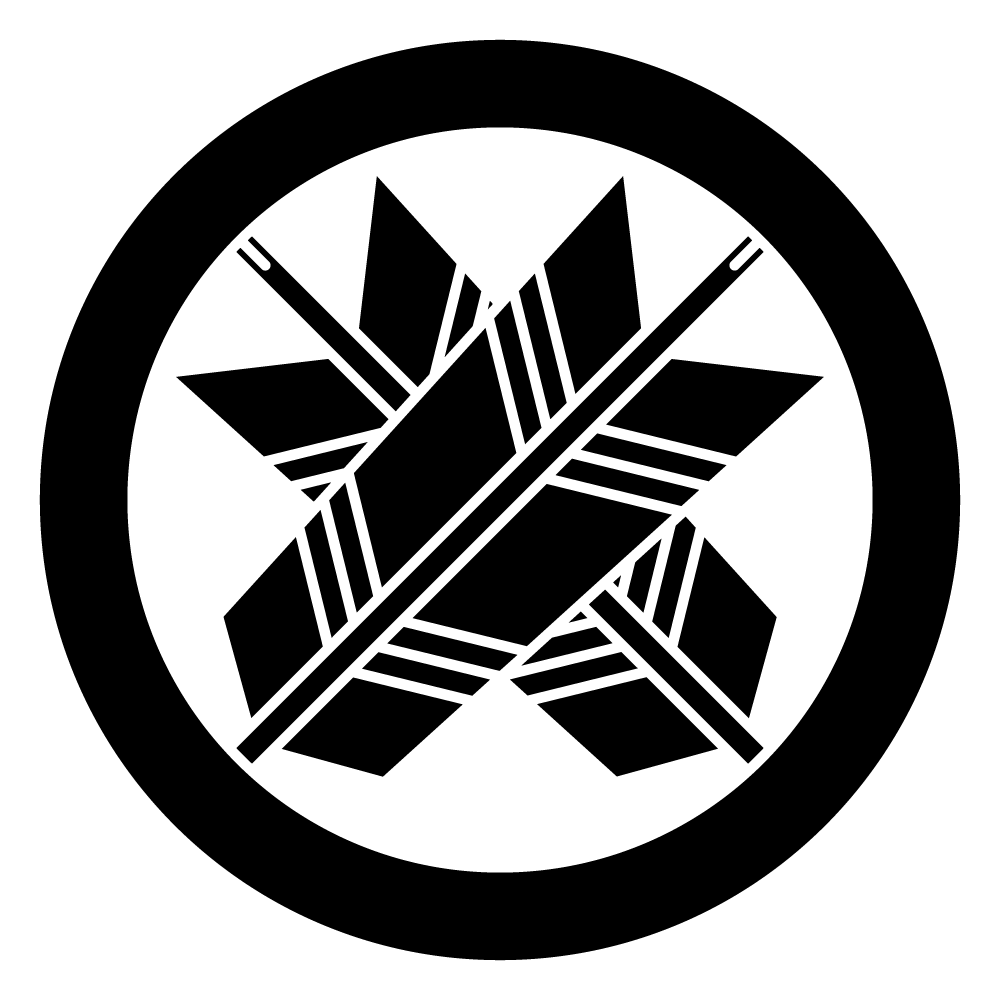
Family crest (Togano Furuichi)

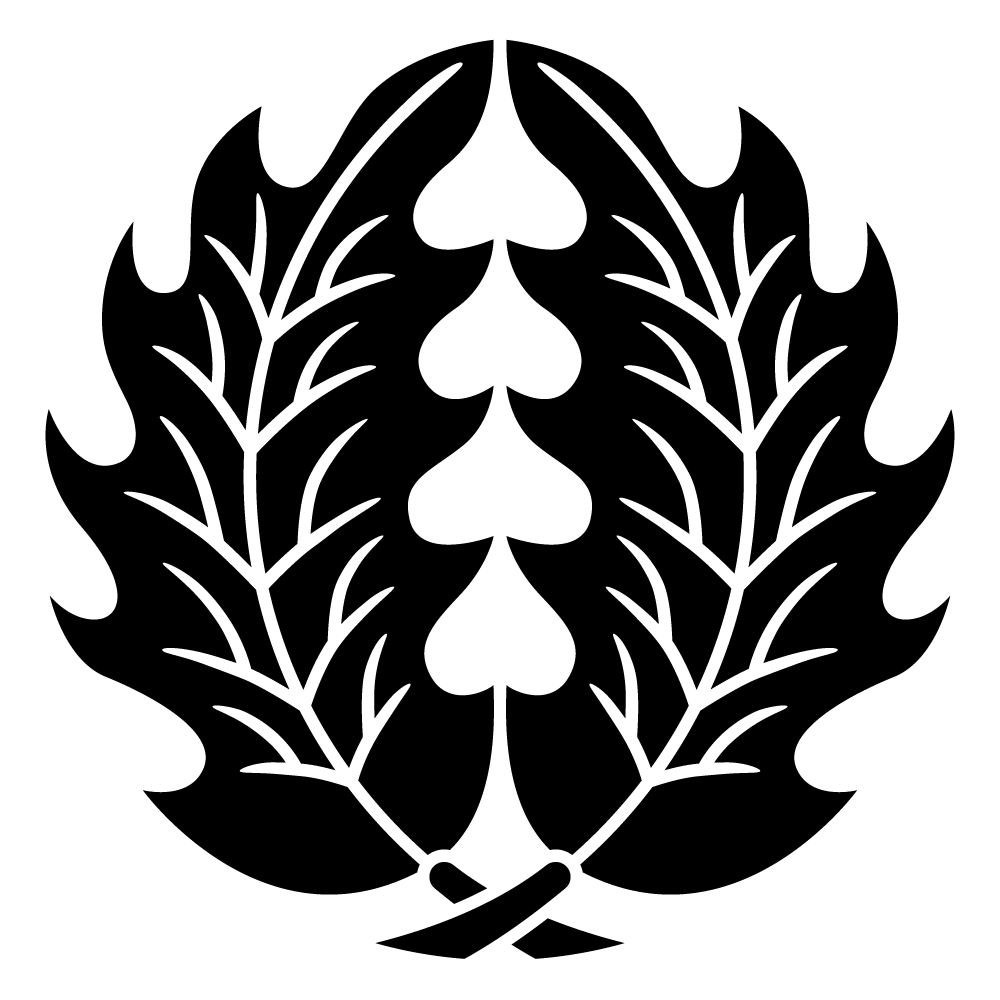
Family crest (Shikununo Furuichi)

The origin of the Echizen Furuichi is uncertain, but several Furuichi are recorded in the records of the estates owned by Kōfuku-ji in Echizen Province.

The "Echizen Province Asuwa District Office Notice" (越前国足羽郡庁牒), dated 24 November 951 (Tenryaku 5, 10th month, 23rd day), is a report from the district office of Asuwa District to the estate revenue officers of Tōdai-ji. It states that the Tōdai-ji estates in the district, Chimori-no-shō, 鎧荘 and 糞置荘, lay within the jōri grid but were "originally either wasteland or marshland", with no tenants to cultivate them, and that 糞置荘 in particular was "something never heard of".

Eight people signed at the end of this notice: a member of the Ikue clan serving as kengyō and general steward of the 方上御庄; five acting dairyō (district chiefs; two of the Ikue clan, two of the Asuwa clan and one of the Furuichi clan); and two acting shōryō (of the Ikue and Hata clans). The Furuichi name appears among the five acting dairyō.

In the Muromachi period, the family administered 本荘 (the present 本荘 area of Awara) and 藤澤 (the present Mikuni-chō 藤沢 in Sakai) of the Kawaguchi-no-shō, a Kōfuku-ji estate, and 桶川 within the Tsuboe-no-shō. In the early Sengoku period, however, on 23 July 1470 (Bunmei 2, 6th month, 25th day), Asakura Takakage, who was close to completing the conquest of Echizen, informed Furuichi In'ei that he had decided that "the whole of the Tsuboe estate shall be held by Asakura". This marked the decline of Kōfuku-ji and the end of the estate culture.

In the Sengoku period, 古市藤五郎, a son of Furuichi Harima-no-kami (whether Chōin or In'ei is unknown), was taken into the service of Asakura Yoshikage with 500 koku but was killed at the battle of 敷地口 against the Kaga Ikkō-ikki; 藤五郎's heir 理助 was taken into the service of Mukai Suruga-no-kami (Mukai Hisaie) of Echizen with 300 koku.

Among the retainers of Matsudaira Naoyoshi, first lord of the Ōno Domain in Echizen, the name 古市九兵衛理右衛門 appears. 九兵衛's ancestors, like 藤五郎, were retainers of the Asakura family (Takakage and Yoshikage): 古市與太郎左衛門善作 died in battle at the main gate of Ichijōdani, and 古市又七郎 was killed at 御幸塚 in Nomi District, Kaga Province. Their family crest, maru no uchi ni mitsu yahazu (three arrow nocks in a circle; 丸の内に三ツ矢筈), was granted by Takakage.

In present-day Fukui Prefecture, there have been settlements of families named Furuichi since before the Meiji period at Togano-chō (栂野町) and Shikununo-chō (宿布町) in Fukui (Ichijōdani Asakura Family Historic Ruins) and at Sakai-chō 折戸 in Sakai (near the Mukai family residence 木部新保館). Togano produced the educator Furuichi Risaburō, Furuichi Masakazu, and 古市幸吉, who ran the kimono shop Toganoya in Echizen Fuchū (Echizen). Their family temple is the Shōgo-ji.

== Furuichi clan of Himeji ==
=== Expansion of the Yamato Furuichi into Kawachi and Kii ===
The ancestor of the Himeji Furuichi was Furuichi Kageharu, who belonged to Matsunaga Hisahide, shugo of Yamato and lord of Furuichi Castle. In Tenshō 5, after the death of Matsunaga Hisahide, Kageharu's son 景末 moved to Kawachi and took up farming. 景末's son 景孝 (later 道生) studied medicine in Kyoto, took the art name 利庵, and moved to Kishū.

=== To Edo as a samurai-rank physician ===
In the 2nd month of Genna 3, 利庵's son Gensei was born in Kishū. Gensei deepened his learning and medicine in Nagasaki, and in the Kan'ei era he was taken into the service of Sakai Tadayo, lord of Kawagoe in Bushū. From fallen Yamato kokujin, the Furuichi thus became "samurai whose profession was medicine" (samurai-rank physicians, han'i), and came to revere Gensei as the "restorer of the family".

=== Establishment of the Himeji Furuichi ===
In Kan'en 2, in the time of Gensei's son Kōji and of 孝矩, when Sakai Tadazumi was transferred to Himeji, the Furuichi followed him and served in Edo as retainers of the Himeji Domain. The Furuichi house that moved to the Himeji Domain, while continuing to live permanently in Edo, held important posts such as oku-toshiyori and motojime-yaku (equivalent to kanjō bugyō), received several increases in stipend, and maintained and developed the family name.

=== Move to Himeji in the Bakumatsu and Restoration period ===
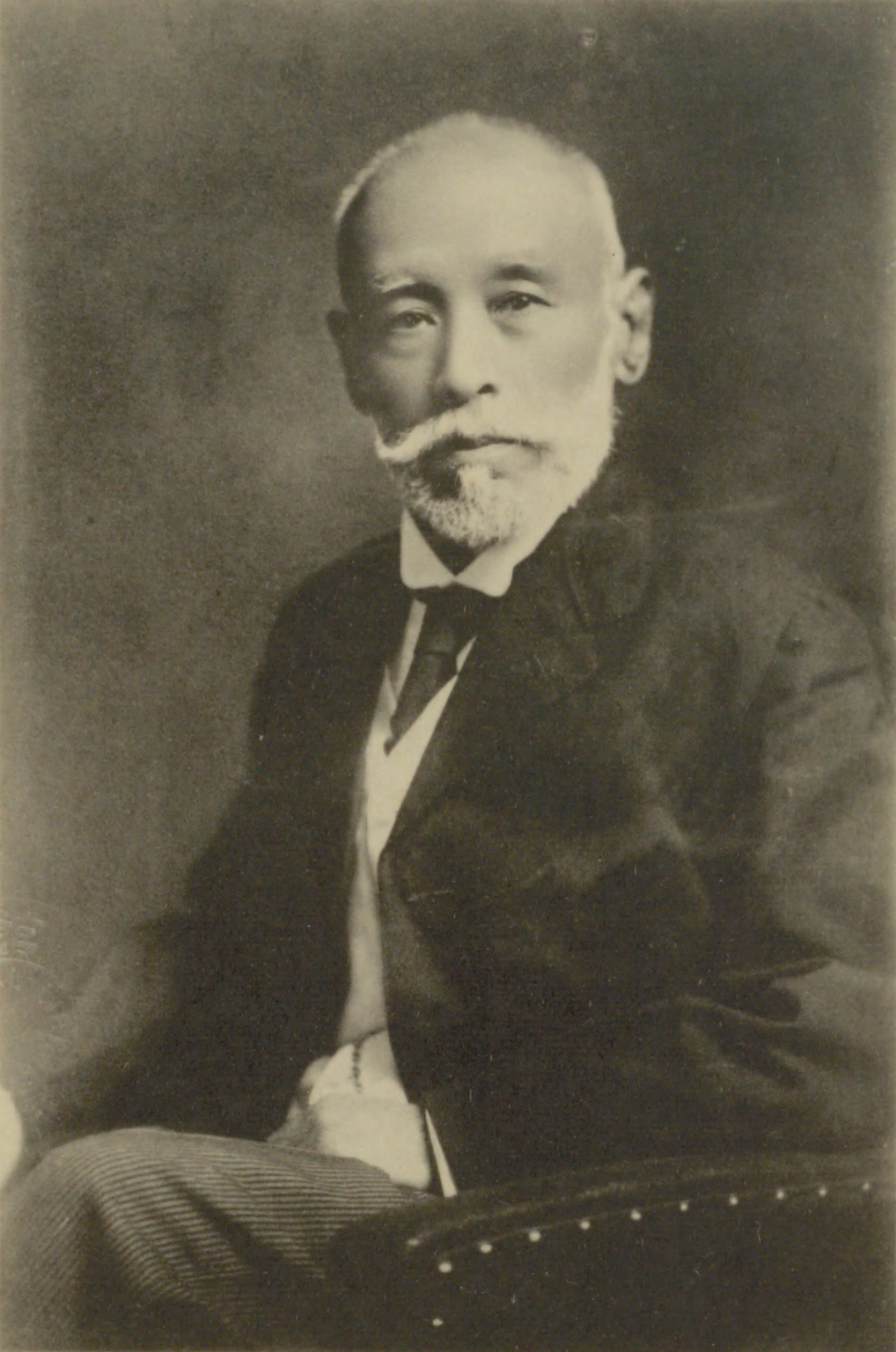
Furuichi Kōi

In Bunkyū 3, amid the turmoil of the Bakumatsu, the Himeji Domain announced a policy of recalling retainers stationed permanently in Edo (jōfu) to the castle town. The Furuichi family complied, left the Edo residence and moved within the enclosure of Himeji Castle. The head of the family, Furuichi 孝友, held high posts having served as sakite monogashira and motojime-yaku, and had established his position in the domain through increases in stipend.

From the Bakumatsu into the Meiji period, the heads of the family and their close relatives repeatedly lacked sons, and the family adopted heirs from other houses again and again. 孝友's nephew 堤鐵三 (later renamed 孝) was adopted into the Furuichi family in Tenpō 14. He excelled in letters and arms and valued integrity; he served as an omote koshō (page) and also as an organiser of Western-style drill, and at the age of 42, on the retirement of his adoptive father 孝友, he moved to Tokyo.

孝 had one son and one daughter: the son was Kōi and the daughter 洛子. Kōi was the first president of the College of Engineering of the Imperial University (the predecessor of the University of Tokyo Faculty of Engineering) and head of the Civil Engineering Bureau of the Home Ministry, and he has been called the highest authority in modern civil engineering.

== Furuichi clan of Kagoshima and Tanegashima ==
Entrance of the Furuichi family residence

The ancestors of the Furuichi of Kagoshima and Tanegashima were 古市舎人 of the Yamato Furuichi, who came to the island in the Sengoku period, and Furuichi Kai-no-kami and his son 古市長門守実清, of the Mogami family. 古市舎人 became a retainer of Tanegashima Tokitaka, and in 1562 (Eiroku 5), when Tokitaka's daughter Enshin'in-den left Tanegashima to become the second wife of her cousin Shimazu Yoshihisa, he accompanied her, settled at Kokubu (present-day Kirishima, Kagoshima Prefecture) and became a retainer of Yoshihisa. Furuichi Kai-no-kami and 古市長門守実清 came to the island in 1552 (Tenbun 21) on the orders of Shimazu Tadayoshi, and served as intermediaries with Konoe Taneie, 一式 Shikibu-no-taifu and others, petitioning for court rank for Shimazu Takahisa (大中公). Nagato-no-kami later changed his surname to Mogami and called himself Mogami 宗檜.

On Tanegashima, the Furuichi Family Residence of the main Tanegashima Furuichi line is preserved as an Important Cultural Property of Japan.

Furuichi Shizuko, who in 1886 founded the Komagome Kindergarten (now Usagi Kindergarten), the first kindergarten in Japan, was also from Tanegashima.
