= Furuichi In'ei =

Japanese warrior monk (1439–1505)

- 古市 胤栄

Personal details
- Born: 1439 (Eikyō 11)
- Died: 8 December 1505 (Eishō 2, 11th month, 13th day)
- Spouse: Daughter of the Kubojō clan
- Children: 覚胤; Wife of the Sagawa clan Wife of [[Takayama clan|琵琶小路]]
- Parent: Father: Furuichi Insen
- Relatives: In'ei (himself), Chōin (brother); Furuichi clan

Military service
- Allegiance: Shiba Yoshikado

Furuichi In'ei (古市 胤栄) was a Japanese Buddhist monk and warrior active from the middle of the Muromachi period into the Sengoku period. He was a shuto (armed monk-retainer) of Kōfuku-ji in Yamato Province. His father was Furuichi Insen, and his younger brother was Chōin.

== Life ==
=== Meeting with Kyōkaku and the deaths of his parents ===
He was born the son of Furuichi Insen, head (tōryō) of the kanpu shuto of the Daijō-in of Kōfuku-ji in Yamato Province.

On 3 March 1447 (Bun'an 4, 2nd month, 17th day), he met for the first time Kyōkaku, the abbot (monzeki) of Daijō-in, who had moved into the Geifuku-ji at Furuichi through his father Insen's arrangements.

On 14 August 1448 (Bun'an 5, 7th month, 15th day), his mother died. The hundredth-day memorial was held on the 26th day of the 10th month.

From 22 June to 7 July 1449 (Hōtoku 1, 6th month, 2nd–17th day), he suffered from a disorder of the stomach and became gravely ill. Kyōkaku wrote: "春藤丸 has a calm disposition, and when he grows up he will surely become a person above the ordinary. Lately he has become all the more attached to me, which makes this all the more pitiful. There is nothing to be done, and I am simply at a loss", and prayed for him again and again. Perhaps because the prayers were answered, 春藤丸 showed signs of recovery that dawn, and by the 17th he had fully recovered.

From 25 to 31 May 1450 (Hōtoku 2, 4th month, 14th–20th day), he made a pilgrimage to Ise Grand Shrine together with his grandmother, the nun 吉岡尼, and his younger sister. Before departing he received a woven-colour katabira (unlined robe) from Kyōkaku.

On 30 July 1453 (Kyōtoku 2, 6th month, 24th day), his father Insen died, and he became the head (sōryō) of the Furuichi house.

=== Appointment as head of the kanpu shuto ===
On 26 October 1455 (Kōshō 1, 9th month, 16th day), following the downfall of the Tsutsui clan, he was appointed head of the kanpu shuto, and Yamamura Inkei (山村胤慶), a member of the Furuichi family, became his deputy (daikan). Until his coming of age (genpuku), 春藤丸 devoted himself to temple administration, and other matters were handled by the Furuichi deputies (Yamamura Inkei and Nagata Ienori (長田家則)). Toyoda Raiei (豊田頼英), 小泉今力丸, Takayamaoku Raikō (鷹山奥頼弘) and 秋篠尾崎) were also appointed heads of the kanpu shuto.

On 27 June 1456 (Kōshō 2, 5th month, 25th day), the temple administration notified him that he would receive, as his first stipend, 13 koku of polished rice and 5 kanmon of gratuity money from the Furuichi and 田村 estates, shōen belonging to the Furuichi domain. By this time 春藤丸 appears already to have been taking part in practical work as a shuto. The following month, on 14 July (6th month, 12th day), an order was issued to Furuichi, Ochi and Koizumi to collect the contributions levied on the temples and shrines of Yamato for the repair of Daijō-in's buildings. These included Shōryaku-ji, Uchiyama Eikyū-ji, Hase-dera, Chōgaku-ji, Shigisan-ji, Byōdō-ji and Tachibana-dera.

On 14 February 1457 (Kōshō 3, 1st month, 20th day), Toyoda Raiei entrusted him with supervising the work on the earthen walls of the Zenjō-in. To prepare the groundwork, about thirty labourers a day were called up from the seven gō (villages) of the temple's domain, joined by two 横行法師. On the 19th he went to Hannya-ji with Kyōkaku and 今力丸.

On the 20th day of the 7th month of the same year, he married a daughter of the Kubojō clan.

In the 3rd month of 1459 (Chōroku 3), his grandmother the nun 吉岡尼 died, and in the 8th month of the following year his grandfather Inken died.

On 16 March 1460 (Chōroku 4, 2nd month, 23rd day), he met with Jōshin'in Kōsen and other members of the opposing Tsutsui faction. On 22 November (Chōroku 4, 10th month, 10th day), in a battle at Tatsuta in Yamato, 古市彦三郎, a member of the Furuichi family, and his sons the 彦左衛門 brothers were killed. Yamato was divided by the succession dispute (o-ie sōdō) in the Hatakeyama clan, and the kokujin (local landholders) were fighting in support of either Hatakeyama Yoshinari or Hatakeyama Masanaga; In'ei supported Yoshinari together with Ochi Iehide. 彦三郎 and his sons, on Yoshinari's side, attacked Masanaga's camp at Tatsuta (present-day Ikaruga, Ikoma District) but were defeated. Kyōkaku was told that this was because Tsutsui Jun'ei, in the rear of Masanaga's army, had attacked with about 500 men.

=== The dharma name "In'ei"; meeting the Shiba and Asakura ===
On 18 September 1465 (Kanshō 6, 8th month, 28th day), he took the tonsure and adopted the dharma name "In'ei". The ordination followed due form: his two preceptors, 宗芸 and 英照, supplied the robes and a full set of garments, and an offering of 300 hiki was made. Before the tonsure he offered a cup of sake in the room of 尊藤, and afterwards he was granted a bundle of sugihara paper and a roll of white cloth.

On the 21st day of the 10th month, a dispute arose between the deputies of Hatakeyama Yoshinari and Hatakeyama Masanaga over the Kawachi Jūnanakasho, land directly controlled by the shogunate. By arrangement with Yoshinari, In'ei led troops into Kawachi Province. He was accompanied by the Kataoka, Handa, Tatsuta, Yamada, 萩, Kubojō and 番条, with two to three hundred armoured men in all. That same day they entered the 仁和寺 in Kawachi, and the enemy set up camp about 1 km away. On the 26th the first battle was fought; they attacked the area and burned it, and returned to camp on the 29th.

On 13 May 1466 (Bunshō 1, 3rd month, 29th day), through the mediation of Asakura Takakage, he met Shiba Yoshikado for the first time. On the 29th day of the 5th month, Yoshikado granted him lands in Owari and Echizen, and the two appear to have entered a lord–vassal relationship. As the conflict between Shiba Yoshikado and Yoshitoshi intensified and troops began to gather from the provinces, on the 8th day of the 8th month he sent about ten armoured men and ten archers to the capital on Yoshikado's side, under 萩 as commander. For this service he received an additional 800 kanmon of land in Echizen.

On 14 February 1467 (Bunshō 2, 1st month, 10th day), when Shiba Yoshikado was appointed kanrei, In'ei sent the son of 与三 and Kusuba Mototsugu to the capital to congratulate him. On this occasion Yoshikado granted him an additional 700 kanmon of land.

Where these Echizen lands lay is known from a later record. On the 20th day of the 5th month of Ōnin 2 (1468), when Kyōkaku sent a messenger down to the lower part of 細呂宜郷 in the Kawaguchi Estate, he noted the purpose of the errand as "this concerns Furuichi's domain" (是古市領地事也). The editors of the Kyōgaku Shiyōshō identify this "Furuichi" as In'ei.

=== Ōnin War: the outbreak ===
On 25 February 1467 (Bunshō 2, 1st month, 21st day), In'ei received a summons from Asakura Takakage to come up to the capital, and set out early in the morning with his forces on the side of Shiba Yoshikado. He gathered his kinsmen and young retainers (wakatō), and before setting out they exchanged farewell cups of sake. In'ei wore silk kobakama and rode in a wooden palanquin, but the road was so bad that they stopped once. When they set out again In'ei too mounted a horse, keeping four or five men beside him. 楠葉新右衛門 also rode, and more than thirty horsemen, kinsmen and young retainers together, followed them. The Furuichi force crossed Takayama and passed through Yamada on its way to the capital. Ahead of them were about seventy armoured men, and they expected to reach Kyoto within the day.

In the afternoon, however, word came from Kyoto that "there is no need to come up to the capital". On the 18th the Battle of Kamigoryō Shrine had taken place: Hosokawa Katsumoto and Kyōgoku Mochikiyo, on Hatakeyama Masanaga's side, together with Hosokawa Shigeyuki and Akamatsu Masanori, had turned against him, abandoned Masanaga and gone over to the shogun's side. Meanwhile Hatakeyama Yoshinari had taken the field himself and battle was joined; on Yoshinari's side 隅田 and 隅屋 were killed, and on Masanaga's side 遊佐八郎左衛門 and the Jinbō brothers were killed. Further, Yamana Sōzen joined hands with Yoshinari and attached the Bingo men to 垣屋孫右衛門, and Asakura Takakage also took the field on Yoshinari's side. When Masanaga fled late at night they pursued him, and the Asakura force too took heads. With the enemy gone, the march to the capital became unnecessary, and In'ei turned back at 相楽 and returned home.

On 2 March (1st month, 26th day), In'ei did go up to the capital and that same night had an audience with the kanrei Shiba Yoshikado. A banquet was held the next day, and he received the supreme honour of dining in the kanrei's presence. Those present included 小笠原民部小輔, 武田大輔入道, 朝倉孫二郎, 甲斐修理亮 and 甲斐八郎衛門, and there was music (ongyoku) and dance (mai). He went back down on 8 March (2nd month, 3rd day).

With the Battle of Kamigyō at the end of the 5th month, the Ōnin War broke out in Kyoto. At this time In'ei was being urged by Shiba Yoshikado and Asakura Takakage to come up to the capital. Ochi Iehide's army had already gone up with 100 men, but the monks of Kōfuku-ji, beginning with Jinson, were opposed to Furuichi going to the capital, fearing that he would become an enemy of the court (chōteki), and spent several days trying to dissuade In'ei. In'ei had set out for the capital on the 8th, but he gathered his kinsmen and debated whether to go. On the 12th an urgent order to come up came from Asakura as well, but finally, on the 14th, the monks 宗藝 and 慶英 pressed In'ei and persuaded him to stay. (Note: Concerning In'ei's journey to the capital, the Dai Nihon Shiryō, part 8, vol. 1, states 「是日、胤栄入京ス、入京の日詳かならず、姑く是日に掲ぐ」 ("On this day In'ei entered the capital; the day of his entry is not certain, so it is provisionally placed under this day"), but this is an error. It arose from misreading the position of a punctuation mark in the primary source, so that the text was read as "Furuichi has gone up to the capital" (古市上洛了). In fact, In'ei was restrained by Jinson and the other monks of Kōfuku-ji and remained in Nara.) On the evening of the following day, the 15th, Kusuba Mototsugu's son informed Kyōkaku that on the previous day Asakura Takakage had fought the enemy Takeda Nobukata at Nijō in Kyoto and inflicted heavy damage on the Takeda force. In'ei, who was at a drinking party, was overjoyed at the news of victory and ordered that it be reported at once to Furuichi Castle.

On the 12th day of the 9th month, Kusuba Mototsugu brought back news of the situation in the capital and reported that pressure and instructions for In'ei to come up to the capital had arrived from Yamana Sōzen and Asakura Takakage. In'ei decided to go to the capital in response to Asakura's request. On the 25th an advance party went up, consisting of fifteen armoured men under the command of 萩左京亮, together with kinsmen, young retainers and Kusuba Mototsugu's son. On the 27th they encamped at the 法然房寺 at Kurodani (present-day Konkaikōmyō-ji, Kurodani-chō, Sakyō-ku, Kyoto), near where the Asakura force was deployed. The enemy Akamatsu force was encamped near Nanzen-ji, so the two camps faced each other.

On the 3rd day of the 10th month, the Battle of Shōkoku-ji took place; the Furuichi force fought alongside Hatakeyama Yoshinari and Asakura Takakage of the Western Army and won. Shōkoku-ji, where Takeda Nobukata had been encamped, was burned to the ground, and Furuichi set up camp on its site together with the Asakura force.

=== Ōnin War: fighting in Yamato ===
On 10 June 1468 (Ōnin 2, 5th month, 20th day), he tried to send a messenger concerning his lands in Echizen, but at that time Yoshitoshi, Shiba Yoshikado's rival, had made a comeback in Echizen and driven the Asakura out of the province, and the situation there was unsettled.

On 28 October 1470 (Bunmei 2, 10th month, 5th day), In'ei sent troops under Nagata Ienori to Shimokoma (present-day Seika, Sōraku District, Kyoto Prefecture) to reinforce the army led by Ōuchi Masahiro. They fought against Tsutsui Jun'ei and others, who had their base at Kizu.

On 12 February 1471 (Bunmei 3, 1st month, 23rd day), amid armed clashes throughout the Nanto area, In'ei's allies, who sided with the Kōriyama faction, attacked Yakushi-ji and burned its new quarters.

On 19 September 1473 (Bunmei 5, 8th month, 27th day), Kyōkaku died. The cause of death is said to have been a severe stroke (daichūbu) that struck him a few days earlier. When Kyōkaku collapsed, In'ei and Jinson consulted about the funeral. In'ei joined the procession wearing a kogoromo, and many members of the Furuichi family also took part.

On 28 August 1474 (Bunmei 6, 7th month, 16th day), he sent a small detachment towards Kyoto, and the next day he received word from Ōuchi Masahiro that a battle was expected in Kyoto.

On 17 June 1475 (Bunmei 7, 5th month, 14th day), he encamped at Shin-Yakushi-ji with his brother Chōin, who was in his first battle, and Ochi Iehide, and fought Tōchi Tōkiyo, Hashio Tamekuni, Jōshin'in Junsei and others of the Eastern Army at the great torii of Kasuga-taisha. On the Furuichi side four kinsmen and thirteen young retainers were killed, and In'ei and Chōin barely "survived" (継命). Jinson, the abbot of Daijō-in, wrote that a battle at the great torii was an unheard-of outrage and that divine punishment had fallen (Daijōin Jisha Zōjiki, vol. 69, entry for Bunmei 7, 5th month, 14th day).

Taking the defeat at the Kasuga shrine as the occasion, he handed over the headship of the house to his brother Chōin on 20 August (7th month, 19th day). This is also said to have been meant to deflect criticism of In'ei's forceful control over his household. He did not appear in public for some time after the defeat, but on 12 November (10th month, 14th day) he visited Jinson of Daijō-in with his brother Chōin and attended upon the abbot's procession. After this In'ei was called 古市西 ("Furuichi of the West").

=== Ōnin War: the fighting in Kawachi ===
On 15 October 1477 (Bunmei 9, 9th month, 9th day), Hatakeyama Yoshinari, aiming to recover Kawachi Province, consulted Chōin and Ochi Iehide, both of his faction, about a plan to take the field; a few days later Chōin's men escorted Yoshinari's wife and Hatakeyama Yoshitoyo and delivered them to the Ochi. On 27 October (9th month, 21st day), Yoshinari left Kyoto with 350 horsemen and 2,000 armoured men and advanced from Yamashiro into Kawachi. On 2 November (9th month, 27th day) the Battle of Wakae Castle began; the Furuichi brothers (In'ei and Chōin) also took the field, and the kokujin forces of Yamato all set out at once, including not only Yoshinari's faction under Ochi but also Masanaga's faction, such as the Tsutsui and Hashio Tamekuni.

The Ochi and Furuichi forces advanced north-west from Yamato Takada, joined Yoshinari, who was encamped at Fujii-dera, and won the battle of Konda Castle on 12 November (10th month, 7th day). On 14 November (10th month, 9th day) the Ochi and Furuichi forces defended Kyōkō-ji in Kawachi and drove off Tsutsui Junson, who was marching to relieve Wakae Castle.

On 18 November (10th month, 13th day), in Yamato, Sugi Hirosuke, a commander on Ōuchi Masahiro's side at Shimokoma Castle, led 300 armoured men and several thousand foot soldiers and took Kizu Castle. The Nitsuki of Iga, who had taken the field at Kizu, and then 成身院順宣 and Tsutsui Junson burned their own positions and fled. Sugi, keeping his troops with him, marched from Kizu to Hannya-ji in the northern part of Nanto. Sugi's aim seems to have been to sweep away the Eastern Army forces, together with the Furuichi force that had been fighting for the Ōuchi since 1470 (Bunmei 2) and was stationed at 下狛大北城, and so help Yoshinari's faction enter Yamato. The previous year, too, 北山, a Furuichi deputy, had reported a planned march on Nanto to Jinson.

Fearing an attack on Nanto, the gakuryo and rokuhō of Kōfuku-ji informed the Furuichi force; Nakamikado and others met Sugi, and 井上九郎, the Furuichi deputy, was sent to Shimokoma Castle, so the matter was settled without incident. The brothers In'ei and Chōin also hurried back from Kawachi to Nanto that same night, deployed with 100 armoured men at the 天満社 on Saihōinzan to keep order, and the next day instructed their retainer Nagata Ienori to guard 己心寺 and Hokke-ji.

On 16 December (11th month, 11th day), Ōuchi Masahiro, Toki Shigeyori and Hatakeyama Yoshinari each returned to their home provinces, and the Ōnin War, which had lasted eleven years, came to an end. Sugi burned Shimokoma Castle himself and went home, and 井上九郎 and the other Furuichi deputies who had been holding 下狛大北城 withdrew to Furuichi Castle.

=== Later years ===
On 18 November 1477 (Bunmei 9, 10th month, 13th day), though retired, he hurried from Kyōkō-ji in Kawachi Province to Nara with his brother Chōin and took up position there with more than a hundred armoured men. Three days later, however, on 21 November (10th month, 16th day), word reached Jinson that In'ei was going to retire once again. Envoys were also sent by the Hatakeyama clan to smooth matters over, and In'ei appears to have given up the idea of retiring, but Asakura Hiroshi states that the circumstances are unclear.

On 25 January 1478 (Bunmei 9, 12th month, 22nd day), his daughter married into the Sagawa clan, who were on the Tsutsui side. Because the other party belonged to the Tsutsui faction the match was regarded as a problem, and that night dispossessed men of the Sagawa even made a move to converge on them.

On 17 February (Bunmei 10, 1st month, 15th day), when his brother Chōin was appointed to the kanpu shuto, In'ei also joined in recommending him.

On 22 May 1480 (Bunmei 12, 4th month, 13th day), although already retired, he was still making preparations to find a place of seclusion at Mount Kōya, 明山 or 田辺. This seems not to have been realised.

The Daijōin Jisha Zōjiki entry for 22 October 1481 (Bunmei 13, 9th month, 29th day), titled 「衆徒国民内縁等知音事」 ("On the kinship and acquaintance of the shuto and kokumin"), states that "倶尸羅 and the Furuichi brothers are distant relatives" (倶尸羅と古市兄弟とは遠縁者なり), and Asakura Hiroshi identifies these "Furuichi brothers" as In'ei and Chōin.

On the 25th day of the 4th month of Bunmei 16 (1484), concerning In'ei's request to retire to the area around 山中, which had been under discussion since the previous year, the abbot admonished him, and on this day it was answered that the matter would be postponed. The editors of the Seikaku Daisōjō ki annotate this entry "古市西 In'ei: retirement postponed at Jinson's urging" (古市西胤栄 尋尊の慰留により隠居を延引), and the entry for the following day records that Chōin thanked Jinson.

In the 10th month of 1490 (Entoku 2), when Chōin, as a kanpu shuto, proclaimed a debt-cancellation decree (tokusei), unexpected consequences followed: the household retainers (uchishū) who had carried it out fled to Mount Kōya, and In'ei had to go into hiding within the mountain.

On 14 January 1491 (Entoku 2, 12th month, 5th day), he withdrew from the world as a recluse monk (tonsei).

On 14 May 1492 (Entoku 4, 4th month, 18th day), his adopted son (yūshi) 覚胤 died.

He died on 8 December 1505 (Eishō 2, 11th month, 13th day), aged 67. In that year a peace was concluded among the kokujin of Yamato and a petition was offered before the Kasuga shrine, but the name of the Furuichi clan does not appear in it.

== Records of judicial cases ==
Kyōkaku's Kyōgaku Shiyōshō and Jinson's Daijōin Jisha Zōjiki preserve records of the kendan (police and judicial) cases handled by In'ei.

On 27 August 1457 (Kōshō 3, 8th month, 9th day), concerning irrigation water from the 能登川 and 岩井川 rivers, tributaries of the Yamato River, water that should have been delivered to the Kodono estate was being diverted by two parties, the 鹿野苑 side and the 見塔院 side, on the pretext of an emergency. 春藤丸 held a trial and heard both sides' explanations, but their reasons were unclear; on the basis of past rulings and precedent he decided that the water should go "to the Kodono estate as before" and ordered it switched back immediately. From around this time the foundations of his control over the Furuichi retainers were laid.

On 20 December 1461 (Kanshō 2, 11th month, 19th day), in a suit in which 甲岡 of the monastery sought to seize the 大野荘 in Uda District, a holding of the 東門院, 春藤丸 ruled that resorting to force was not permissible for any reason whatsoever. The 甲岡 side had sought to take over the estate on the basis of an old loan document stating that in Ōei 2 the late sōjō 円尋 had borrowed 2,000 hiki from the 大野荘's annual tax, but the debt had been cancelled by the general debt-cancellation (tokusei) of Shōchō 1, and the council of the rokuhō-shū had already ruled on the matter.

In the 6th month of 1466 (Bunshō 1), a monk of the 見塔院 in Yamato attacked a monk and servants of the 四恩院 by night. It was decided to establish the truth by Yugishō (ordeal by boiling water), but the situation became confused, with the son of 弁公 of the 見塔院 running away. In'ei and Tsutsui Jun'ei mediated, achieving a reconciliation and the withdrawal of both sides' forces.

On 23 August (7th month, 13th day), he banished Yamamura Inkei, a member of the Furuichi family. Hashiin, which had belonged to the Tsubao clan, had become a retainer of the 東北院, and a dispute over the retainer arose between the Tsubao and the 東北院. The cause was that the 東北院 side sought help from In'ei and the Hashiin side from Yamamura Inkei, and the two men fell out. Inkei was pardoned half a year later. Further, in 1470 (Bunmei 2), In'ei executed two retainers who had caused a disturbance and banished thirty people, including kinsmen. Among those punished were members of houses such as the Yamamura, who within Kōfuku-ji were of equal standing with the Furuichi and could become kanpu shuto, yet Kōfuku-ji, as the public authority, was unable to object. (Note: Regarding these punishments, it has also been suggested that in Yamamura Inkei's case In'ei resented Inkei, who had probably held real power in the Furuichi clan, and that the banishment of the kinsmen and others likewise did not reflect any intention to control his retainers but resulted from a fit of temper on In'ei's part.)

On 17 August 1473 (Bunmei 5, 7th month, 23rd day), there was an incident in which the scholar-monks and rokuhō objected to the appointment, through a scheme of the Tsutsui clan, of Tōnomine as deputy of 萩原 on the Ise road (present-day Haibara 萩原, Uda). To settle it, In'ei met with the Tsutsui and worked to mediate. However, the affair was still unresolved a year later; the "thirteen men" of the scholar-monks and rokuhō who opposed the deputy fled, and repeatedly set fires throughout Nara and seized annual taxes and tansen and tanmai levies. His younger brother Chōin, who had not been involved in the affair at first, also fled and was punished in the same way as the thirteen. This led Chōin, who had been a scholar-monk, to go to the battlefield, and after this incident Chōin never returned to being a scholar-monk.

== Culture and fūryū ==
Cultural pursuits and fūryū (refined entertainments) had been cultivated at Furuichi Castle since the time of his father Insen and grandfather Inken, and In'ei too was a man of taste. He is known for holding rinkan chanoyu, gatherings combining bathing and tea, and together with Chōin he became a disciple of Murata Jukō, the founder of the tea ceremony. Because a descendant of the Furuichi clan served in the Edo period as head of tea (sadōgashira) to the main Ogasawara house (lords of the Kokura Domain), he is named as the founder of the Ogasawara-ke Sadō Koryū.

For three days from 25 August 1447 (Bun'an 4, 7th month, 14th day), Urabon furyū dances and sarugaku performances were held at Furuichi Castle and 鹿野園. The programme on the second day was "Sasaki on horseback" (a furyū on Sasaki Takatsuna's race to be first across the Uji River), and on the evening of the third day a furyū and sarugaku of "Ama-no-Iwato" was performed. The roles were taken by temple monks and young boys: Tajikarao-myōjin was played by the monk 善明, Amaterasu by the son of 三郎衛門, and the heavenly maiden by the monk 延浄. On this occasion nine-year-old 小法師丸 (later In'ei) also served as a hayashi musician.

At the Urabon of 23 August 1450 (Hōtoku 2, 7th month, 16th day), furyū was again held at Furuichi Castle, organised by 古市小法師丸. Besides items such as "tug-of-war" and 「雪マロハカシ」 (yuki-marohakashi), there were stalls and performances by vendors, and the event is said to have closed with a kasa (umbrella) dance.

On 11 February 1458 (Chōroku 2, 1st month, 27th day), he took part in a thousand-verse renga session held by Kyōkaku.

In 1469 (Bunmei 1), when the bath cauldron broke, to raise money for its repair he built a hut where furyū dances, then banned in Nara, could be danced, and charged an entrance fee of 6 mon. The hut was a great success, drawing as many as 3,000 people. Yasuda Tsuguo has called it "Japan's first paid dance hall".

On 22 February 1472 (Bunmei 4, 1st month, 14th day), a renga gathering was held at the 藤原道場, and In'ei composed the opening verse: 「あつさ弓春は八千代の初りな」 (Azusa-yumi / haru wa yachiyo no / hajimari na, "Catalpa bow — spring is the beginning of eight thousand ages").

On 11 August 1473 (Bunmei 5, 7th month, 17th day), when the turmoil of the Ōnin War had begun to settle, the Urabon furyū was held at Daijō-in. In'ei himself performed in the guise of Daikokuten, one of the Seven Lucky Gods. The audience included Ichijō Kaneyoshi and other nobles who had taken refuge from Kyoto, as well as Jinson and other members of the Daijō-in. Soldiers lined the gate, and the young men of the upper and lower hokumen, together with 吉田道祐 and the satashū 中坊懐尊 and others, were in attendance. During the night the blinds were rolled up along the nine-bay front of the hall before the abbot, and fifteen lanterns were hung. On the eastern corridor side, too, the sliding screens were raised and lowered and the blinds let down, and the ladies-in-waiting took their seats inside the blinds. The bōkan and samurai lined up along the screens and the veranda respectively, and the hokumen members and elders took their places on the southern veranda of the nine-bay hall. The page boys and children stood in a single line from around the double doors along the whole length of the nine-bay veranda. Jinson wrote that the performance was so splendid that its highlights could not be confined to just one.

== See also ==
- Bunshō Incident
