= 1467 =

1467 in various calendars
- Gregorian calendar: 1467; MCDLXVII
- Ab urbe condita: 2220
- Armenian calendar: 916; ԹՎ ՋԺԶ
- Assyrian calendar: 6217
- Balinese saka calendar: 1388–1389
- Bengali calendar: 873–874
- Berber calendar: 2417
- English Regnal year: 6 Edw. 4 – 7 Edw. 4
- Buddhist calendar: 2011
- Burmese calendar: 829
- Byzantine calendar: 6975–6976
- Chinese calendar: 丙戌年 (Fire Dog); 4164 or 3957 — to — 丁亥年 (Fire Pig); 4165 or 3958
- Coptic calendar: 1183–1184
- Discordian calendar: 2633
- Ethiopian calendar: 1459–1460
- Hebrew calendar: 5227–5228
- Hindu calendars
- Vikram Samvat: 1523–1524
- Shaka Samvat: 1388–1389
- Kali Yuga: 4567–4568
- Holocene calendar: 11467
- Igbo calendar: 467–468
- Iranian calendar: 845–846
- Islamic calendar: 871–872
- Japanese calendar: Bunshō 2 / Ōnin 1 (応仁元年)
- Javanese calendar: 1383–1384
- Julian calendar: 1467; MCDLXVII
- Korean calendar: 3800
- Minguo calendar: 445 before ROC 民前445年
- Nanakshahi calendar: −1
- Thai solar calendar: 2009–2010
- Tibetan calendar: མེ་ཕོ་ཁྱི་ལོ་ (male Fire-Dog); 1593 or 1212 or 440 — to — མེ་མོ་ཕག་ལོ་ (female Fire-Boar); 1594 or 1213 or 441

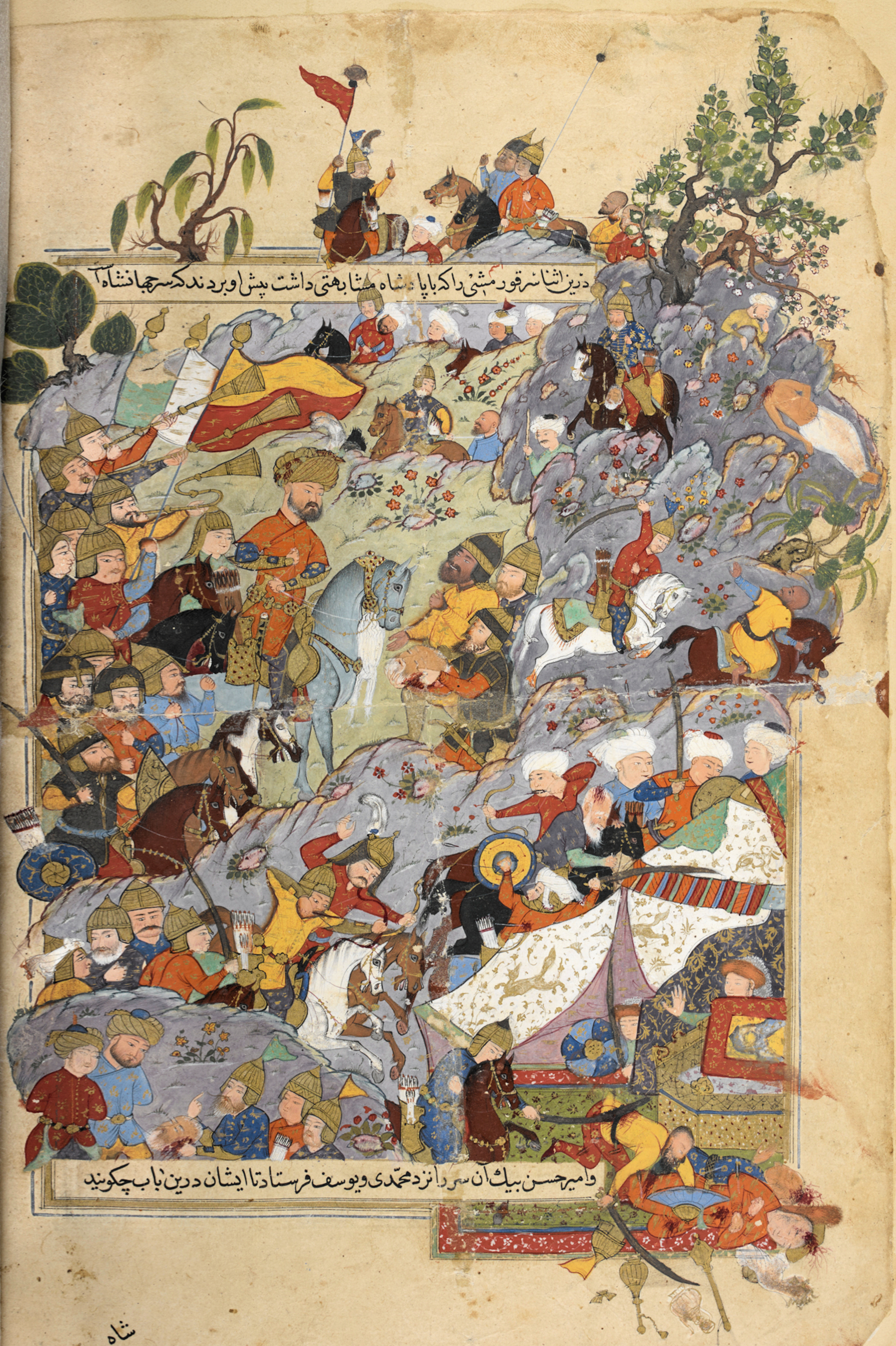
November 11: Iranian Emperor Jahan Shah decapitated at the Battle of Chapakchur

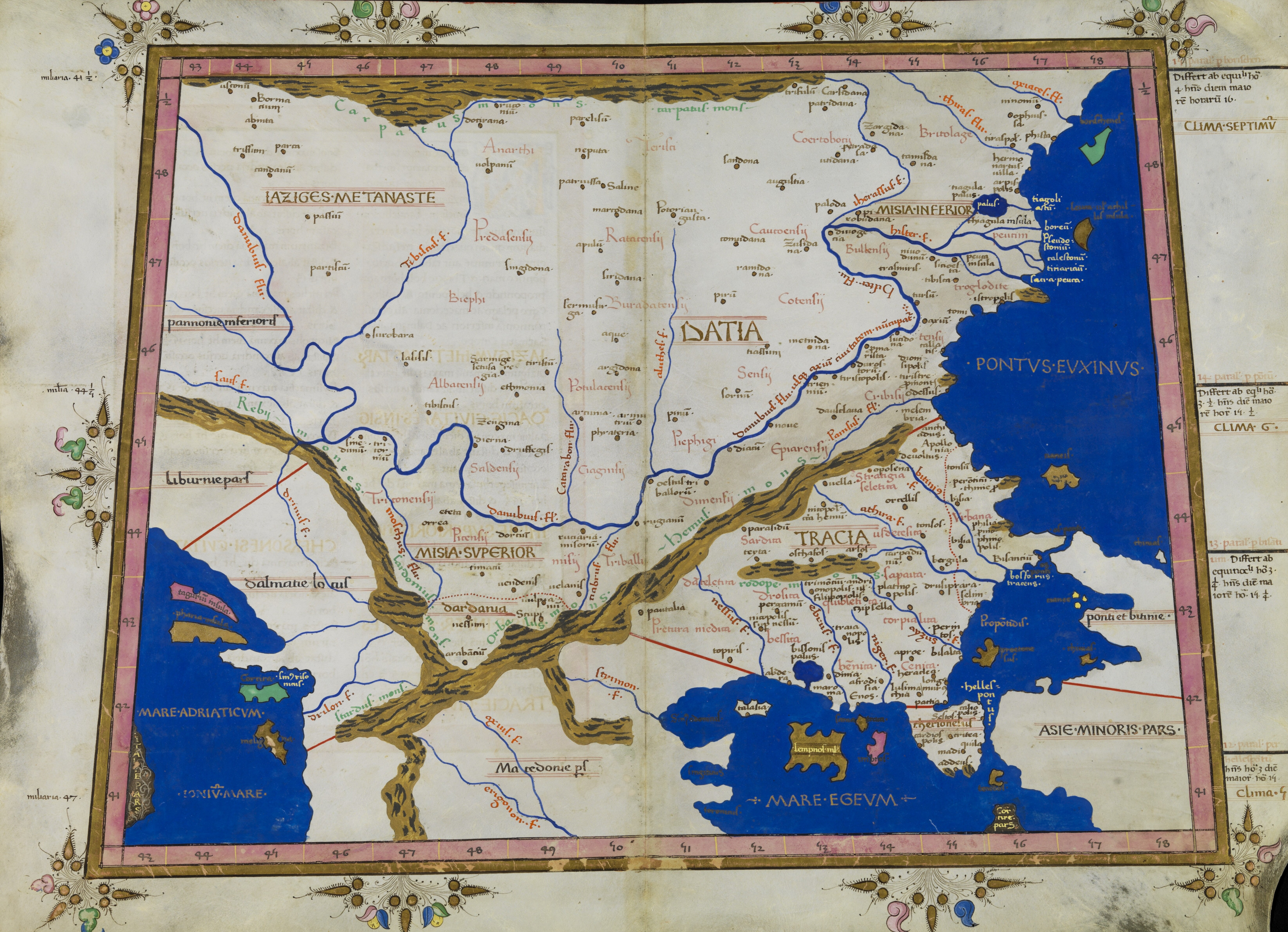
Map of Dacia from a 1467 book (currently at the National Library of Poland) made after Ptolemy's Geographia (c. AD 140).

Year 1467 (MCDLXVII) was a common year starting on Thursday of the Julian calendar.

== Events ==
=== January–March ===
- January 7 – At Rome, Pope Paul II holds a secret papal consistory, with the Albanian general Skanderbeg, to ask the cardinals assembled to provide Skanderbeg with 5,000 ducats (equivalent to 17.5 kilograms (39 lb) of gold based on the worth of a ducat of 3.5g of gold). While the cardinals respond that 5,000 ducats is insufficient, the Pope explains that the additional money will have to wait until the war in Italy is concluded.
- January 15 – In one of his first acts as the new Patriarch of the Eastern Orthodox Church, Dionysius I removes George Galesiotes and Manuel Christonymos from office in the Church as an act of revenge against their failure to support his candidacy.
- February 14 – Still unable to receive more than 7,500 ducats, General Skanderbeg departs from Rome with no plans for future aid to the Papal States, and receives word that he is needed back in Albania to defend the kingdom against the Ottoman invasion.
- February 23 – (19th day of 1st month of Bunshō 2) The Ōnin War begins with the Battle of Goryo, also called the "Battle of the Spirits", ends after two days near Kyoto initially as a battle between to factions in the Hatakeyama clan. Hatakeyama Yoshinari defeats Hatakeyama Masanaga for control of the Kami-Goryo Shrine. The Onin War will continue for more than 10 years until ending on 25 December 1477.
- March 29 – On Easter Sunday, in the Bohemian city of Kunvald (now part of the Czech Republic), the Unity of the Brethren (commonly called the Moravian Church) is formed as one of the first Protestant churches by four Hussite bishops. Despite persecution, it progresses to as many as 100,000 adherents within 100 years.

=== April–June ===
- April 23 – The Albanian League of Lezhë, aided by troops from the Republic of Venice, is successful in ending the Ottoman siege of the fortress at Krujë after 10 months.
- May 8 – Henry IV, Duke of Mecklenburg and Frederick III, Elector of Saxony, send a warning to the various dukes of Pomerania to abide by the 1466 Treaty of Soldin, or face an economic boycott by both nations. The Duchy of Pomerania-Stettin refuses to swear allegiance to Brandenburg, which begins a war with Stettin a year later.
- June 15 – Philip the Good is succeeded as Duke of Burgundy, by Charles the Bold.
- June 27 – (26th day of 5th month of Ōnin 1) In Japan, the Battle of Kamigyo begins in Kyoto as the "Eastern Army" of Takeda Nobutaka and Jōshin'in Mitsunobu (the aide to Hatakeyama Masanaga, who lost the Battle of Goryo) invade temples on both sides of the Ogawa River with 160,000 troops, and seize control of Kyoto in an attempt to capture its military governor, Isshiki Yoshinao.

=== July–September ===
- July 25 – In one of the largest battles of the 15th century in Italy, the Battle of Molinella is fought along the Idice River near Bologna by the army of the Republic of Venice against the armies of the Republic of Florence and the Duchy of Milan. The battle marks the first extensive use of artillery and firearms in combat in Italy, and while relatively few of the 27,000 troops from both sides sustain casualties (500 dead, 1,000 wounded) the battle is notable for the killing of almost 1,000 horses. Although both sides withdraw, the Venetian General Bartolomeo Colleoni abandons further attempts to conquer Milan.
- August 20 – As the War of the Castilian Succession continues, an attempt by Alfonso, Prince of Asturias to defeat his half-brother, King Enrique IV of Castile, in the Second Battle of Olmedo.
- September 11 – Sejo, Emperor of Korea (in the Joseon dynasty) receives the imperial edict from China's Xianzong of Ming, directing the Koreans to join Chinese forces in subjugating the Jurchen state in Manchuria. Sejo orders the mobilization of 10,000 Korean troops but instructs the Joseon commander to keep the Korean troops independent from the Chinese force, to wait until the Chinese attack before assisting with Korean troops, and to avoid confrontation with the Jurchen cavalry unless it appears that the Chinese army is winning.

=== October–December ===
- October 9 – (10 Jumada I 872 AH) Sayf al-Din Bilbay becomes the new Sultan of Egypt and Syria upon the death of the Sultan Sayf al-Din Khushqadam, who had reigned since 1461.
- October 17 –
  - King James III of Scotland gives royal assent to numerous laws passed by the Scottish Parliament in its six day session at Edinburgh, including the Ferries Act requiring the ramps of ferry boats be improved to support the weight of horses being shipped ("That briggis of buirdis be maide at ferryis for the eis of schipping of hors") and three acts relating to coins and currency.
  - Choe Hang is appointed as the news prime minister (yonguijong) of Korea by the Emperor Sejo, succeeding Sim Hoe.
- October 29 – At the Battle of Brustem, Charles the Bold defeats the Prince-Bishopric of Liège.
- November 11 – At the Battle of Chapakchur, in what is now the Bingöl Province of Turkey, the tribal confederation of Aq Qoyunlu, with 12,000 cavalry and infantry led by Uzun Hasan, makes a surprise attack against 6,000 troops of the Qara Qoyunlu nation, commanded by the Sultan Jahan Shah. The Sultan is decapitated in the battle while trying to flee.
- November 12 – Regent of Sweden Erik Axelsson Tott supports the re-election of deposed Charles VIII of Sweden to the throne.
- December 5 – Sayf al-Din Bilbay, Sultan of Egypt and Syria, is overthrown less than two months after becoming the monarch, as the Dhahiri branch of the Mamluks captures him. The Dhahiris proclaim Al-Malik al-Zahir Timurbugha al-Rumi (referred to as "Timurbugha") as the new Sultan.
- December 15 – At the Battle of Baia, troops under Stephen III of Moldavia decisively defeat the forces of Matthias Corvinus, King of Hungary, at Baia (present-day Romania). This is the last Hungarian attempt to subdue the Principality of Moldavia.

=== Date unknown ===
- Third Siege of Krujë: A few months after the failure of the second siege, Mehmed II leads another unsuccessful Ottoman invasion of Albania.
- While Hassan III of the Maldives is on Hajj, Sayyidh Muhammad deposes his son, acting regent. On his return, Hassan regains the throne.
- Some papal abbreviators are arrested and tortured on the orders of Pope Paul II, among them Filippo Buonaccorsi.
- King Matthias Corvinus founds the first university in Slovakia, the Universitas Istropolitana in Bratislava.
- The first European polyalphabetic cipher is invented by Leon Battista Alberti (approximate date).
- Juan de Torquemada's book, Meditationes, seu Contemplationes devotissimae, is published.

== Births ==
- January – John Colet, English churchman and educational pioneer (d. 1519)
- January 1
  - Philip of Cleves, Bishop of Nevers, Amiens, Autun (d. 1505)
  - Sigismund I the Old, King of Poland and Grand Duke of Lithuania (d. 1548)
- January 4
  - Henry the Younger of Stolberg, Stadtholder of Friesland (1506–1508) (d. 1508)
  - Bodo VIII, Count of Stolberg-Wernigerode (1511–1538) (d. 1538)
- January 26 – Guillaume Budé, French scholar (d. 1540)
- February 2 – Columba of Rieti, Italian Dominican tertiary Religious Sister (d. 1501)
- March 19 – Bartolomeo della Rocca, Italian scholar (d. 1504)
- March 21 – Caritas Pirckheimer, German nun (d. 1532)
- May 8 – Adalbert of Saxony, Administrator of Mainz (1482–1484) (d. 1484)
- May 31 – Sibylle of Brandenburg, Duchess of Jülich and Berg (d. 1524)
- August 11 – Mary of York, daughter of King Edward IV of England (d. 1482)
- August 25 – Francisco Fernández de la Cueva, 2nd Duke of Alburquerque, Spanish duke (d. 1526)
- October 21 – Giovanni il Popolano, Italian diplomat (d. 1498)
- November 9
  - Charles II, Duke of Guelders, Count of Zutphen from 1492 (d. 1538)
  - Philippa of Guelders, twin sister of Charles, Duke of Guelders, Duchess consort of Lorraine (d. 1547)
- November 25 – Thomas Dacre, 2nd Baron Dacre, Knight of Henry VIII of England (d. 1525)
- date unknown
  - John Bourchier, 2nd Baron Berners, English translator (d. 1553)
  - Krzysztof Szydłowiecki, Polish nobleman (d. 1532)
  - John Yonge, English ecclesiastic and diplomatist (d. 1516)
- probable – William Latimer, English churchman and scholar (d. 1545)

== Deaths ==
- March 13 – Vettore Cappello, Venetian statesman
- March 29 – Matthew Palaiologos Asen, Byzantine aristocrat and official
- April 20 – Dorotea Gonzaga, Italian noble (b. 1449)
- April 30 – John, Count of Angoulême (b. 1399)
- June 15 – Philip III, Duke of Burgundy (b. 1396)
- September 3 – Eleanor of Portugal, Holy Roman Empress (b. 1434)
- December 12 – Jošt of Rožmberk, Bishop of Breslau, Grand Prior of the Order of St. John (b. 1430)
- December 15 – Jöns Bengtsson Oxenstierna, archbishop and Regent of Sweden (b. 1417)
- date unknown
  - Maria of Tver, Grand Princess consort of Muscovy, spouse of Ivan III of Russia (b. 1447)
  - Peter III Aaron, prince of Moldavia
  - Jahan Shah, leader of Turkmen
  - Khan Xälil of Kazan
