= Nagara Tenjin Shrine =

Nagara Tenjin Shrine 長良天神神社
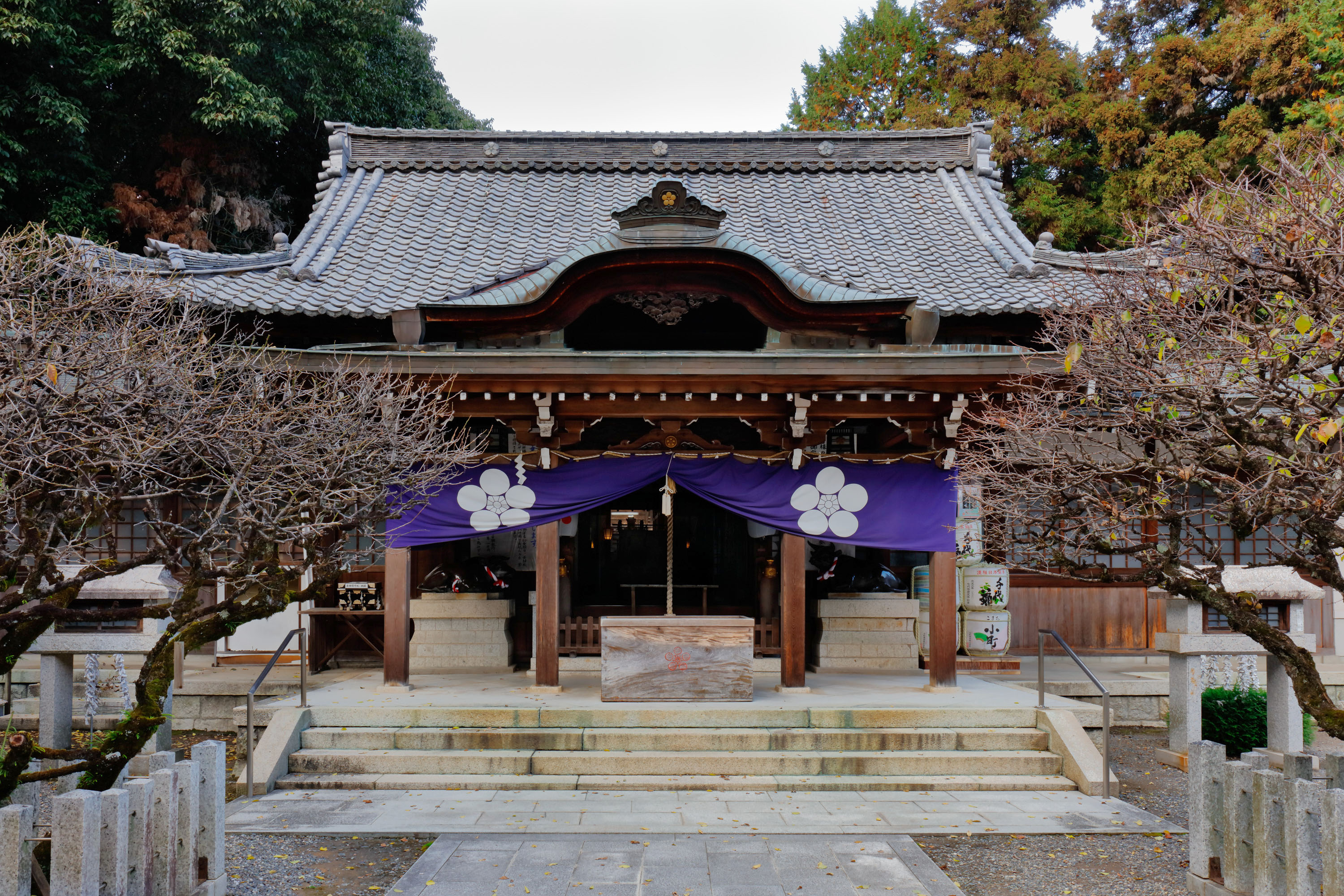
- Nagara Tenjin Shrine

- Location within Japan

Religion
- Affiliation: Shinto
- Deity: Sugawara no Michizane

Location
- Location: 1972-1 Nagara Tenjin; Gifu, Gifu Prefecture 〒502-0071; Japan
- Coordinates: 35°27′3.32″N 136°46′36.04″E

Architecture
- Established: Kanshō era

Website
- www.geocities.jp/nagartenjin/hyousi.htm%20Nagara%20Tenjin

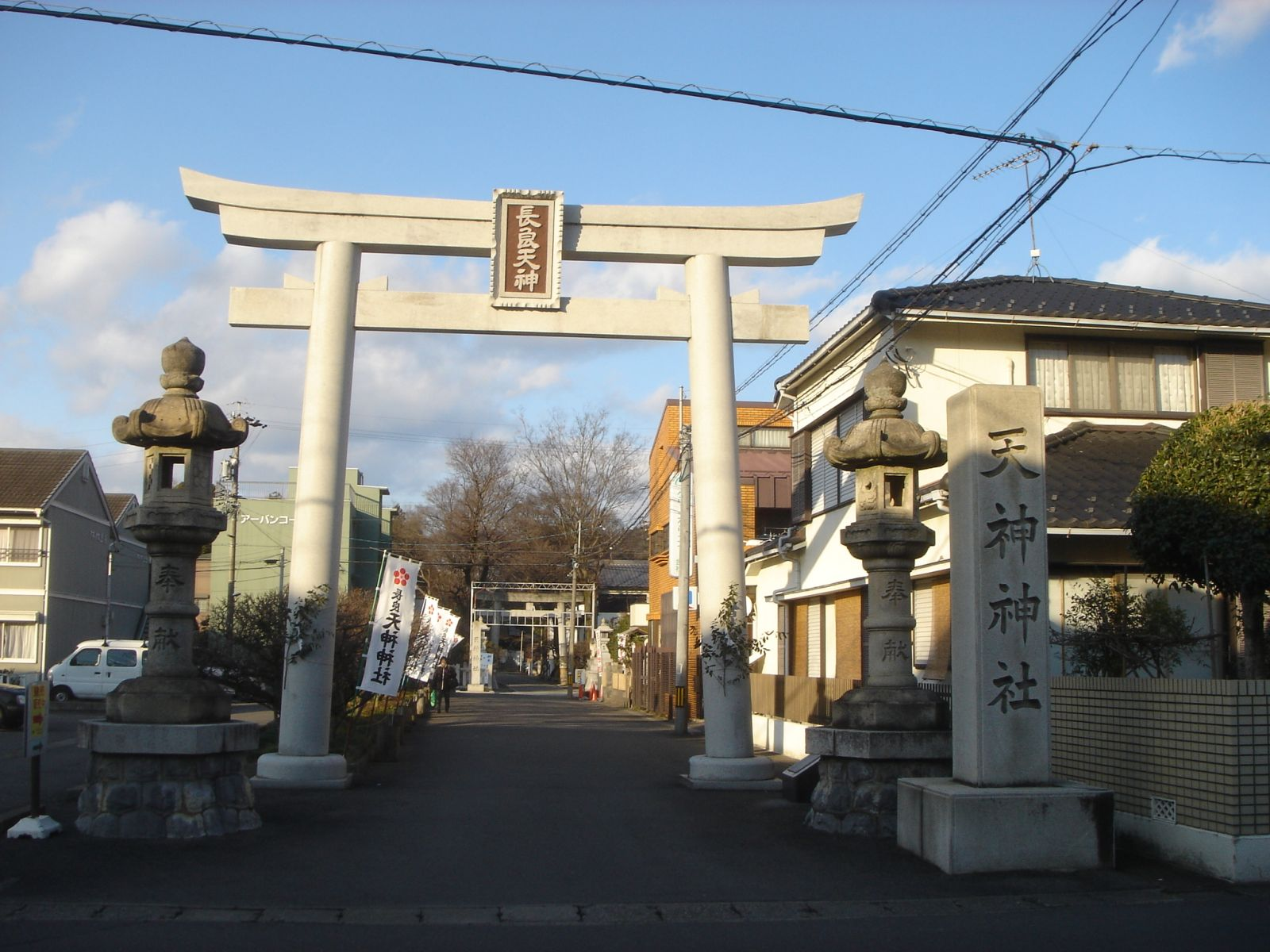
Nagara Tenjin Shrine's torii

Nagara Tenjin Shrine (長良天神神社, Nagara Tenjin Jinja) is a Shinto shrine located in the Nagara area of Gifu, Gifu Prefecture, Japan. It is a Tenman-gū dedicated to the worship of Sugawara no Michizane.

== History ==
Saitō Toshifuji (斎藤 利藤) first built Nagara Tenjin Shrine during the Kanshō era (1460–1466) with the purpose of making it the family temple for the Saitō clan. Saitō Toshiyasu (斎藤 利安) completed repair work during the Eishō era (1504–1520), but Ikeda Terumasa was responsible for major upgrades in 1588.

During the Edo period, the Nagara area was under control of the Owari Domain and the shrine was used by the heads of both the Owari and Takasu domains.

During the Keichō era (1596–1614), after the shrine's pavilions were rebuilt, the shrine suffered damage and new construction was started. The current honden was completed in 1801 and the haiden was completed in 1852.

In 1959, the shrine was struck by the Isewan Typhoon and many large trees were knocked over, damaging the shrine. Repairs were not completed until 1986.

== Images ==
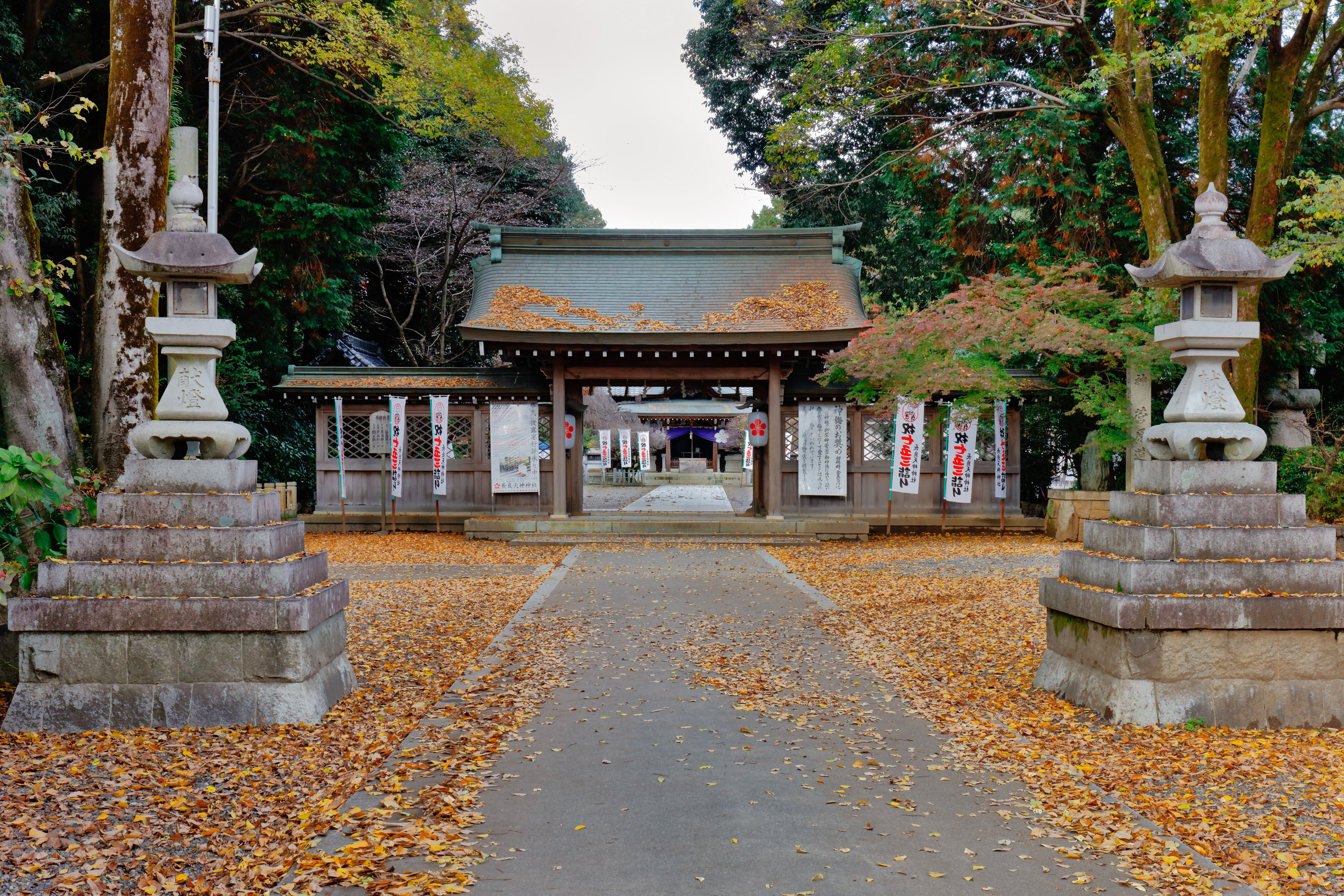

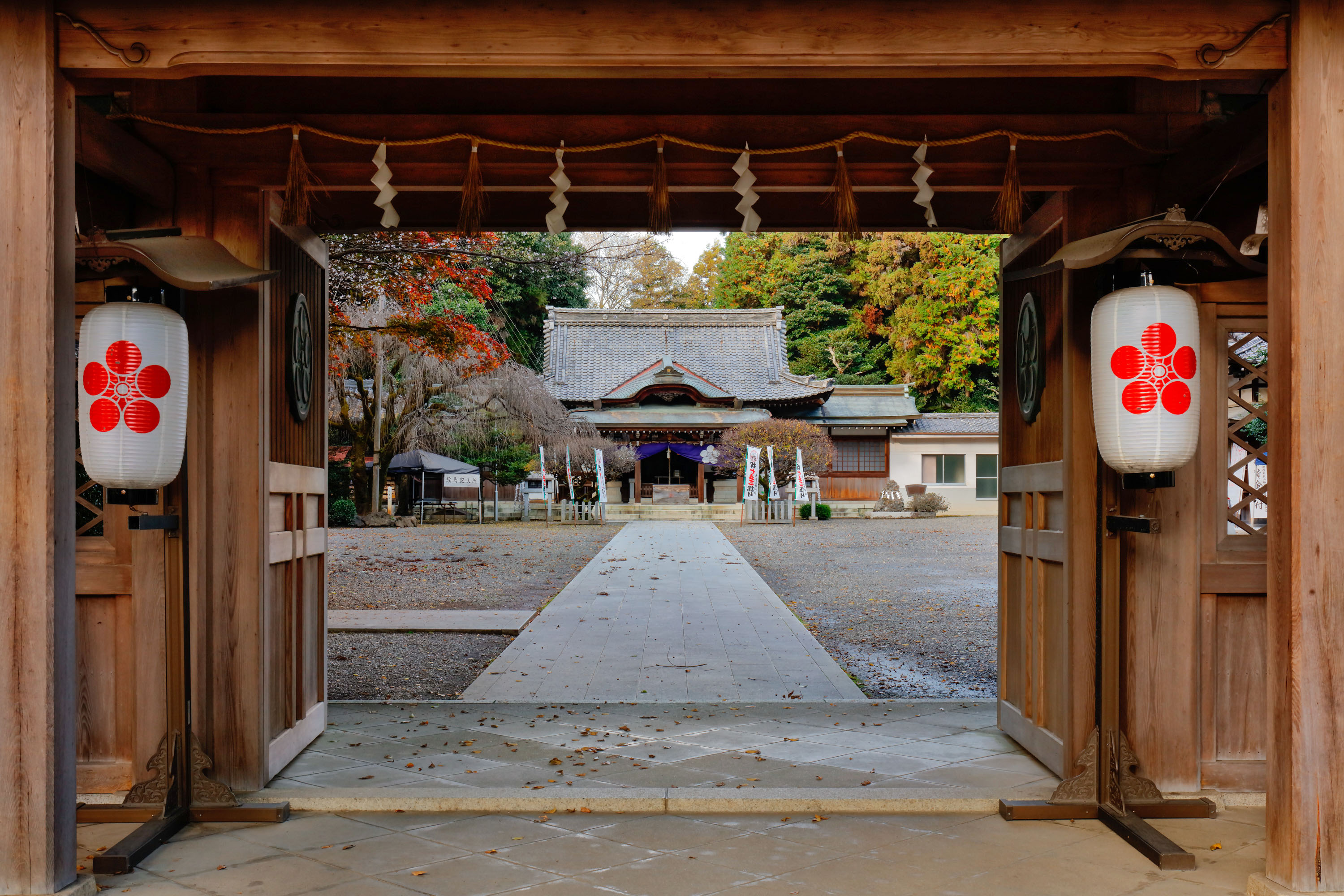

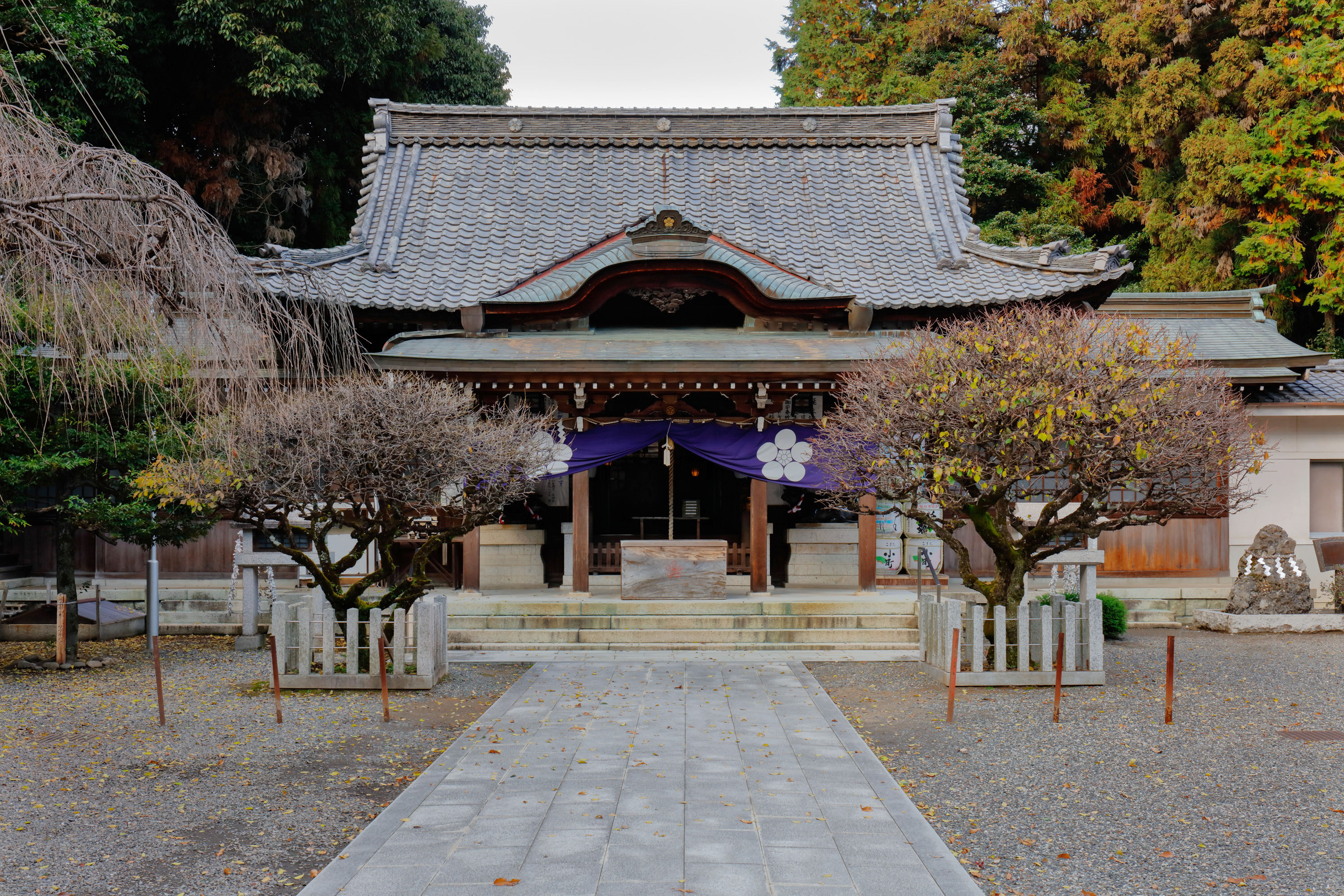

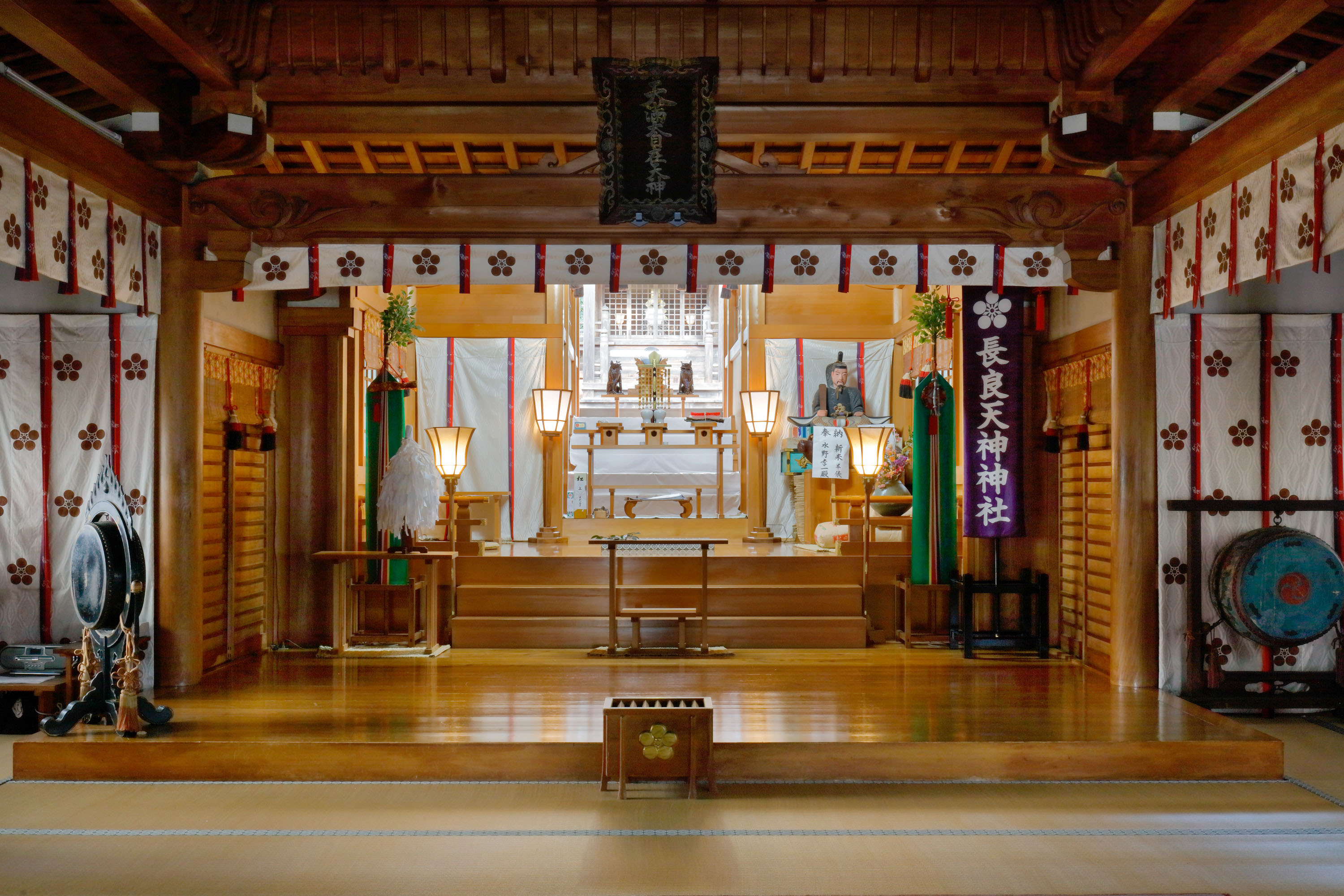

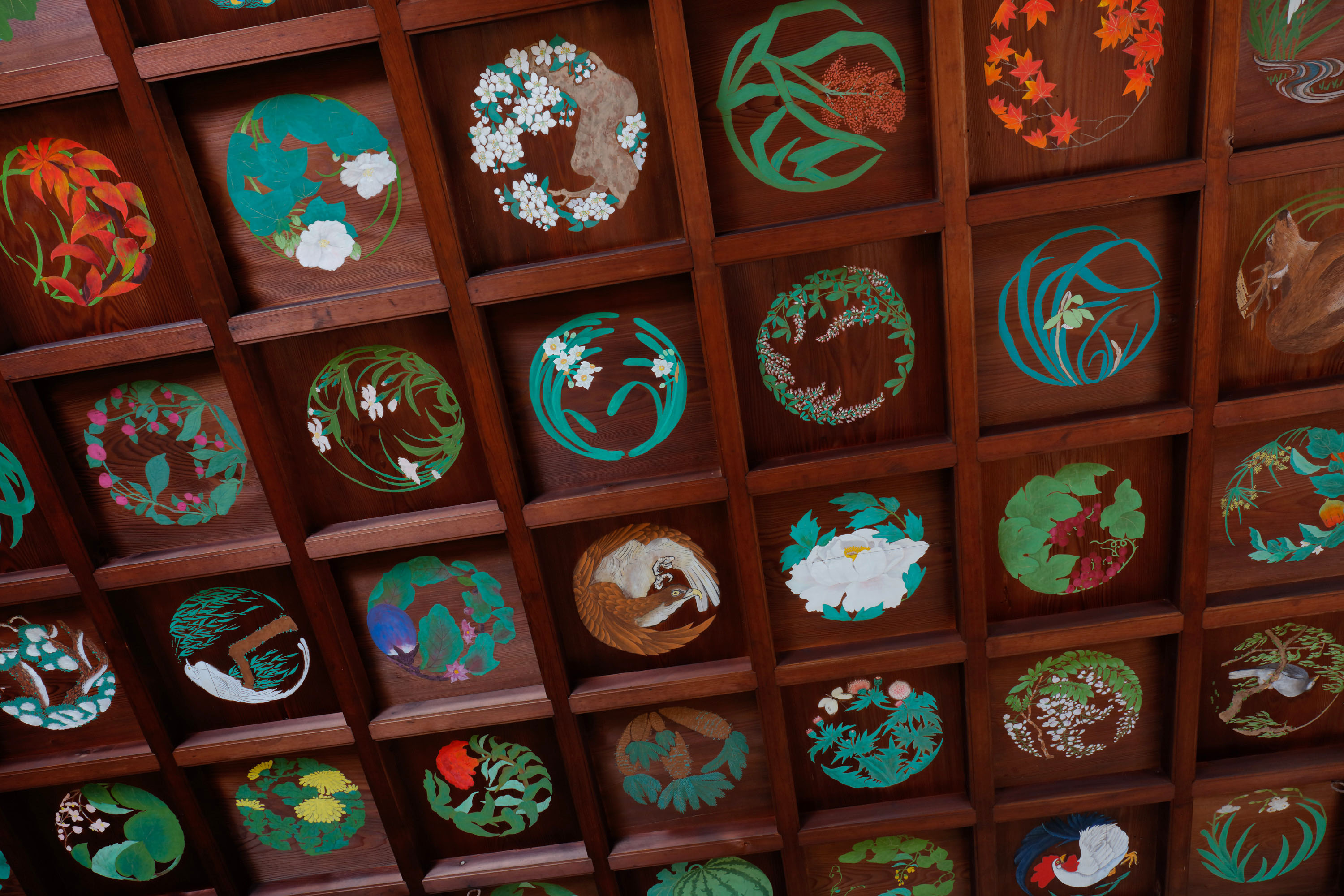

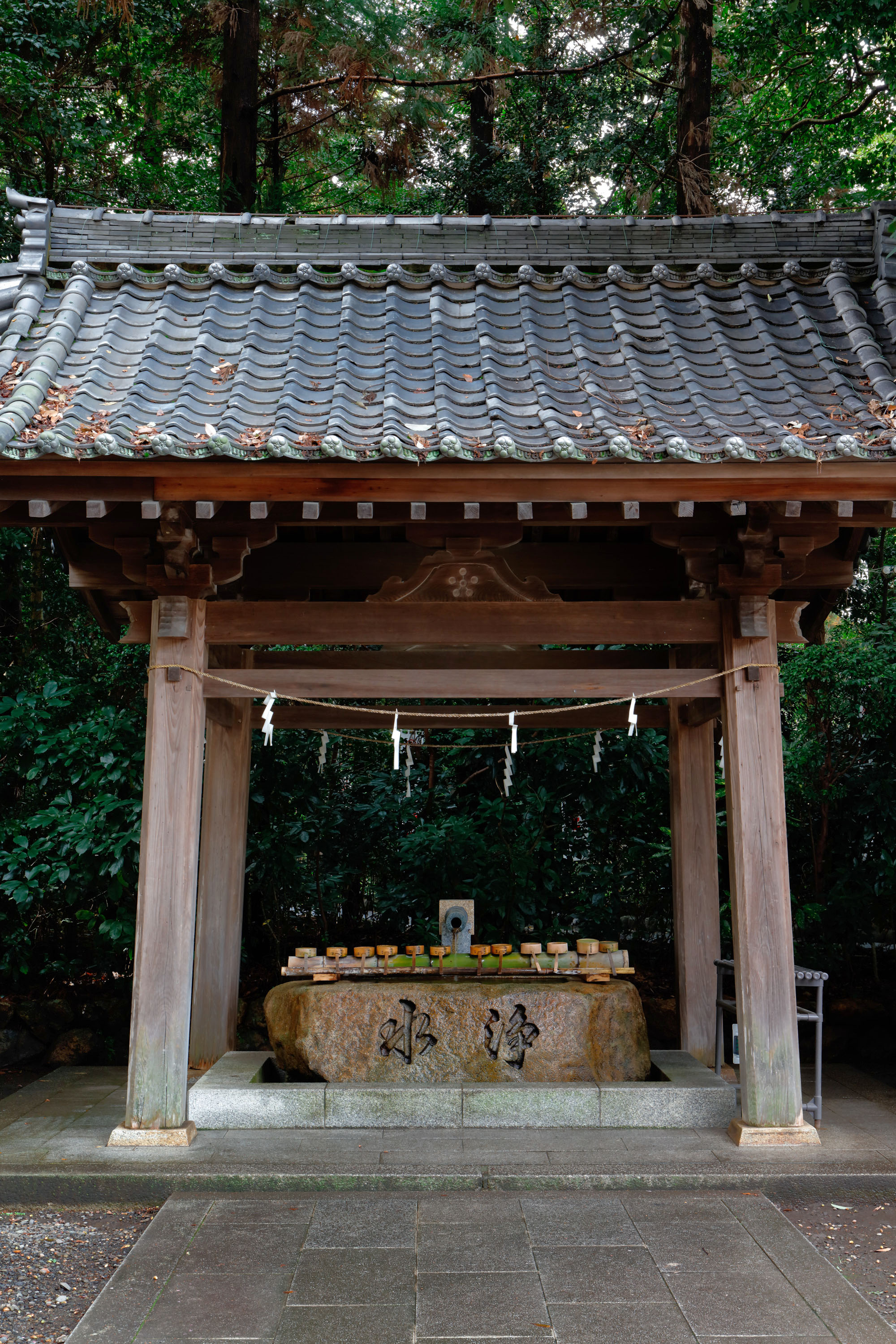

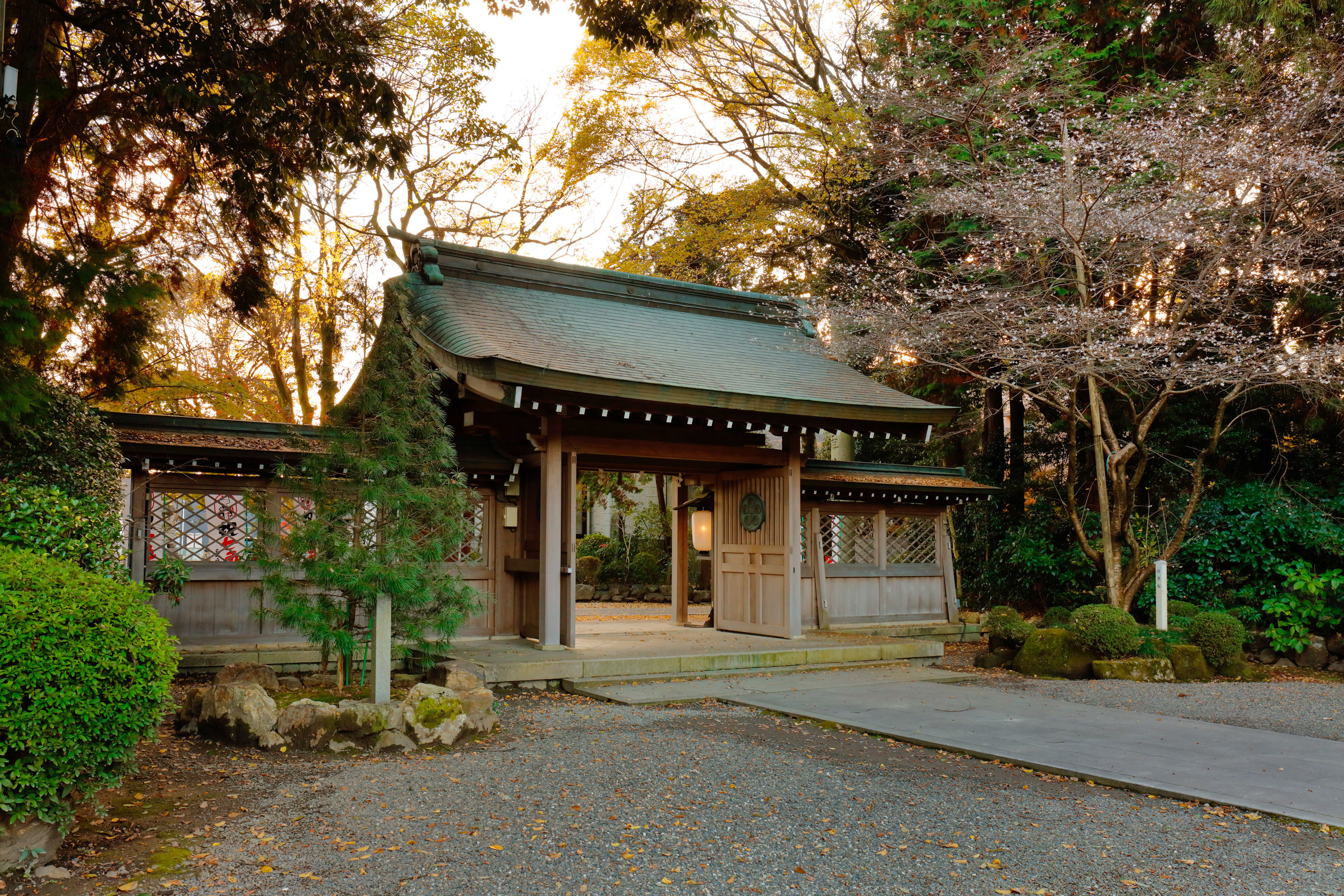
