= Chōkyō =

Period of Japanese history (1487–1489)

Chōkyō (長享) was a Japanese era name (年号, nengō, "year name") after Bunmei and before Entoku. This period spanned the years from July 1487 through August 1489. The reigning emperor was Go-Tsuchimikado-tennō (後土御門天皇).

== Change of era ==
- 1487 Chōkyō gannen (長享元年): The era name was changed to mark an event or a number of events. The old era ended and a new one commenced in Bunmei 19.

== Events of the Chōkyō era ==
- 1487 (Chōkyō 1): Takatskasa-no Masahira was replaced as kampaku by the former naidaijin Kiyosho-no Masatada.
- 1487 (Chōkyō 1, 8th month): Udaijin Ōe-no mikado Nobukatsu died at age 42.
- 1487 (Chōkyō 1, 8th month): Shōgun Yoshihisa led a large army against Rokkaku Takayori (also known as Rokkaku Tobatsu), the daimyō of southern Ōmi Province.

== Notes ==
Preceded by Bunmei	Era or nengō Chōkyō; 1487–1489	Succeeded by Entoku
