= Emperor Go-Tsuchimikado =

Emperor of Japan from 1464 to 1500

Emperor Go-Tsuchimikado 後土御門天皇
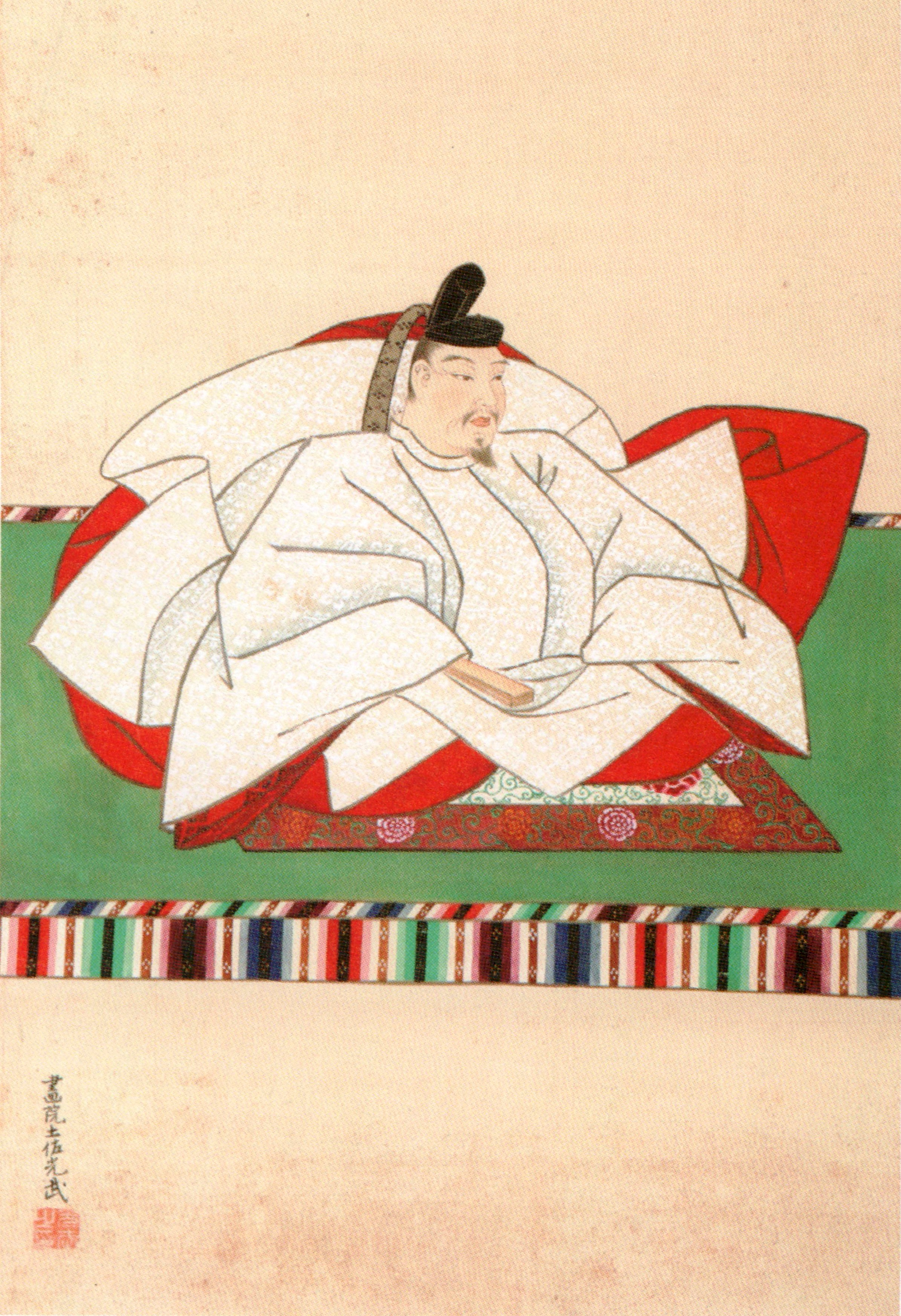
- Portrait by Tosa Mitsutake, 19th century

Emperor of Japan
- Reign: August 21, 1464 – October 21, 1500
- Enthronement: May 22, 1465
- Predecessor: Go-Hanazono
- Successor: Go-Kashiwabara
- Shōgun: Ashikaga Yoshimasa; Ashikaga Yoshihisa; Ashikaga Yoshitane; Ashikaga Yoshizumi
- Born: Fusahito (成仁); July 3, 1442
- Died: October 21, 1500 (aged 58); Kurodo no gosho (黒戸の御所), Kyoto Imperial Palace
- Burial: Fukakusa no kita no Misasagi (深草北陵) (Kyoto)
- Issue more...: Emperor Go-Kashiwabara
Posthumous name
- Tsuigō: Emperor Go-Tsuchimikado (後土御門院 or 後土御門天皇)
- House: Imperial House of Japan
- Father: Emperor Go-Hanazono
- Mother: Ōinomikado (Fujiwara) Nobuko
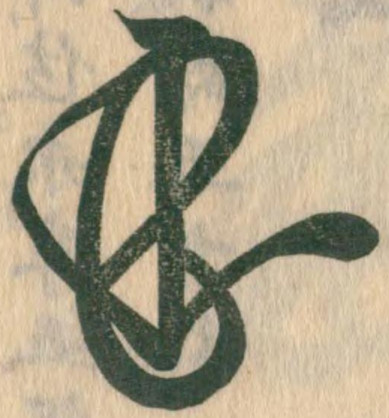
- Signature

Emperor Go-Tsuchimikado (後土御門天皇, Go-Tsuchimikado-tennō; July 3, 1442 – October 21, 1500) was the 103rd emperor of Japan, according to the traditional order of succession. His reign spanned the years from 1464 until his death in 1500.

This 15th-century sovereign was named after the 12th-century Emperor Tsuchimikado and go- (後), translates literally as "later"; and thus, he could be called the "Later Emperor Tsuchimikado", or, in some older sources, may be identified as "Emperor Tsuchimikado, the second," or as "Emperor Tsuchimikado II."

== Genealogy ==
Before his ascension to the Chrysanthemum Throne, his personal name (his imina) was Fusahito-shinnō (成仁親王).

He was the eldest son of Emperor Go-Hanazono. His mother was Ōinomikado (Fujiwara) Nobuko (大炊御門（藤原）信子), daughter of Fujiwara Takanaga (藤原高長)

- Lady-in-waiting: Niwata (Minamoto) Asako (庭田（源）朝子; 1437–1492) later Sōgyoku-mon'in (蒼玉門院), Niwata Shigekata's daughter
  - First son: Imperial Prince Katsuhito (勝仁親王) later Emperor Go-Kashiwabara
  - Second son: Imperial Prince Takaasa (1472–1504; 尊敦親王) later Imperial Prince Priest Sonden (尊伝入道親王)
  - Son: (1475)
- Lady-in-waiting: Kajūji (Fujiwara) Fusako (勧修寺（藤原）房子), Kajūji Norihide's daughter
  - First daughter: Princess Daijikō-in (大慈光院宮)
  - Fifth daughter: Princess Rishu (理秀女王)
  - Fourth daughter: Princess Chien (智円女王)
  - daughter: (1485)
- Consort: Kasannoin (Fujiwara) Tomoko (花山院（藤原）兼子), Kasannoin Mochitada's daughter
  - Third daughter: Princess Yozen (応善女王)
  - Third son: Imperial Prince Priest Ninson (仁尊法親王)
  - Second daughter: Princess Chien (知円女王)
  - Fourth son: Prince Imawaka (今若宮)
- unknown
  - Princess Jisho (慈勝女王)

== Events of Go-Tsuchimikado's life ==
- August 21, 1464 (Kanshō 5, 7th month): In the 36th year of Go-Hanazono-tennō's reign (後花園天皇三十六年), the emperor abdicated; and the succession (senso) was received by his son. Shortly thereafter, Emperor Go-Tsuchimikado is said to have acceded to the throne (sokui).

Shortly after his enthronement, the Ōnin War took place. Temples, shrines, and mansions of court nobles, among others, were burned to the ground. The Imperial Court's finances dried up, and the Court declined. The Emperor supported the Yoshida family's policy of establishing a new kind of State Shinto which could add social and political cohesion in the country devastated by civil war.

Until former-emperor Go-Komatsu died in 1433, Go-Hanazono held the title of formal head of the Daïri, the real power in the court was wielded by his uncle, who continued a practice known as cloistered rule. After this, Go-Hanazono enjoyed 30 years of direct imperial rule, until his abdication; and then the conventional pattern of indirect government by cloistered emperors was again resumed. The extended duration of Go-Tsuchimikado's reign—lasting thirty-six years, two months—is the longest of any sovereign in the historical period prior to Emperor Kōkaku.

After the end of the War, there was little enthusiasm for reviving the Imperial Court's ancient ceremonies. On October 21, 1500, the Emperor died. His successor Go-Kashiwabara lacked the funds to pay for the funeral ceremony, and the deceased emperor's body lay in a palace storeroom for over a month before a donation was made to the court, and the funeral could be observed.

Go-Tuschimikado is enshrined with other emperors at the imperial tomb called Fukakusa no kita no misasagi (深草北陵) in Fushimi-ku, Kyoto.

=== Kugyō ===
Kugyō (公卿) is a collective term for the very few most powerful men attached to the court of the Emperor of Japan in pre-Meiji eras. Even during those years in which the court's actual influence outside the palace walls was minimal, the hierarchic organization persisted.

In general, this elite group included only three to four men at a time. These were hereditary courtiers whose experience and background would have brought them to the pinnacle of a life's career. During Go-Tsuchimikado's reign, this apex of the Daijō-kan included:

- Sadaijin
- Udaijin
- Naidaijin
- Dainagon

== Eras of Go-Tsuchimikado's reign ==
The years of Go-Tsuchimikado's reign are more specifically identified by more than one era name or nengō.

- Kanshō (1460–1466)
- Bunshō (1466–1467)
- Ōnin (1467–1469)
- Bunmei (1469–1487)
- Chōkyō (1487–1489)
- Entoku (1489–1492)
- Meiō (1492–1501)

== Ancestry ==
Ancestors of Emperor Go-Tsuchimikado

8. Prince of the Blood Fushimi-no-miya Yoshihito (1351-1416)
4. Prince of the Blood Fushimi-no-miya Sadafusa (1372-1456)
9. Ōgimachisanjō Haruko (d. 1399)
2. Emperor Go-Hanazono (1419-1471)
10.Niwata Tsuneari (d. 1412)
5. Niwata Sachiko (1390-1448)
11. Asukai
1. Emperor Go-Tsuchimikado
6. Fujiwara Takahara
3. Ōinomikado Nobuko (1411-1488)

== Notes ==
Japanese Imperial kamon — a stylized chrysanthemum blossom

== See also ==
- Emperor of Japan
- List of Emperors of Japan
- Imperial cult

Regnal titles
| Preceded by Emperor Go-Hanazono | Emperor of Japan: Go-Tsuchimikado; 1464–1500 | Succeeded by Emperor Go-Kashiwabara |
