= Second Wife =

Second Wife may refer to:

- Second Wife (1936 film), a 1936 film directed by Edward Killy
- Second Wife (1930 film), a 1930 film directed by Russell Mack
- Nirmala (novel), or The Second Wife, a 1928 novel by Munshi Premchand
- The Second Wife (1922 film), a 1922 Italian silent drama film directed by Amleto Palermi
- The Second Wife (La seconda moglie | a 1917 Italian silent drama directed by Elio Gioppo)
- The Second Wife (1967 film), a 1967 Egyptian drama film
