= Furuichi Chōin =

Furuichi Chōin (1452–1508) (a.k.a. Furuichi Harima) was a minor Japanese lord and cha-no-yu aficionado during the Sengoku period. A disciple of Murata Jukō, he was the recipient of Jukō's treatise on the tea ceremony, Kokoro no fumi (心の手紙 "Letter of the heart"). He also received the Shinkei Sōzu Teikin, an essay on the composition of renga poetry, from Inawashiro Kensai.

Chōin was an acolyte at the temple at Kōfuku-ji, having been sent to study there at the age of 13. Ten years later, he became the leader of a group of warrior monks. He later became daimyō of Furuichi, a small town near Nara, and his family developed a reputation as patrons of the arts. Chōin and his brother Chōei developed the practice of rinkan chanoyu (combining the tea ceremony with the practice of communal bathing).
