= Bunmei =

Period of Japanese history (1469–1487)

Bunmei (文明; "civilization") was a Japanese era name (年号, nengō; "year name") after Ōnin and before Chōkyō. This period spanned from 8 June 1469 (28th day of 4th month of Ōnin 3 through 9 August 1487 (20th day of 7th month of Bunmei 20) The reigning emperor was Go-Tsuchimikado-tennō (後土御門天皇).

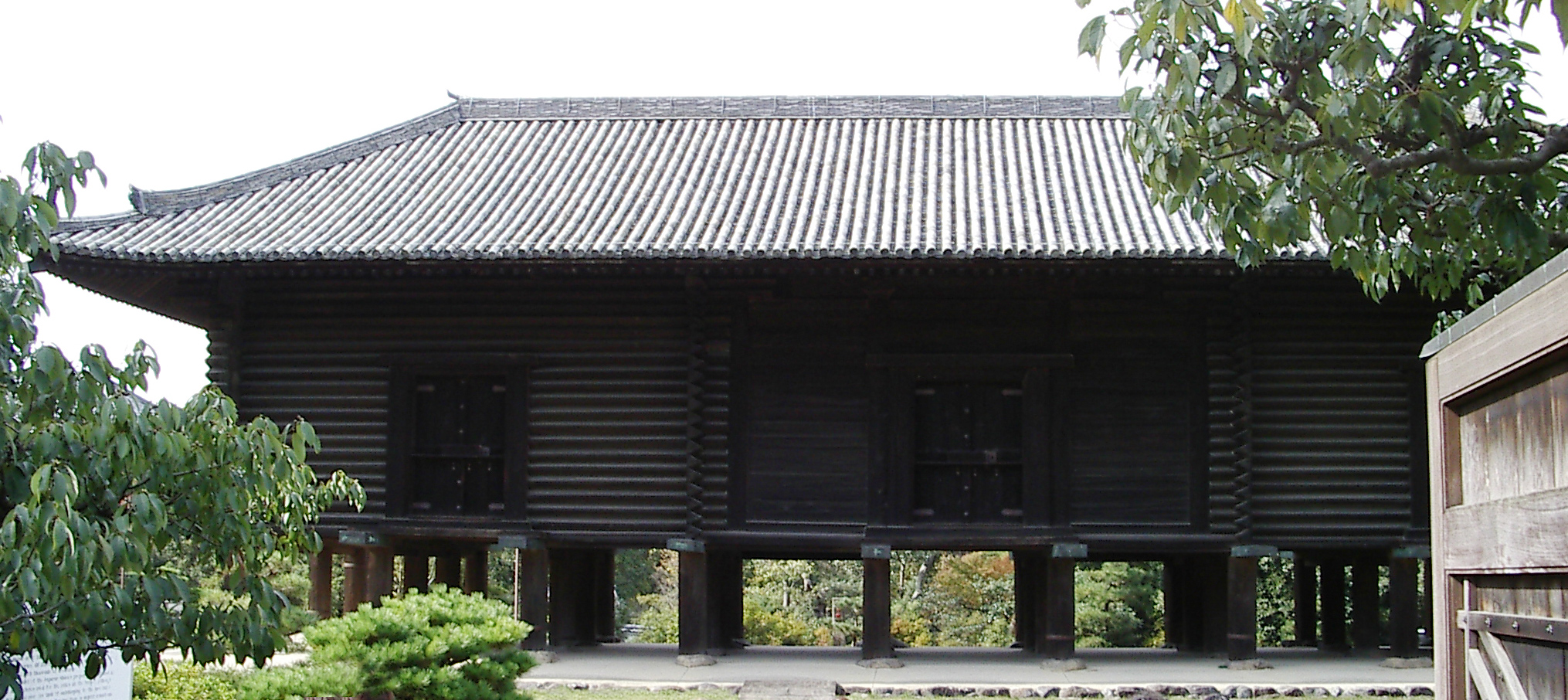
Shoso-in from the period

== Change of era ==
- 1469 Bunmei gannen (文明元年): The era name was changed to mark an event or a number of events. The old era ended and a new one commenced in Ōnin 3.

== Events of the Bunmei era ==
- 1468 (Bunmei 2, 7th month): Ichijō Kanera (1402–1481) was relieved of his duties as kampaku.
- January 18, 1471 (Bunmei 2, 27th day of the 12th month ): The former Emperor Go-Hanazono died at age 52.
- April 16, 1473 (Bunmei 5, on the 19th day of the 3rd month): Yamana Sōzen died at age 70.
- 1478 (Bunmei 10): Ichijō Kanera published Bunmei ittō-ki (On the Unity of Knowledge and Culture) which deals with political ethics and six points about the duties of a prince.
- February 21, 1482 (Bunmei 14, 4th day of the 2nd month): Construction of Ashikaga Yoshimasa's Silver Pavilion commenced.

== Notes ==
Preceded by Ōnin	Era or nengō Bunmei; 1469–1487	Succeeded by Chōkyō
