= Kanshō =

Period of Japanese history (1460–1466)

Kanshō (寛正) was a Japanese era name (年号, nengō; lit. "year name") after Chōroku and before Bunshō. This period spanned from 1 February 1461 (21st day of 12th month of Choruko 4) through 14 March 1466 (28th day of 2nd month of Kansho 7. The reigning emperors were Go-Hanazono-tennō (後花園天皇) and Go-Tsuchimikado-tennō (後土御門天皇).

== Change of era ==
- 1460 Kanshō gannen (寛正元年): The era name was changed to mark an event or a number of events. The old era ended and a new one commenced in Chōroku 4.

== Events of the Kanshō era ==
- 1460 (Kanshō 1, 9th month): Wakae Castle in Kawachi Province was destroyed when Hatakeyama Yoshinari (畠山 義就; 1437-21 January 1491) was forced out of it.
- 1461 (Kanshō 2): The Kanshō famine ceased.
- August 21, 1464 (Kanshō 5, 19th day of the 7th month): Go-Hanazono resigned his throne in favor of his son, who would be known as Emperor Go-Tsuchimikado.

== Notes ==
Preceded by Chōroku	Era or nengō Kanshō; 1460–1466	Succeeded by Bunshō
