= Entoku =

Period of Japanese history (1489–1492)

Entoku (延徳) was a Japanese era name (年号, nengō; "year name") after Chōkyō and before Meiō. This period spanned the years from August 1489 through July 1492. The reigning emperor was Go-Tsuchimikado-tennō (後土御門天皇).

== Change of era ==
- 1489 Entoku gannen (延徳元年): The era name was changed to mark an event or a number of events. The old era ended and a new one commenced in Chōkyō 3.

== Events of the Entoku era ==
- April 26, 1489 (Entoku 1, 26th day of the 3rd month): The shōgun Yoshihisa died at age 25 while leading a military campaign in Ōmi Province. He had led the shogunate for 18 years. His father, the former Shogun Yoshimasa, was strongly afflicted by his death; and because of this unanticipated development, he was moved to reconcile with his brother, Yoshimi.
- January 27, 1490 (Entoku 2, 7th day of the 1st month): The former shōgun Yoshimasa died at age 56.
- 1490 (Entoku 2, 7th month): Ashikaga Yoshimura (known as Ashikaga Yoshitane after 1501), nephew of Yoshimasa, is proclaimed as shōgun at age 25.

== Notes ==
Preceded by Chōkyō	Era or nengō Entoku; 1489–1492	Succeeded by Meiō
