= Ōnin =

Period of Japanese history (1467–1469)

Ōnin (応仁) was a Japanese era name (年号, nengō; "year name") after Bunshō and before Bunmei. This period spanned the years from 9 April 1467 (5th day of 3rd month of Bunshō 2) through 8 June 1469 (28th day of 4th month of Ōnin 3). The reigning emperor was Go-Tsuchimikado-tennō (後土御門天皇).

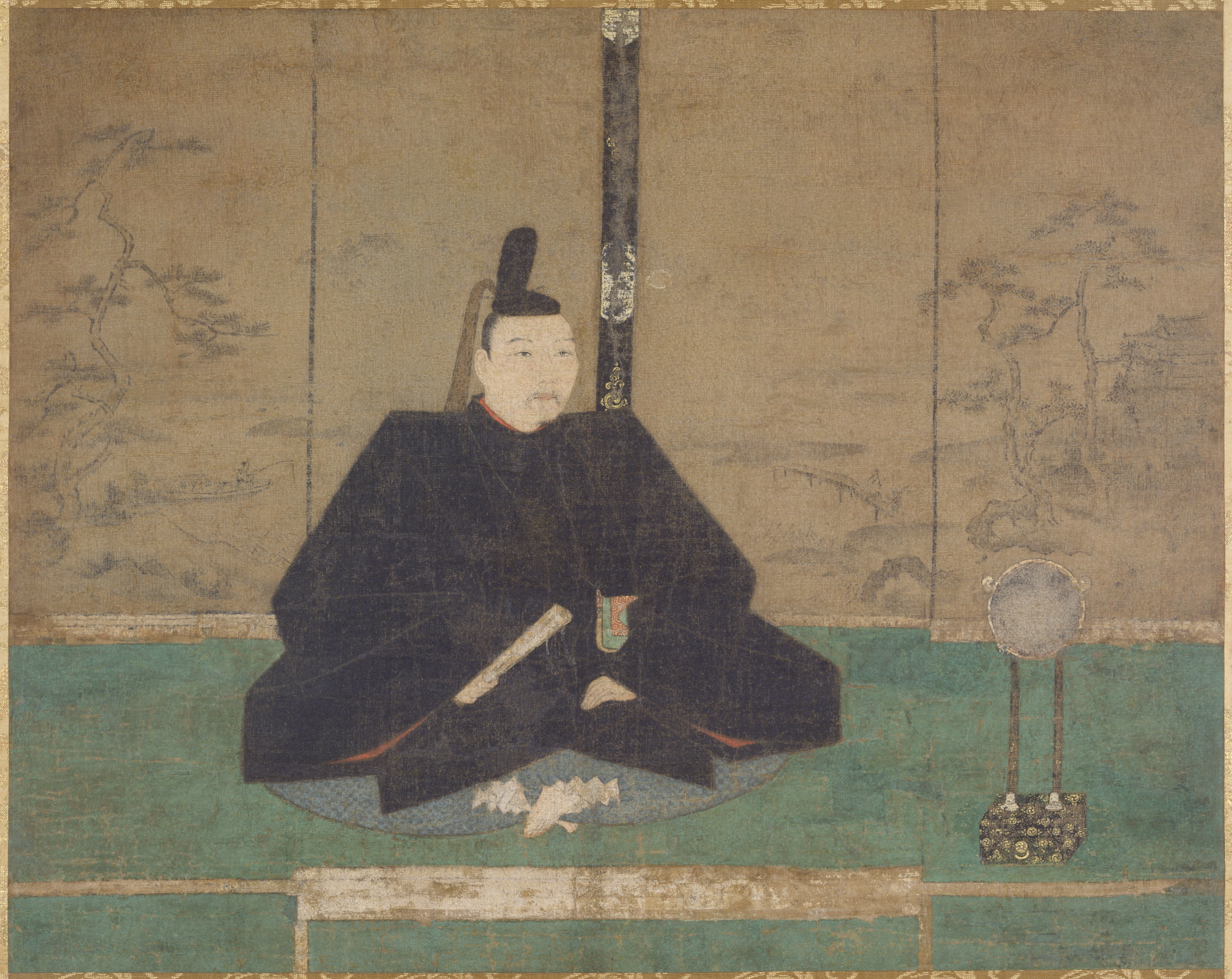
Shogun Ashikaga Yoshimasa. The struggle over who would succeed him triggered the Ōnin War.

== Change of era ==
- 1467 Ōnin gannen (応仁元年): The era name was changed to mark an event or a number of events. The old era ended and a new one commenced in Bunshō 2.

== Events of the Ōnin era ==
The Ōnin War: This conflict began as a controversy over whether at Ashikaga Yoshimasa's retirement as shōgun he should be succeeded by his brother (Yoshimi) or his son (Yoshihisa); but this succession dispute was merely a pretext for rival groups of daimyōs to fight in a struggle for military supremacy. In the end, there was no clear-cut winner. The complex array of factional armies simply fought themselves into exhaustion.

- 1467 (Ōnin 1, 1st month): Yamana Sōzen and Hatakeyama Yoshinari took up positions around the Muromachi-dono, the Ashikaga residence in Heian-kyō where the Shōgun made his headquarters. They sent for Ashikaga Yoshimi, and they also invited former-Emperor Go-Hanazono and Go-Tsuchimikado to come themselves to Muromachi to witness for themselves that Hosokawa Katsumoto and Hatakeyama Michinaga would be put to death. For his part, Yoshimi first tried to ameliorate the escalating situation. Failing that, Yoshimi ordered Yoshinari to kill Masanaga, but Yoshinari was overpowered and Masanaga fled the capital. These events caused Souzen and Yoshinari to feel afraid of what might happen next.
- 1467 (Ōnin 1, 1st month): The nadaijin Sayensi-no Saneto was replaced by Hino-no Katsumitsi.
- 1467 (Ōnin 1, 2nd month): Shiba-no Yoshikado became kanrei; and from this moment forward, the confidence and activities of Katsumoto ceased entirely. He didn't go out at all, and he began to regret that he hadn't joined Masanaga. At the same time, Souzen and Yoshinari despaired as they secretly occupied themselves with preparations for armed confrontation. They informed their clans of their plans, and they began to believe that with support from outside the capital, it would be possible to surmount any number of obstacles.
- 1467 (Ōnin 1, 5th month): Nijō Mochimitsi was removed from his role as kampaku, and Ichijō Kaneyoshi became his successor.

=== Higashiyama-dono ===
The emperor honored Yoshimasa's villa with a special name – Higashiyama-dono. Construction begins on the Silver Pavilion, but the work is interrupted by a range of disruptions associated with the Ōnin War. Significant dates in this evolving crisis were:

- 1460 (Chōroku 3): Yoshimasa initiated planning for construction of a retirement villa and gardens as early as 1460; and after his death, this property would become a Buddhist temple called Jisho-ji (also known as Ginkaku-ji or the "Silver Pavilion").
- February 21, 1482 (Bunmei 14, 4th day of the 2nd month): The long-delayed construction of the "Silver Pavilion" is actually commenced.

== Notes ==
Preceded by Bunshō	Era or nengō Ōnin; 1467–1469	Succeeded by Bunmei
