= Bunshō =

Period in Japanese history (1466–1467)

Bunshō (文正) was a Japanese era name (年号, nengō; lit. "year name") after Kanshō and before Ōnin. The period spanned the years 14 March 1466 (28th day of 2nd month of Kansho 7) through 9 April 1467 (5th day of 2nd month, Bunsho 2). The reigning emperor during this period was Go-Tsuchimikado-tennō (後土御門天皇).

== Change of era ==
- 1466 Bunshō gannen (文正元年): The era name was changed to mark an event or a number of events. The old era ended and a new one commenced in Kanshō 7.

== Events of the Bunshō era ==
- 1466 (Bunshō 1, 1st month): Dainagon Ashikaga Yoshimi, brother of the shōgun Ashikaga Yoshimasa, was promoted to the second rank of the second class in the Imperial court hierarchy.
- 1466 (Bunshō 1, 1st month): Minamoto-no Mitsihisa was replaced as udaijin by dainagon Fuijwara no Matsatsugu.

== Notes ==
| Preceded by Kanshō | Era or nengō Bunshō; 1466–1467 | Succeeded by Ōnin |
