= Emperor Shōkō =

Emperor of Japan from 1412 to 1428

Emperor Shōkō 称光天皇
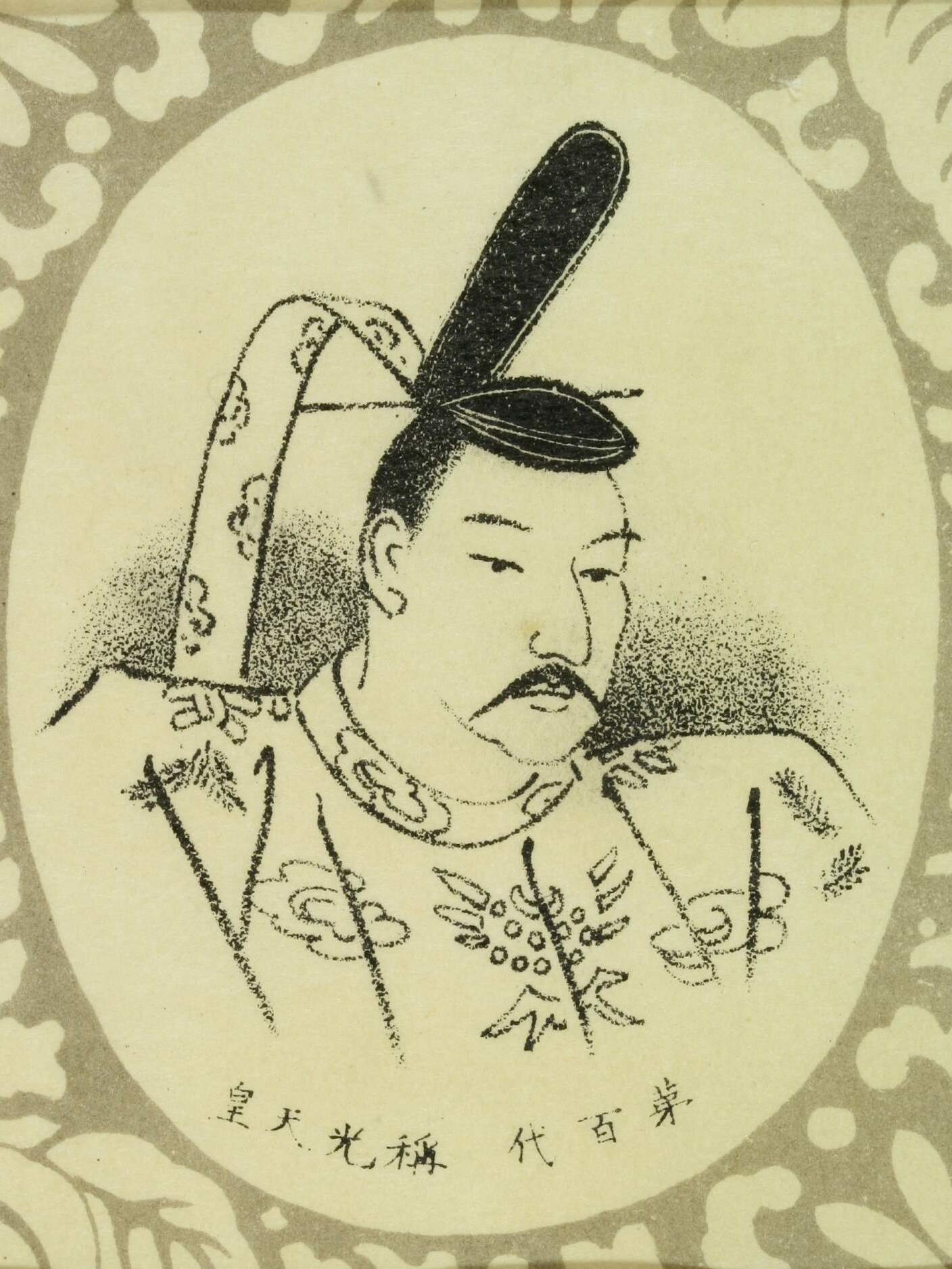
- Imaginary portrait by Kōtarō Miyake, 1894

Emperor of Japan
- Reign: October 5, 1412 – August 30, 1428
- Enthronement: January 29, 1415
- Predecessor: Go-Komatsu
- Successor: Go-Hanazono
- Shōgun: Ashikaga Yoshimochi; Ashikaga Yoshikazu
- Born: Mihito (躬仁 / 実仁); May 12, 1401
- Died: August 30, 1428 (aged 27); Kurodo no gosho (黒戸の御所), Kyoto Imperial Palace
- Burial: Fukakusa no kita no Misasagi (深草北陵) (Kyoto)
- Issue: 2 daughters
Posthumous name
- Tsuigō: Emperor Shōkō (称光院 or 称光天皇)
- House: Imperial House of Japan
- Father: Emperor Go-Komatsu
- Mother: Hinonishi Sukeko
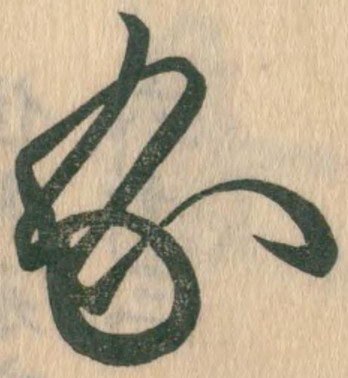
- Signature

Emperor Shōkō (称光天皇, Shōkō-tennō; May 12, 1401 – August 30, 1428) was the 101st emperor of Japan, according to the traditional order of succession. His reign spanned the years from 1412 through 1428.

== Genealogy ==
His personal name was Mihito (initially written as 躬仁, and later written as 実仁). He was the eldest son of Emperor Go-Komatsu. His mother was Hinonishi Motoko (日野西資子), daughter of Hino Sukekuni (日野資国). He had no children of his own, and was succeeded by his third cousin, Emperor Go-Hanazono, great-grandson of the Northern Pretender Emperor Sukō.

The name "Shōkō" (称光) was formed by taking one kanji from the names of the 48th and 49th imperial rulers Empress Shōtoku (称徳) and Emperor Kōnin (光仁).

Empress Shōtoku (称徳)

↓

"Shōkō" (称光)

↑

Emperor Kōnin (光仁)

=== Issue ===
- Lady-in-waiting: Fujiwara (Hino) Mitsuko (藤原（日野）光子), Hino Katsumitsu’s daughter
- Naishi: Minamoto (Itsutsuji) Tomoko (源（五辻）朝子), Itsutsuji Tomonaka’s daughter
  - daughter: (b.1418)
- Naishi: Takakura Nagafuji’s daughter
- Court Lady: Iyo no Tsubone (伊予局), Jimyoin Motochika’s daughter
  - daughter: (b.1426)
- Court Lady: Kii no Tsubone (紀伊局), Kamo Tomo’s daughter

== Events of Shōkō's life ==
He reigned from October 5, 1412 until his death on August 30, 1428.

Shōkō became emperor upon the abdication of his father, Go-Komatsu in Ōei 18, in the 10th month (October 5, 1412). His actual coronation date was two years later.

The "retired" Go-Komatsu ruled as a Cloistered Emperor during Shōkō's reign.

Shōkō was connected to Ashikaga Yoshimitsu and the Hino clan through his mother's side.

Shōkō-tennō was only 12 years old when he assumed the role of formal head of the Daïri; but "Go-Komatsu-in" had direction of the court [and] the Shōgun Ashikaga Yoshimochi was charged with the general superintendence of affairs."

- October 5, 1412 (Ōei 18, on the 18th day of the 9th month): Emperor Shōkō was made the new sovereign upon the abdication of his father, Emperor Go-Komatsu; and the succession (‘‘senso’’) was received.

Shōkō was only 12 years old when he began living in the daïri; but Go-Komatsu, as a Cloistered Emperor still retained direction of the court and the Shōgun was charged with the general superintendence of affairs.

- 1413 (Ōei 20): Shōgun Ashikaga Yoshimochi fell ill, and so he sent an ambassador to the Ise Shrine to pray for the return of his health.
- January 29, 1415 (Ōei 21, on the 19th day of the 12th month): Enthronement of Emperor Shōkō was two years after the senso was received. At this point, Emperor Shōkō is said to have acceded to the throne (‘‘sokui’’).
- 1418 (Ōei 25): Ashikaga Yoshimochi ordered Asama Shrine, at the base of Mount Fuji in Suruga province, to be re-built.
- July 18, 1419 (Ōei 26, on the 26th day of the 6th month): Oei Invasion. Korea invaded Tsushima Province.
- 1423 (Ōei 30, 2nd month): Shōgun Yoshimochi retired in favor of his son, Ashikaga Yoshikatsu, who was 17 years old.
- March 17, 1425 (Ōei 32, on the 27th day of the 2nd month): Shōgun Yoshikatsu died at the age of 19 years, having administered the empire for only three years.
- February 3, 1428 (Shōchō 1, 18th day of the 1st month): Shōgun Ashikaga Yoshimochi, having taken power again after the death of his son, died himself at the age of 43.
- August 30, 1428 (Shōchō 1, 20th day of the 7th month): Emperor Shōkō died at the age of 27.Nihon Ōdai Ichiran suggests a cause of death by explaining: "Ce prince, s'occupait de magie et du culte de démons, mens une vie pure, et observa rigoureusement l'abstinence et le jeùne." ("This prince, who occupied himself with magic and the cult of demons, led a pure life, and rigorously observed abstinence and fasting.")

Shōkō had no heirs of his own; and for this reason, Emperor Go-Komatsu selected Shōkō's third cousin for Shōkō to adopt as heir. This cousin would accede to the Chrysanthemum Throne at age 10 as Emperor Go-Hanazono on September 7, 1428 (Shōchō 1, 29th day of the 7th month): Emperor Go-Hanazono accedes to the throne at age 10.

He is enshrined with other emperors at the imperial tomb at Fukakusa no kita no Misasagi (深草北陵) in Fushimi-ku, Kyoto.

=== Kugyō ===
Kugyō (公卿) is a collective term for the very few most powerful men attached to the court of the Emperor of Japan in pre-Meiji eras. Even during those years in which the court's actual influence outside the palace walls was minimal, the hierarchic organization persisted.

In general, this elite group included only three to four men at a time. These were hereditary courtiers whose experience and background would have brought them to the pinnacle of a life's career. During Shōkō's reign, this apex of the Daijō-kan included:

- Sadaijin
- Udaijin
- Nadaijin
- Dainagon

== Eras of Shōkō's reign ==
The years of Shōkō's reign are more specifically identified by more than one era name or nengō.

- Ōei (1394–1428)
- Shōchō (1428–1429)

== Notes ==
Japanese Imperial kamon — a stylized chrysanthemum blossom

== See also ==
- Emperor of Japan
- List of Emperors of Japan
- Imperial cult

Regnal titles
Preceded by Emperor Go-Komatsu	Emperor of Japan: Shōkō; 1412–1428	Succeeded by Emperor Go-Hanazono
