= Ashikaga Yoshikazu =

Military ruler of Japan from 1423 to 1425

- 足利 義量
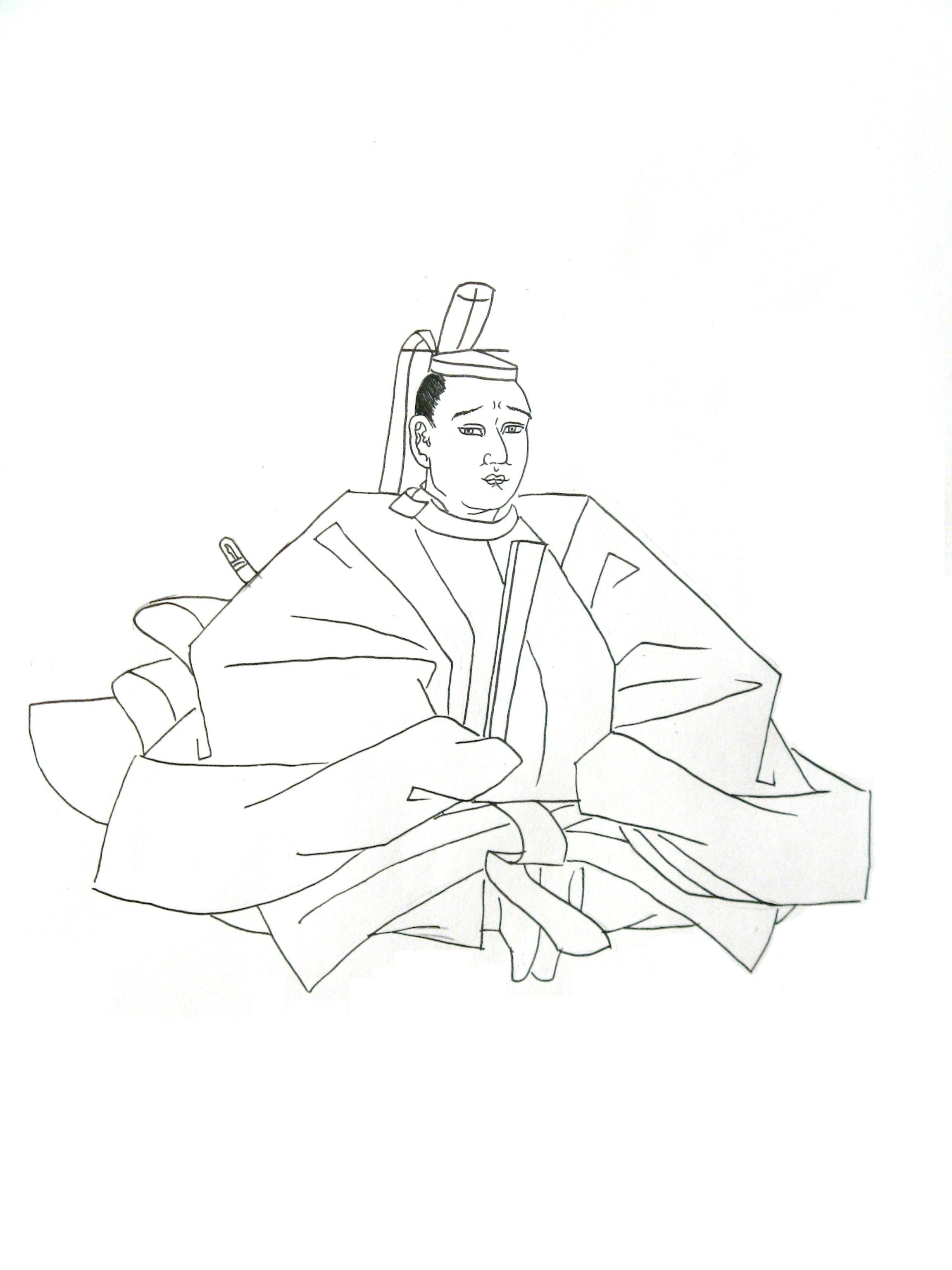

Shōgun
- In office 1423–1425
- Monarch: Shōkō
- Preceded by: Ashikaga Yoshimochi
- Succeeded by: Ashikaga Yoshimochi

Personal details
- Born: August 27, 1407
- Died: March 17, 1425 (aged 17)
- Parents: Ashikaga Yoshimochi (father); Hino Eishi (mother)

Ashikaga Yoshikazu (足利 義量; August 27, 1407 – March 17, 1425) was the fifth shōgun of the Ashikaga shogunate who reigned from 1423 to 1425 during the Muromachi period of medieval Japan. Yoshikazu was the son of the fourth shōgun Ashikaga Yoshimochi.

Yoshimochi ceded power to his son, and Yoshikazu became Sei-i Taishōgun at age 18 by East Asian age reckoning, but he would die within two years. According to Oguri Hangan ichidaiki, Yoshikazu's death was hastened by a life of drunken dissipation. His buddhist name was Chōtoku-in (長得院).

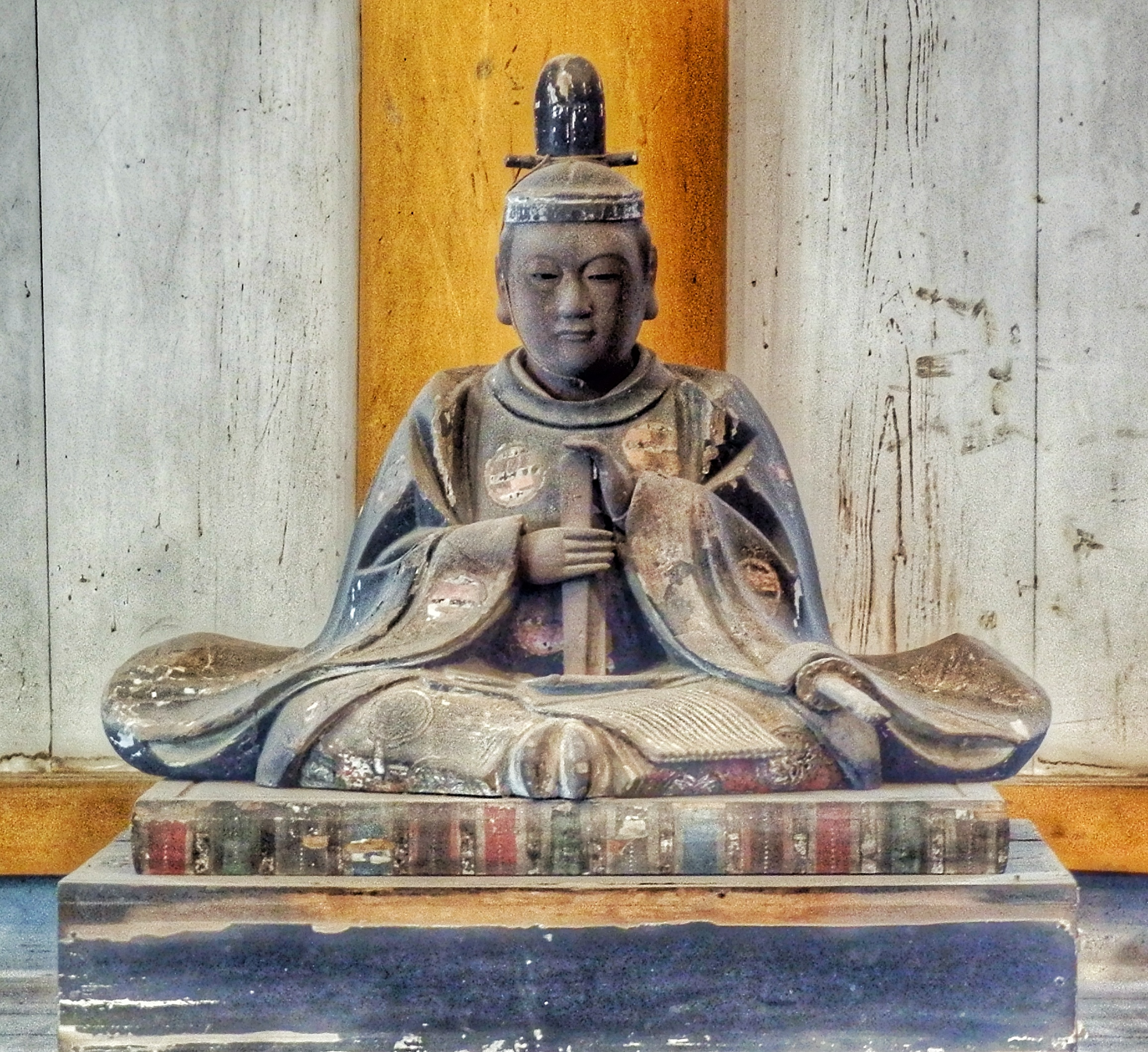
Wooden statue of Yoshikazu at Banna-ji.

In 1423, Yoshikazu was appointed as shōgun. A year later, the Emperor Go-Kameyama dies. Yoshikazu would rule for a brief reign as he dies in 1425 and is succeeded by his father Yoshimochi that same year. When his father died in 1428, Go-Hanazono ascends the throne in second repudiation of agreement. The sixth official shōgun became Ashikaga Yoshinori in 1429.

== Era of Yoshikazu's bakufu ==
The years in which Yoshikazu was shōgun are encompassed within a single era name or nengō.

- Ōei (1394–1428)

== See also ==
- East Asian age reckoning

== Notes ==
Preceded by Ashikaga Yoshimochi	Shōgun: Ashikaga Yoshikazu; 1423–1425	Succeeded by Ashikaga Yoshinori
