= Battle of Uji (1221) =

Battle in Japan

Third Battle of Uji
- Part of the Jōkyū War
Date	May 1221
Location	Uji, near Kyoto 34°52′51″N 135°46′46″E
Result	Shogunate victory
Territorial changes	Emperor exiled to Oki island

Belligerents
Kamakura shogunate and allies	Clans loyal to Emperor Go-Toba

Commanders and leaders
Hōjō Yoshitoki; Hōjō Yasutoki	Emperor Go-Toba

Strength
100,000	10,000

Casualties and losses
2,000–3,000	6,000–8,000
- Location within Japan

The third battle at the Uji River was the primary battle of the Jōkyū War in Japan. Bakufu forces led by Hōjō Yoshitoki, shikken (regent) of the Kamakura shogunate, sought to enter Kyoto and overthrow Emperor Go-Toba, using Uji and Seta as their gateways.

The Emperor's forces, alongside warrior monks from Mount Hiei, attempted to make a final stand at the bridge into Kyoto, defending it from the Shōgun's armies.

The bakufu forces attacked the entire river line from Uji to Seta, and the Imperial forces stood firm for many hours. However, eventually they broke through and scattered the remaining defenders, and opening the way into the city for the rest of their rebel forces.

As had happened twice before (see Battle of Uji), the bridge over the Uji-gawa proved to be a tactically crucial entryway into Kyoto, and highly defensible; but, as before, it was ultimately not defensible enough and the attackers crossed the river and entered Kyoto.
