= Ashikaga Yoshimochi =

Japanese Samurai, Daimyo and Military ruler of Japan from 1394 to 1423

- 足利 義持
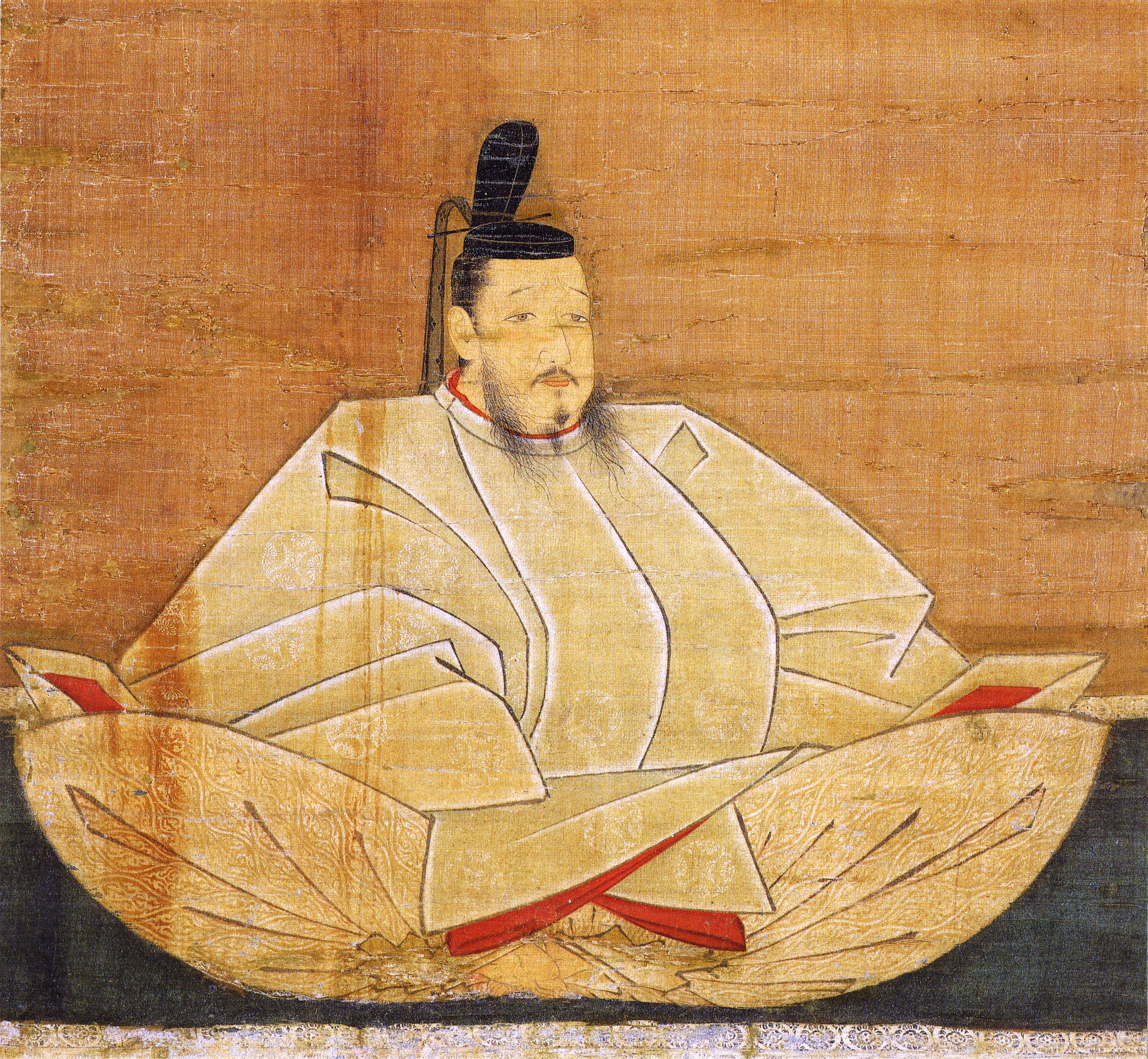

Shōgun
- In office 1425–1428
- Monarch: Shōkō
- Preceded by: Ashikaga Yoshikazu
- Succeeded by: Ashikaga Yoshinori
- In office 1394–1423
- Monarchs: Go-Komatsu; Shōkō
- Preceded by: Ashikaga Yoshimitsu
- Succeeded by: Ashikaga Yoshikazu

Personal details
- Born: March 12, 1386
- Died: February 3, 1428 (aged 41)
- Spouse: Hino Eishi
- Children: Ashikaga Yoshikazu
- Parents: Ashikaga Yoshimitsu (father); Fujiwara no Yoshiko (mother)
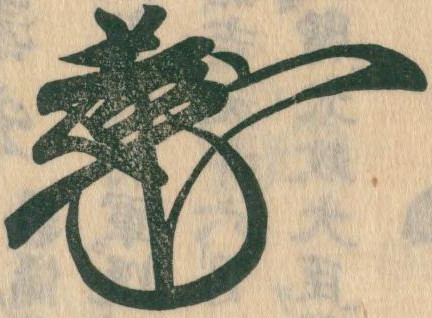
- Signature

Ashikaga Yoshimochi (足利 義持; March 12, 1386 – February 3, 1428) was a Japanese samurai, daimyo and the fourth shōgun of the Ashikaga shogunate who first reigned from 1394 to 1423, and then again from 1425 to his death in 1428 during the Muromachi period of Japan. Yoshimochi was the son of the third shōgun, Ashikaga Yoshimitsu, and the elder brother of the sixth shōgun, Ashikaga Yoshinori.

== Succession and rule ==
In 1394, Yoshimitsu gave up his shogunal title in favor of his young son, and Yoshimochi was formally confirmed in his office as Sei-i Taishōgun. Despite any appearance of retirement, the old shōgun didn't abandon any of his powers, and Yoshimitsu continued to maintain authority over the shogunate until his death. Yoshimochi exercised unfettered power as shōgun only after his father died in 1408.

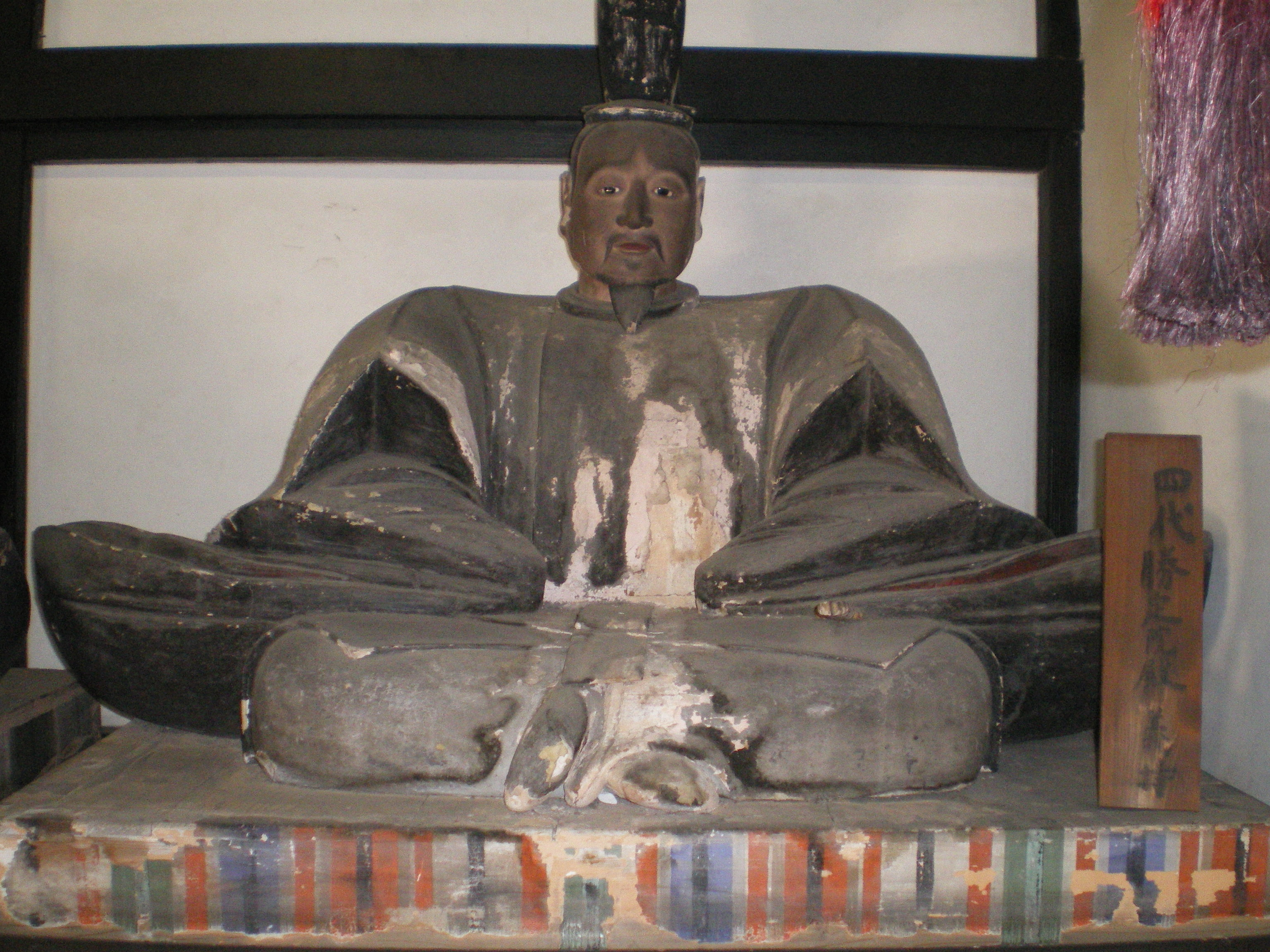
Statue of Yoshimochi

In 1398, during the sixth year of the reign of King Taejo of Joseon, a diplomatic mission was sent to Japan. Pak Ton-ji and his retinue arrived in Kyoto in 1398 (Ōei 5, 8th month). Shogun Yoshimochi presented the envoy with a formal diplomatic letter; and presents were given for the envoy to convey to the Joseon court.

In 1408, Yoshimochi came into his own as a shōgun. The next year Ashikaga Mochiuji became Kantō kubō. In 1411, Yoshimochi broke off relations with Ming China. Emperor Go-Komatsu abdicated in 1413, therefore Emperor Shōkō ascended to the throne in repudiation of an agreement. This resulted in renewed hostility between the shogunate and supporters of the Southern Court. Dissension erupted between Ashikaga Mochiuji, the Kantō Kubō in Kamakura, and Uesugi Zenshū (the Kantō Kanrei) in 1415, and the Uesugi clan rebelled the following year, but it was quelled by Mochiuji by 1417.

A Korean attack on Tsushima (Ōei Invasion) happened in 1419, and a serious famine with great loss of life occurred the next year. In 1422, there was a resurgence in supporters of the Southern Court. Yoshimochi ceded authority to his son in 1423, but he had to retake responsibilities of the office of Shōgun when his son died in 1425. Yoshimochi followed his father's example by formally ceding his powers to a young son, who became the fifth Shōgun Ashikaga Yoshikazu, who was then 18.

== Family ==
- Father: Ashikaga Yoshimitsu
- Mother: Fujiwara no Yoshiko (1358–1399)
- Wife: Hino Eiko (1390–1431)
- Concubines:
  - Tokudaiji Toshiko
  - Kohyoe-dono
- Children:
  - Ashikaga Yoshikazu

== Era of Yoshimochi's bakufu ==
The years in which Yoshimochi was shōgun are more specifically identified by one era name or nengō.

- Ōei (1394–1428)

== Notes ==
Preceded by Ashikaga Yoshimitsu	Shōgun: Ashikaga Yoshimochi; 1394–1423	Succeeded by Ashikaga Yoshikazu
