= Jōkyū War =

Failed imperial rebellion against the shogunate

Date	1221
Location	Kyoto and surrounding areas
Result	Shogunate victory

Belligerents
Kamakura shogunate and allies	Warrior families loyal to Go-Toba

Commanders and leaders
Hōjō Yoshitoki; Hōjō Yasutoki	Go-Toba

Strength
190,000 (disputed)	12,000

Jōkyū War (承久の乱, jōkyū no ran), also known as the Jōkyū Disturbance or the Jōkyū Rebellion, was fought in Japan between the forces of Retired Emperor Go-Toba and those of the Hōjō clan, regents of the Kamakura shogunate, whom the retired emperor was trying to overthrow.

The decisive battle of the conflict was fought at Uji in 1221, the third year of the Jōkyū era, just outside the imperial capital of Kyōto. It was the third battle to be fought there in less than half a century.

== Background ==
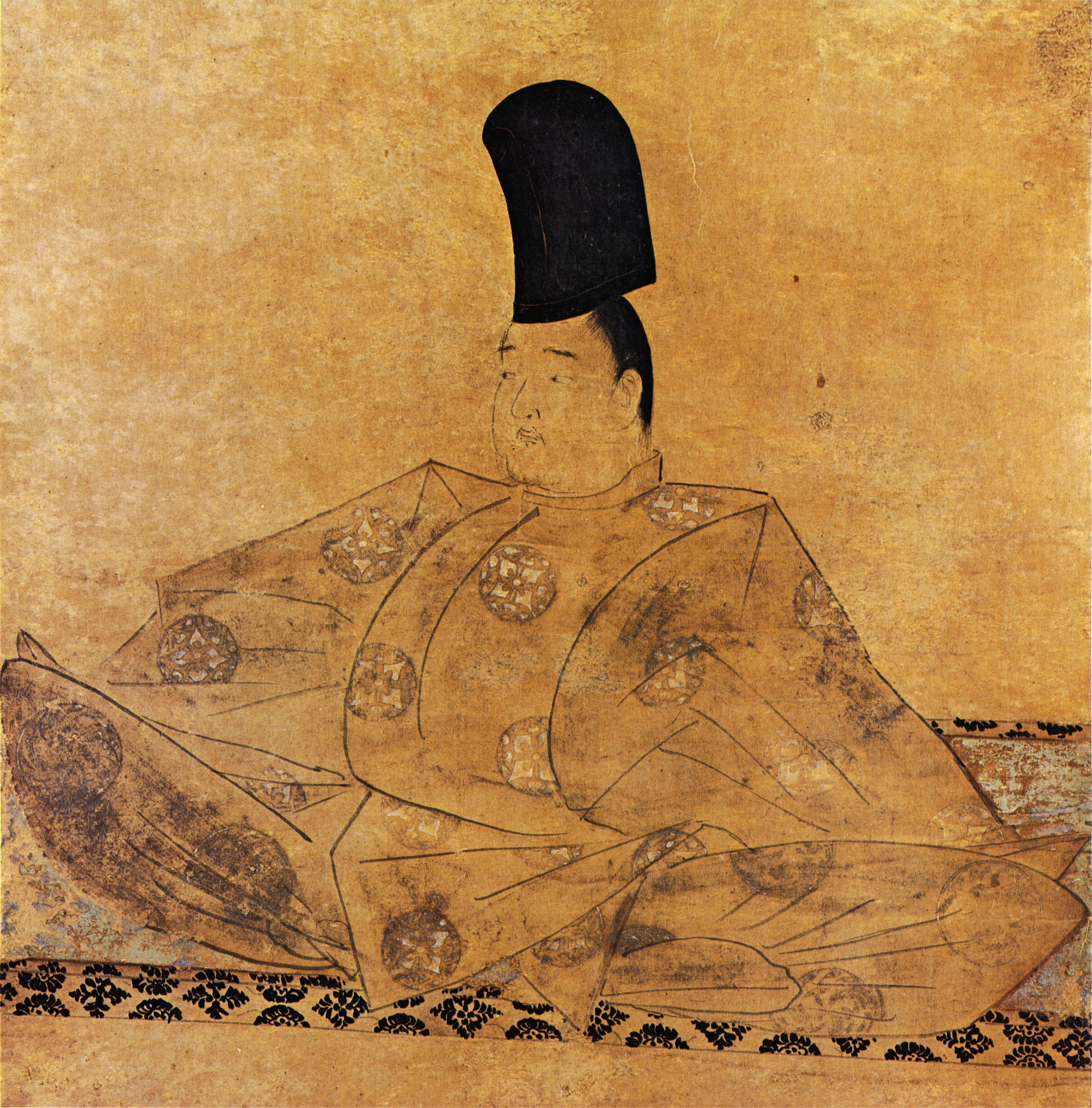
Retired Emperor Go-Toba, leader of the Jōkyū War.

In the beginning of the 13th century, Emperor Go-Toba found his attempts at political maneuvers blocked by the Kamakura shogunate. Seeking independence, and the power he considered rightfully his as the ruler of Japan, Go-Toba gathered allies in 1221, and planned to effect an overthrow of the shogunate. These allies consisted primarily of members of the Taira clan, and other enemies of the Minamoto, the victors in the Genpei War, and clan of the shōguns.

Accounts of the first Imperial banner appear in this period, and the very first is said to have been one that Go-Toba gave to a general during this war. Sun and moon images were embroidered or painted with gold or silver on a red brocade.

== Provocation and attack ==
In the fifth lunar month of 1221, the Retired Emperor Go-Toba decided on lines of succession, without consulting the shogunate and powerful Hōjō clan. He then invited a great number of potential allies from amongst the eastern warriors of Kyoto to a great festival, thus revealing the loyalties of those who rejected the invitation. One important officer revealed his loyalty to the shogunate by doing so, and was killed. Several days later, the Imperial Court declared Hōjō Yoshitoki, the regent and representative of the shogunate, to be an outlaw, and three days later the entirety of eastern Japan had officially risen in rebellion.

Hōjō Yoshitoki decided to launch an offensive against Go-Toba's forces in Kyoto, using much the same three-pronged strategy as was employed a few decades earlier. One came from the mountains, one from the north, and the third, commanded by Yoshitoki's son Yasutoki, approached via the Tōkaidō road.

These forces faced meager opposition and resistance on their way to the capital; the Imperial commanders were simply outfought. When Go-Toba heard of this string of defeats, he left the city for Mount Hiei, where he asked for aid from the sōhei, the warrior monks of Mount Hiei. They declined, citing weakness, and Go-Toba returned to Kyoto. The remnants of the Imperial army fought their final stand at the bridge over the river Uji, where the opening battle of the Genpei War had been fought 41 years earlier. Yasutoki's cavalry pushed through, scattering the Imperial forces, and pressed on to Kyoto.

The capital was taken by the Shogun's forces, and Go-Toba's rebellion was put to an end. Go-Toba was banished to the Oki Islands, from where he never returned. His sons were also banished, including Retired Emperor Tsuchimikado (to Tosa) and Retired Emperor Juntoku (to Sado), and the recently enthroned Emperor Chūkyō, the first son of Juntoku, was replaced with Emperor Go-Horikawa, a nephew of Go-Toba.

== See also ==
- Military history of Japan
- Kenmu Restoration
