= Battle of Uji =

Battle of Uji refers to one of three 12th and 13th century battles fought in Japan:

- Battle of Uji (1180), First Battle of Uji
- Battle of Uji (1184), Second Battle of Uji
- Battle of Uji (1221), Third Battle of Uji
