= Shogun =

Military rulers and nobility of Japan (1185–1868)

Shōgun (将軍, shōgun; English: /ˈʃoʊ.ɡʌn/ SHOH-gun, Japanese: [ɕò̞ó̞.ɡɯ̈́ɴ́, -ŋɯ̈́ɴ́, ɕó̞ó̞-]), officially sei-i taishōgun (征夷大将軍; Japanese: [sé̞ì.ì | tä̀í.ɕó̞ò̞.ɡɯ̈̀ɴ̀, sé̞è̞-, -ŋɯ̈̀ɴ̀] lit. 'Commander-in-Chief of expelling the Barbarians'), was the title of the military rulers of Japan during most of the period spanning from 1185 to 1868. Nominally appointed by the Emperor, shoguns were usually the de facto rulers of the country, except during parts of the Kamakura period and Sengoku period when the shoguns themselves were figureheads, with real power in the hands of the shikken (執権) of the Hōjō clan and kanrei (管領) of the Hosokawa clan. In addition, Taira no Kiyomori, Oda Nobunaga and Toyotomi Hideyoshi were leaders of the warrior class who did not hold the position of shogun, the highest office of the warrior class, yet gained the positions of daijō-daijin (太政大臣, Chancellor of the Realm), udaijin (右大臣, Minister of the Right) and kampaku (関白, Imperial Regent) respectively, the highest offices of the aristocratic class. As such, they ran their governments as its de facto rulers.

The office of shogun was in practice hereditary, although over the course of the history of Japan several different clans held the position. The title was originally held by military commanders during the Heian period in the eighth and ninth centuries. When Minamoto no Yoritomo gained political ascendency over Japan in 1185, the title was revived to regularize his position, making him the first shogun in the usually understood sense.

While the Minamoto lineage was respected as a lineage suitable for the position of shogun, the fourth and fifth shoguns of the Kamakura shogunate were from the Fujiwara lineage (although their mothers were from the Minamoto lineage), and the sixth through ninth shoguns were from the imperial lineage. Oda Nobunaga, who claimed to be a descendant of the Taira clan, was approached for the position of shogun a month before his death.

The shogun's officials were collectively referred to as the bakufu (幕府; Japanese: [bä́.kɯ̥̈.ɸɯ̈̀, bä̀.kɯ̥̈.ɸɯ̈́]) ('tent-government'). They were the ones who carried out the actual duties of administration, while the imperial court retained only nominal authority. The tent symbolized the shogun's role as the military's field commander but also denoted that such an office was meant to be temporary. Nevertheless, the institution, known in English as the shogunate (/ˈʃoʊ.ɡən.eɪt, -ət, -ɪt/ SHOH-gən-ayt, -ət, -it), persisted for nearly 700 years, ending when Tokugawa Yoshinobu relinquished the office to Emperor Meiji in 1867 as part of the Meiji Restoration. This term bakufu only began to be actively used in the 1800s to emphasize that the emperor was the legitimate ruler of the country. During the Tokugawa shogunate the shogunate was officially called kōgi (公儀).

== Etymology ==
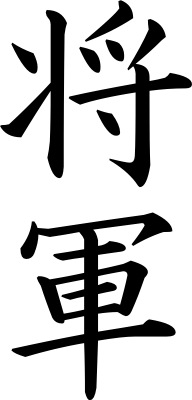
Kanji that make up the word shogun

The term shōgun (将軍; lit. 'army commander') is the abbreviation of the historical title sei-i taishōgun (征夷大将軍):

- 征 (sei, せい) means "conquer" or "subjugate", and
- 夷 (i, い) means "barbarian" or "savage" i.e. the Emishi etc. outside imperial influence;
- 大 (dai, だい) means "great";
- 将 (shō, しょう) means "commander", and
- 軍 (gun, ぐん) means "army".

Thus, a full translation of sei-i taishōgun would be 'Commander-in-Chief of the Expeditionary Force Against the Barbarians'. The term originally referred to the general who commanded the army sent to fight the tribes of northern Japan, but after the twelfth century, the term was used to designate the leader of the samurai. The term is often translated generalissimo and is also used for such military leaders of foreign nations by the Japanese.

Though shōgun (将軍) now predominantly refers to the historical position sei-i taishōgun (征夷大将軍) in Japanese, the term is generically used for the rank of general in other East Asian languages, such as Chinese (simplified Chinese: 将军; traditional Chinese: 將軍; pinyin: jiāngjūn; Jyutping: zoeng1 gwan1), in which it is secondarily used for the historical Japanese position.

In the western world, he was referred to as Tycoon. It was not until later that the proper term of Sei-i-tai or sei-i taishōgun was used.

== Titles ==
Historically, similar terms to sei-i taishōgun were used with varying degrees of responsibility, although none of them had equal or more importance than sei-i taishōgun. Some of them were:

- Seitō Taishōgun (征東大将軍; lit. "Commander-in-chief for the pacification of the East")
- Seisei Taishōgun (征西大将軍; lit. "Commander-in-chief for the pacification of the West")
- Chinjufu Shōgun (鎮守府将軍; lit. "Commander-in-chief of the central peacekeeping headquarters")
- Seiteki Taishōgun (征狄大将軍; lit. "Commander-in-chief Subjugator of the barbarians")
- Mochisetsu Taishōgun (持節大将軍; lit. "Commander-in-chief of the Temporary Office")
- Mutsu Chintōshōgun (陸奥鎮東将軍; lit. "Great General of Subduing Mutsu")

== History ==
Shoguns in the history of Japan
S#	Name	Birth/Death	Government
First shoguns
	Tajihi no Agatamori	668–737	720
	Ōtomo no Yakamochi	718?–785	784–785 Ki no Kosami in the year 789
	Ki no Kosami	733–797	789
	Ōtomo no Otomaro	731–809	794
	Sakanoue no Tamuramaro	758–811	797–811?
	Fun'ya no Watamaro	765–823	813
	Fujiwara no Tadabumi	873–947	940
	Minamoto no Yoshinaka	1154–1184	1184
Kamakura Shogunate
1	Minamoto no Yoritomo	1147–1199	1192–1199
2	Minamoto no Yoriie	1182–1204	1202–1203
3	Minamoto no Sanetomo	1192–1219	1203–1219
4	Kujō Yoritsune	1218–1256	1226–1244
5	Kujō Yoritsugu	1239–1256	1244–1252
6	Prince Munetaka	1242–1274	1252–1266
7	Prince Koreyasu	1264–1326	1266–1289
8	Prince Hisaaki	1276–1328	1289–1308
9	Prince Morikuni	1301–1333	1308–1333
Kenmu Restoration
	Prince Moriyoshi	1308–1335 He was named shogun by his father Emperor Go-Daigo in 1333	1333–1335
	Prince Nariyoshi	1326–1344?	1334–1338
Ashikaga Shogunate
1	Ashikaga Takauji	1305–1358	1338–1358
2	Ashikaga Yoshiakira	1330–1367	1358–1367
3	Ashikaga Yoshimitsu	1358–1408	1368–1394
4	Ashikaga Yoshimochi	1386–1428	1394–1423 / 1425–1428
5	Ashikaga Yoshikazu	1407–1425	1423–1425
6	Ashikaga Yoshinori	1394–1441	1428–1441
7	Ashikaga Yoshikatsu	1434–1443	1441–1443
8	Ashikaga Yoshimasa	1436–1490	1443–1473
9	Ashikaga Yoshihisa	1465–1489	1473–1489
10	Ashikaga Yoshitane	1466–1523	1489–1494
11	Ashikaga Yoshizumi	1480–1511	1494–1508
10	Ashikaga Yoshitane	1466–1523	1508–1521
12	Ashikaga Yoshiharu	1511–1550	1521–1546
13	Ashikaga Yoshiteru	1536–1565	1546–1565
14	Ashikaga Yoshihide	1538–1568	1568
15	Ashikaga Yoshiaki	1537–1597	1568–1573
Tokugawa Shogunate
1	Tokugawa Ieyasu	1542–1616	1603–1605
2	Tokugawa Hidetada	1579–1632	1605–1623
3	Tokugawa Iemitsu	1604–1651	1623–1651
4	Tokugawa Ietsuna	1641–1680	1651–1680
5	Tokugawa Tsunayoshi	1646–1709	1680–1709
6	Tokugawa Ienobu	1662–1712	1709–1712
7	Tokugawa Ietsugu	1709–1716	1713–1716
8	Tokugawa Yoshimune	1684–1751	1716–1745
9	Tokugawa Ieshige	1711–1761	1745–1760
10	Tokugawa Ieharu	1737–1786	1760–1786
11	Tokugawa Ienari	1773–1841	1787–1837
12	Tokugawa Ieyoshi	1793–1853	1837–1853
13	Tokugawa Iesada	1824–1858	1853–1858
14	Tokugawa Iemochi	1846–1866	1858–1866
15	Tokugawa Yoshinobu	1837–1913	1867–1868

=== First shogun ===
There is no consensus among the various authors since some sources consider Tajihi no Agatamori the first, others say Ōtomo no Otomaro, other sources assure that the first was Sakanoue no Tamuramaro, while others avoid the problem by just mentioning from the first Kamakura shogun Minamoto no Yoritomo. Originally, the title of sei-i taishōgun ("Commander-in-Chief of the Expeditionary Force Against the Barbarians") was given to military commanders during the early Heian period for the duration of military campaigns against the Emishi, who resisted the governance of the Kyoto-based imperial court.

=== Heian period (794–1185) ===
==== Sakanoue no Tamuramaro ====
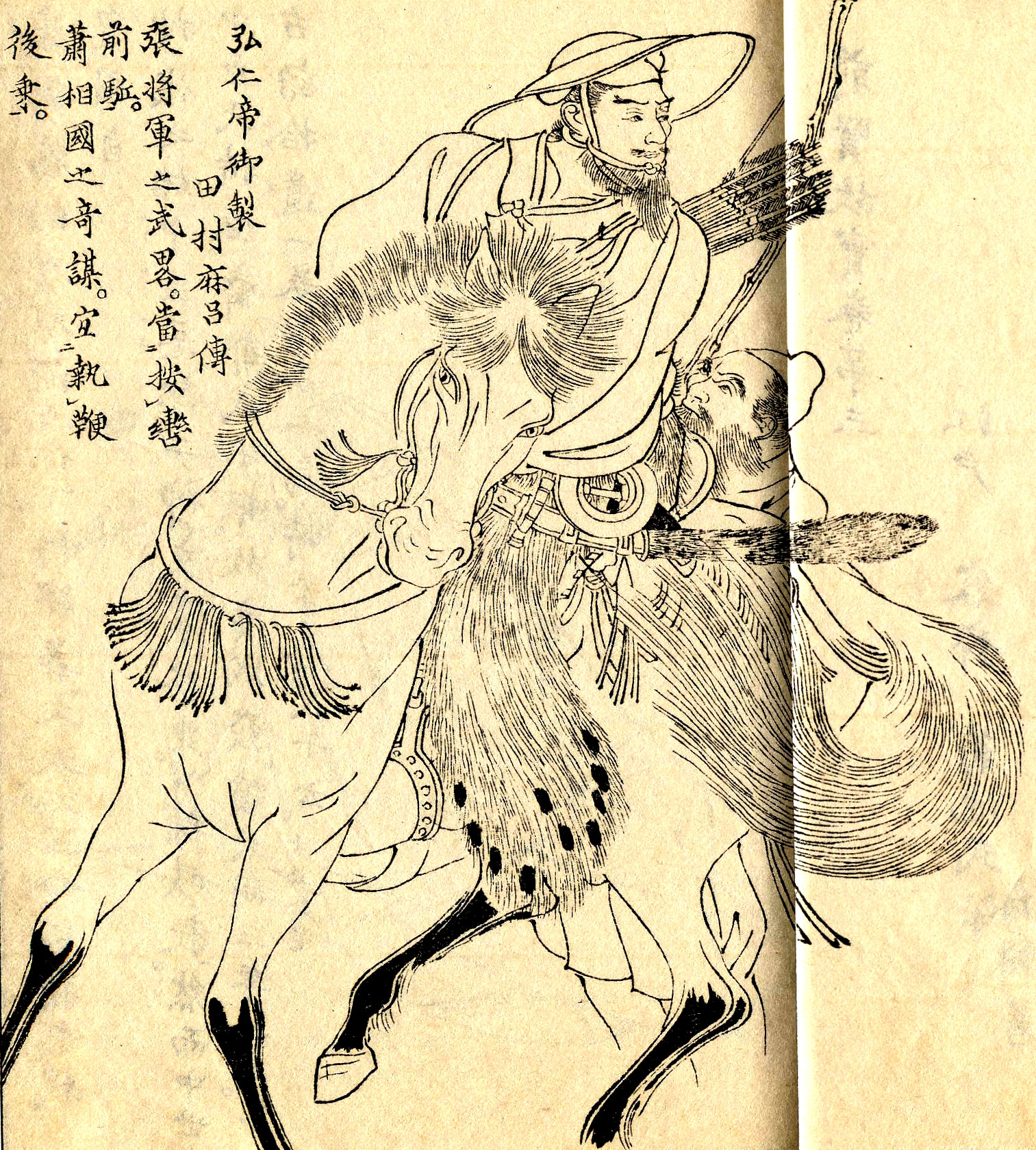
Sakanoue no Tamuramaro (758–811) was one of the first shoguns of the early Heian period.

Sakanoue no Tamuramaro (758–811) was a Japanese general who fought against the Emishi tribes of northern Japan (settled in the territory that today integrates the provinces of Mutsu and Dewa). Tamarumaro was the first general to bend these tribes, integrating their territory to that of the Yamato State. For his military feats he was named sei-i taishōgun and probably because he was the first to win the victory against the northern tribes he is generally recognized as the first shogun in history. (Note: according to historical sources Ōtomo no Otomaro also had the title of sei-i taishōgun).

==== The regency political system and cloistered rule ====
The shoguns of this period had no real political power, and the imperial court was in charge of politics. From the mid-9th century to the mid-11th century, the Fujiwara clan controlled political power. They excluded other clans from the political center and monopolized the highest positions in the court, such as sesshō (摂政, Imperial Regent for Minor Emperors), kampaku (関白, Imperial Regent for Adult Emperors), and daijō-daijin (太政大臣, Chancellor of the Realm), reaching their peak at the end of the 10th century under Fujiwara no Michinaga and Fujiwara no Yorimichi.

Later, in the mid-11th century, Emperor Go-Sanjo weakened the power of the sesshō and kampaku by presiding over politics himself, and when the next emperor, Shirakawa, abdicated and became a cloistered emperor and began a cloistered rule, the sesshō and kampaku lost their real political authority and became nominal, effectively ending the Fujiwara regime.

==== The first attempt to establish a warrior class government ====
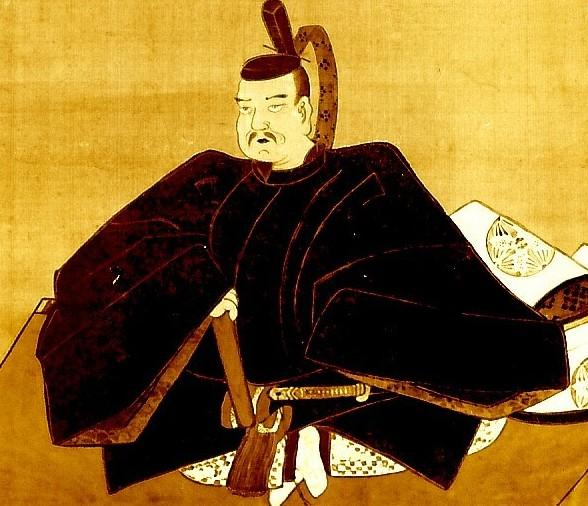
Taira no Masakado's rebellion is historically significant as the first rebellion of the warrior class and the first attempt of the warrior class to establish a government.

Taira no Masakado, who rose to prominence in the early 10th century, was the first of the local warrior class to revolt against the imperial court. He had served Fujiwara no Tadahira as a young man, but eventually won a power struggle within the Taira clan and became a powerful figure in the Kanto region. In 939, Fujiwara no Haruaki, a powerful figure in the Hitachi province, fled to Masakado. He was wanted for tyranny by Fujiwara no Korechika, a Kokushi (国司, imperial court official) who oversaw the province of Hitachi province, and Fujiwara no Korechika demanded that Masakado hand over Fujiwara no Haruaki. Masakado refused, and war broke out between Masakado and Fujiwara no Korechika, with Masakado becoming an enemy of the imperial court. Masakado proclaimed that the Kanto region under his rule was independent of the imperial court and called himself the Shinnō (新皇, New Emperor). In response, the imperial court sent a large army led by Taira no Sadamori to kill Masakado. As a result, Masakado was killed in battle in February 940. He is still revered as one of the three great onryō (怨霊, vengeful spirits) of Japan.

==== The birth of the first warrior class government ====
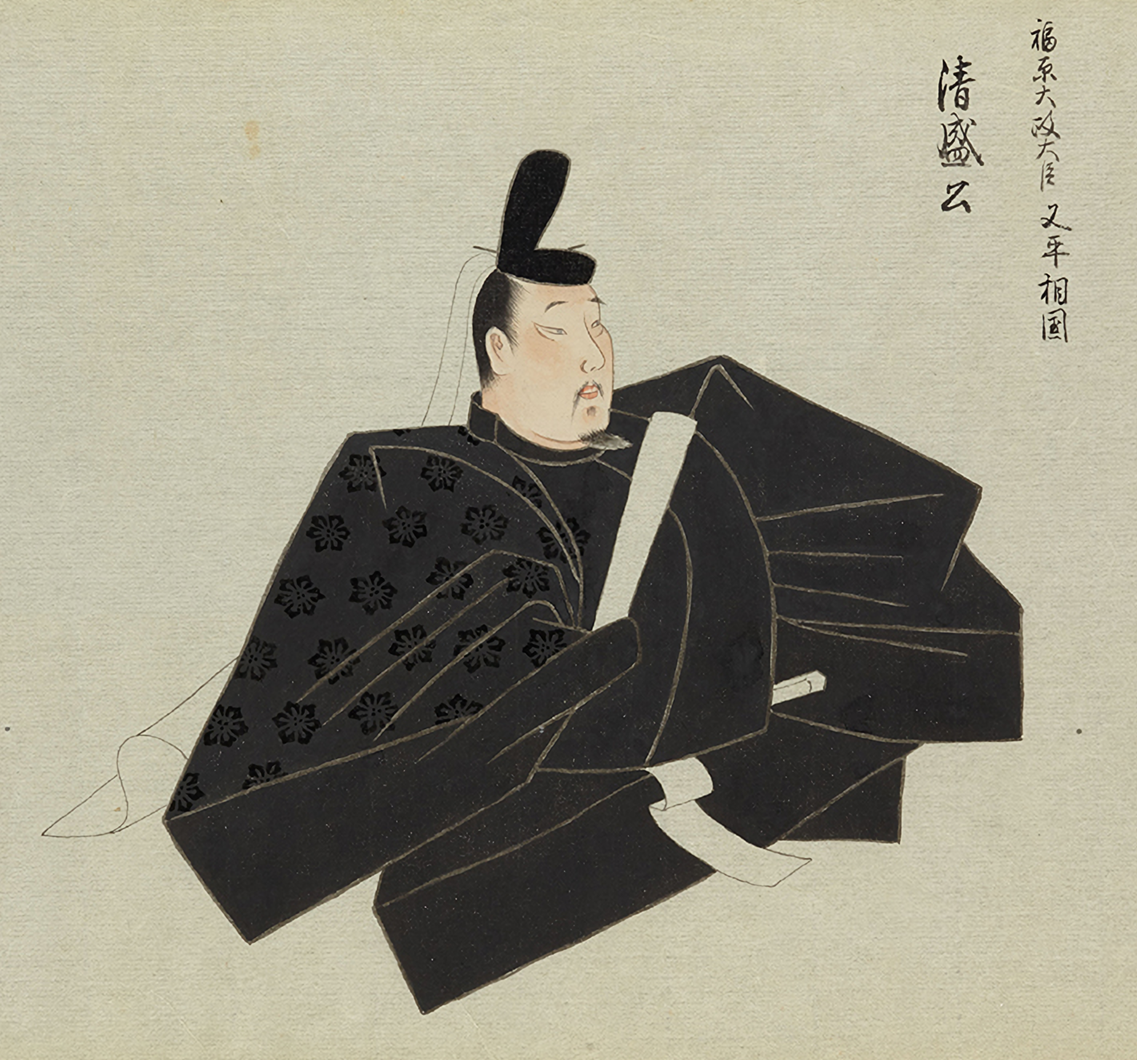
Taira no Kiyomori was the first person born of the warrior class to rise to the highest rank of nobility and the first to establish a de facto samurai government.

During the reigns of Emperor Shirakawa and Emperor Toba, the Taira clan became Kokushi (国司), or overseers of various regions, and accumulated wealth by taking samurai from various regions as their retainers. In the struggle to succeed Emperor Toba, former Emperor Sutoku and Emperor Go-Shirakawa, each with his samurai class on his side, fought the Hōgen rebellion, which was won by Emperor Go-Shirakawa, who had Taira no Kiyomori and Minamoto no Yoshitomo on his side. Later, Taira no Kiyomori defeated Minamoto no Yoshitomo in the Heiji rebellion and became the first samurai-born aristocratic class, eventually becoming daijō-daijin (太政大臣, Chancellor of the Realm), the highest position of the aristocratic class, and the Taira clan monopolized important positions at the imperial court and wielded power. The seizure of political power by Taira no Kiyomori was the first instance of the warrior class leading politics for the next 700 years.

However, when Taira no Kiyomori used his power to have the child of his daughter Taira no Tokuko and Emperor Takakura installed as Emperor Antoku, there was widespread opposition. Prince Mochihito, no longer able to assume the imperial throne, called upon the Minamoto clan to raise an army to defeat the Taira clan, and the Genpei War began. In the midst of the Genpei War, Minamoto no Yoshinaka expelled the Taira clan from Kyoto, and although initially welcomed by the hermit Emperor Go-Shirakawa, he became estranged and isolated due to the disorderly military discipline and lack of political power under his command. He staged a coup, overthrew the emperor's entourage, and became the first of the Minamoto clan to assume the office of Sei-i Taishōgun (shogun). In response, Minamoto no Yoritomo sent Minamoto no Noriyori and Minamoto no Yoshitsune to defeat Yoshinaka, who was killed within a year of becoming shogun. In 1185, the Taira clan was finally defeated in the Battle of Dan-no-ura, and the Minamoto clan came to power.

=== Kamakura shogunate (1185–1333) ===
Minamoto no Yoritomo, the first shogun (1192–1199) of the Kamakura shogunate

There are various theories as to the year in which the Kamakura period and Kamakura shogunate began. In the past, the most popular theory was that the year was 1192, when Minamoto no Yoritomo was appointed sei-i taishōgun (征夷大将軍). Later, the prevailing theory was that the year was 1185, when Yoritomo established the shugo (守護), which controlled military and police power in various regions, and the jitō (地頭), which was in charge of tax collection and land administration. Japanese history textbooks as of 2016 do not specify a specific year for the beginning of the Kamakura period, as there are various theories about the year the Kamakura shogunate was established.

Minamoto no Yoritomo seized power from the central government and aristocracy and by 1192 established a feudal system based in Kamakura in which the private military, the samurai, gained some political powers while the Emperor and the aristocracy remained the de jure rulers.

In 1192, Yoritomo was awarded the title of sei-i taishōgun by Emperor Go-Toba and the political system he developed with a succession of shoguns as the head became known as a shogunate. Hojo Masako's (Yoritomo's wife) family, the Hōjō, seized power from the Kamakura shoguns.

In 1199, Yoritomo died suddenly at the age of 53, and the 18-year-old Minamoto no Yoriie took over as second shogun. To support the young Yoriie, the decisions of the shogunate were made by a 13-man council, including Hojo Tokimasa and his son Hojo Yoshitoki, but this was effectively dismantled shortly afterwards when one of the key members lost his political position and two others died of illness.

==== Puppetization of the shogun by the shikken ====
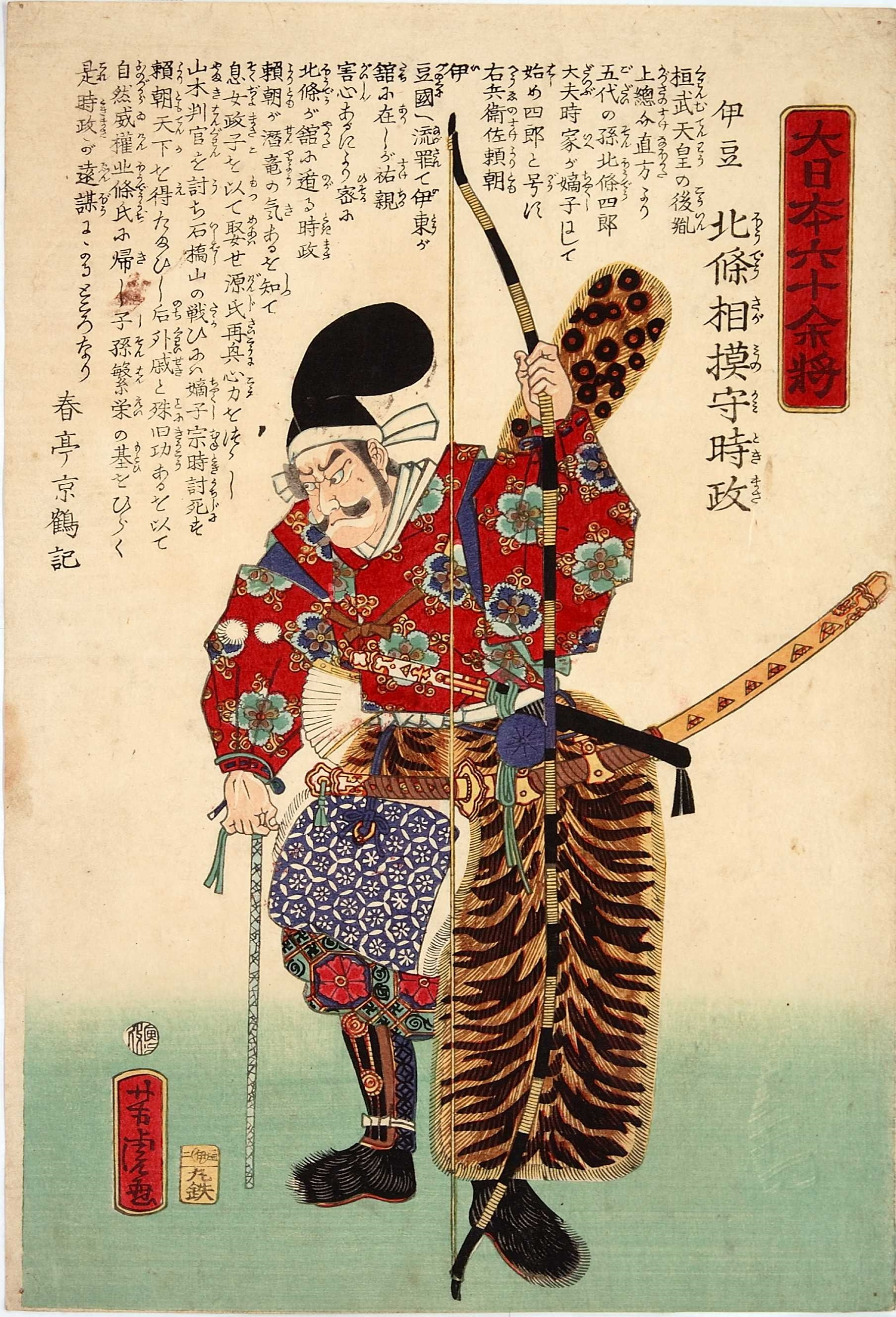
Hōjō Tokimasa shifted the source of power in the shogunate from the shogun to the shogun's assistant, shikken, and established the rule of the Hōjō clan.

When Minamoto no Yoriie fell ill in 1203, a power struggle broke out between the Hojo clan and Hiki Yoshikazu, and Hojo Tokimasa destroyed the Hiki clan. Tokimasa then installed the 12-year-old Minamoto no Sanetomo as the third shogun, puppeting him while himself becoming the first shikken (執権, Regent) and assuming actual control of the shogunate. Hojo Yoshitoki later assassinated Minamoto no Yoriie.

However, Hojo Tokimasa lost influence in 1204 when he killed Hatakeyama Shigetada, believing false information that his son-in-law Shigetada was about to rebel, and lost his position in 1205 when he tried to install his son-in-law Hiraga Tomomasa as the fourth shogun. Hojo Yoshitoki became the second shikken, and the shogunate was administered under the leadership of Hojo Masako.

In 1219, the third shogun, Minamoto no Sanetomo, was assassinated for unknown reasons.

In 1221, war broke out for the first time in Japan between the warrior class government and the imperial court, and in this battle, known as the Jōkyū War, the shogunate defeated former Emperor Go-Toba. The shogunate exiled former Emperor Go-Toba to Oki Island for waging war against the shogunate. The shogunate learned its lesson and set up an administrative body in Kyoto called the Rokuhara Tandai (六波羅探題) to oversee the imperial court and western Japan.

After the sudden death of Hojo Yoshitoki in 1224, Hojo Yasutoki became the third shikken, and after the death of Hojo Masako in 1225, the administration of the shogunate returned to a council system.

In 1226, Hojo Yasutoki installed Kujo Yoritsune, a member of the sekkan family, as the fourth shogun.

In 1232, the Goseibai Shikimoku was enacted, the first codified law by a warrior class government in Japan.

==== Puppetization of the shogun by the tokusō ====
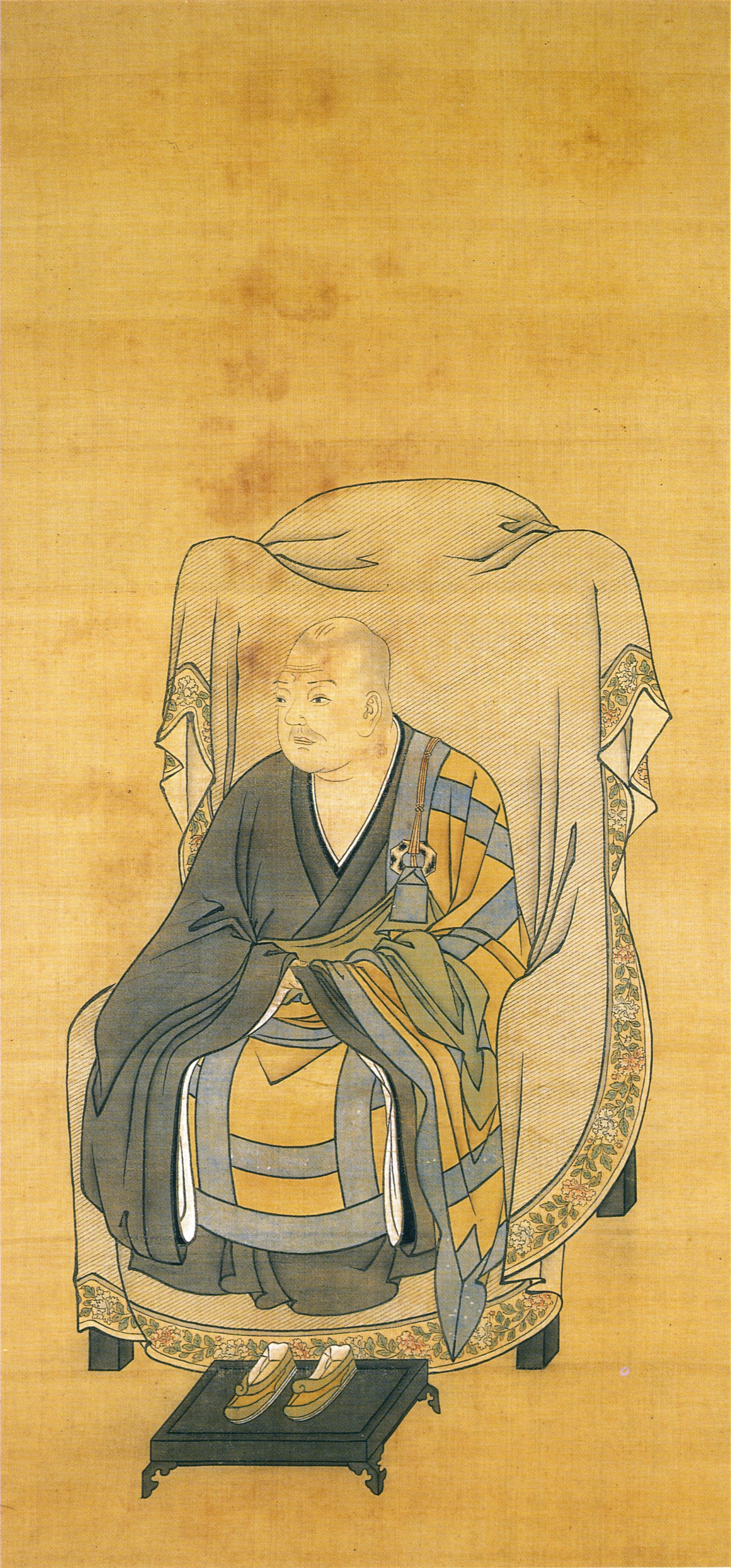
Hōjō Tokiyori shifted the source of power in the shogunate from the official position of shikken to the private title of tokusō of the Hojo clan.

In 1246, Hojo Tokiyori became the fifth shikken, and in 1252 he installed Prince Munetaka as the sixth shogun. The appointment of a member of the imperial family as shogun made the shogun more and more like a puppet. After retiring from the shikkens, he used his position as head of the Hojo clan's main family, tokusō (得宗), to dominate politics, thus shifting the source of power in the shogunate from the shikken to tokusō.

During the reign of Hojo Tokimune, the eighth shikken and seventh tokusō, the shogunate twice defeated the Mongol invasion of Japan in 1274 and 1281. The shogunate defeated the Mongols with the help of samurai called gokenin (御家人), lords in the service of the shogunate. However, since the war was a war of national defense and no new territory was gained, the shogunate was unable to adequately reward the gokenin, and their dissatisfaction with the shogunate grew.

In 1285, during the reign of Hojo Sadatoki, the ninth shikken and eighth tokusō, Adachi Yasumori and his clan, who had been the main vassals of the Kamakura shogunate, were destroyed by Taira no Yoritsuna, further strengthening the ruling system of the tokusō, which emphasized blood relations. As tokusō's ruling system was strengthened, the power of the title of naikanrei (内管領), tokusō's chief retainer, increased, and when tokusō was young or incapacitated, naikanrei took control of the shogunate. Taira no Yoritsuna during the reign of Hojo Sadatoki, and Nagasaki Takatsuna and Nagasaki Takasuke during the reign of Hojo Takatoki, the fourteenth shikken and ninth tokusō, were naikanrei who took control of the Kamakura shogunate. In other words, Japanese politics was a multiple puppet structure: Emperor, shogun, shikken, tokusō, and naikanrei.

In response to gokenin's dissatisfaction with the shogunate, Emperor Go-Daigo planned to raise an army against the shogunate, but his plan was leaked and he was exiled to Oki Island in 1331. In 1333, Emperor Go-Daigo escaped from Oki Island and again called on gokenin and samurai to raise an army against the shogunate. Kusunoki Masashige was the first to respond to the call, sparking a series of rebellions against the shogunate in various places. Ashikaga Takauji, who had been ordered by the shogunate to suppress the forces of Emperor Go-Daigo, turned to the emperor's side and attacked Rokuhara Tandai. Then, in 1333, Nitta Yoshisada invaded Kamakura and the Kamakura shogunate fell, and the Hōjō clan was destroyed.

=== Kenmu Restoration (1333–1336) ===
Around 1334–1336, Ashikaga Takauji helped Emperor Go-Daigo regain his throne in the Kenmu Restoration.

Emperor Go-Daigo rejected cloistered rule and the shogunate and abolished the sesshō and kampaku in favour of an emperor-led government. He also began building a new palace and established four new administrative bodies. However, the nobles who had long been out of politics and the newly appointed samurai were unfamiliar with administrative practices, and the court was unable to handle the drastic increase in lawsuits. Emperor Go-Daigo gave high positions and rewards only to the nobles, and the warriors began to swear allegiance to Ashikaga Takauji, who was willing to give up his personal fortune to give them such rewards.

During the Kenmu Restoration, after the fall of the Kamakura shogunate in 1333, another short-lived shogun arose. Prince Moriyoshi (Morinaga), son of Go-Daigo, was awarded the title of sei-i taishōgun. However, Prince Moriyoshi was later put under house arrest and, in 1335, killed by Ashikaga Tadayoshi.

Emperor Go-daigo did not like the growing fame of Ashikaga Takauji and ordered Nitta Yoshisada and others to defeat Ashikaga Takauji. In response, Takauji led a group of samurai against the new government and defeated the imperial court forces. This ended Emperor Go-Daigo's new regime in 1336 after only two years.

=== Ashikaga (Muromachi) shogunate (1336/1338–1573) ===
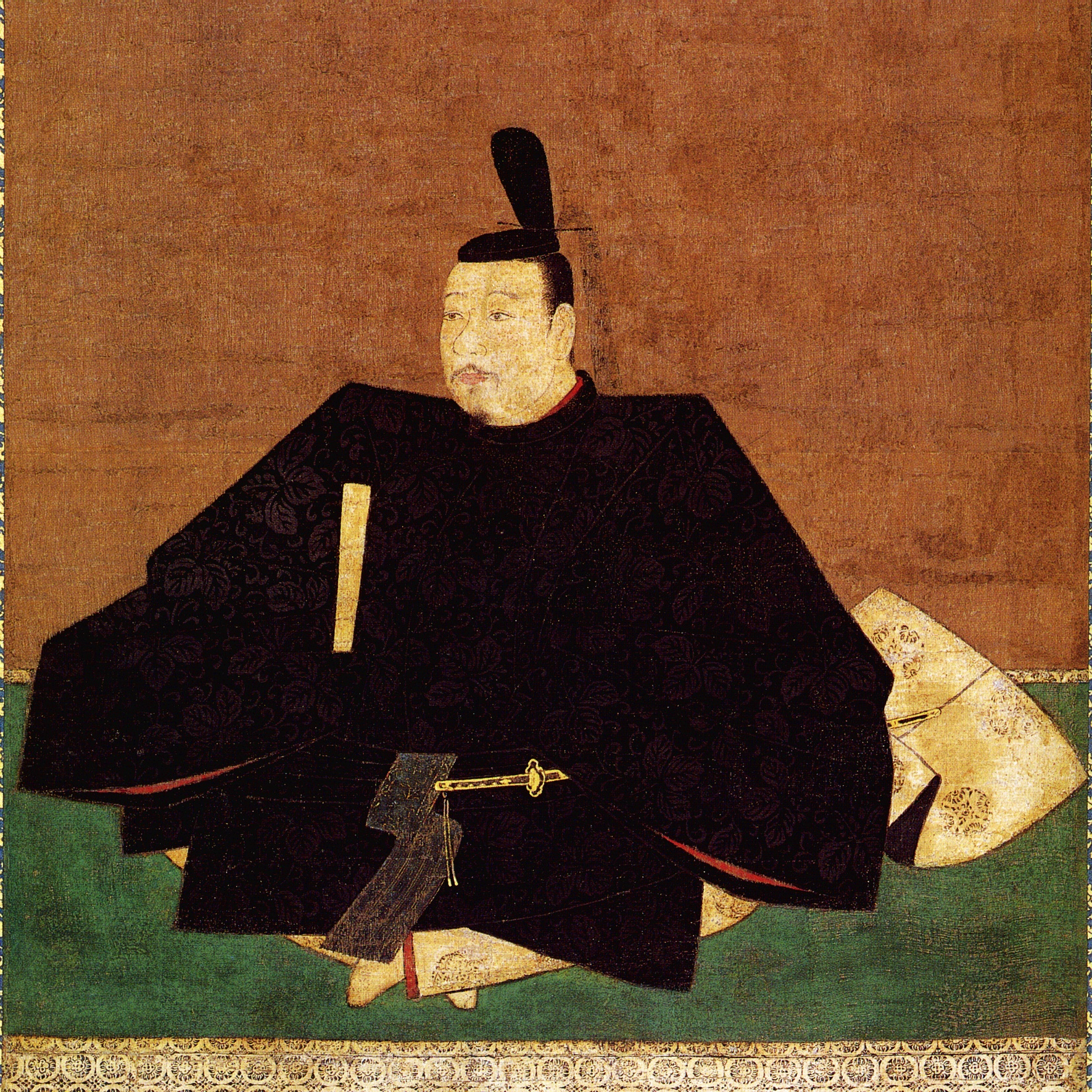
Ashikaga Takauji (1336/1338–1358) established the Ashikaga shogunate.

After the failure of the Kenmu Restoration, Emperor Go-Daigo fled to Enryaku-ji Temple on Mount Hiei with the Three Sacred Treasures (Imperial regalia, 三種の神器). On the other hand, Ashikaga Takauji installed Emperor Kōmyō as the new emperor without the Three Sacred Treasures in 1336.

Ashikaga Takauji tried to make peace with Emperor Go-Daigo, but the negotiations failed when Emperor Go-Daigo refused. Emperor Go-Daigo moved to Yoshino, and the country entered the Nanboku-cho period (1336–1392), in which two emperors existed at the same time in two different imperial courts, the Southern Court in Yoshino and the Northern Court in Kyoto.

In 1338, Ashikaga Takauji, like Minamoto no Yoritomo, a descendant of the Minamoto princes, was awarded the title of sei-i taishōgun by Emperor Kōmyō and established the Ashikaga shogunate, which nominally lasted until 1573. The Ashikaga had their headquarters in the Muromachi district of Kyoto, and the time during which they ruled is also known as the Muromachi period.

Between 1346 and 1358, the Ashikaga shogunate gradually expanded the authority of the shugo (守護), the local military and police officials established by the Kamakura shogunate, giving the shugo jurisdiction over land disputes between gokenin (御家人) and allowing the shugo to receive half of all taxes from the areas they controlled. The shugo shared their newfound wealth with the local samurai, creating a hierarchical relationship between the shugo and the samurai, and the first early daimyo (大名, feudal lords), called shugo daimyo (守護大名), appeared.

Ashikaga Yoshimitsu, the third shogun, negotiated peace with the Southern court, and in 1392 he reunited the two courts by absorbing the Southern court, ending the 58-year Nanboku-cho period. Yoshimitsu continued to hold power after passing the shogunate to his son Ashikaga Yoshimochi in 1395, becoming daijō-daijin (太政大臣, Chancellor of the Realm), the highest rank of the nobility, and remaining in power until his death in 1408.

In 1428, Ashikaga Yoshimochi, the fourth shogun, was ill and the question of his succession arose. Ashikaga Yoshikazu, the 5th shogun, died of illness at the age of 19, so the 6th shogun was chosen from among Yoshimochi's four brothers, and to ensure fairness, a lottery was held. The sixth shogun was Ashikaga Yoshinori. However, he was not educated to be a shogun, and his temperamental and despotic behavior caused resentment, and he was assassinated by Akamatsu Mitsusuke during the Kakitsu Rebellion. This led to instability in the Ashikaga shogunate system.

==== Ōnin war and Sengoku period ====
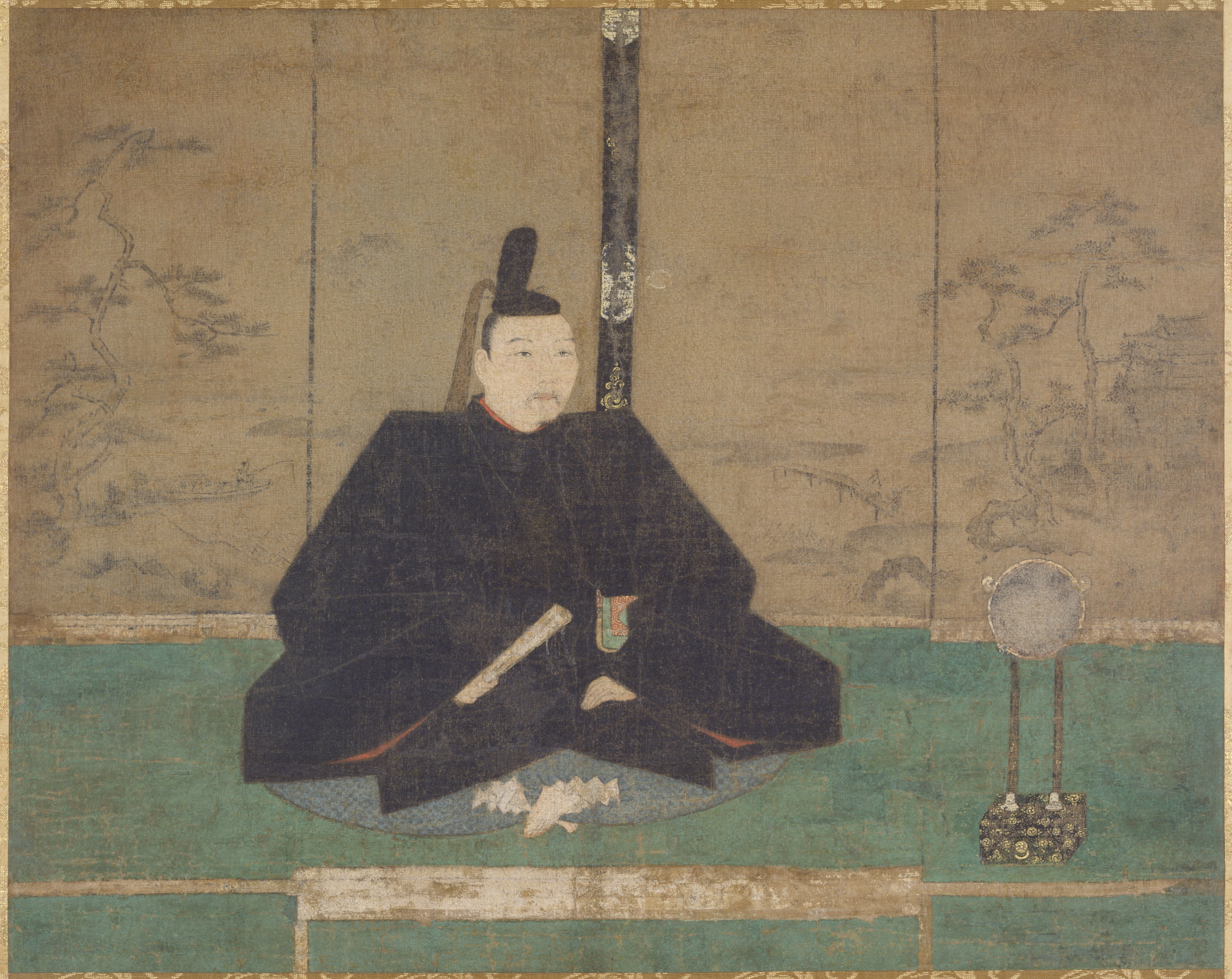
Ashikaga Yoshimasa

Ashikaga Yoshimasa, the 8th shogun, tried to strengthen the power of the shogun, but his close associates did not follow his instructions, leading to political chaos and increasing social unrest. Since he had no sons, he tried to install his younger brother Ashikaga Yoshimi as the ninth shogun, but when his wife Hino Tomiko gave birth to Ashikaga Yoshihisa, a conflict arose among the shugo daimyo as to whether Yoshimi or Yoshihisa would be the next shogun. The Hatakeyama and Shiba clans were also divided into two opposing factions over succession within their own clans, and Hosokawa Katsumoto and Yamana Sōzen, who were father-in-law and son-in-law, were politically at odds with each other.

In 1467, these conflicts finally led to the Ōnin War between the Eastern Army, led by Hosokawa Katsumoto and including Hatakeyama Masanaga, Shiba Yoshitoshi, and Ashikaga Yoshimi, and the Western Army, led by Yamana Sōzen and including Hatakeyama Yoshinari, Shiba Yoshikado, and Ashikaga Yoshihisa. In 1469, the war spread to the provinces, but in 1473, Hosokawa Katsumoto and Yamana Sōzen, the leaders of both armies, were dead, and in 1477, the war ended when the western lords, including Hatakeyama Yoshinari and Ōuchi Masahiro, withdrew their armies from Kyoto.

The war devastated Kyoto, destroying many aristocratic and samurai residences, Shinto shrines, and Buddhist temples, and undermining the authority of the Ashikaga shoguns, greatly reducing their control over the various regions. Thus began the Sengoku period, a period of civil war in which the daimyo of various regions fought to expand their own power. Daimyo who became more powerful as the shogunate's control weakened were called sengoku daimyo (戦国大名), and they often came from shugo daimyo, shugodai (守護代, deputy shugo), and kokujin or kunibito (国人, local masters). In other words, sengoku daimyo differed from shugo daimyo in that sengoku daimyo was able to rule the region on his own, without being appointed by the shogun.

In 1492, Hosokawa Masamoto, the kanrei (管領), second in rank to the shogun in the Ashikaga shogunate, and the equivalent of Shikken (執権) in the Kamakura shogunate, staged a coup, banished the 10th shogun, Ashikaga Yoshitane, from Kyoto, and installed Ashikaga Yoshizumi as the 11th shogun, making the shogun a puppet of the Hosokawa clan. Hosokawa Takakuni, who came to power later, installed Ashikaga Yoshiharu as the 12th shogun in 1521. In 1549, Miyoshi Nagayoshi banished the 12th shogun and his son Ashikaga Yoshiteru from Kyoto and seized power. From this point on, the Miyoshi clan continued to hold power in and around Kyoto until Oda Nobunaga entered Kyoto in 1568.

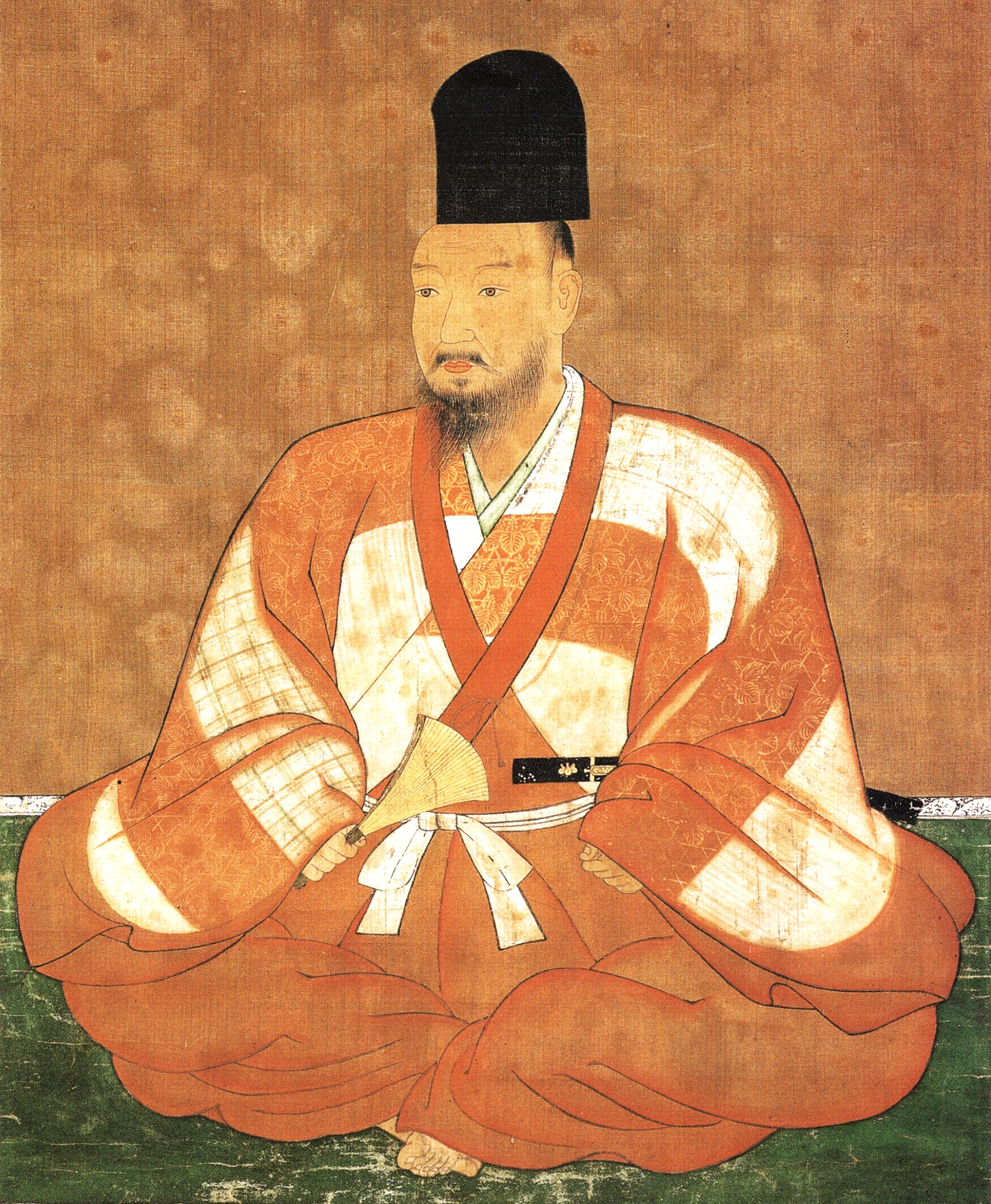
Ashikaga Yoshiteru, famous as a great swordsman

By the time of the 13th shogun, Ashikaga Yoshiteru, the shogun already had few direct fiefs and direct military forces, and his sphere of influence was limited to a few lands around Kyoto, losing both economic and military power. As a result, Ashikaga Yoshiteru was often chased out of Kyoto by the sengoku daimyo Miyoshi Nagayoshi and his forces, and was finally killed in an attack by the forces of Miyoshi Yoshitsugu and Matsunaga Hisahide. Ashikaga Yoshiteru was known as a great swordsman and was a student of Tsukahara Bokuden, who was known as one of the strongest swordsmen. According to Yagyū Munenori, a swordsmanship instructor in the Tokugawa Shogunate, Ashikaga Yoshiteru was one of the five best swordsmen of his time. According to several historical books, including Luís Fróis' Historia de Japam, he fought hard with naginata and tachi during a raid, defeating many of his enemies, but eventually ran out of strength and was killed.

=== Azuchi–Momoyama period (1573–1603) ===
The Azuchi-Momoyama period refers to the period when Oda Nobunaga and Toyotomi Hideyoshi were in power. They and Tokugawa Ieyasu are the three unifiers of Japan. The name "Azuchi-Momoyama" comes from the fact that Nobunaga's castle, Azuchi Castle, was located in Azuchi, Shiga, and Fushimi Castle, where Hideyoshi lived after his retirement, was located in Momoyama. Although the two leaders of the warrior class during this period were not given the title of sei-i taishōgun (征夷大将軍, shogun), Oda Nobunaga was given a title almost equal to it, and Toyotomi Hideyoshi a higher one.

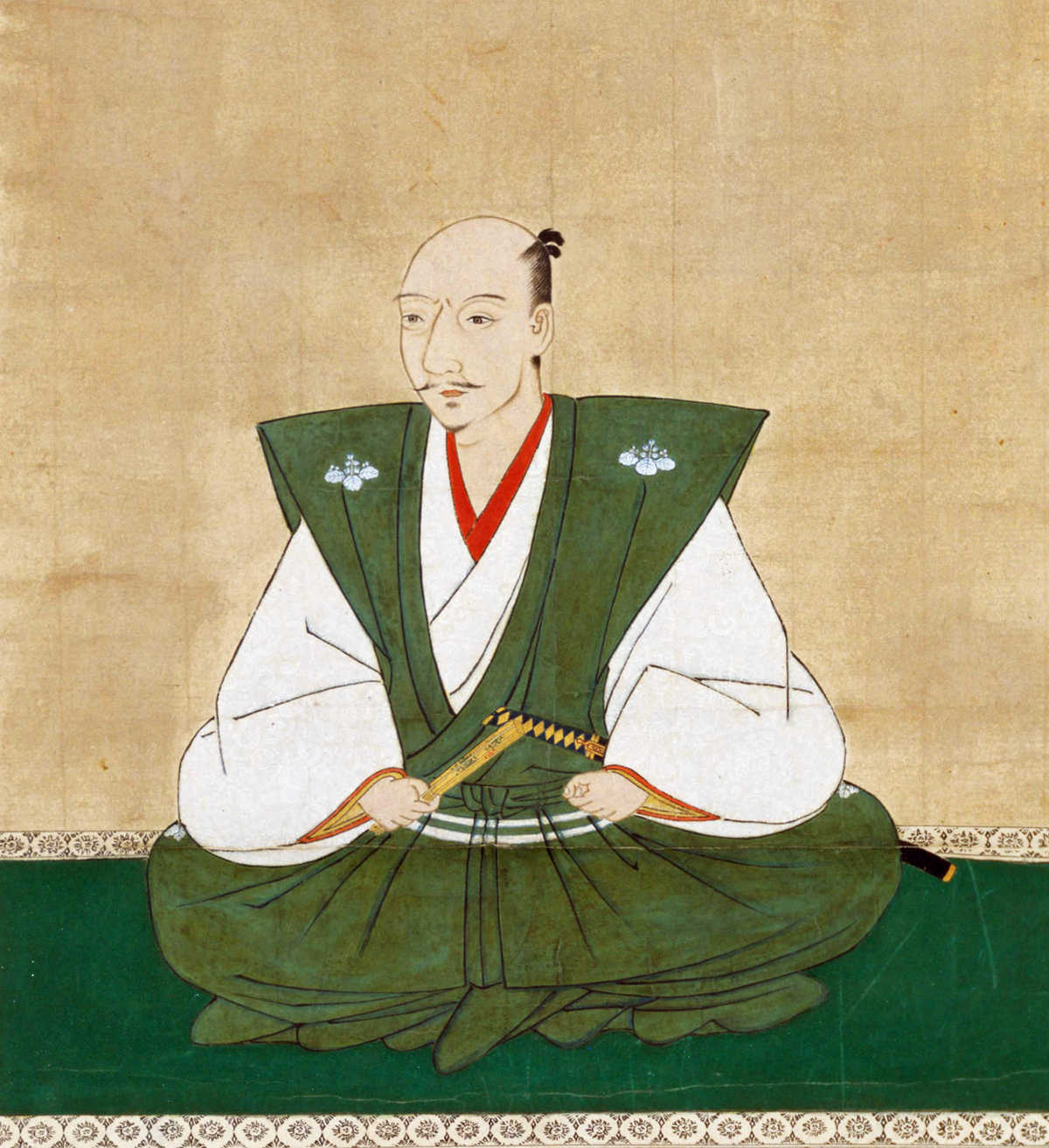
Oda Nobunaga was the first of the three unifiers of Japan.

This era began when Oda Nobunaga expelled Ashikaga Yoshiaki from Kyoto and destroyed the Ashikaga shogunate. Adopting an innovative military strategy using tanegashima (種子島, matchlock gun) and an economic policy that encouraged economic activity by the common people, he rapidly expanded his power, defeating a series of sengoku daimyo and armed Buddhist temple forces to unify the central part of Japan.

Nobunaga was given the title of udaijin (右大臣, Minister of the Right), an official position as the number three in the imperial court since ancient times, and the title of ukon'e no taishō (右近衛大将, Major Captain of the Right Division of Inner Palace Guards), which meant leader of the warrior class. This title was a highly prestigious title given to the leader of the warrior class, similar to the title sei-i taishōgun (征夷大将軍, shogun). This was the first time since Minamoto no Sanetomo in 1218 that a member of the warrior class had been appointed udaijin. Previously, the only warrior class members appointed to higher positions than udaijin were Taira no Kiyomori and Ashikaga Yoshimitsu as daijō-daijin (太政大臣, Chancellor of the Realm), and Ashikaga Yoshinori and Ashikaga Yoshimasa as sadaijin (左大臣, Minister of the Left). Nobunaga was betrayed by his vassal Akechi Mitsuhide, and died in the Honnō-ji incident. It is believed that about a month before his death, Nobunaga was approached by the imperial court to accept one of the following positions: kampaku (関白, Imperial Regent), daijō-daijin, or shogun. As a result, he was posthumously promoted to daijō-daijin in 1582.

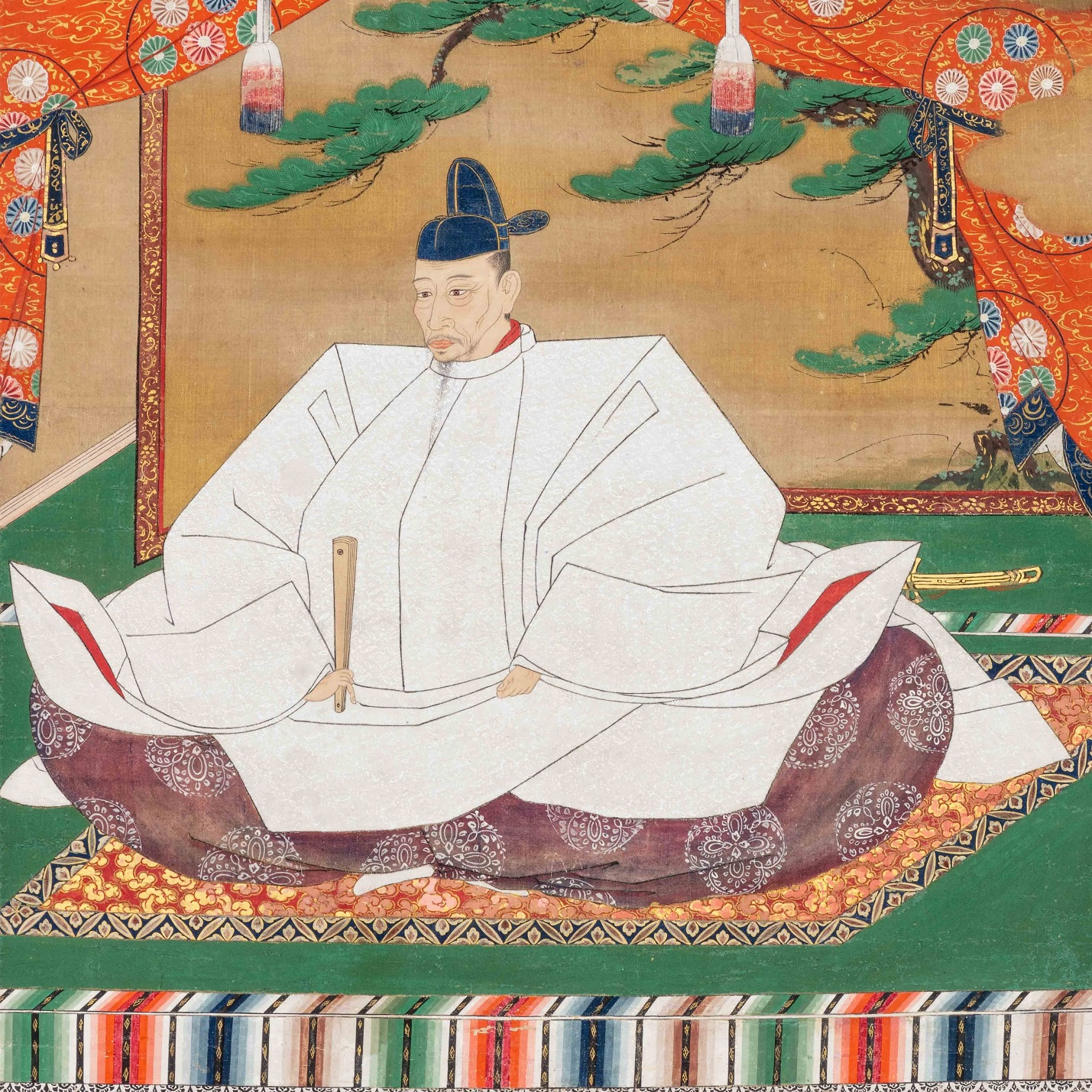
Toyotomi Hideyoshi became the leader of the warrior class and earned the highest title of the aristocratic class, but he did not hold the title of shogun, the highest title of the warrior class.

Toyotomi Hideyoshi, a general under Nobunaga, conquered Shikoku, Kyushu, Kantō, and the Tohoku after Nobunaga's death, completing Nobunaga's attempt to unify Japan. Despite his peasant background, he rose through the ranks under Nobunaga, becoming ashigaru (足軽, infantry), samurai, sengoku daimyo, and finally, after Nobunaga's death, kampaku and daijō-daijin. It was the first time in history that a non-aristocrat by birth became a kampaku. He obtained these titles, the highest ranks of the aristocracy, by being adopted into the Konoe family and formally becoming an aristocrat. He then passed the position and title of kampaku to his nephew, Toyotomi Hidetsugu. He remained in power as taikō (太閤), the title of retired kampaku, until his death. There are various theories as to why he refused or failed to receive the title of shogun, but the fact that he came from a peasant background seems to have had something to do with it. Hideyoshi died of illness at Fushimi Castle at the age of 63.

Before his death, Hideyoshi ordered that Japan be ruled by a council of the five most powerful sengoku daimyo, go-tairō (五大老, Council of Five Elders), and Hideyoshi's five retainers, go-bugyō (五奉行, Five Commissioners), until his only heir, the five-year-old Toyotomi Hideyori, reached the age of 16. However, having only the young Hideyori as Hideyoshi's successor weakened the Toyotomi regime. Today, the loss of all of Hideyoshi's adult heirs is considered the main reason for the downfall of the Toyotomi clan. Hideyoshi's younger brother, Toyotomi Hidenaga, who had supported Hideyoshi's rise to power as a leader and strategist, had already died of illness in 1591, and his nephew, Toyotomi Hidetsugu, who was Hideyoshi's only adult successor, was forced to commit seppuku in 1595 along with many other vassals on Hideyoshi's orders for suspected rebellion.

In this politically unstable situation, Maeda Toshiie, one of the go-tairō, died of illness, and Tokugawa Ieyasu, one of the go-tairō' who had been second in power to Hideyoshi but had not participated in the Imjin War, rose to power, and Ieyasu came into conflict with Ishida Mitsunari, one of the go-bukyō and others. This conflict eventually led to the Battle of Sekigahara, in which the tō-gun (東軍, eastern army) led by Ieyasu defeated the sei-gun (西軍, western army) led by Mitsunari, and Ieyasu nearly gained control of Japan.

=== Tokugawa shogunate (1603–1868) ===
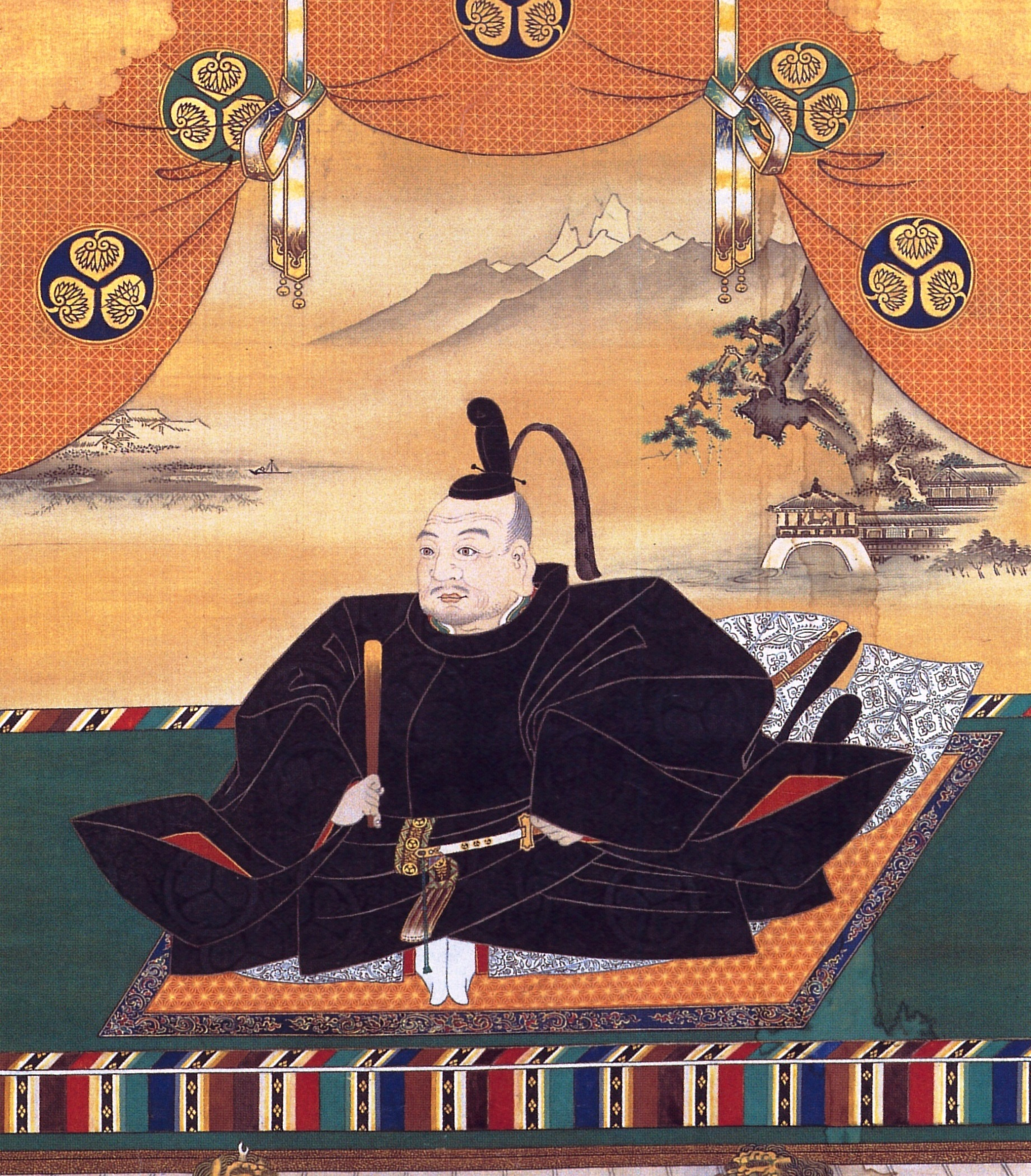
Tokugawa Ieyasu, founder of the Tokugawa shogunate

Ruled by 15 Tokugawa shoguns, the Edo period (1603–1868) saw dramatic economic and cultural development, fostered by a relatively peaceful society. Edo (now Tokyo) became the largest city in the world at the time, Genroku and Kasei cultures flourished, and chōnin (町人, townspeople) enjoyed a variety of cultural activities such as ukiyo-e, kabuki, bunraku, rakugo, kōdan, haiku, and literature.

The Edo period began in 1603 when Tokugawa Ieyasu was given the title of sei-i taishōgun (征夷大将軍, shogun) and established the Tokugawa shogunate in Edo (now Tokyo). Ieyasu set a precedent in 1605 when he retired as shogun in favour of his son Tokugawa Hidetada, though he maintained power from behind the scenes as Ōgosho (大御所, cloistered shogun).

In order to establish the rule of the Tokugawa shogunate, he exchanged the fiefdoms of various daimyo to increase or decrease their areas of control. The fudai daimyo (譜代大名) who had sided with Tokugawa Ieyasu before the Battle of Sekigahara were reassigned to various locations between Edo, the base of the Tokugawa shogunate, and Osaka, where Toyotomi Hideyoshi's concubine, Yodo-dono, and his son, Toyotomi Hideyori, were located. On the other hand, he reassigned the tozama daimyo (外様大名) who had submitted to Tokugawa Ieyasu after the Battle of Sekigahara, to remote areas separated from politically important regions. Then, in 1614 and 1615, he twice attacked Osaka Castle, forcing Yodo-dono and Toyotomi Hideyori to commit suicide and destroying the Toyotomi clan (Siege of Osaka), thereby eliminating any resistance that might have stood in the way of Tokugawa rule in Japan and consolidating the power of the Tokugawa shogunate.

In 1615, the Tokugawa shogunate enacted the Kinchu narabini kuge shohatto (禁中並公家諸法度, Laws for the Imperial and Court Officials) to control the imperial court. The first article implied that the emperor should not be involved in politics and that what he did should be academic. The following articles regulated the appointment of the sesshō (摂政, Imperial Regent for Minor Emperors) and kampaku (関白, Imperial Regent for Adult Emperors), as well as detailed regulations on the dress of the emperor and the court nobles. It also stipulated that the shogunate could intervene in the revision of the era name, which had originally been the prerogative of the imperial court. It also stipulated that nobles could be exiled if they disobeyed the orders of the shogunate. During the Edo period, effective power rested with the Tokugawa shogun, not the Emperor in Kyoto, even though the former ostensibly owed his position to the latter. The shogun controlled foreign policy, the military, and feudal patronage. The role of the Emperor was ceremonial, similar to the position of the Japanese monarchy after the Second World War.

In 1617, a month before his death, Ieyasu was appointed daijō-daijin (太政大臣, Chancellor of the Realm).

The fifth shogun, Tokugawa Tsunayoshi, enforced an animal protection law called the Shōrui awaremi no rei (生類憐みの令) from 1685 to 1709. According to earlier theories, this was a bad law that demanded extreme animal protection and severe punishment for violators. Today, however, the law is seen as less extreme and more protective of human life, and is credited with sweeping away the rough and tumble spirit of the people that had persisted since the Sengoku period and improving the sense of ethics among the Japanese people.

Tokugawa Yoshimune

In the early Edo period, Japan was the world's largest producer of gold and silver, but by the second half of the 17th century, these resources had been almost completely depleted, and most of the gold and silver produced was shipped out of the country, leaving the shogunate in financial difficulties. The eighth shogun, Tokugawa Yoshimune, implemented a series of reforms known as the Kyōhō Reforms. He reduced the shogunate's expenses while increasing revenue by requiring feudal lords to contribute rice to the shogunate in exchange for cutting the length of sankin-kōtai (参勤交代) in half. He increased the revenue of the shogunate by 20% by encouraging the development of new rice fields. He also encouraged the cultivation of cash crops such as sweet potatoes and sugar cane, which allowed agriculture to flourish and increased tax revenues. He issued new money with a reduced gold content to prevent price increases. He learned from the Great Fire of Meireki, which killed 100,000 people, and built extensive roads and firebreaks around the city. He established a meyasubako (目安箱, complaints box) to receive petitions from the common people, which led to the formation of a firefighting organization by the townspeople and the establishment of a Koishikawa Yojosho (Koishikawa Hospital) where the common people could receive medical care.

Tanuma Okitsugu, who held the position of rōjū (老中, Elder), during the reign of Tokugawa Ieharu, the 10th shogun, adopted a policy of mercantilism. Since the Kyōhō Reforms of Tokugawa Yoshimune had already made it impossible to collect more taxes from the peasants, Okitsugu began collecting taxes in exchange for granting exclusive business rights to the kabunakama (株仲間, merchant guilds). To stimulate commerce, he also attempted to unify the monetary system by minting a large number of new coins that could be conveniently used in both eastern Japan, where gold coins were widely used, and western Japan, where silver coins were widely used, and distributing them throughout Japan.

Tokugawa Ienari, the 11th shogun, ruled the shogunate for 54 years, first as shogun from 1787 to 1837 and then as Ōgosho from 1837 to 1841. His 50-year reign was the longest of any shogun. Prior to his reign, Japan had suffered major earthquakes, several volcanic eruptions, droughts, floods and urban fires, and the finances of the shogunate were strained. Therefore, during Ienari's reign, from 1787 to 1793, Matsudaira Sadanobu led the Kansei Reforms to improve the finances of the shogunate. After Ienari's death, from 1841 to 1843, Mizuno Tadakuni led the Tenpo Reforms, but the effects of these reforms were limited.

Successive shoguns held the highest or near-highest court ranks, higher than most court nobles. They were made Shō ni-i (正二位, Senior Second Rank) of court rank upon assuming office, then Ju ichi-i (従一位, Junior First Rank), and the highest rank of Shō ichi-i (正一位, Senior First Rank) was conferred upon them upon their death. The Tokugawa shogunate established that the court ranks granted to daimyo by the imperial court were based on the recommendation of the Tokugawa shogunate, and the court ranks were used to control the daimyo.

==== The Bakumatsu era and the end of the shogunate and the warrior class ====
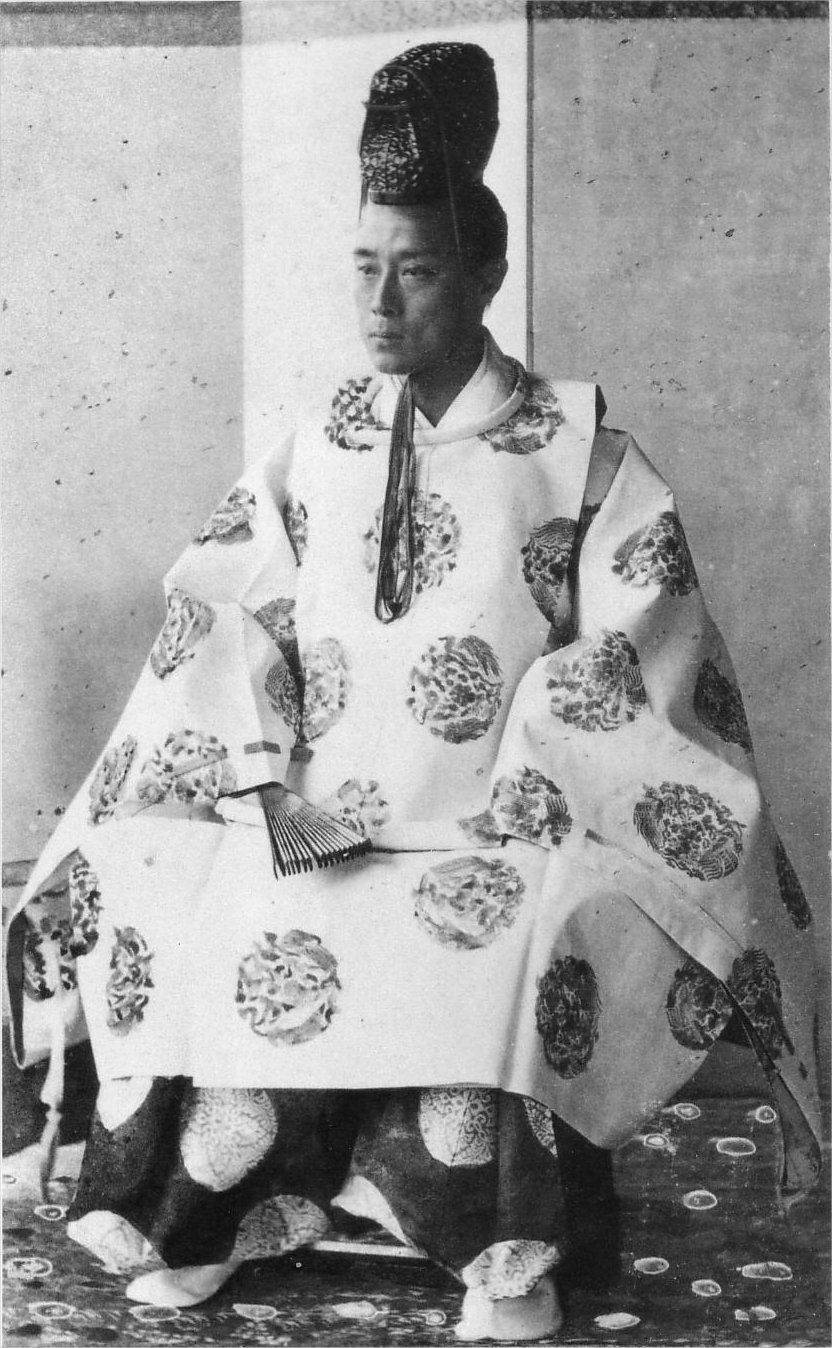
Tokugawa Yoshinobu, the last shogun

The beginning of the Bakumatsu era at the end of the Edo period is the subject of various theories, and can be dated to the 1820s and 1830s, when the shogunate's rule became unstable, or to the Tenpō Reforms of 1841–1843, or to Matthew C. Perry's arrival in Japan in 1853 and his call for the opening of the country. On the other hand, the end point is clear, when the 15th Shogun, Tokugawa Yoshinobu, returned the authority to govern Japan to Emperor Meiji.

During this period, the shogunate, the imperial court, the various han (藩, daimyo domains), and the samurai were deeply divided into two factions: the Nanki faction (南紀派), which favored the shogunate's leadership in dealing with domestic and foreign crises, and the Hitotsubashi faction (一橋派), which recommended that the shogunate form a coalition with the powerful han (daimyo domain) and the imperial court. The Nanki faction favored Tokugawa Iemochi as the successor to the 13th shogun, Tokugawa Iesada, while the Hitotsubashi favored Tokugawa Yoshinobu. When the shogunate concluded the Convention of Kanagawa in 1854 and the Treaty of Amity and Commerce in 1858, the Hitotsubashi faction opposed these treaties, but the shogunate captured and executed them in the Ansei Purge. In retaliation, Hitotsubashi samurai assassinated Ii Naosuke, the tairō (大老, Great Elder) in the Sakuradamon Incident. To win over the Hitotsubashi faction, the shogunate advocated a Kōbu gattai (公武合体, Union of the Imperial Court and the Shogunate) and welcomed Kazunomiya, the younger sister of Emperor Komei, as the wife of the 14th shogun, Tokugawa Iemochi, but the Hitotsubashi faction condemned this political marriage.

The Chōshū Domain was the most radical, advocating the overthrow of the shogunate, emperor-centered politics, and the defeat of foreign powers. They expanded their political power through exchanges with Sanjo Sanetomi and others in the imperial court who shared their ideology. In response, the Satsuma and Aizu domains and some aristocrats who supported the Kōbu gattai expelled Sanjo Sanetomi and the Chōshū Domain from Kyoto in a political uprising on August 18 of the lunar calendar in 1863. In 1864, some forces of the Chōshū Domain marched toward Kyoto in the Kinmon incident, but the combined forces of the shogunate, the Satsuma Domain, and the Aizu Domain defeated the Chōshū Domain. In 1864, the Shogunate sent a large force against the rebellious Chōshū Domain in the First Chōshū expedition. The Shogunate won the war without a fight, as the leaders of the Chōshū Domain committed seppuku. Meanwhile, the Chōshū Domain was defeated by foreign allied forces in the Shimonoseki campaign, and the Satsuma Domain engaged the British forces in the Bombardment of Kagoshima. Both domains realized that Japan was militarily behind the Western powers, and they promoted reforms within their domains while strengthening their will to overthrow the shogunate.

In 1866, Sakamoto Ryōma brokered a dramatic reconciliation between the previously hostile Chōshū and Satsuma domains, and the Chōshū and Satsuma domains formed the Satchō Alliance. In 1866, the shogunate launched the Second Chōshū expedition, but was defeated by the Chōshū Domain, severely damaging the shogunate's prestige. The Satsuma Domain refused the shogunate's order to go to war. In 1867, the 15th shogun, Tokugawa Yoshinobu, finally returned power to Emperor Meiji, ending the Edo period and 700 years of shogunate rule over Japan.

From 1868 to 1869, the imperial forces, led by the Chōshū and Satsuma domains, and the former shogunate forces, led by the Aizu Domain, fought the Boshin War, which the imperial forces won. With this war, the domestic pacification of the imperial forces was nearly complete, and with the Meiji Restoration, Japan began to rapidly modernize and emerge as an international military and economic power. The rapid modernization of Japan during the Meiji era (1868–1912) was aided by the fact that, under the rule of successive Tokugawa shoguns, many Japanese were educated in terakoya (寺子屋, private elementary schools) and had a thriving publishing culture.

The Satsuma Rebellion of 1877 was the last battle between the imperial forces and the disenfranchised ex-samurai and the last civil war in Japan. As a result of this war, the warrior class ended its history.

The Honjō Masamune was inherited by successive shoguns and it represented the Tokugawa shogunate. It was crafted by swordsmith Masamune (1264–1343) and recognized as one of the finest Japanese swords in history. After World War 2, in December 1945, Tokugawa Iemasa gave the sword to a police station at Mejiro and it went missing.

==== Heirs of the Tokugawa shogun ====
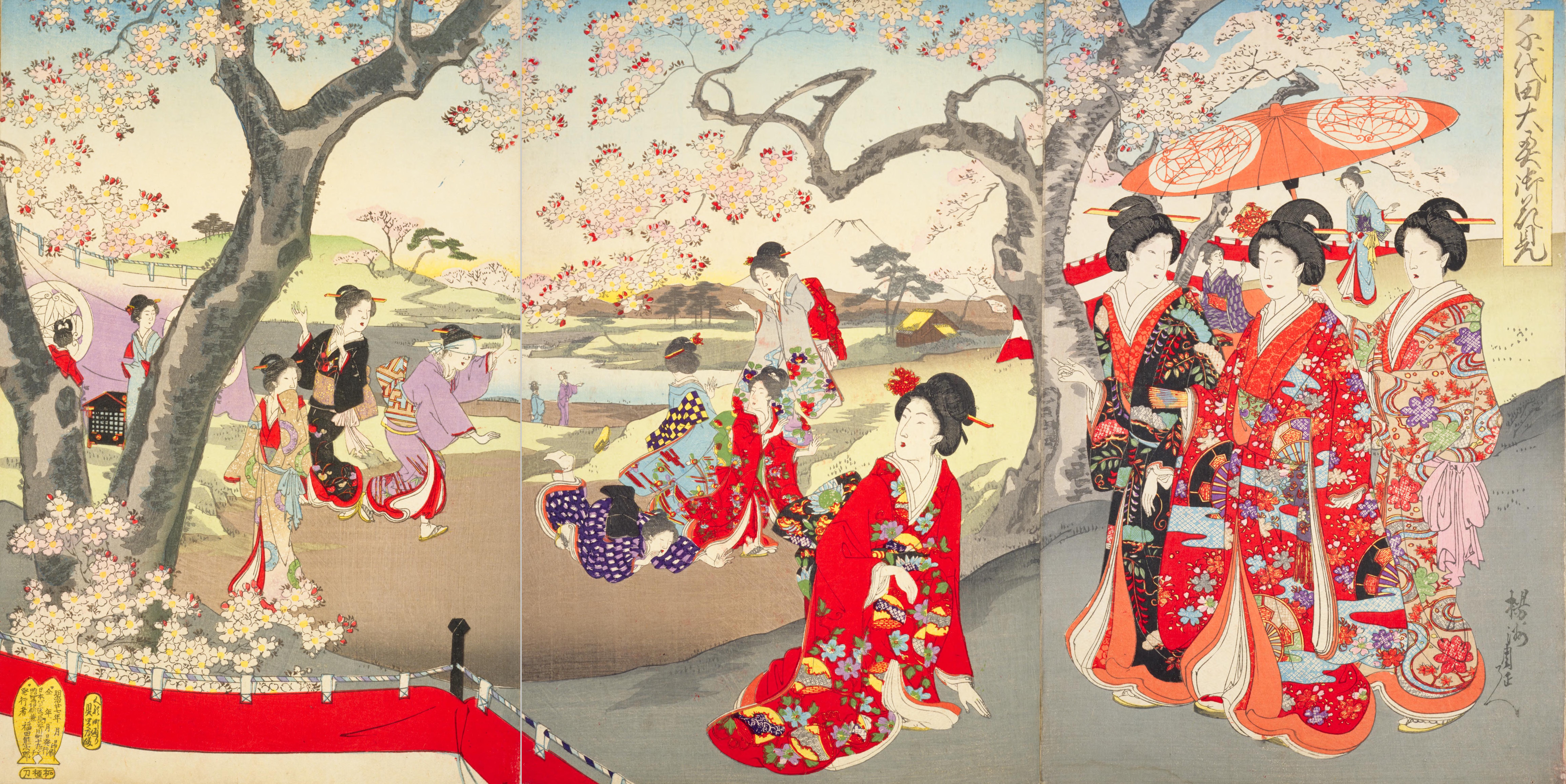
Ukiyo-e depicting women in the ōoku (大奥, great interior) enjoying the cherry blossoms

During the reign of the third shogun, Tokugawa Iemitsu, the ōoku (大奥, great interior) at Edo Castle was expanded at the suggestion of his nanny, Lady Kasuga, to ensure the birth of a male heir to the shogun's lineage, and became a vast shogun's harem with nearly 1,000 women working as maidservants. The women of ōoku were highly hierarchical, with the official wife (御台所, midaidokoro) of the shogun, who was of aristocratic lineage, ruling at the top, and the older women who had served her for a long time actually controlling ōoku. The women who worked as maidservants in ōoku were daughters of the hatamoto (旗本), a high-ranking class of samurai, and they had servants from the chōnin (町人, townspeople) and peasants who worked for them. Even low-ranking servants were treated as concubines of the shogun if they bore his children. One such example was Otama, the daughter of a grocer, who gave birth to the fifth shogun, Tokugawa Ietsuna. The ōoku was also used to ensure the Tokugawa shogun's rule over the country by arranging political marriages between the shogun's children and the children of daimyo in various regions. The ōoku continued until 1868, when the Tokugawa shogunate was dissolved.

The Owari, Kishū (Kii), and Mito Tokugawa families, called the gosanke (御三家, the Three Houses of the Tokugawa), founded by the children of Tokugawa Ieyasu, were the second most prestigious family after the shogun's family, and if the shogun's family failed to produce an heir, a male member of one of the three families was installed as shogun. For example, the 8th shogun, Tokugawa Yoshimune, and the 14th shogun, Tokugawa Iemochi, were originally heads of the Kishū Tokugawa family.

In order to keep the shogun's lineage alive, the 8th Shogun, Yoshimune, had his children establish the Tayasu, Hitotsubashi, and Shimizu Tokugawa families, which were called the gosankyō (御三卿, Three Lords) and were treated as the second most prestigious daimyo after the Gosanke. Of these, the Hitotsubashi Tokugawa family produced the 11th shogun, Tokugawa Ienari. His son Tokugawa Ieyoshi became the 12th shogun, and Ieyoshi's son Tokugawa Iesada became the 13th shogun. Tokugawa Yoshinobu became the 15th shogun after being adopted by the Hitotsubashi Tokugawa family from the Mito Tokugawa family. The head of Gosankyō had the privilege of entering the ōoku, where men were forbidden.

== Shogunate (Bakufu) ==
=== Etymology ===
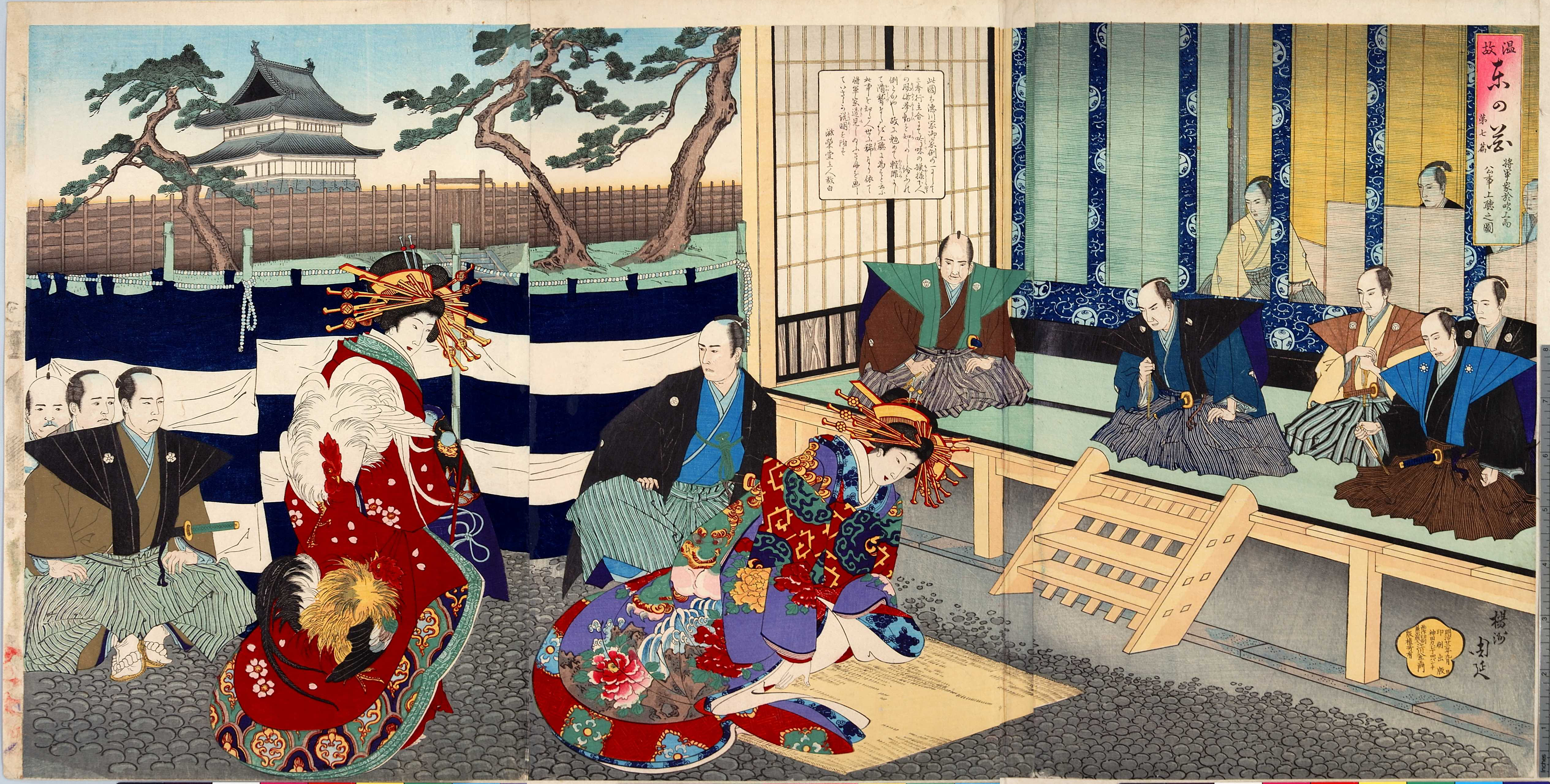
The shogun hearing a lawsuit at the Fukiage of Edo Castle, by Toyohara Chikanobu

From the 1800s, the shogunate's administration was known as the bakufu (幕府), literally meaning "government from the curtain". In this context, "curtain" is a synecdoche for a type of semi-open tent called a maku, a temporary battlefield headquarters from which a samurai general would direct his forces, and whose sides would be decorated with his mon. The application of the term bakufu to the shogunate government was therefore heavy with symbolism, connoting both the explicitly military character of the shogunal regime and its (at least theoretically) ephemeral nature.

The term bakufu (幕府; "tent government") originally meant the dwelling and household of a shogun, but in time, became a metonym for the system of government dominated by a feudal military monarchy, exercised in the name of the shogun or by the shogun himself.

The term bakufu was not officially used at the time of the shogunate; the Tokugawa shogunate was called kōgi (公儀). It was not until the Bakumatsu era in the 1800s that the term bakufu began to be actively used in its current meaning of "shogunate". The late Mito school of the time preferred the term bakufu because they wanted to emphasize that Japan was an emperor-centered country, and that the shogunate was merely the administration of the shogun appointed by the emperor. The modern use of the term was then established when history textbooks at Imperial Universities in the 1890s defined that only the three regimes of Kamakura, Ashikaga, and Tokugawa were bakufu and that the appointment of a shogun was essential for the establishment of the bakufu.

=== Governance structure ===
The shogunate system was originally established under the Kamakura shogunate by Minamoto no Yoritomo after the Genpei War, although theoretically the state, and therefore the Emperor, still held de jure ownership of all land in Japan. The system had some feudal elements, with lesser territorial lords pledging their allegiance to greater ones. Samurai were rewarded for their loyalty with agricultural surplus, usually rice, or labor services from peasants. In contrast to European feudal knights, samurai were not landowners. The hierarchy that held this system of government together was reinforced by close ties of loyalty between the daimyō, samurai, and their subordinates.

Each shogunate was dynamic, not static. Power was constantly shifting and authority was often ambiguous. The study of the ebbs and flows in this complex history continues to occupy the attention of scholars. Each shogunate encountered competition. Sources of competition included the Emperor and the court aristocracy, the remnants of the imperial governmental systems, the daimyōs, the shōen system, the great temples and shrines, the sōhei, the shugo and jitō, the jizamurai and early modern daimyō. Each shogunate reflected the necessity of new ways of balancing the changing requirements of central and regional authorities.

=== Relationship with the emperor ===
The Imperial Seal of Japan

Since Minamoto no Yoritomo turned the figure of the shogun into a permanent and hereditary position and until the Meiji Restoration, there were two ruling classes in Japan:

- The emperor or tennō (天皇; lit. "Heavenly Sovereign"), who acted as "chief priest" of the official religion of the country, Shinto.
- The shogun, head of the army who also enjoyed civil, military, diplomatic and judicial authority. Although in theory the shogun was an emperor's servant, he became the true power behind the throne.

No shogun tried to usurp the throne, even when they had at their disposal the military power of the territory. There were two reasons primarily:

- Theoretically the shogun received the power of the emperor, so this was his symbol of authority.
- There was a tradition held by priests and religious who traced the imperial line from the "age of the gods" into an "eternal line unbroken by the times". According to Japanese mythology, the emperor was a direct descendant of Amaterasu, goddess of the sun.

Unable to usurp the throne, the shoguns sought throughout history to keep the emperor away from the country's political activity, relegating them from the sphere of influence. One of the few powers that the imperial house could retain was that of being able to "control time" through the designation of the Japanese Nengō or Eras and the issuance of calendars.

Emperors twice tried to recover the power they enjoyed before the establishment of the shogunate. In 1219 the Emperor Go-Toba accused the Hōjō as outlaws. Imperial troops mobilized, leading to the Jōkyū War (1219–1221), which would culminate in the third Battle of Uji (1221). During this, the imperial troops were defeated and the emperor Go-Toba was exiled. With the defeat of Go-Toba, the samurai government over the country was confirmed. At the beginning of the fourteenth century the Emperor Go-Daigo decided to rebel, but the Hōjō, who were then regents, sent an army from Kamakura. The emperor fled before the troops arrived and took the imperial insignia. The shogun named his own emperor, giving rise to the era Nanboku-chō period (南北朝; lit. "Southern and Northern Courts").

During the 1850s and 1860s, the shogunate was severely pressured both abroad and by foreign powers. It was then that various groups angry with the shogunate for the concessions made to the various European countries found in the figure of the emperor an ally through which they could expel the Tokugawa shogunate from power. The motto of this movement was Sonnō jōi (尊王攘夷; "Revere the Emperor, Eject the Barbarians") and they finally succeeded in 1868, when imperial power was restored after centuries of being in the shadow of the country's political life.

== Legacy ==
Today, the head of the Japanese government is the Prime Minister. The usage of the term "shogun" has nevertheless continued in colloquialisms. A retired Prime Minister who still wields considerable power and influence behind the scenes is called a "shadow shogun", a sort of modern incarnation of the cloistered rule. Examples of "shadow shoguns" are former Prime Minister Kakuei Tanaka and the politician Ichirō Ozawa.

== See also ==
- Caudillo
- Commander-in-chief
- Feudalism
- Generalissimo
- History of Japan
- Kantō kubō
- List of shoguns

== Bibliography ==
- Adolphson, Mikael; Edward Kamens, Stacie Matsumoto (2007). Heian Japan: Centers and Peripheries. University of Hawaii Press. ISBN 0-8248-3013-X.
- Friday, Karl (2007). The First Samurai: The Life and Legend of the Warrior Rebel, Taira Masakado. John Wiley and Sons. ISBN 0-471-76082-X.
- Hall, John Whitney; James L. McClain, Marius B. Jansen (1991). The Cambridge History of Japan. Cambridge University Press. ISBN 0-521-22355-5.
- Iwao, Seiichi; Teizō Iyanaga, Maison Franco-Japonaise Tōkyō, Susumu Ishii, Shōichirō Yoshida (2002). Maisonneuve & Larose. ISBN 2-7068-1575-2.
- Cranston, Edwin (1998). A Waka Anthology: Volume One: The Gem-Glistening Cup. Stanford University Press. ISBN 0-8047-3157-8.
- Sansom, George Bailey (1931). Japan: A Short Cultural History. Stanford University Press. ISBN 0-8047-0954-8.
- Takekoshi, Yosaburō (2004). The Economic Aspects of the History of the Civilization of Japan. Taylor & Francis. ISBN 0-415-32379-7.
- Shively, Donald; John Whitney Hall, William H. McCullough (1999). The Cambridge History of Japan: Heian Japan. Cambridge University Press. ISBN 0-521-22353-9.
- De Bary, William Theodore; Yoshiko Kurata Dykstra; George Tanabe; Paul Varley (2001). Sources of Japanese Tradition: From Earliest Times to 1600. Columbia University Press. ISBN 0-231-12139-3.
- Turnbull, Stephen (2005). Samurai Commanders. Vol. 1: 940–1576. Osprey Publishing. ISBN 1-84176-743-3.
- Turnbull, Stephen (2006). Samuráis: la historia de los grandes guerreros de Japón (in Spanish). Translated by Antón, José. LIBSA. ISBN 84-662-1229-9.
- Deal, William (2007). Handbook to Life in Medieval and Early Modern Japan. Oxford University Press US. ISBN 0-19-533126-5.
- Perkins, Dorothy (1998). The Samurai of Japan: A Chronology from Their Origin in the Heian Era (794–1185) to the Modern Era. Diane Publishing. ISBN 0-7881-4525-8.
- Perkins, George. (1998). The Clear Mirror: A Chronicle of the Japanese Court During the Kamakura Period (1185–1333). Stanford University Press. ISBN 0-8047-2953-0.
- Murdoch, James (1996). A History of Japan: 1652–1868. Routledge. ISBN 0-415-15417-0.
- Hall, John Whitney (1 January 1977). Japan in the Muromachi Age. University of California Press. p. 11. ISBN 978-0-520-02888-3.
- Grossberg, Kenneth A. (1976). "From Feudal Chieftain to Secular Monarch. The Development of Shogunal Power in Early Muromachi Japan". Monumenta Nipponica. 31 (1): 34. doi:10.2307/2384184. ISSN 0027-0741.
- Roth, Andrew (15 March 2007). Dilemma in Japan. Roth Press. ISBN 978-1-4067-6311-9.
- Fiévé, Nicolas; Waley, Paul (2003). Japanese Capitals in Historical Perspective: Place, Power and Memory in Kyoto, Edo and Tokyo. Routledge. ISBN 0-4154-0581-5.
- Andressen, Curtis; Milton Osborne (2002). A Short History of Japan: From Samurai to Sony. Allen & Unwin. ISBN 1-86508-516-2.
- Ramírez-Faria, Carlos. Concise Encyclopedia of World History. Atlantic Publishers & Distributors. ISBN 81-269-0775-4.
- Mitchelhill, Jennifer; David Green (2003). Castles of the Samurai: Power and Beauty. Kodansha International. ISBN 4-7700-2954-3.
- Kuno, Yoshi (2007). Japanese Expansion on the Asiatic Continent - Volume I. Read Books. ISBN 1-4067-2253-7.
- Davis, Paul (2001). 100 Decisive Battles: From Ancient Times to the Present. Oxford University Press US. ISBN 0-19-514366-3.
