= Toraijin =

Pre-modern immigrants to Japan

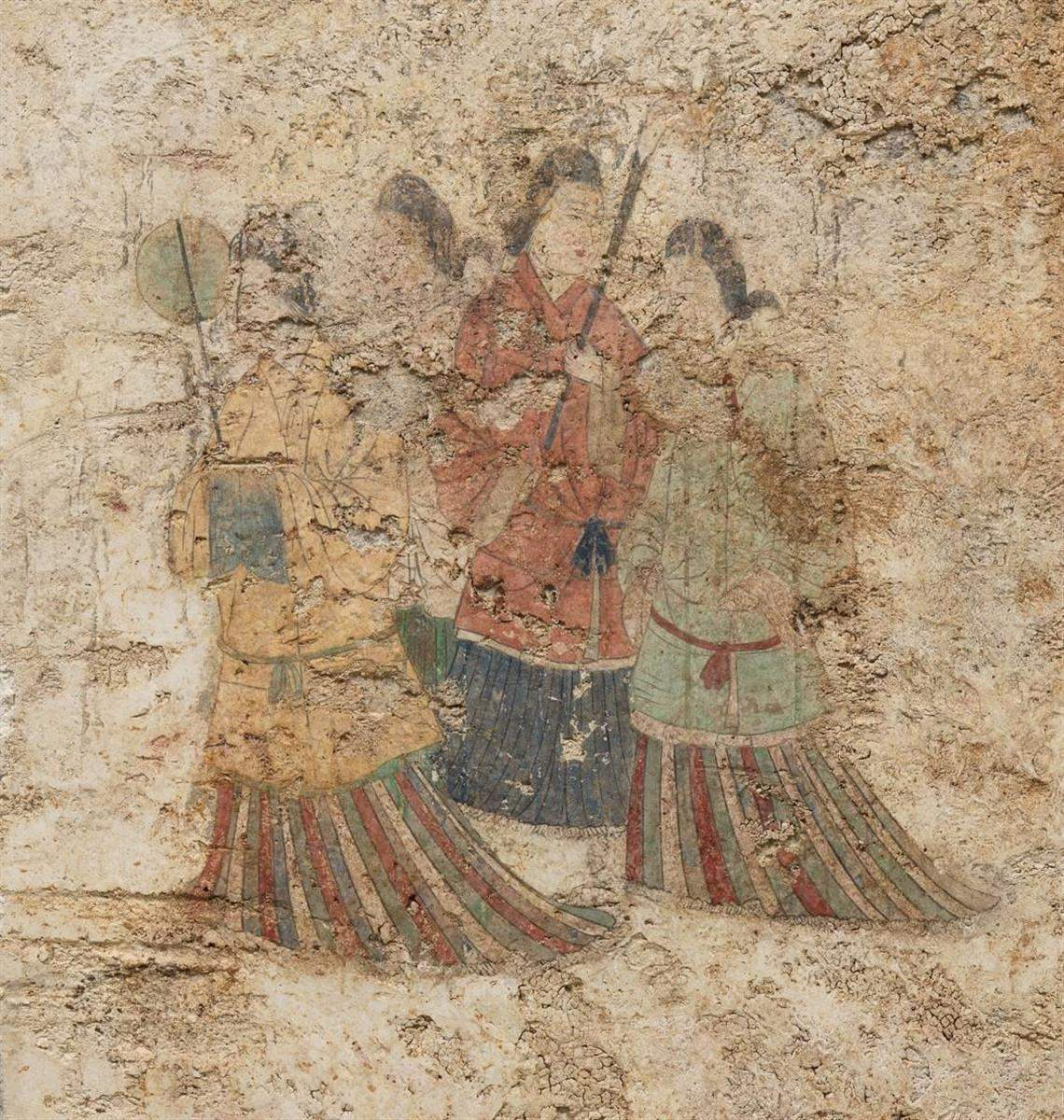
A mural of women in Goguryeo-style clothing on the western wall of the Takamatsuzuka Tomb (Kofun), believed to be depicting Toraijin from Goguryeo during the Asuka period.

Toraijin (Japanese: 渡来人, とらいじん) refers to the ancient people who migrated to the Japanese archipelago, as well as their naturalized descendants. Up until the 1960s, these people were commonly called the "Kikajin (Japanese: 帰化人, きかじん)", meaning "naturalized people", but beginning in the 1970s, the term was replaced by "Toraijin", meaning "people who have crossed over" as not all those who came to Japan became naturalized.

They arrived in Japan as early as the Jōmon period or Yayoi period, and their arrival became more significant from the end of the 4th century (Kofun period) to the late 7th century (Asuka period). During these periods, they introduced Confucianism, Buddhism, Chinese characters (Kanbun/Kanji), medicine, lunar calendar, and cultural practices such as Sue ware production and weaving to Japan. They were favored by the Yamato Imperial Court, and many were appointed to government positions.

== Overview ==
Historical records and archaeological data provide strong support for continued population movements from the continent to the Japanese archipelago via the southern Korean Peninsula from 800 BCE to 600 CE. The Toraijin arrived in the archipelago in multiples waves.

In the initial wave starting approximately three thousand years ago, where 20th century anthropologists such as Torii Ryūzō stated that "the Stone Age in Japan and that in Korea are very similar. The similarities are so outstanding that we can say their relationship was like that of cousins, if not of a parent and child, or siblings" in his book Yūshi izen no Nihon (有史以前の日本, Japan before History), highlighting a close connection between the Japanese and the Koreans even during the prehistoric periods due to the major overlap of immigrants.

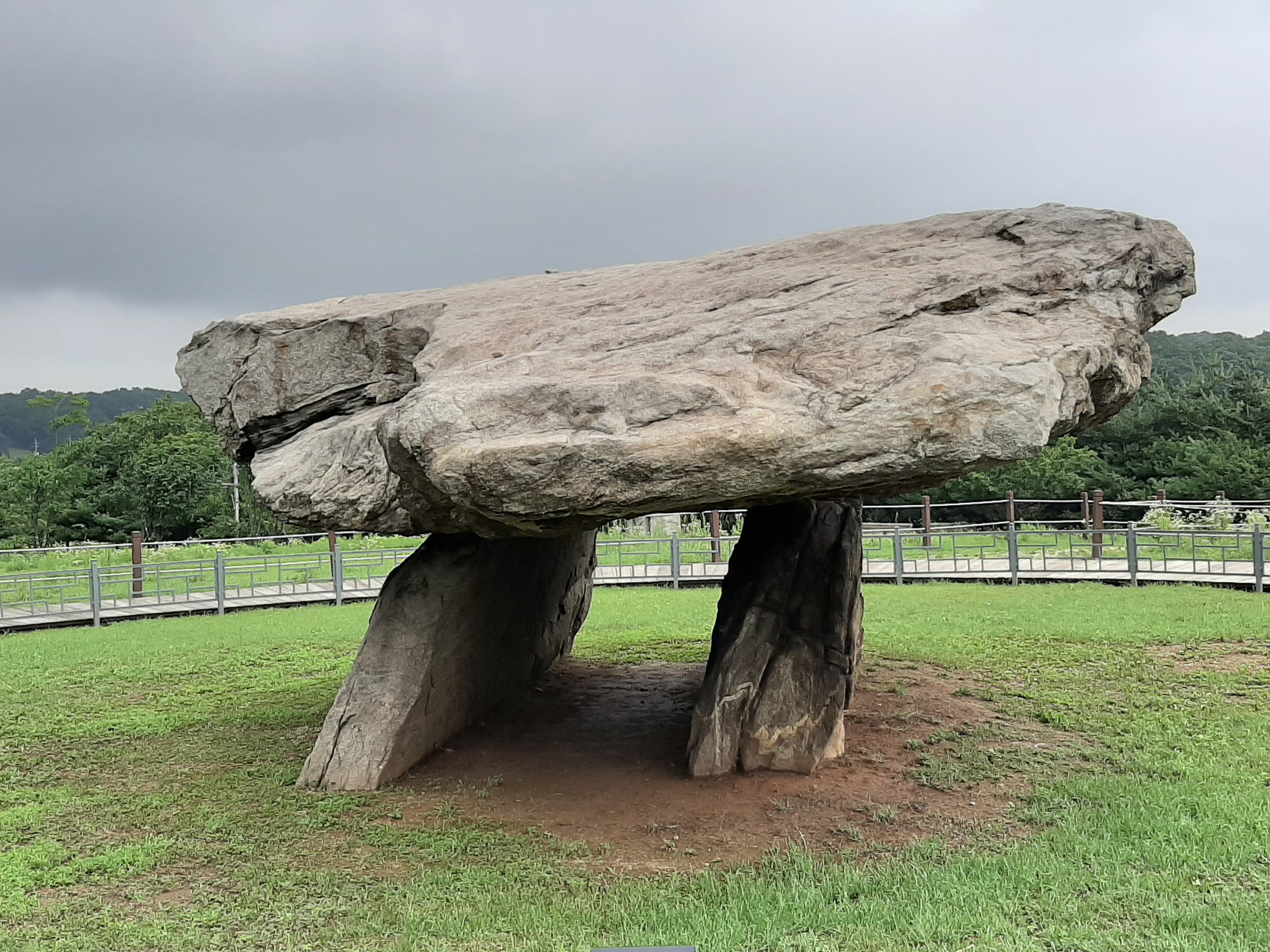
A Stone Age dolmen at Ganghwa Island, South Korea.

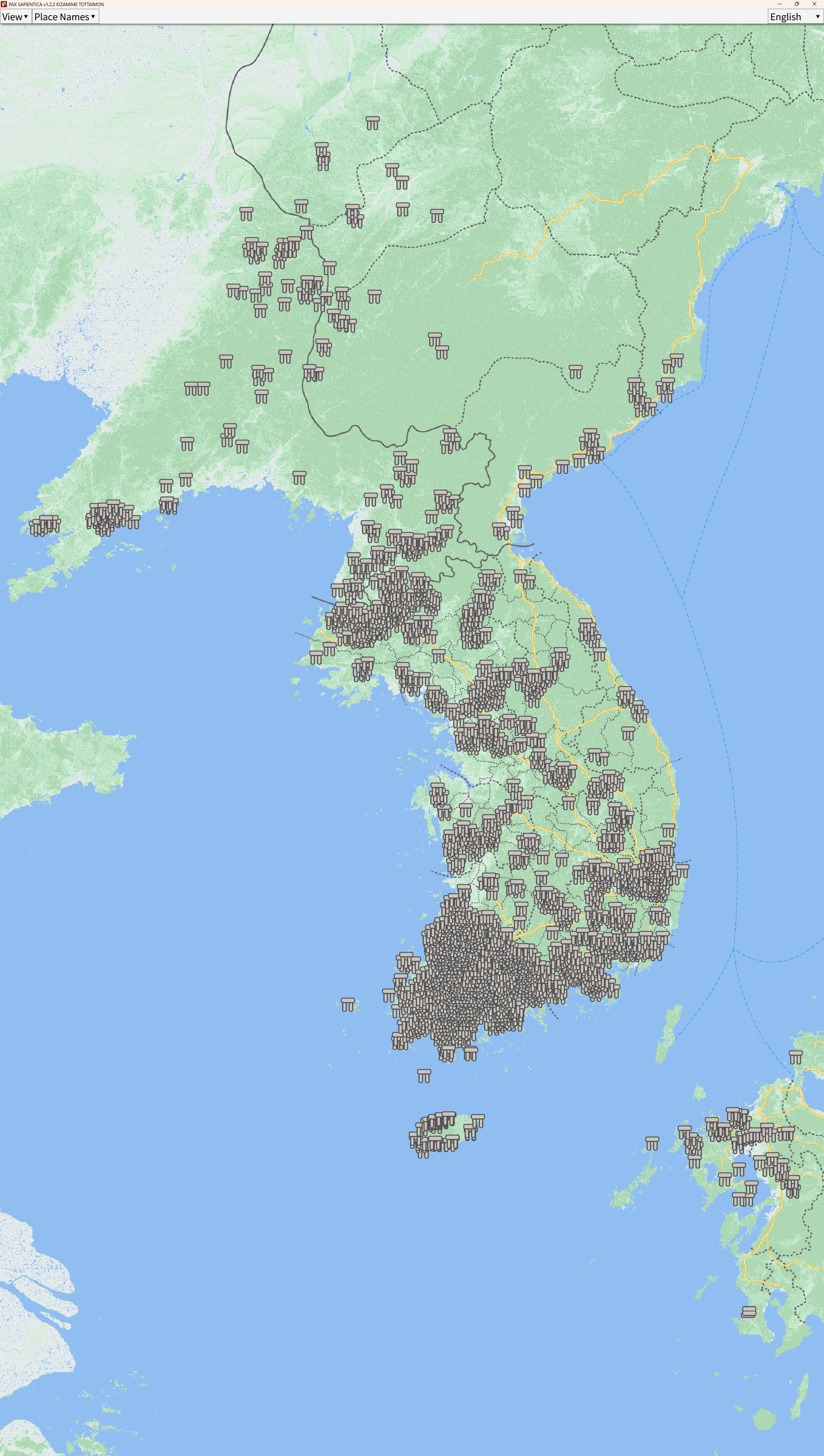
40,000 dolmens distributed in Korea which account for approximately 40% of the world's total.

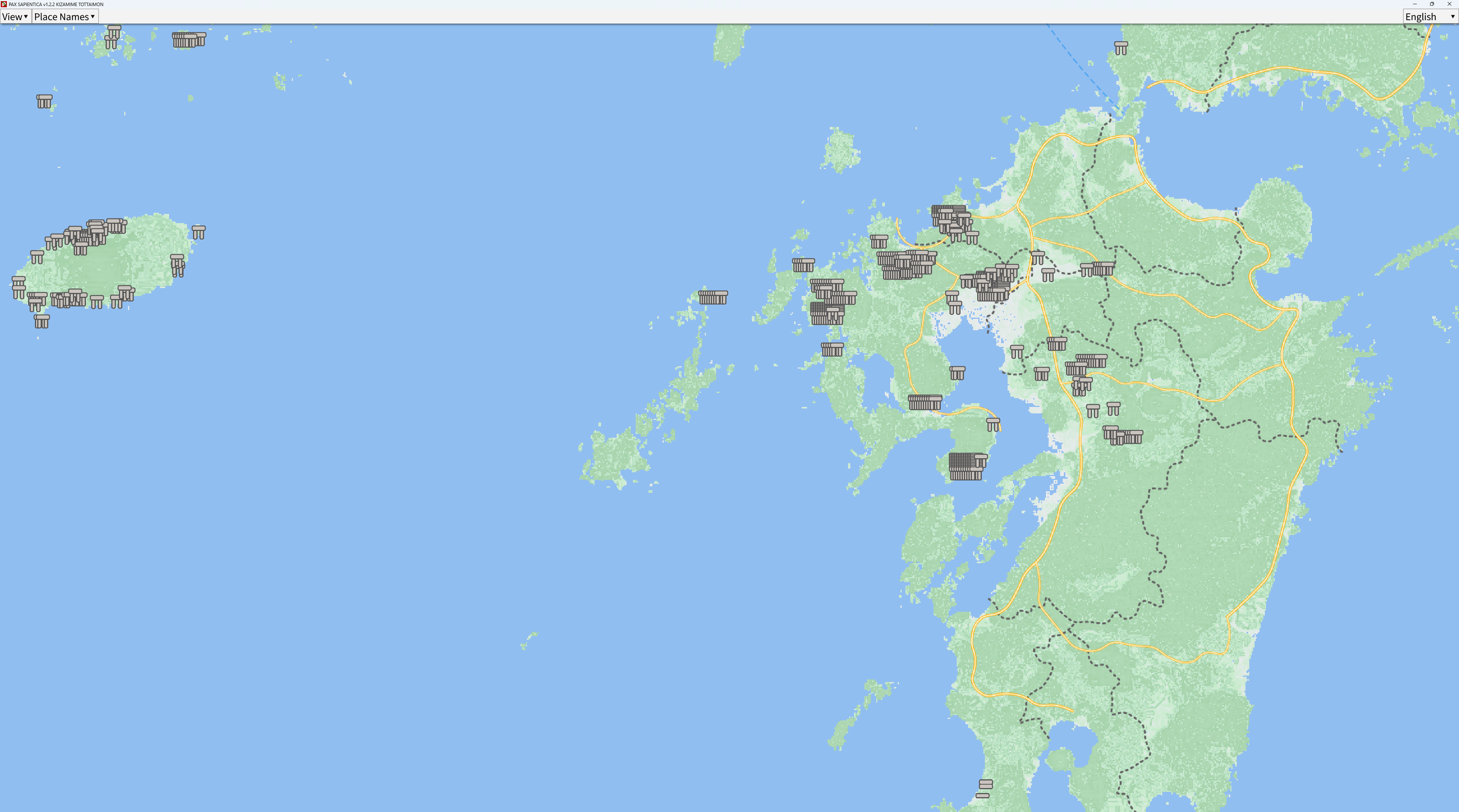
Dolmens found in Jeju Island and northern Kyushu (Japan).

Early Torajin, who arrived in the 1st millennium BCE (encompassing early-Jōmon period to middle-Yayoi period), are thought to have introduced rice cultivation and earthenware (such as Jōmon pottery and Yayoi pottery) to Japan (mainly in northern Kyushu).

During the formative 5th and 6th centuries, they brought horse breeding and horse driven transportation, stoneware pottery, high temperature iron-working, advanced iron tool manufacturing, and their Chinese-based writing system. In addition to technological and cultural contributions, Toraijin also brought the ideologies of Confucianism and Buddhism from the mainland, which were critical to the state formation and socio-cultural changes during the Kofun period and Asuka period.

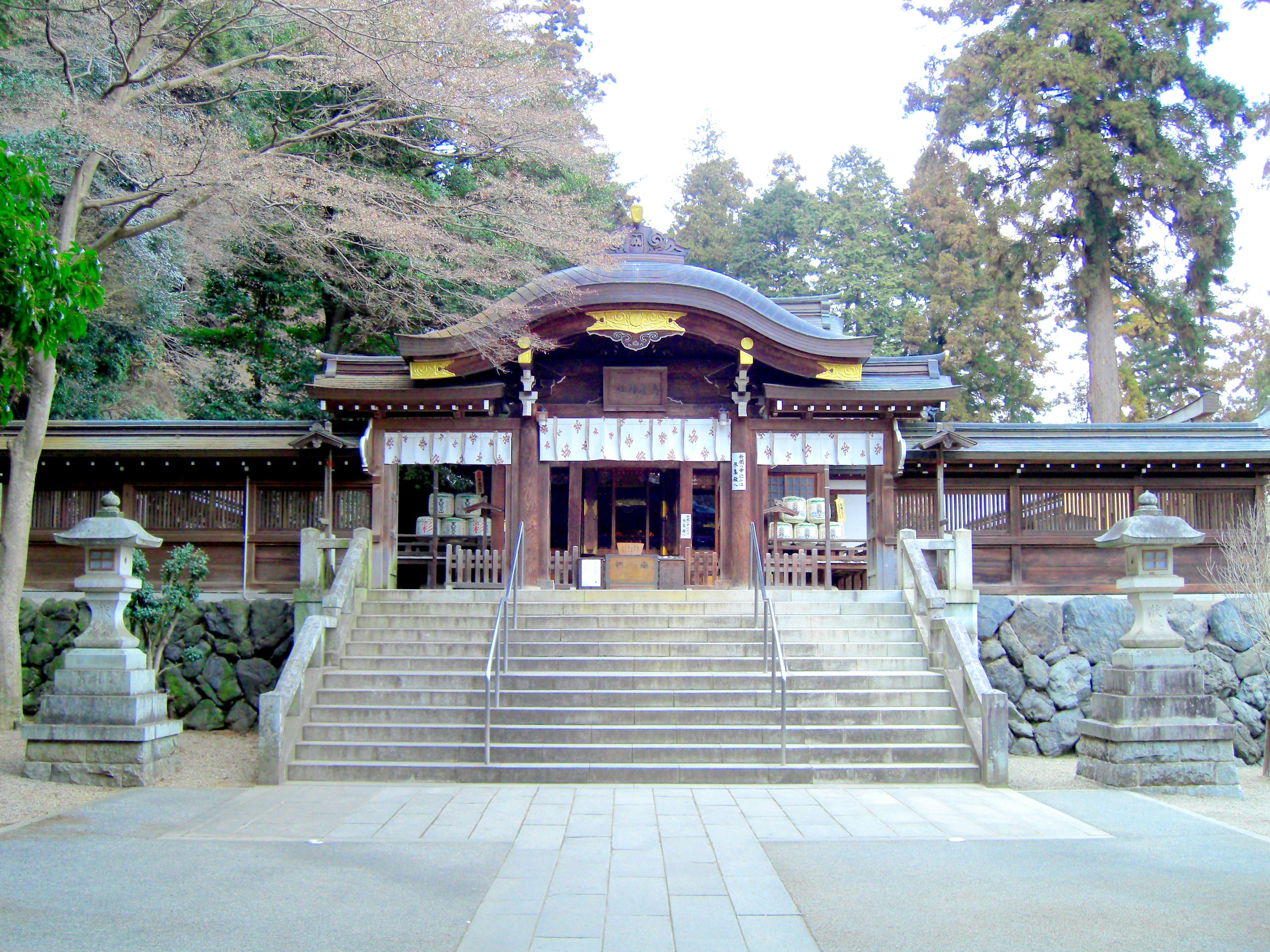
Koma Shrine, one of the many shrines founded by Toraijin in Japan.

The lasting impact of the immigrants from Korea can still be found in placenames within modern Japan in places such as Komae (狛江) city, deriving from the word "Koma (高麗)" from Goguryeo; Niiza (新座) city, deriving from the word "Shiragi (新羅)" from Silla; and possibly Nara (奈良) city, deriving from the word "Nara (나라)" meaning "country". Many ancient shrines also possess legacy of the immigrants in names such as Koma Shrine (Goguryeo), Shinra Shrine (新羅神社; Silla), and Kudara no Ō Shrine (百済王神社; Paekche).

In other instances, Toraijin influence is not deliberately shown within names, but can still be recognized via remnants left by their cultural impact. In many cases, Toraijin elements that have ancient roots in Korea such as Korean shamanism can be seen throughout modern Japan today. One of the many relics is the presence of Jangseung, known as Shōgunhyō (将軍標) in Japan, wooden or stone totems (found normally in pairs) that are believed to ward off evil from sacred places.

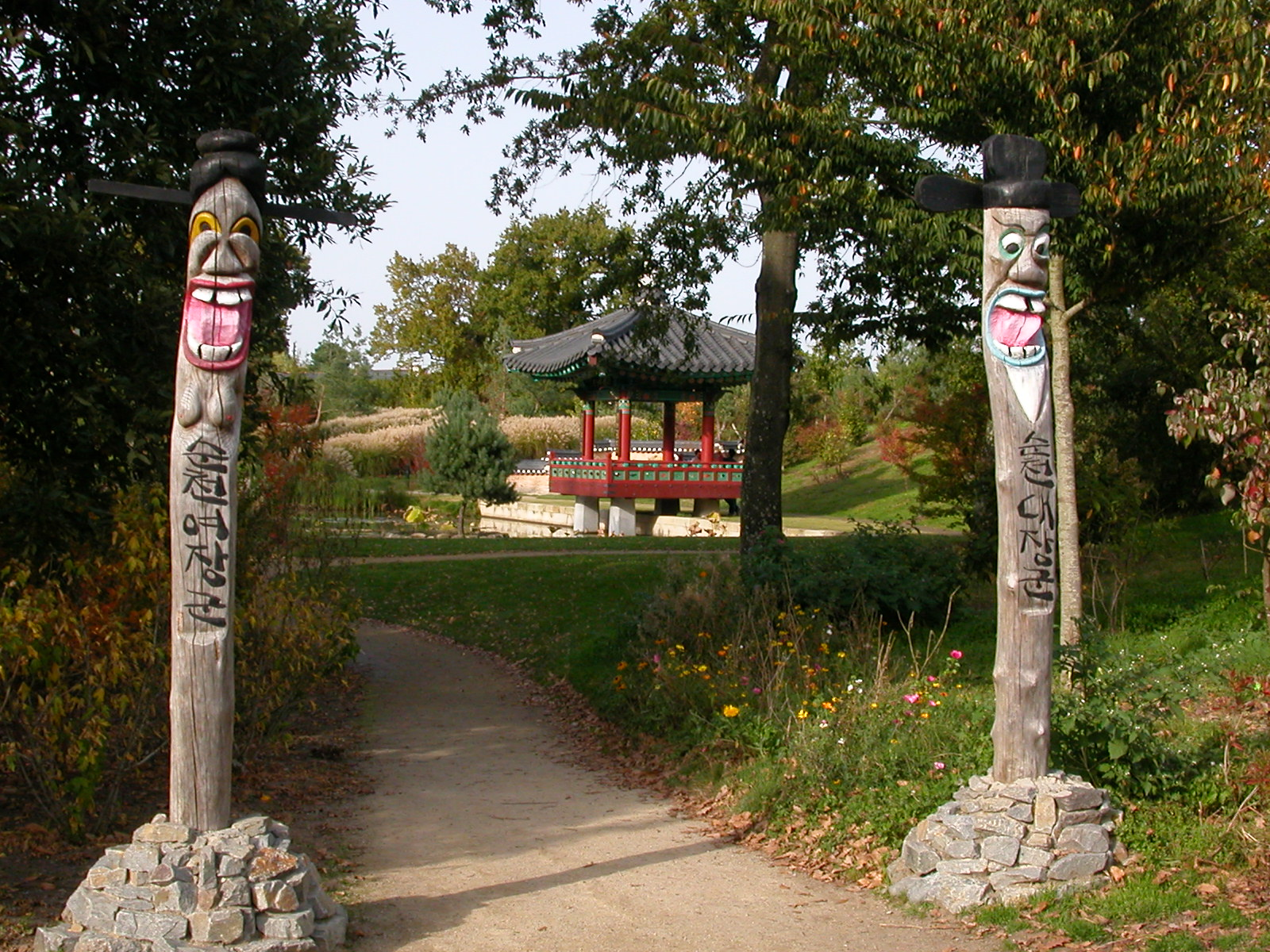
Wooden pair of Jaengseungs found in Korea.

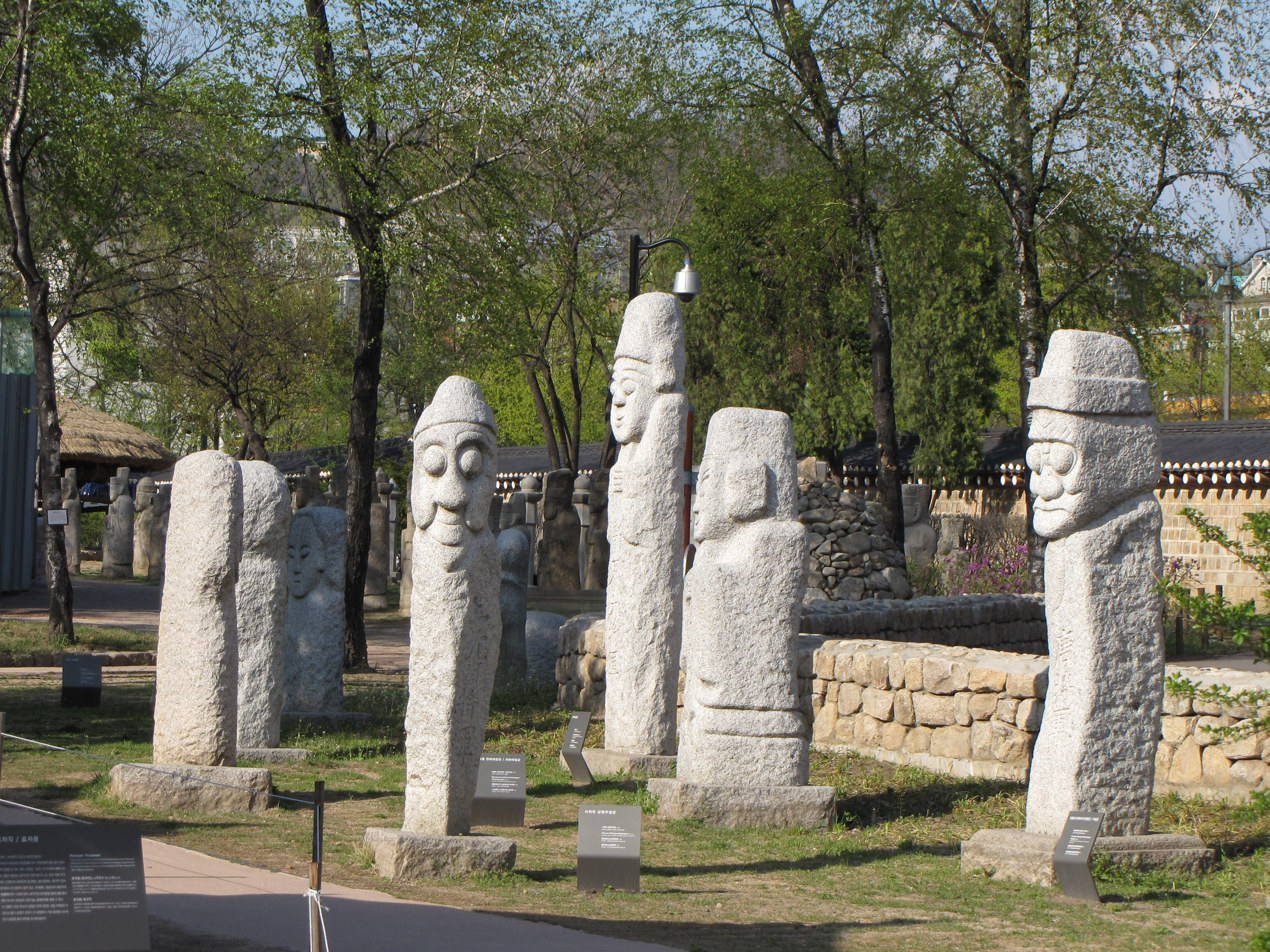
Stone pairs found in Korea.

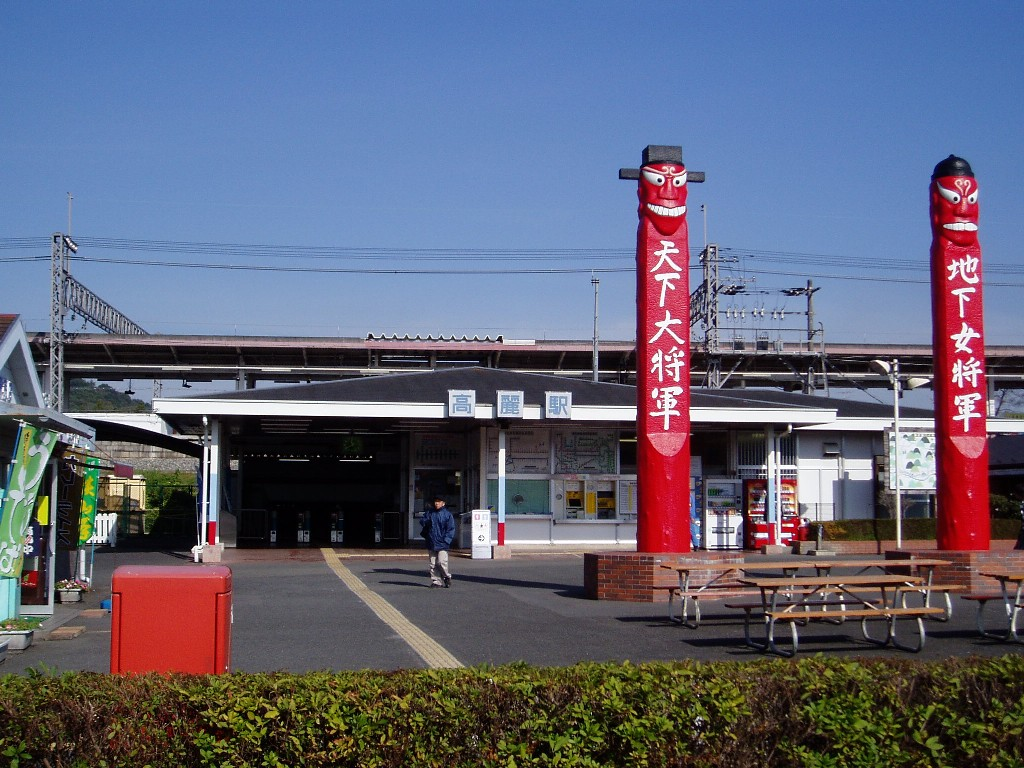
Wooden pair found in Koma station.

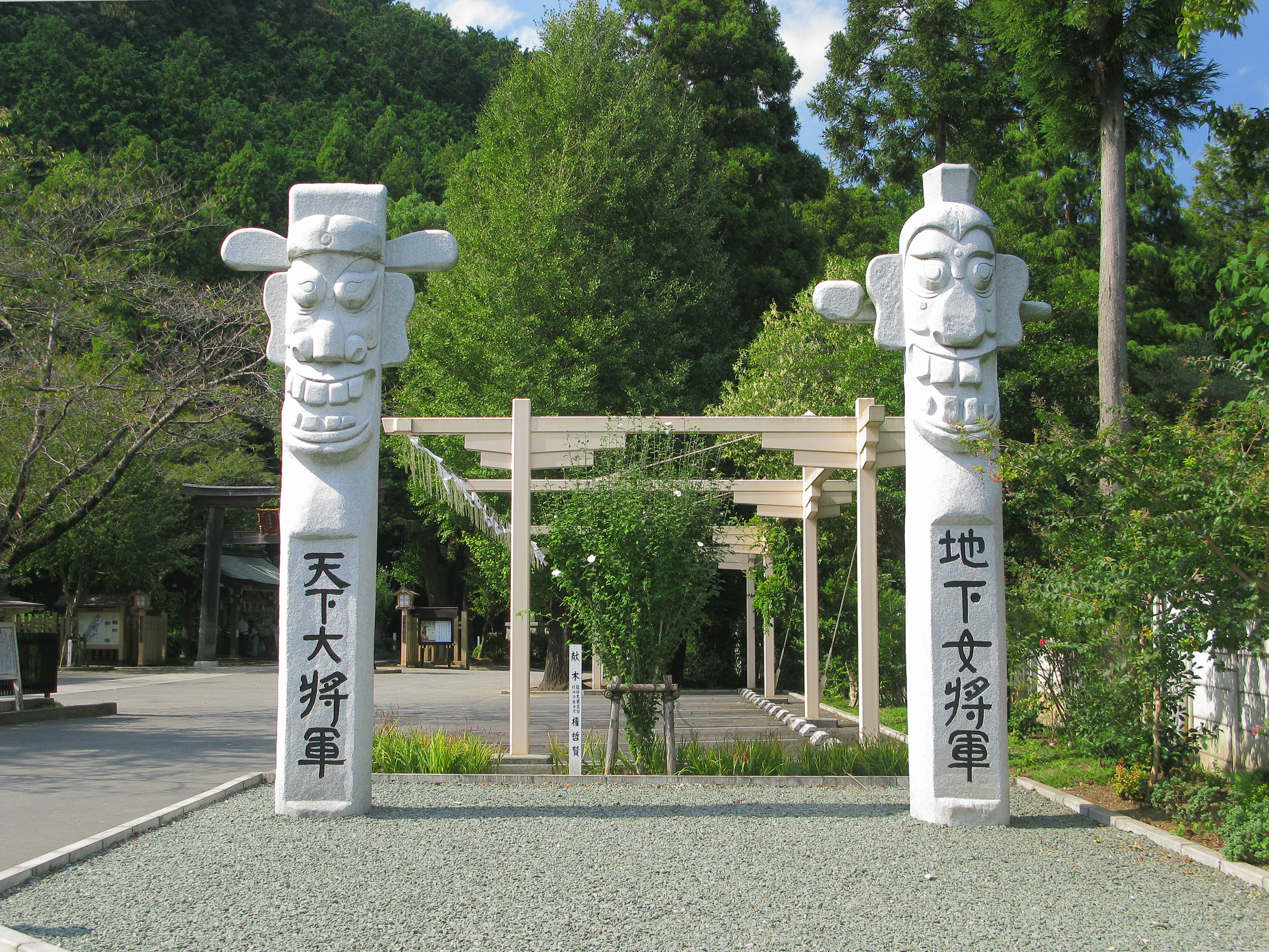
Stone pair found in Koma Shrine.

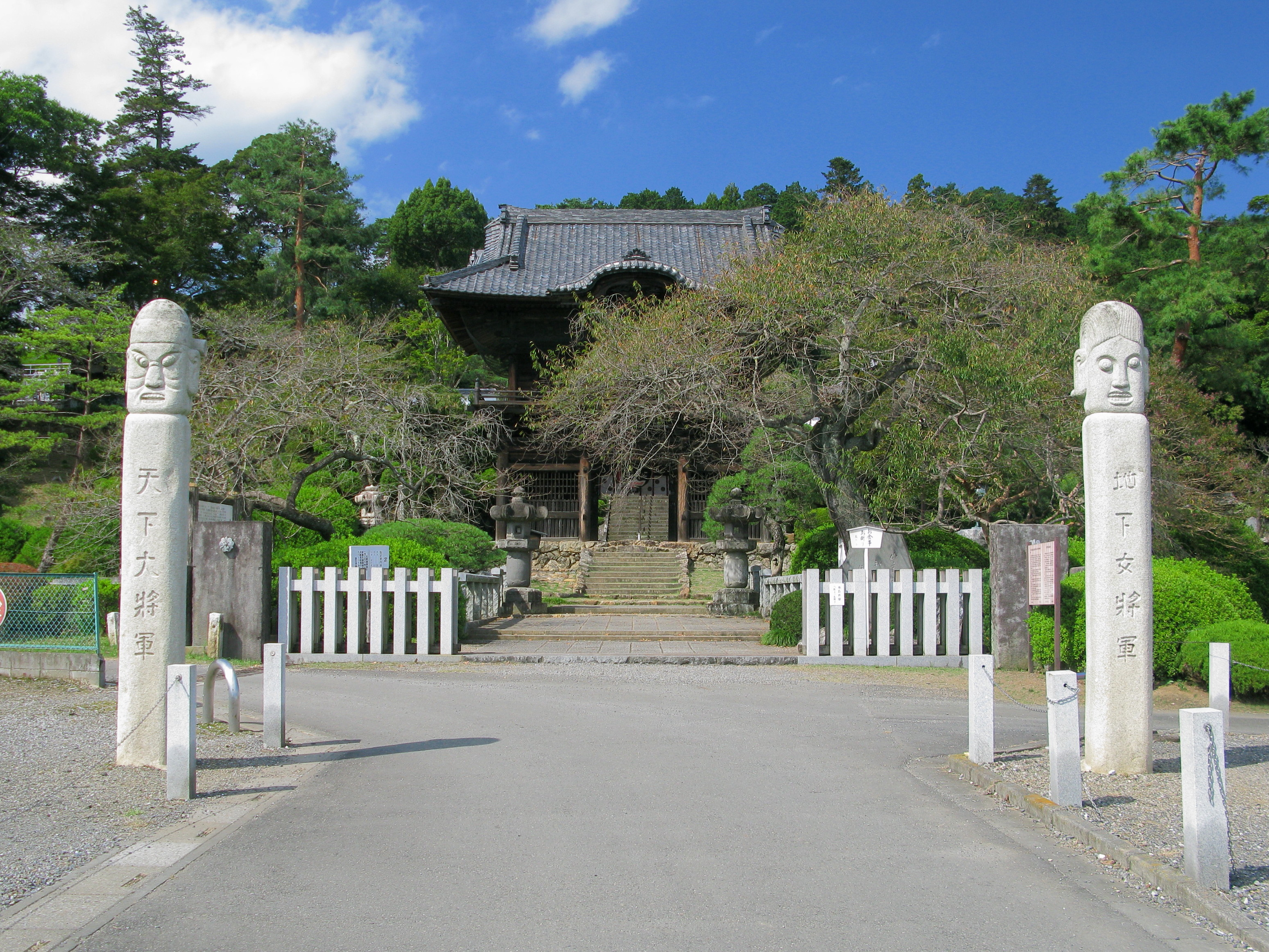
Stone pair found in Shōraku Shrine (勝樂寺).

Other relics within Japan also point to Toraijin origins such as architectures, artifacts, etc, despite having no direct correlation. The Tōkō Temple (東光院), allegedly founded by the Chiba clan, possesses Korean architecture and elements with many speculating that the temple was originally built by Korean immigrants from Goguryeo or Paekche during the Asuka period. In fact, every year on May 3, a Korea-themed farming band parades through the area and performs the Korean folk dance (Pungmul). Another temple, known as the Kōryū-ji, also possesses a wooden statue of Bodhisattva (Buddha) called the "Hōkan Miroku (宝冠弥勒)", a national treasure of Japan (registered on June 9, 1951); it is believed to have been given from Silla to the Hata clan, the parent clan that built the Kōryū-ji, in the early 7th century. According to Japanese art historian Shuya Ōnishi (大西 修也), the transmitting of the statue is thought to have been a gift from Silla to its own diaspora as Silla produced numerous statues (both wooden and metallic) including the Maitreya in Meditation, a sculpture that is now considered as a sister statue with Japan's Hōkan Miroku, with its signature pose and facial features found only in Silla's craftsmanship. The possession of the statue became crucial evidence for determining the Hata clan's true origin and approximate period of immigration in modern times.

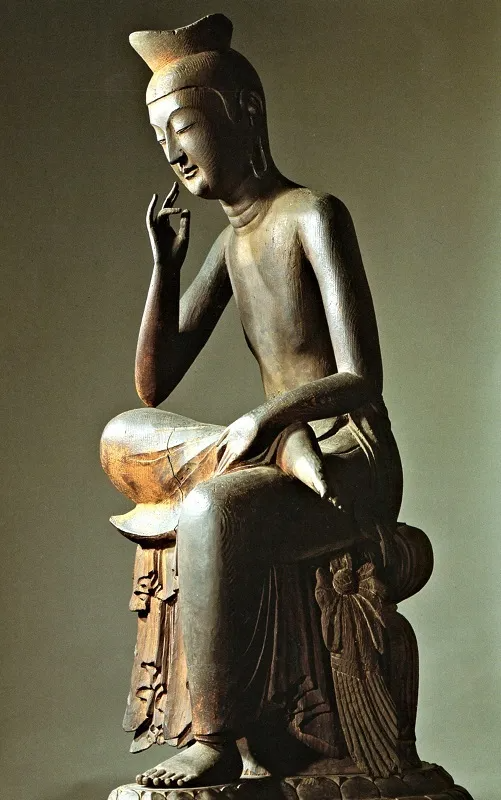
Hōkan Miroku (Kōryū-ji)

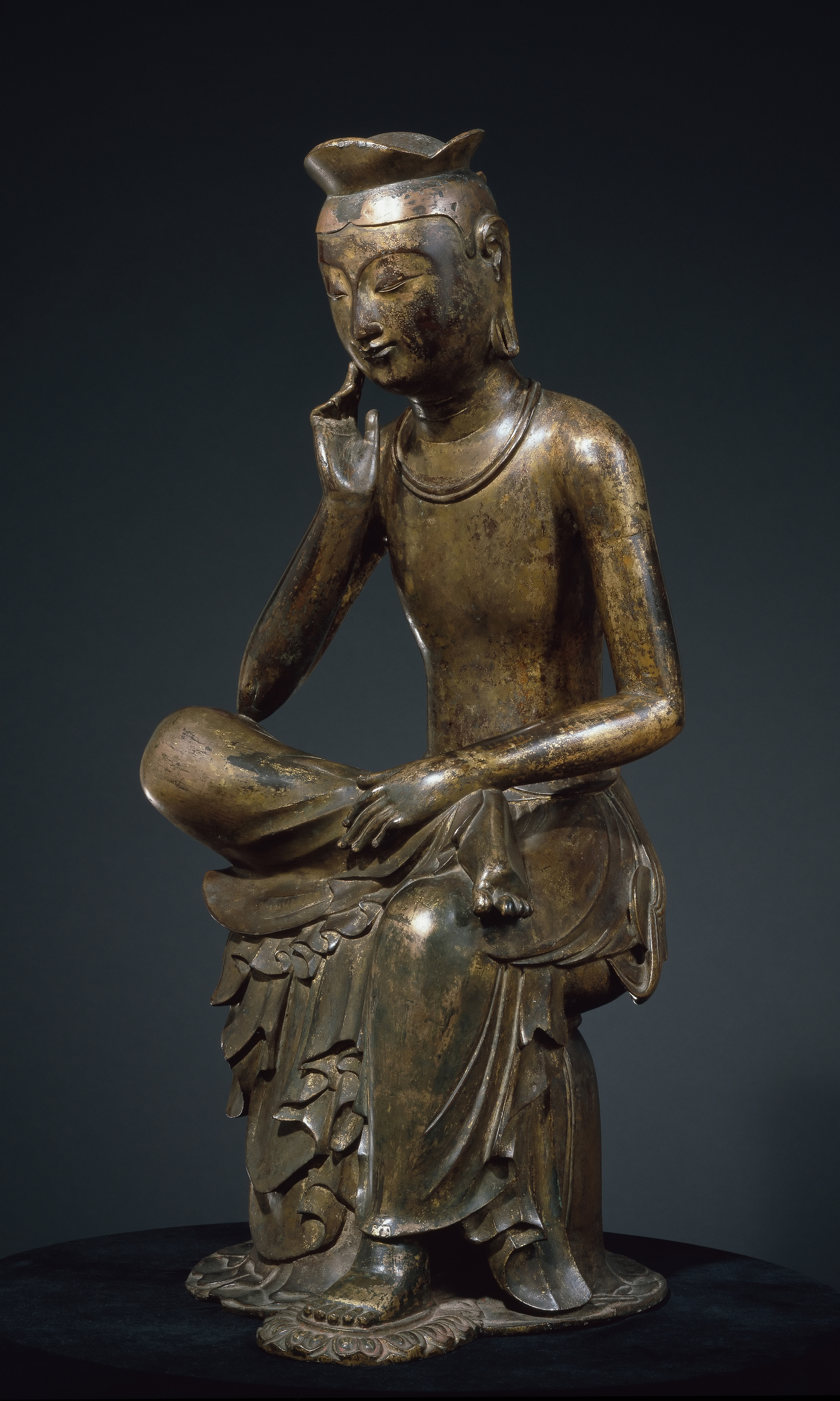
Maitreya in Meditation (Silla)

Other temples such as the Hōryū-ji is also believed to have take much influence from Toraijin after the original building (built in 607) was burnt down and was reconstructed in 670. The temple is thought to have been built by Toraijin from Paekche who brought the temple's sacred artifact and another national treasure of Japan (registered on June 9, 1951), the Kudara Kanon (百済観音; lit. 'Avalokiteśvara of Paekche') similar to the Hōkan Miroku of the Kōryū-ji. In January 2026, the Hōryū-ji temple was chosen as the place to tour during Korea's President Lee Jae Myung's visit with Japan's Prime Minister Sanae Takaichi as Lee wished to visit Takaicihi's hometown of Nara (where the temple is also located), and because the temple's architecture was influenced by Korean culture, signifying the two countries' historical connections.

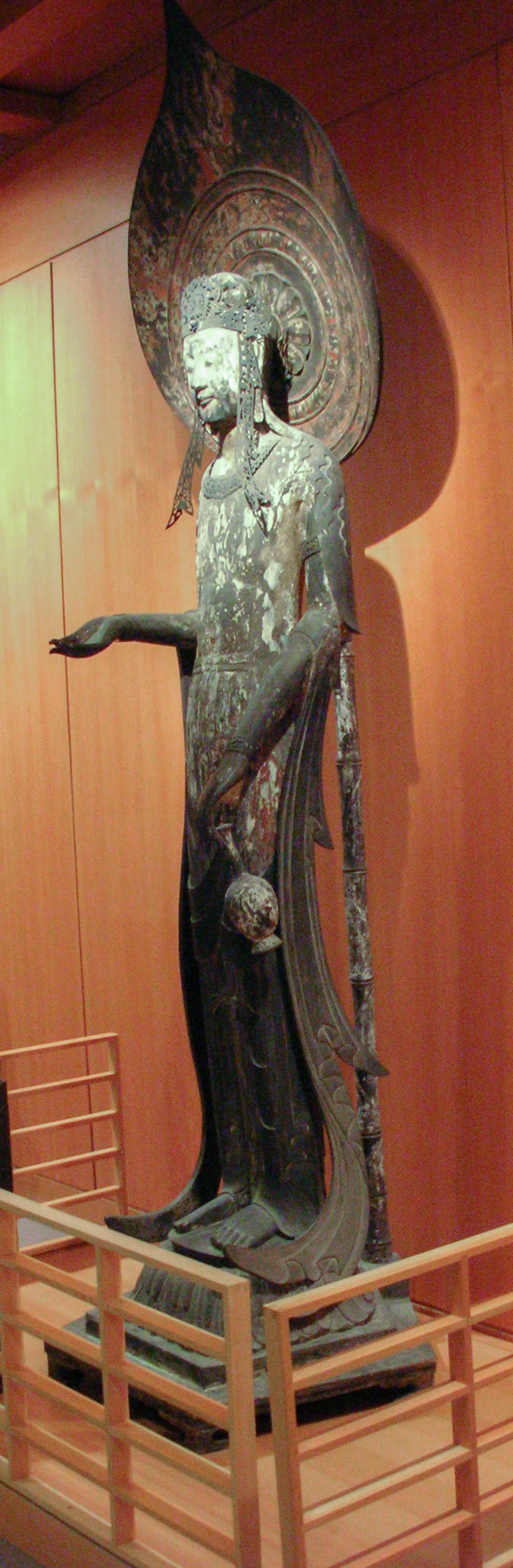
Kudara Kanon (Hōryū-ji)

As such, it is evident that influence from Toraijin is both direct and inert depending on the detail, with some possessing elements such as names that directly allude to Toraijin roots (i.e. Koma for Goguryeo) or having innuendos such as architecture, artifacts, and practices that provide an insight to their likely Toraijin origins.

According to modern Japanese academia, in each major epoch in Japanese history, Toraijin arriving from the Korean peninsula acted as transmitters and transplanters of advanced continental technology and culture to the Japanese archipelago; just as the population groups on the Korean peninsula experienced similar transformations with the arrival of millet and rice agriculture, bronze and iron objects and technologies, and culture and religion from further west and north in the continent.

== History ==
The periods of arrival of the Toraijin can be divided into four categories: 2nd–3rd century BCE, around 5th century BCE (Five kings of Wa's reign), late 5th–6th century, and 7th century.

=== Early periods ===
The early Toraijin, known as the indigenous Jōmon people, were engaged in subsistence based primarily on fishing, hunting, and gathering. Early to middle Jōmon period pottery, known as Sobatashikidoki (曽畑式土器), show significant similarity with the Jeulmun period pottery of Korea not only in the surface patterns, but also in the use of talc mixed into the clay, giving it the signature brownish color. Both styles are part of the bigger Comb Ceramic pottery which is found worldwide (Xinglongwa culture in Northeast China; Comb Ceramic culture in Northeast Europe, etc), however, early Jeulmun and Jōmon styles and their production methods are unique to Korea and Japan. Despite starting similar, Korea's Jeulmun period is believed to have ended much earlier than Japan's Jōmon period (around 500 years) due to the incoming migrants.

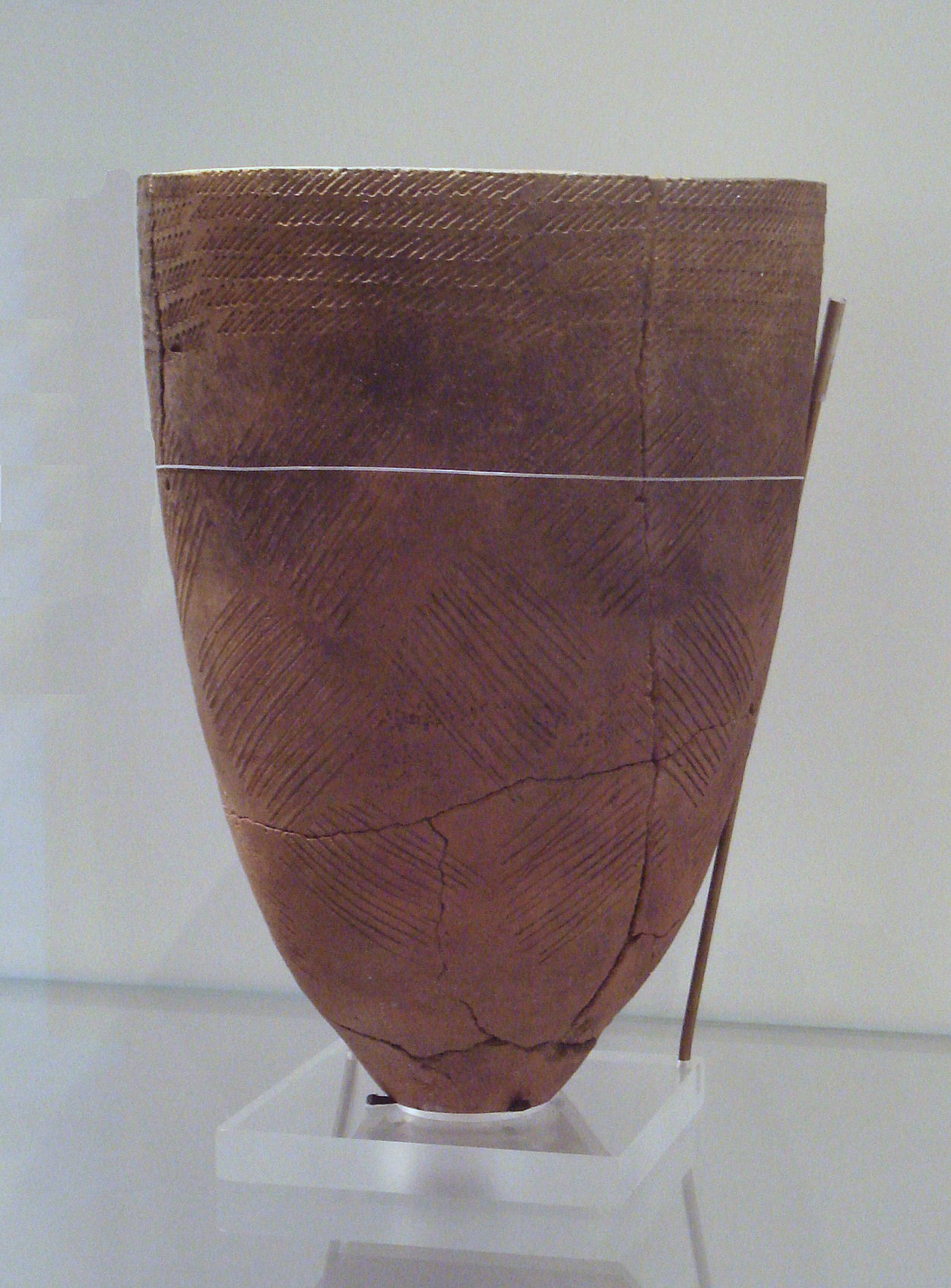
Jeulmun period (c. 8000–1500 BCE) pottery

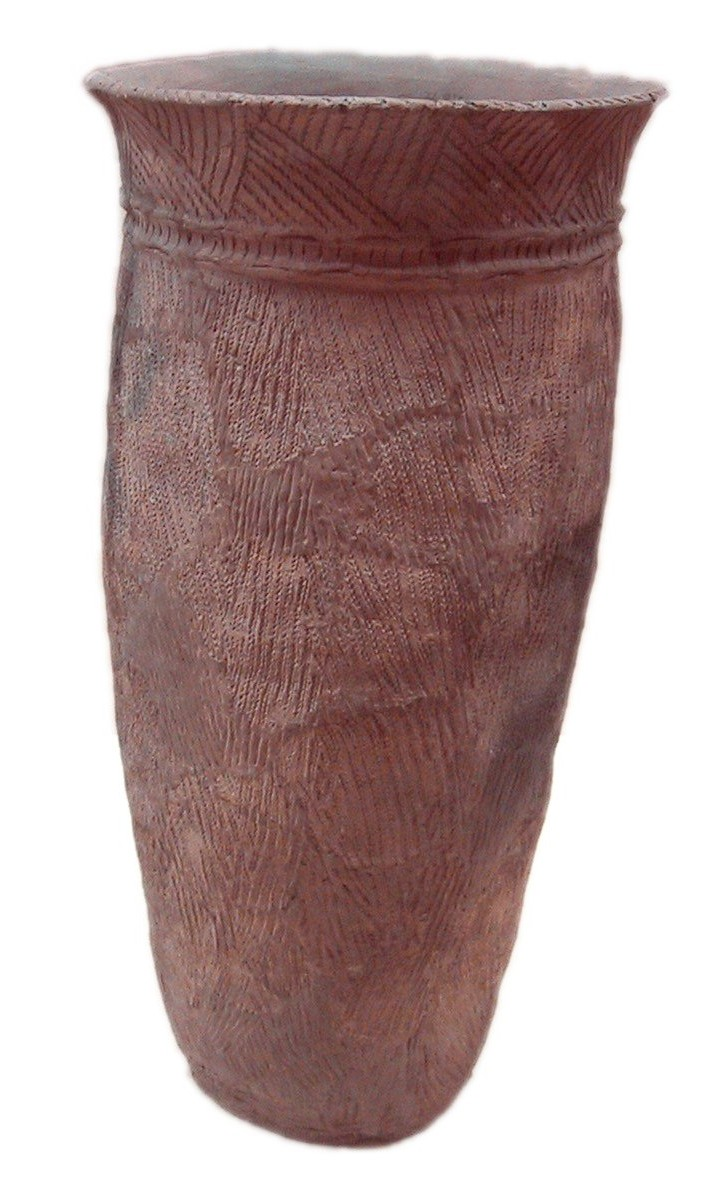
Jōmon period (c. 8000–300 BCE) pottery

After the Jōmon period, a new batch of immigrants arrived in Japan at a time known as the Yayoi period who introduced wet-rice farming to the archipelago. Similar to the Jeulmun–Jōmon style pottery, Yayoi pottery is often associated with the Mumun period pottery of Korea due to the lack of decorations found in the design and for its signature "plain (Korean: 무문; Hanja: 無文; RR: Mumun; lit. 'No decoration')" look. The Mumun people are believed to have replaced the Jeulmun people around 1500 BCE who then migrated to the archipelago which marked the beginning of the Yayoi period of Japan. Similar to the Mumun period being labelled as the "Korean Bronze Age", middle-Yayoi period Toraijin arrived with bronze technology.

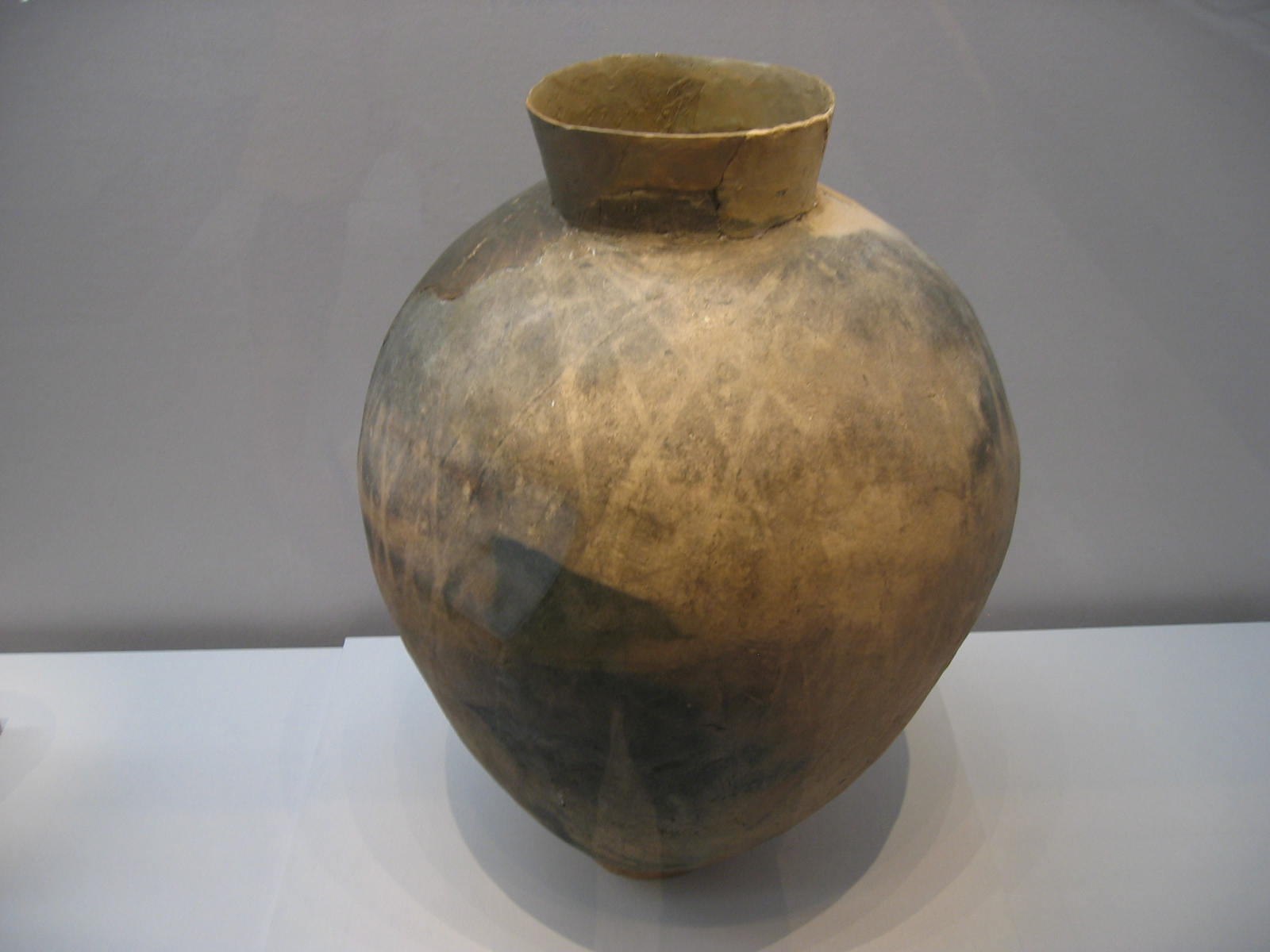
Mumun period (c. 1500–300 BCE) pottery

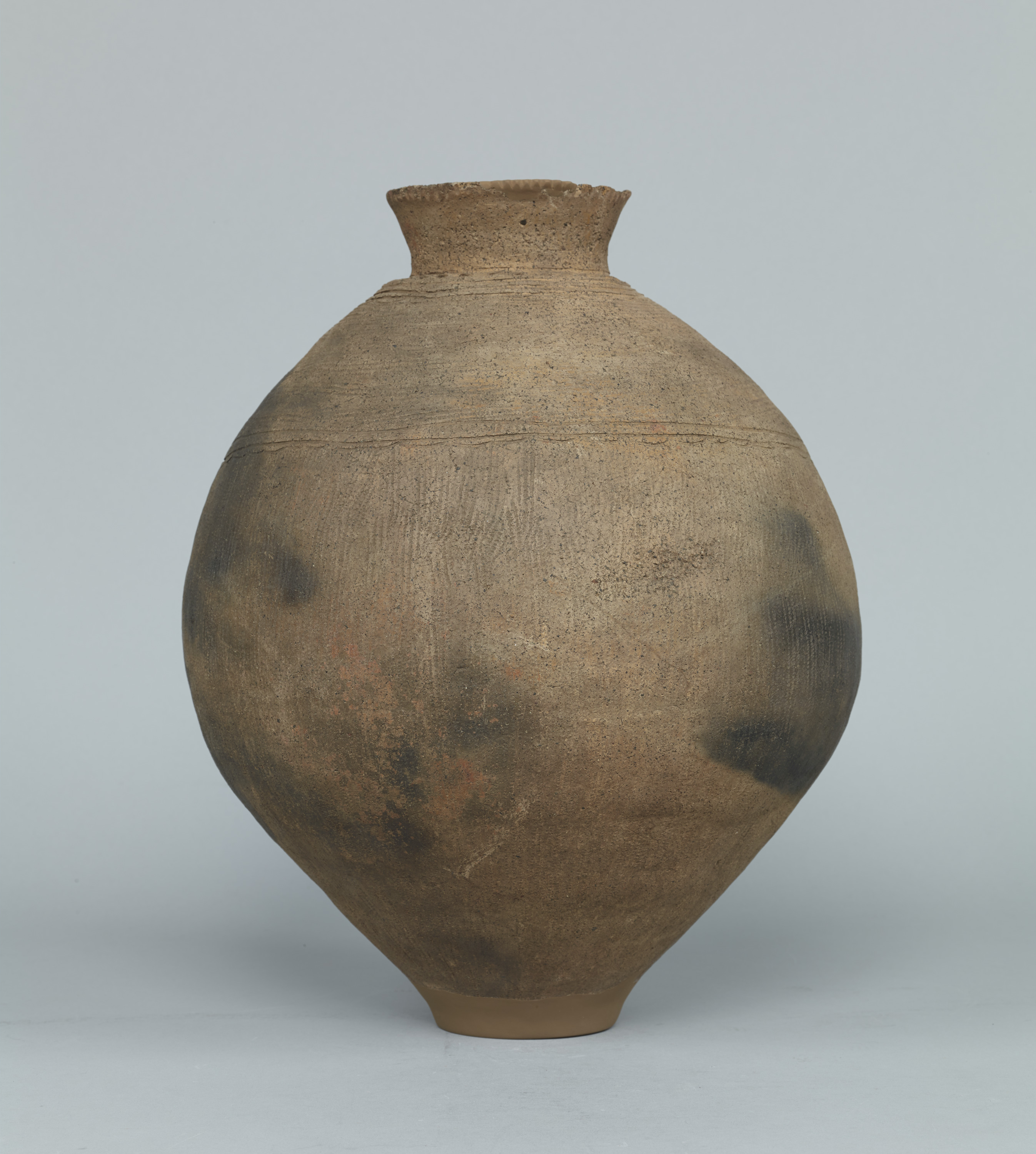
Yayoi period (c. 1000 BCE–300 CE) pottery

The direct descendants of these two groups are believed to have resulted in the Samhan people, an ancient group that possessed many similarities with the contemporary ancient Japanese of Wa. However, due to the constant migration from the north by the Yemaek people, the indigenous Samhan people eventually assimilated with the incoming Yemaek people and became what are known as the Three Kingdoms period Koreans.

=== Kofun period ===
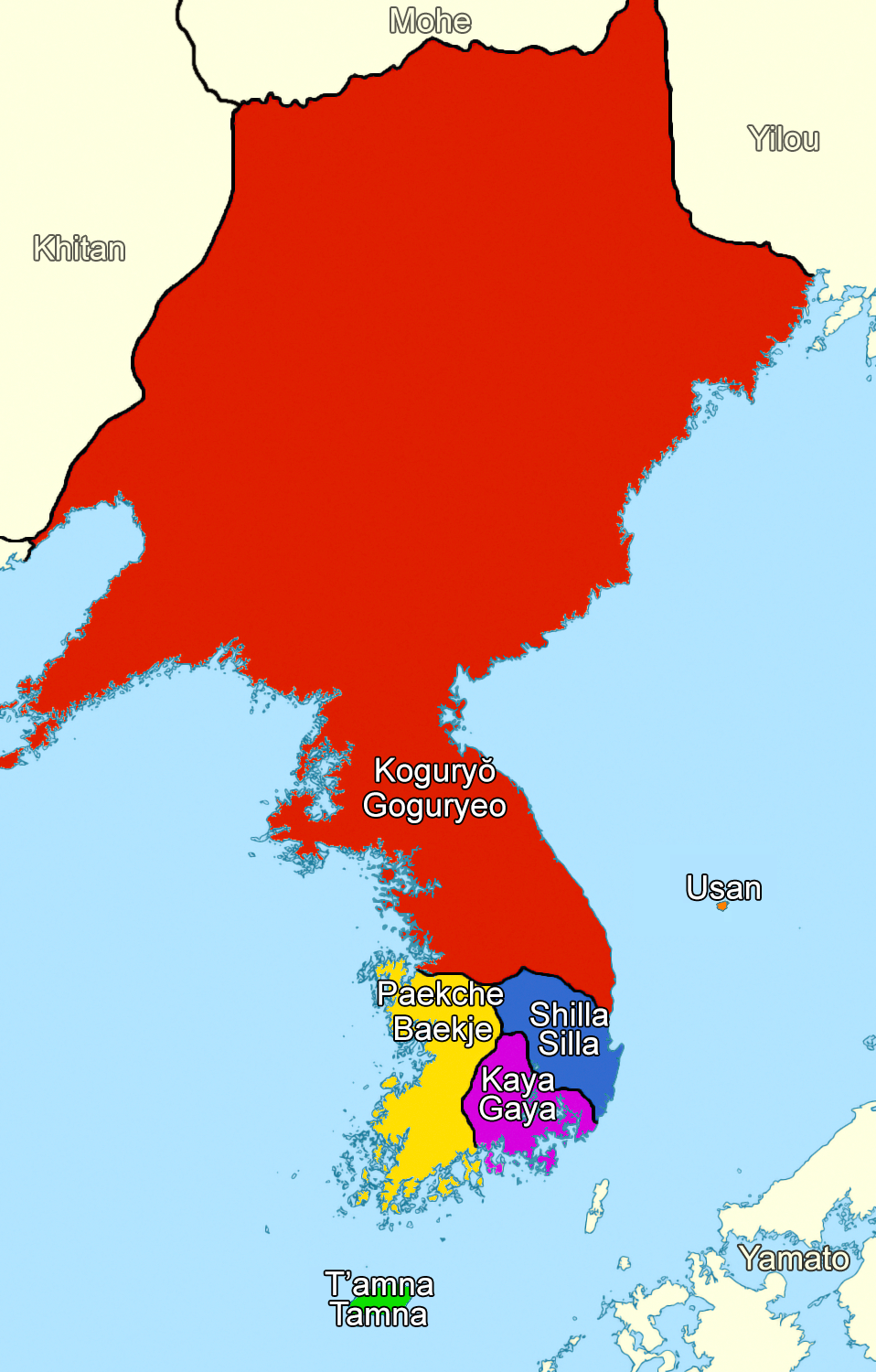
Korea in the mid-late 5th century, middle of the Kofun period. Multiple waves of migration to Japan happened due to constant wars and political unrest.

During the Kofun period and the turbulent Three Kingdoms period of Korea, there were extensive migrations from Korean polities to the Japanese archipelago, particularly from Paekche and Kaya confederacy, both of which developed friendship as well as economic and military alliances with Yamato Kingship. According to the Nihon Shoki and Kojiki, the first major arrival to Japan was during the reign of Emperor Ōjin. Due to a major upheaval on the Korean peninsula at that time, it is believed that many people from the peninsula migrated to Japan to escape the political chaos and subsequently introduced new technology such iron tools, irrigation technology, Chinese knowledge, religions and much more. The tools and technology they brought with them may have revolutionized the production methods and labor patterns that had existed until then. These immigrants from Korea also introduced horses, a foreign species to the archipelago at the time, and horse harnesses. With this, horse riding became a common practice in Japan and were later incorporated into future military purposes.

Minimal travel occurred between the kingdom of Silla and the archipelago owing to a hostile relationship between the Yamato Kingship and Silla, especially after the Silla–Goguryeo and Paekche–Kaya–Wa War. The Wa elites, such as Yamato elites in Kinki, Tsukushi elites in Fukuoka, and Kibi elites in Okayama, sought to establish socio-political advantages in the archipelago and welcomed and integrated the newcomers with peninsular goods and advanced technology. In 552 CE, King Seong of Baekje sent envoys to the Yamato court, bringing Buddha statues and Buddhist classics, and Buddhist culture was also introduced to Japan. After Buddhism was introduced to Japan, it became one of the main religions in Japan and a part of today's Japanese culture.

These immigrants settled and re-established themselves as farmers, iron technicians, horse breeders, merchants and traders, dam builders, craftsmen, among others, earning them the name "Imaki no Tehito (今來才技, “recently arrived skilled artisans”)" in the Nihon Shoki. Groups arriving from the peninsula have settled in and formed communities in various parts of the archipelago, including Fukuoka in northern Kyushu to Okayama on the Inland Sea, to the Kyoto–Osaka– Nara area, to Gunma north of Tokyo, and as far as Sendai in northeastern Honshu. Once fully settled on the Japanese Archipelago, these immigrants became known as "Kikajin", or "naturalized immigrants". While migrants initially settled in Kyushu due to geographic proximity to the peninsula, by the fourth century, migrants had shifted their destination to the Kinki region, the core base of the Yamato elites, of Nara, Osaka, Kyoto, and Otsu region.

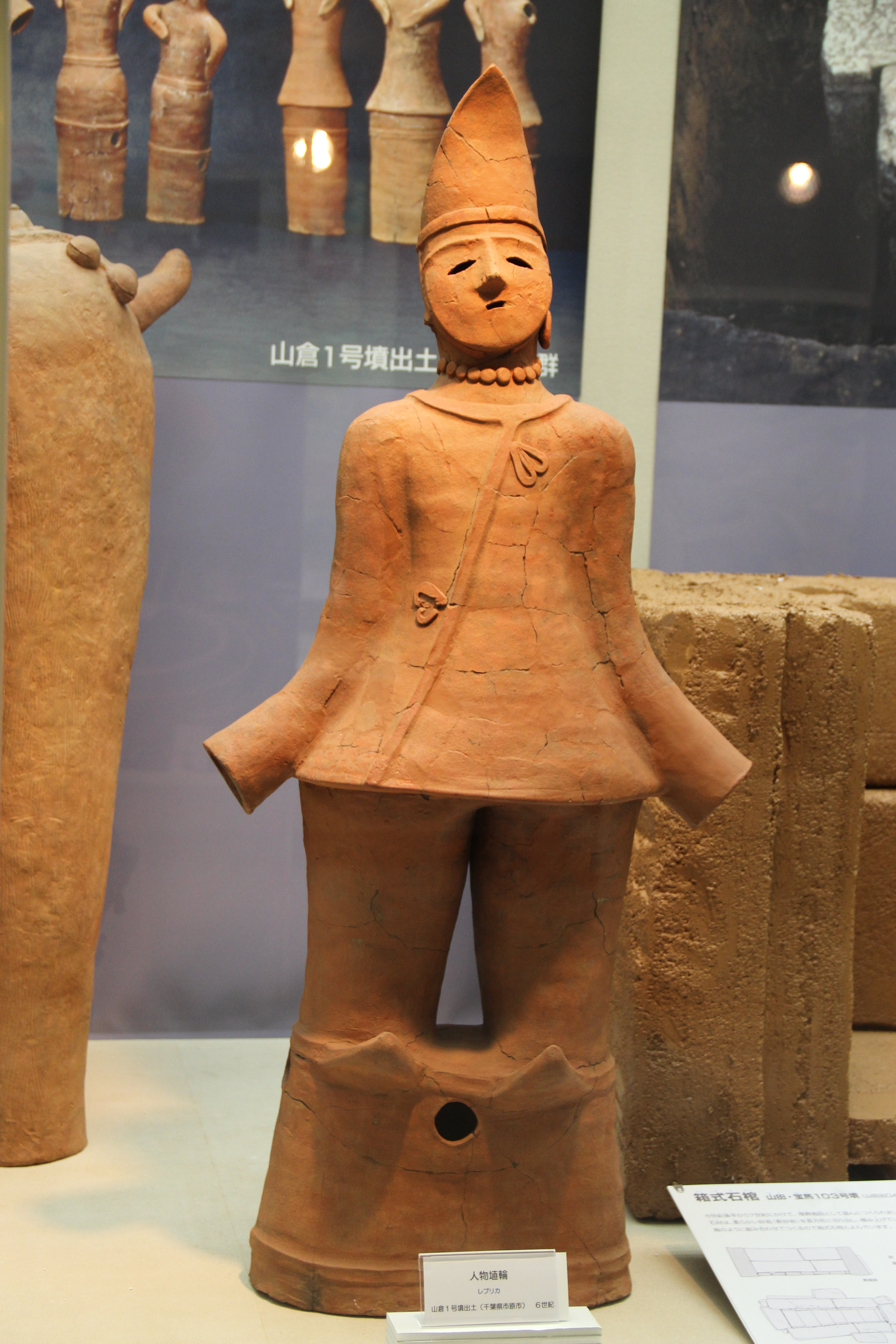
Haniwa depicting a Toraijin from Kaya confederacy during the Kofun period. It is described to be depicting an immigrant due to the long sleeves that were worn by Toraijin at the time.

Anthropologist Torii Ryūzō also recounted the attires worn by Toraijin during Kofun period stating "[the Kofun period Toraijin had unique] customs, including love of swords, skills in bow and arrows, tied hair, beads decorations, long sleeves and baggy pants, leather boots, and daggers on the belt, are exactly what you can find in early northeast Asia. The same can be said about their arrows with feathers and whistling arrowheads." Torii labeled the previous Yayoi group as the "earthly tribe [kunitsu kami; 国津神]" of Japan while labeling the newly introduced Kofun group as the "heavenly tribe [amatsu kami; 天津神]". This sentiment was carried over by a fellow anthropologist, Sadakichi Kita (喜田 貞吉) who associated the "heavenly tribe (Kofun people)" of Japan to the Buyeo people stating that "[...] the incoming heavenly tribe, who conquered, appeased, annexed, and assimilated the existing population and constituted the grand Japanese, were previously residents of a region in the continent. [The Buyeo people] had moved to the Japanese islands at some point."

20th century linguist, Shōzaburo Kanazawa (金沢 庄三郎) even wrote that "the Korean language belongs to the same line of languages as our [Japanese] language. This is a branch of our language, just as the Ryukyu dialect is" in his book Nikkan ryōkokugo dōkeiron (日韓両国語同系論) in 1910, postulating that the "Theory on Japanese‑Korean Common Ancestry", also known as Nissen dōsoron, that was introduced during the Japanese annexation period of Korea was factually correct. Kanazawa essentially categorized the Buyeo people, who were Koreanic speaking Yemaek people, and Kofun period Toraijin as the same ethnic group, predicating that because the Kofun people were a key component of Japanese history, genealogy and therefore identity, the Buyeo people and their language were also inherently Japanese. (Note: However, due to the popular belief that Japan was more sophisticated than Korea at the time, Japanese scholars purposefully evaded claiming that Korea was the main pillar of both groups, but rather, it was propagandized to claim that Korea was the offshoot branch of the bigger Japan-Korea ethnicity. Hence, why Koreans were regarded as being "part" of the Japanese race, and not vice versa.) Regardless of the macro-ethnocentric position taken by Imperial Japan in regards to Korea at the time, a similar conclusion was drawn over a century later in 2022 supporting that even linguistically, Japonic and Koreanic speakers were indeed heavily related.

National Museum of Nature and Science held a special exhibition in May 2025 that revolved around the genetic makeup of the Japanese surrounding specific periods. The director of the museum stated that the majority of the relics found during the Kofun period bore heavy resemblance with those found in Korea. He also emphasized that the immigrants who brought new technology entered after the late-Yayoi period and are considered as main contributors to the modern Japanese people's genetic makeup.

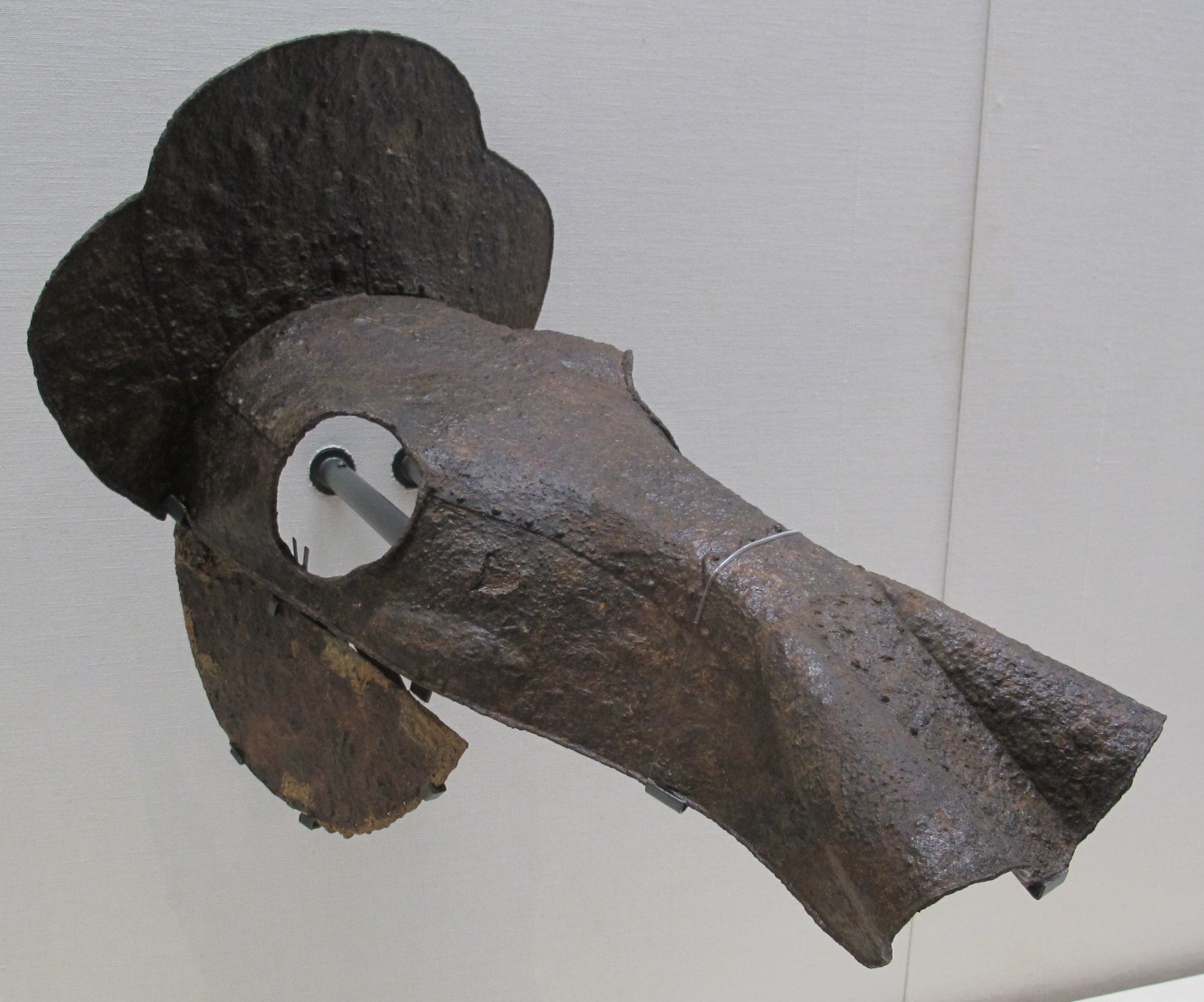
Kofun period horse armor

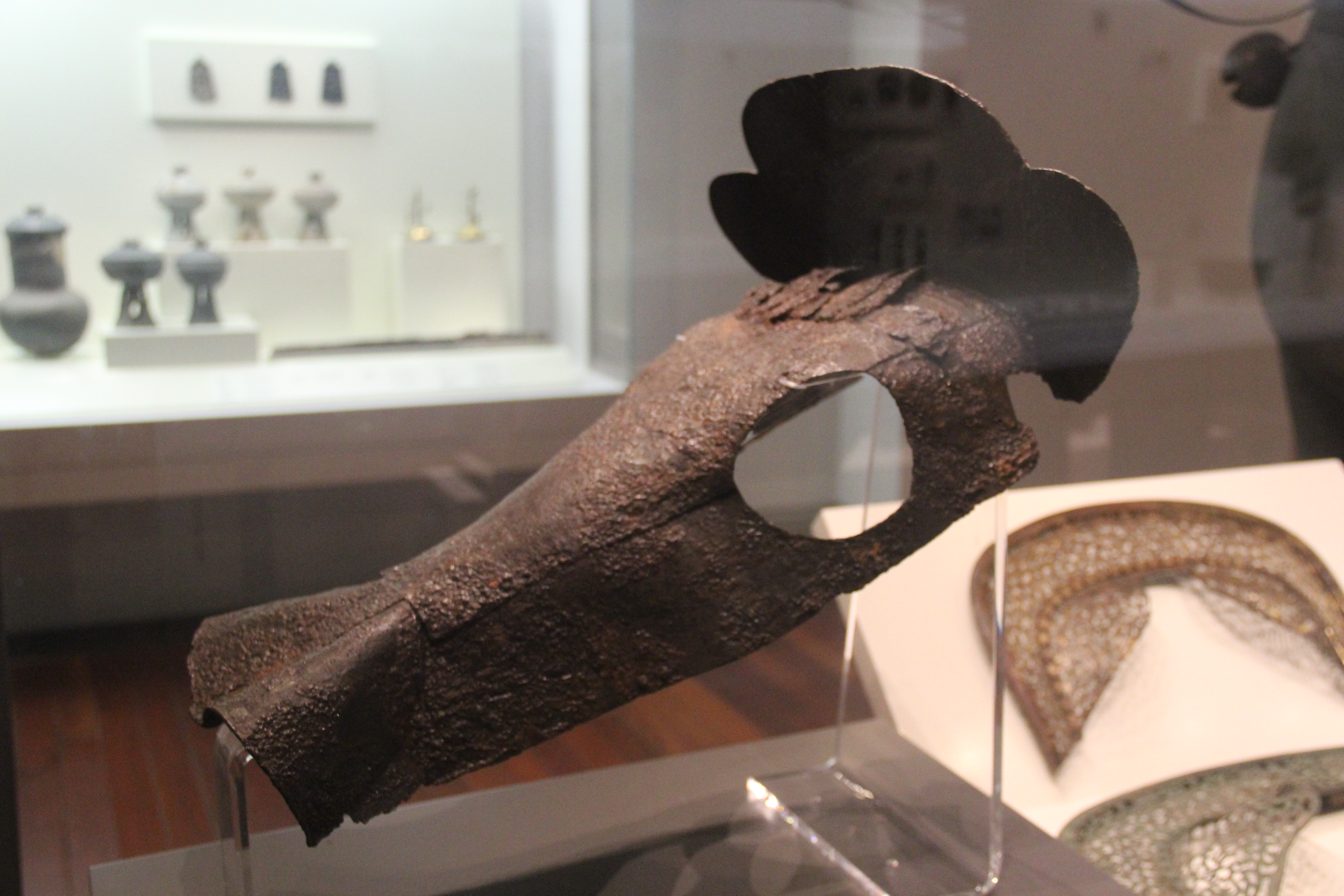
Kaya confederacy period horse armor

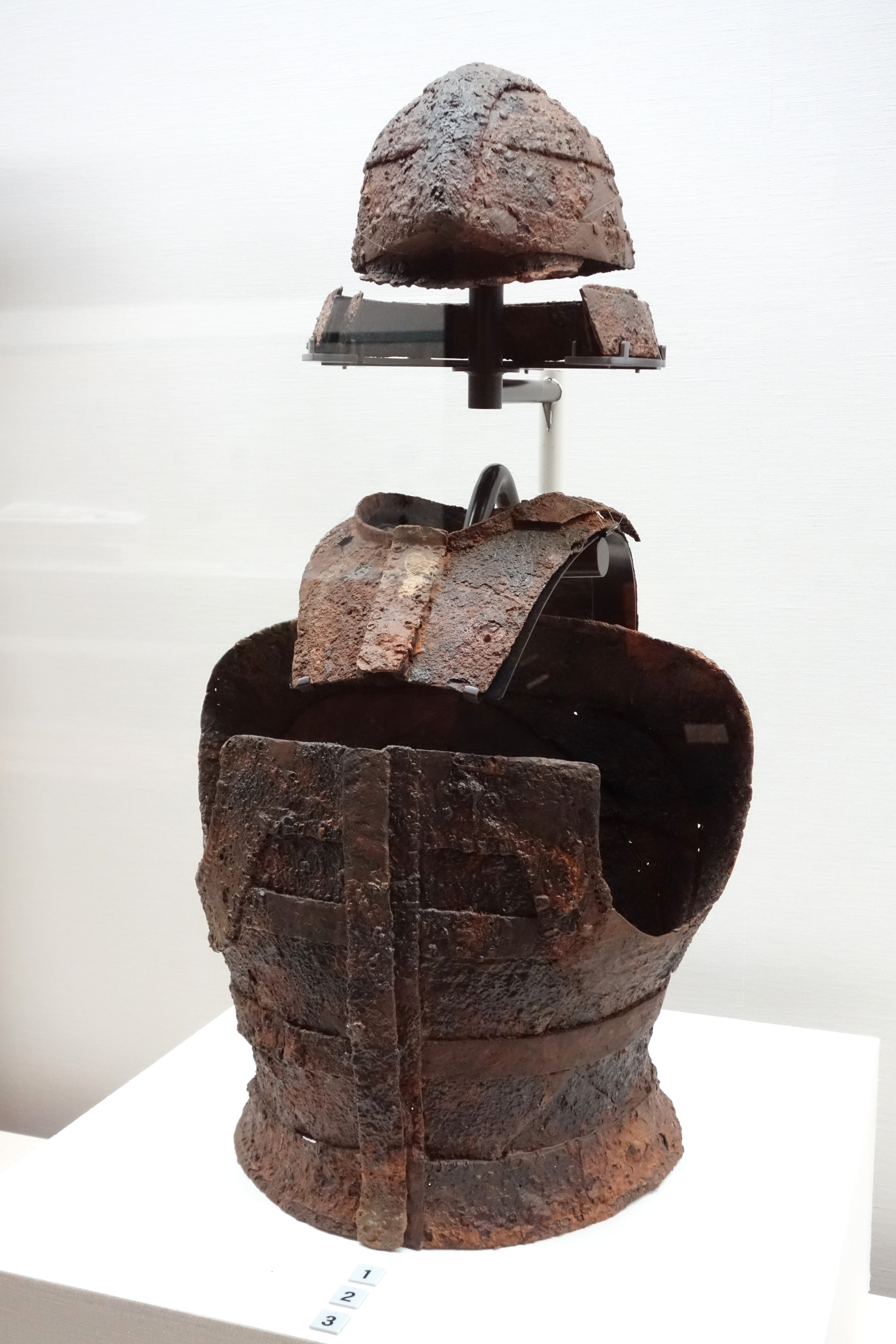
Kofun period armor

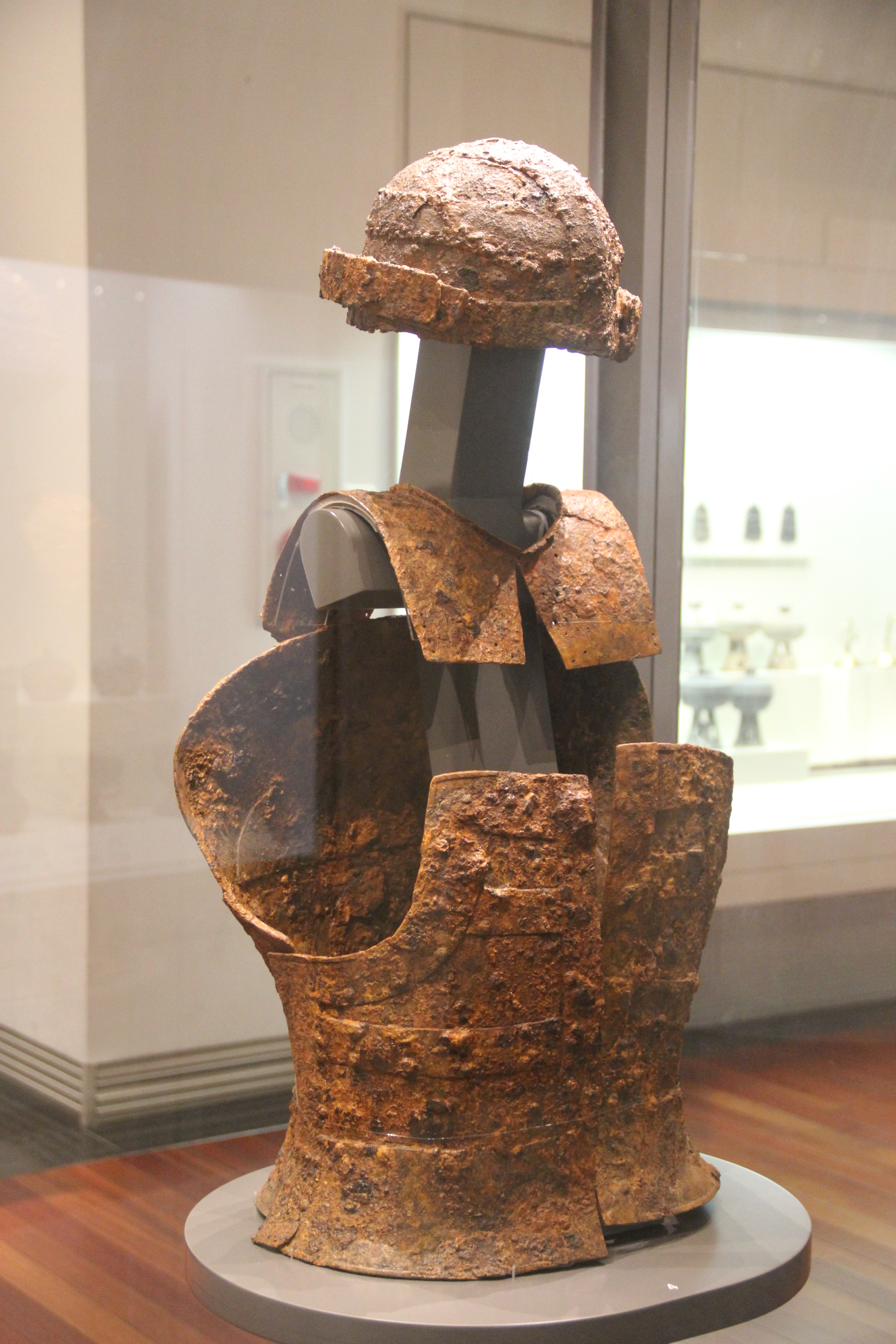
Kaya confederacy period armor

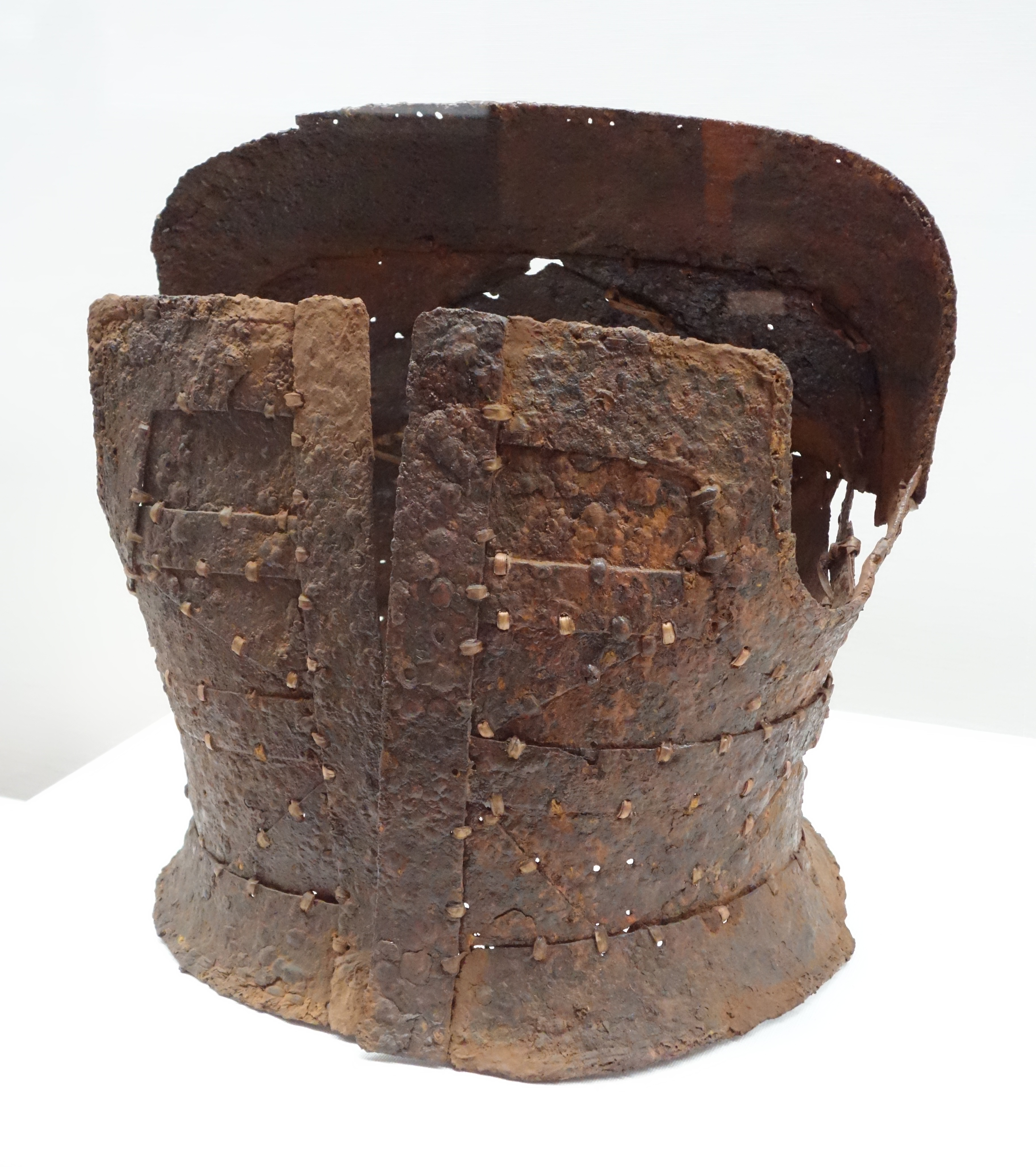
Kofun period armor

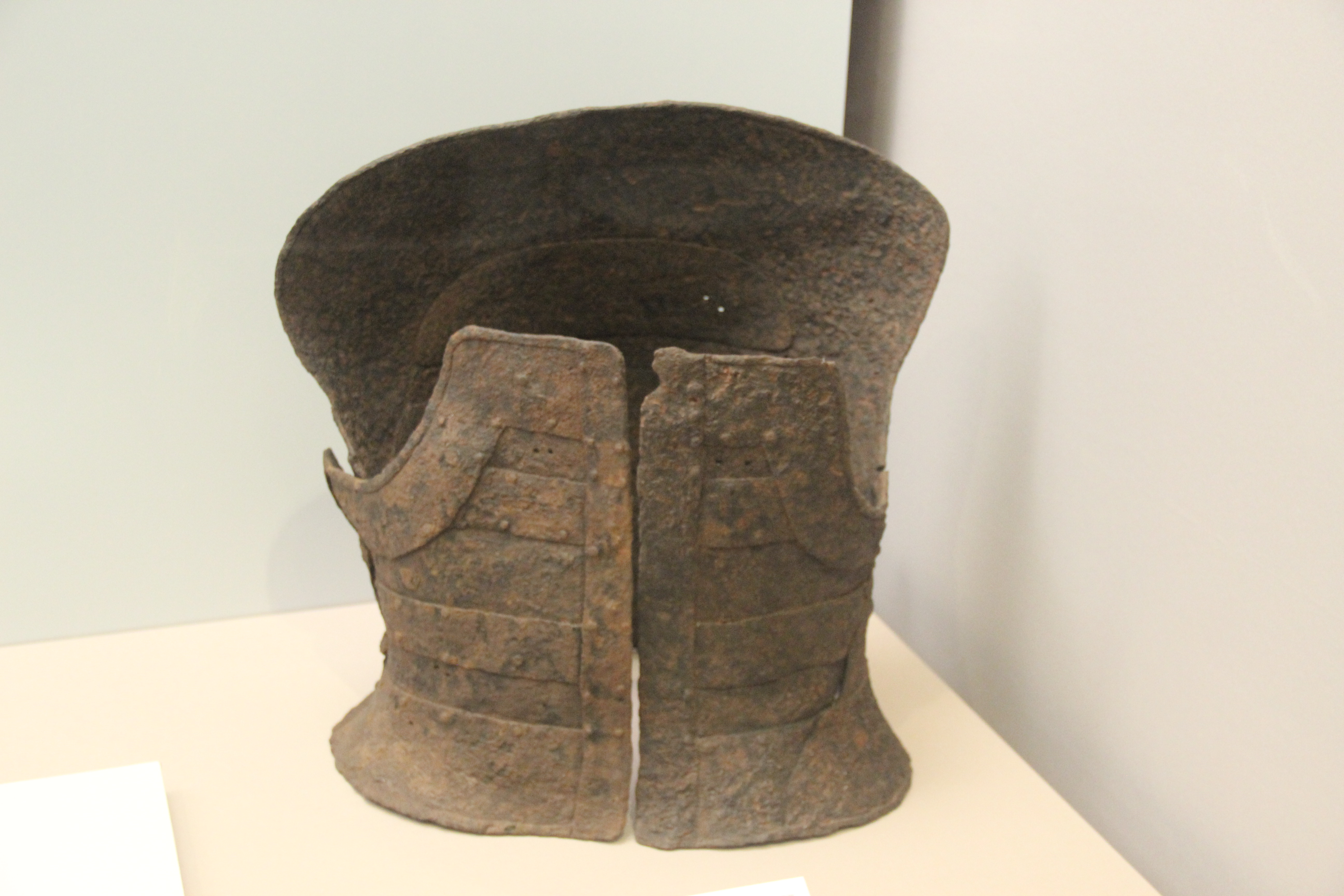
Paekche period armor

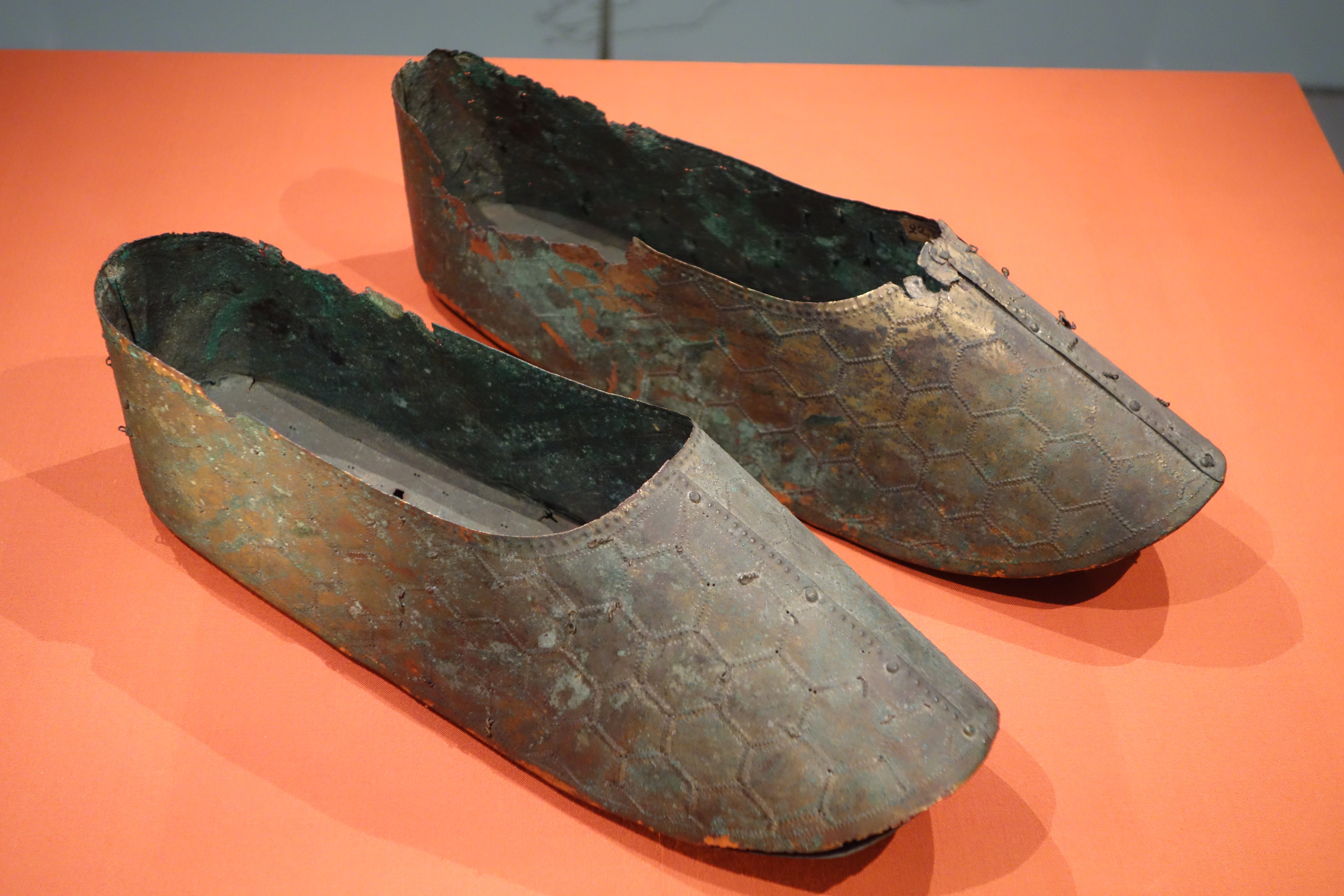
Kofun period gilt bronze slippers

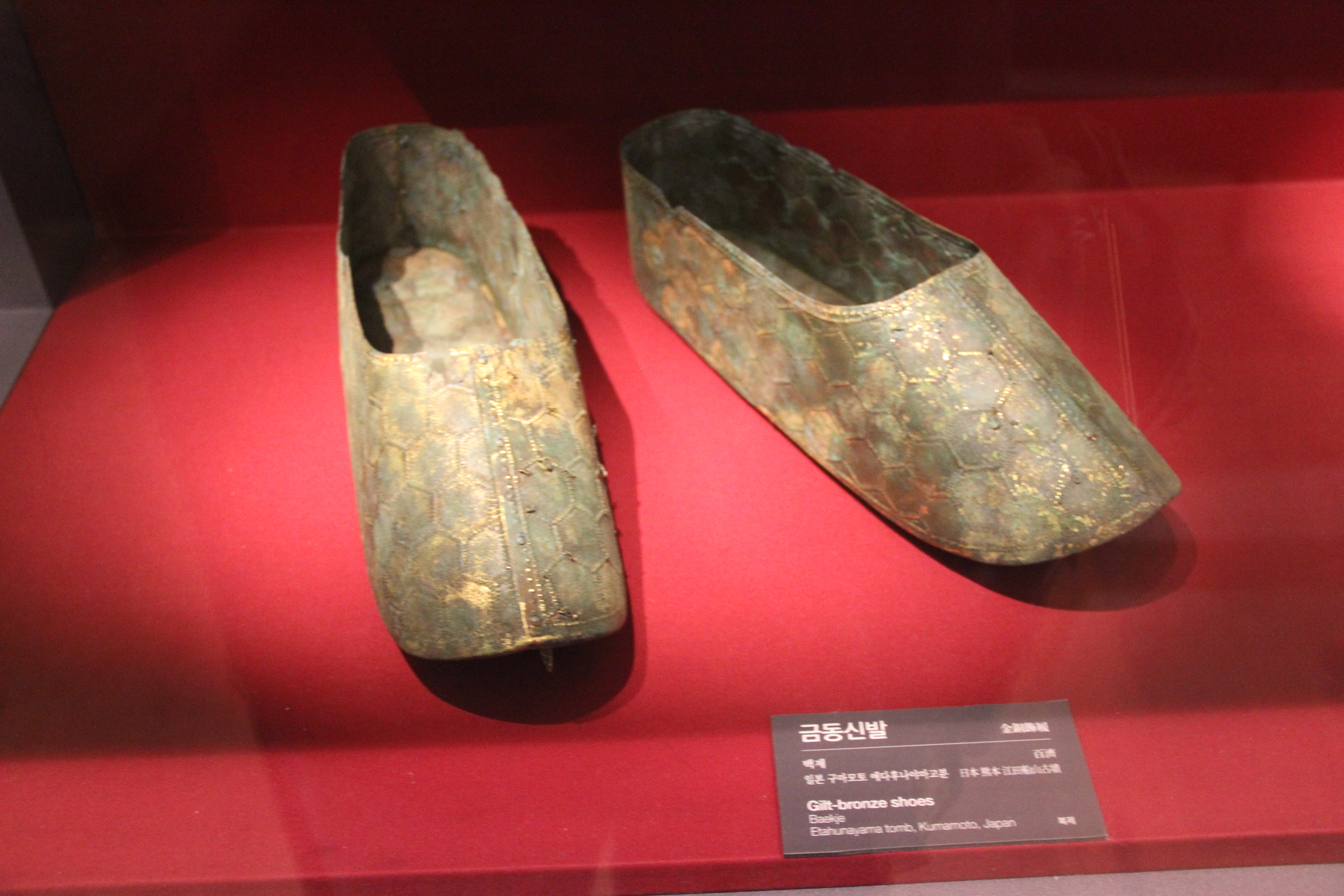
Paekche period gilt bronze slippers

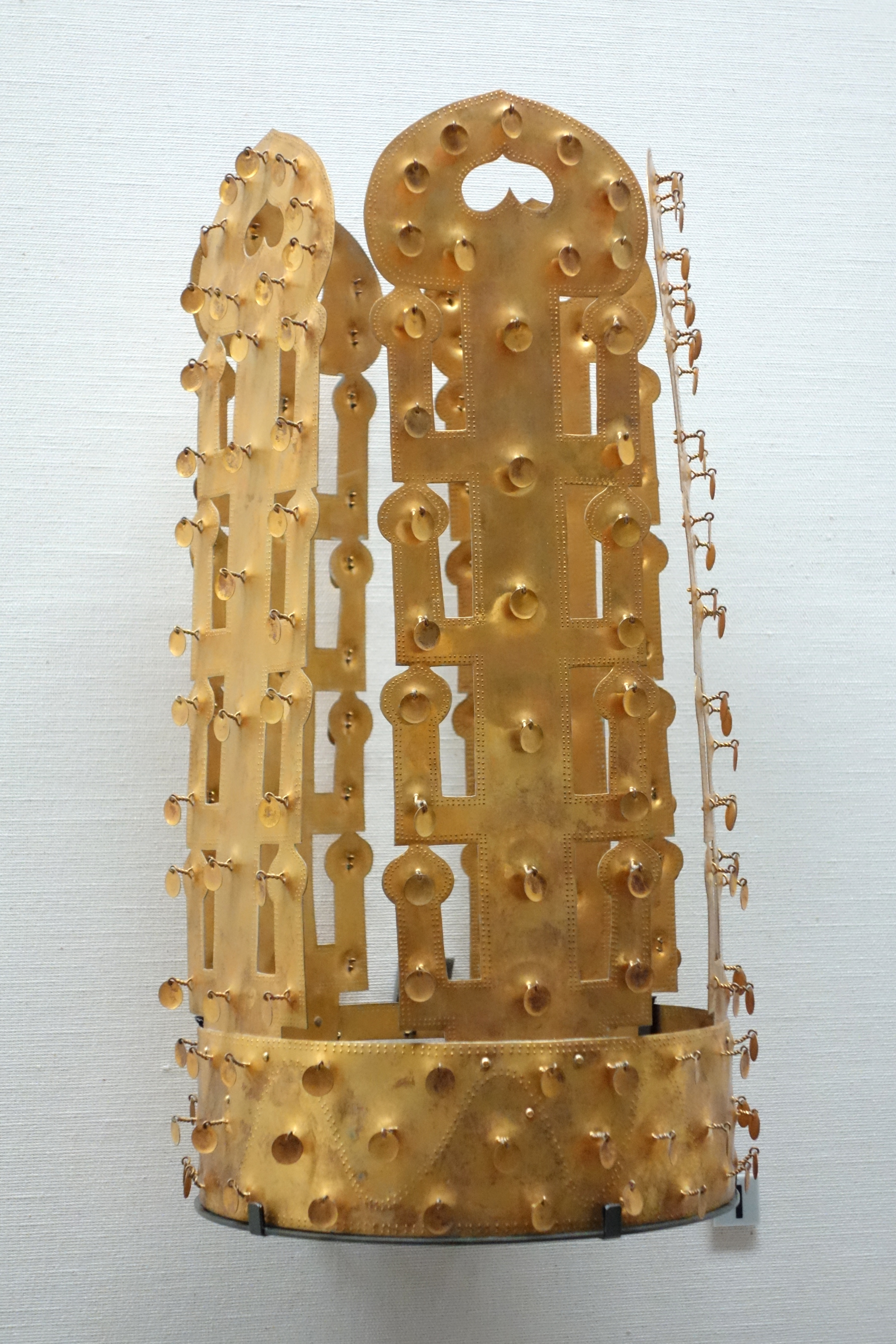
Kofun period crown

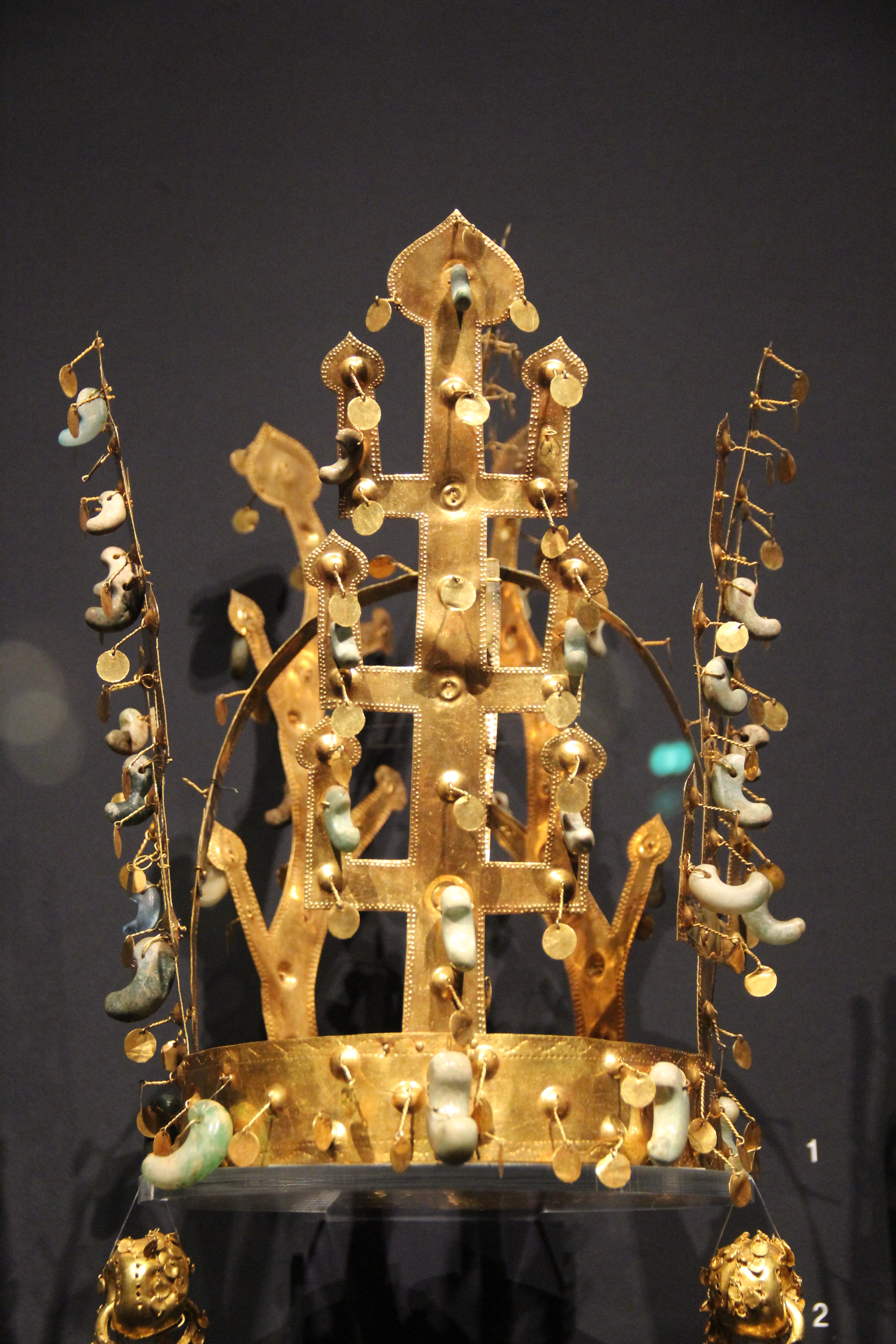
Silla period crown

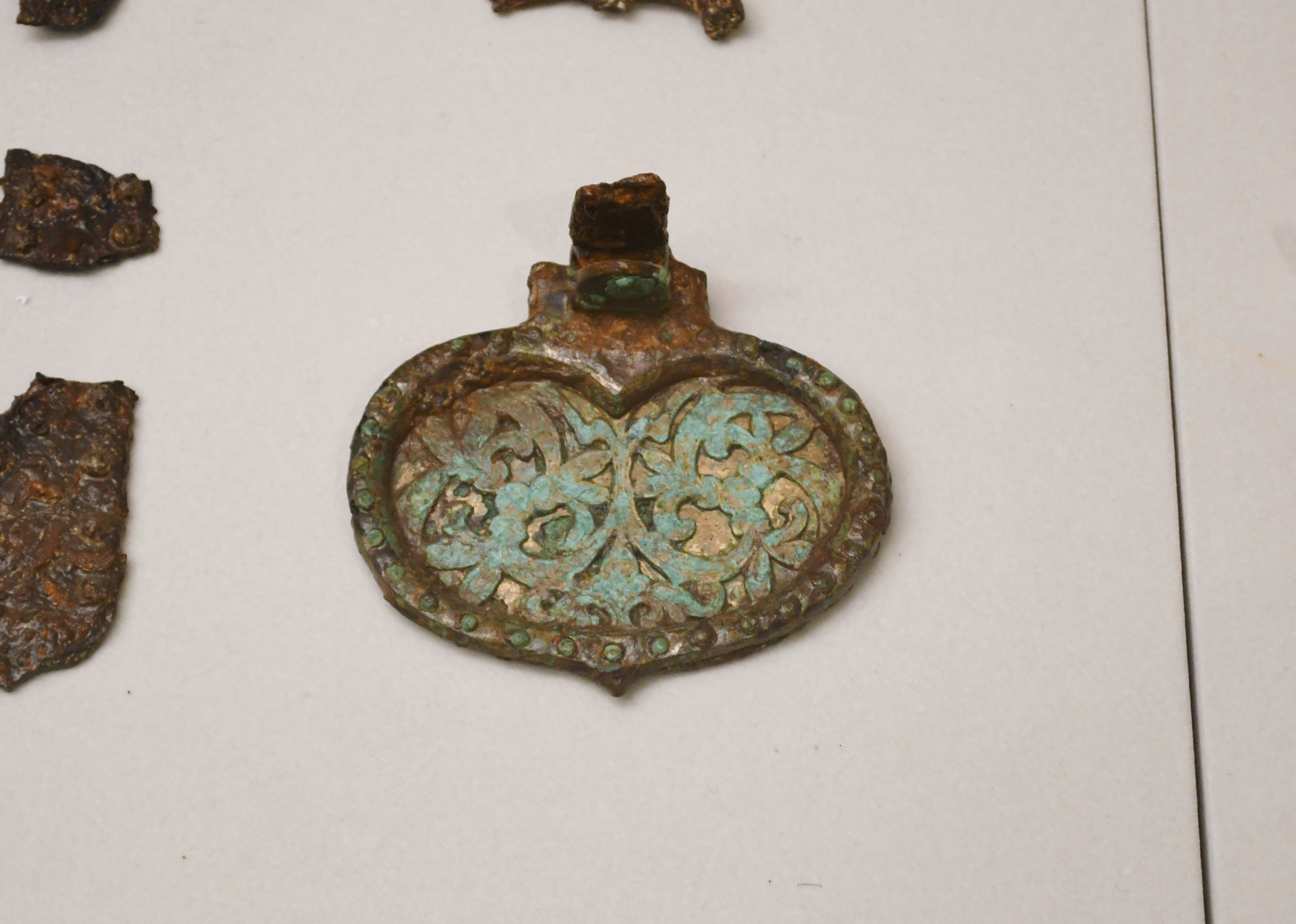
Kofun period ornament

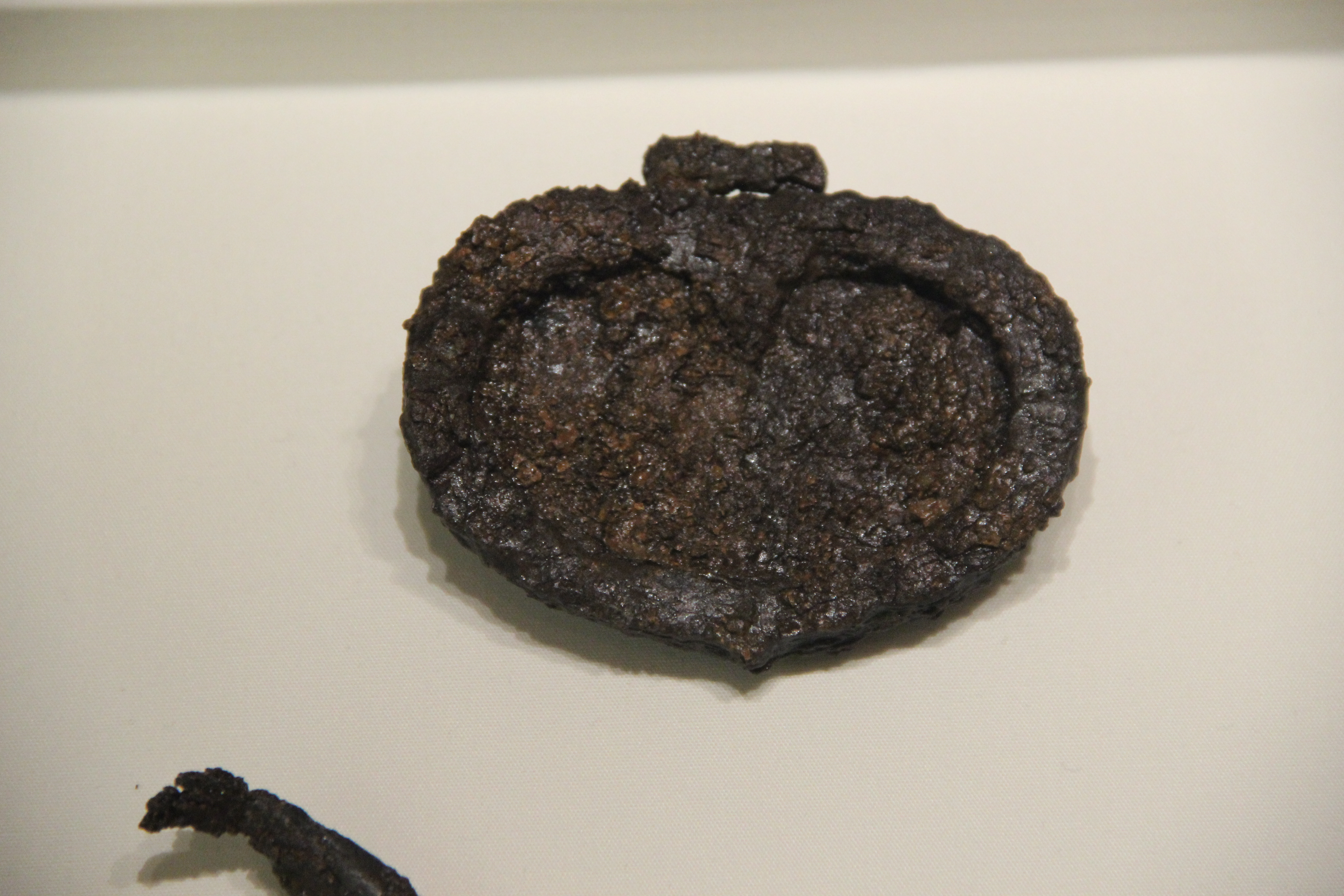
Goguryeo period ornament

These new waves of immigrants from Korea continued well into the Asuka period. However, their influence is believed to have reached its peak during the Kofun period and slowly fell off afterward with numbers dwindling over time. Since then, Japan and its demographics began to homogenize from that point on.

=== Asuka period ===
After entering the Asuka period, many Japanese royals and ministers believed in Buddhism, such as Prince Shōtoku and Soga Mako, and devoted themselves to promoting Buddhism. The reason why Paekche people went to Japan was that Japan asked Paekche for craftsmen and doctors of the Five Classics and escaped from Goguryeo.

In the 7th century, exiles from Paekche, which had been defeated at the Battle of Baekgang, entered Japan. The technology and culture brought by the Toraijin contributed to the advanced development of Japan at that time. Toraijin occupied an important position in the military and political affairs of the Yamato regime due to their advanced skills in arms manufacturing, weaving, and agriculture. They also made significant contributions to the development of Japanese culture.

『日本餘噍 據扶桑以逋誅』

"The refugees of Ilbon (日本; referring to Paekche) safely retreated with the help of Busang Kingdom (扶桑; referring to Japan) from the invaders (Silla–Tang alliance)."

— Excerpt from "Yegun's Epithaph", 678 CE

It is believed that the Toraijin refugees from Paekche also brought nationalistic ideology as well.

Historically, up until the Yamato Kingdom changed its name from "Wakoku (倭国)" then "Yamato (ヤマト)" to "Nihon (日本)", Paekche had used the same characters "Ilbon (日本)", literally meaning "Land where the sun rises" (no relations to Japan) when it colloquially addressed itself (as seen in Yegun, a Paekche nationalist and loyalist of King Uija, in his epitaph), seeming to have carried over the meaning of "Morning Land" from Asadal. Believed to have been created around 678 CE, the epitaph is the oldest account in East Asian history to have used the term "Land where the sun rises (日本)" (Wang 2011; Tono 2012).

== Notable Toraijin clans ==
The Yamato basin was the home of powerful clans with Toraijin connections, such as the Soga clan with Paekche affiliation and which emerged as the most powerful clan in the Yamato by the middle of 6th century, and the Yamato no Aya clan with roots in the Kaya confederacy and Paekche.

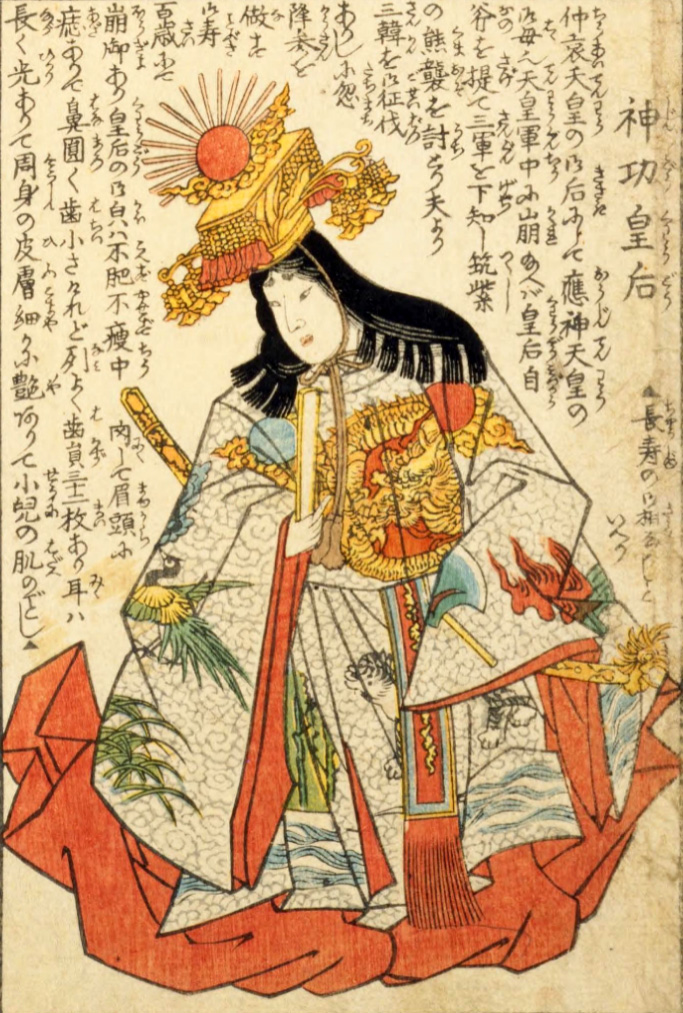
Empress Jingū was of Silla descent through Amenohiboko (Tajima clan).

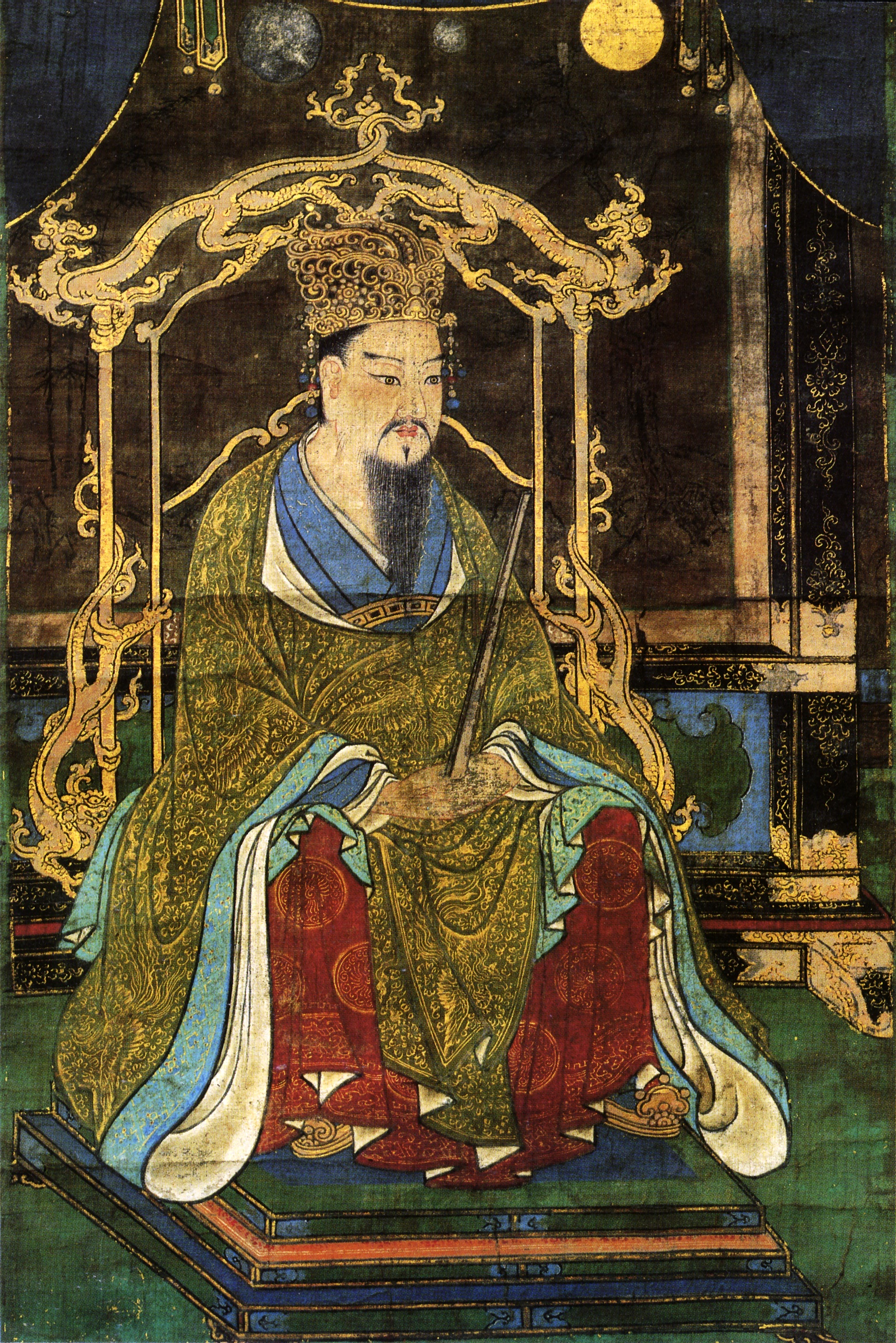
Emperor Kanmu was of Paekche descent through Takano no Niigasa (Yamato no Fuhito clan).

Influential Toraijin clans with imperial ties included the Tajima clan (多遅摩氏) of Silla descent, as well as Kudara no Konikishi clan and Yamato no Fuhito clan, both of Paekche descent. During the 3rd or 4th century, Amenohiboko, a prince from Silla and also a Toraijin, immigrated to Japan and became the ancestor to Empress Jingū while founding the Tajima clan. Early in the eighth century, Lady Takano no Niigasa, a member of the Yamato no Fuhito clan and a descendant of Muryeong of Baekje, married Prince Shirakabe (the future Emperor Kōnin) and gave birth to Yamanobe in 737 in Nara, who was enthroned in 781 and became Emperor Kanmu.

Families such as the Tatara clan became the parent house of powerful clans such as the Ōuchi clan.

Other representative Toraijin groups of the 4th and 5th centuries were the Hata clan, and the Kawachinofumi clan (西文氏). These Toraijin possessed superior technology and ability, and were fundamental to Japan's nation-building. The Hata clan is descended from Yuzuki no Kimi, who came from Silla on the Korean Peninsula around the 4th or 5th century. Yuzuki no Kimi came to Kyushu with 30,000 to 40,000 laborers from 127 prefectures. They served the Yamato royal court as officials in charge of finances. His headquarters was originally located in Yamaboshi, Kyoto, but he later moved to Uzumasa (Kyoto City). Along with their activities in the center of Japan, the descendants of the Hata extended their influence nationwide, from Owari and Mino to Bicchu and Chiku.

- Aya clan (Paekche/Kaya)
- Hata clan (Silla)
- Koma clan (Goguryeo)
- Kudara no Konikishi clan (Paekche)
- Ōtomo clan (Silla)
- Ōuchi clan (Paekche/Kaya)
- Tatara clan (Kaya)
- Toyoda clan (Paekche)
- Yamato no Fuhito clan (Paekche)

== Famous Toraijin figures ==
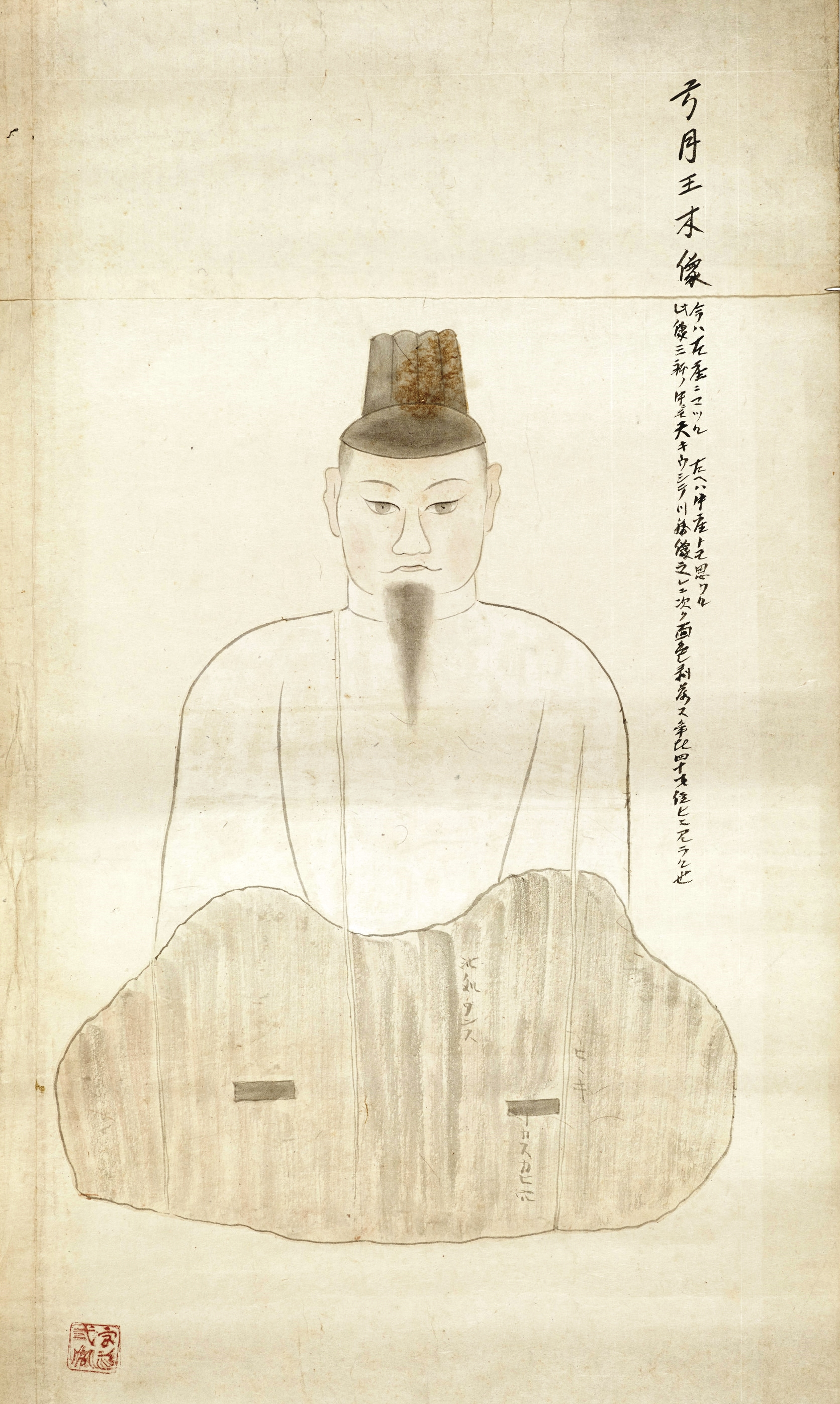
Yuzuki no Kimi of Paekche.

- Achi no Omi – Founder of the Yamato no Aya clan.
- Amenohiboko – Founder of the Tajima clan. Ancestor of god of sweets, Tajimamori and Empress Jingū.
- Buyeo Pung – Last heir of Paekche and brother of Zenkō, founder of the Kudara no Konikishi clan.
- Prince Imseong – Founder of the Ōuchi clan.
- Irigumo of Kaya – Founder of the Tatara clan.
- Mantoku no Omi – Founder of the Ōtomo clan.
- Prince Junda – Founder of the Yamato no Fuhito clan.
- Mokuto-Ō – Founder of the Oka no Muraji clan.
- Takano no Niigasa – Family of the Yamato no Fuhito clan. Mother of Emperor Kanmu.
- Wani – Founder of the Kawachinofumi clan.
- Yuzuki no Kimi – Founder of the Hata clan.

Suspected individuals:

- Fujiwara no Kamatari(?) – Founder of the Fujiwara clan. Suspected to be a Toraijin and may even be Buyeo Pung.
- Takenouchi no Sukune(?) – Father to founders of Toraijin clans such as Hata no Yashiro (Hata clan) and Soga no Ishikawa (Soga clan). Descendants include "Soga no Karako (蘇我韓子)", meaning "Korean person of Soga" and his son, Soga no Koma, meaning "Goguryeo person of Soga" of the Soga clan. Suspected to be a Toraijin.

== Toraijin gods ==
Many deities, known as kami in Japan, are believed to have been introduced by Toraijin as well.

=== Shinra Myōjin ===
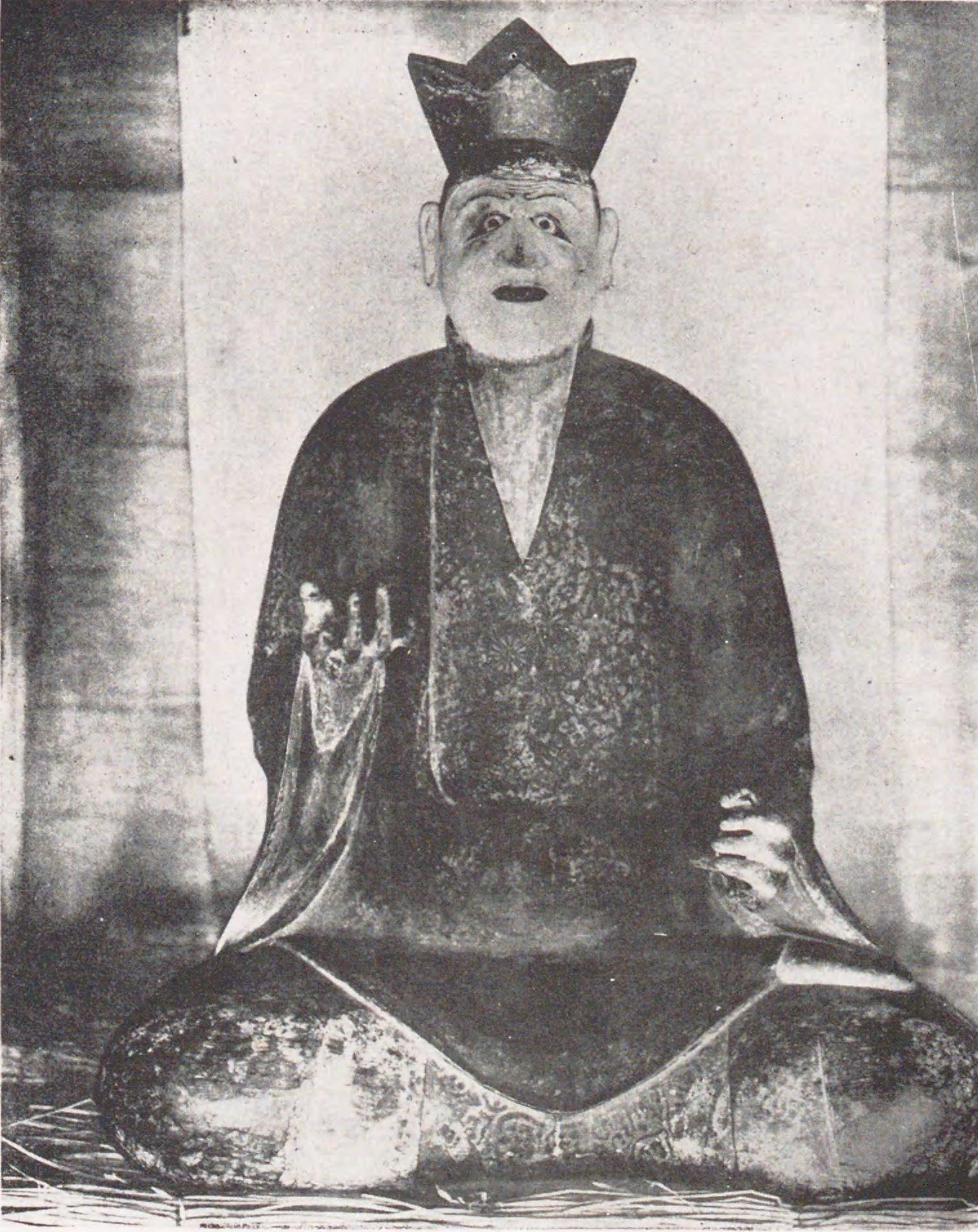
A statue of Shinra Myōjin, the kami from Silla.

It is said that the history of the Ōtomo clan, a clan from Silla, was heavily intertwined with Shinra Myōjin (lit. 'Shining deity of Silla'), a Buddhist god associated with the Jimon branch of Tendai, a school of Japanese Buddhism. His name is derived from the name of a historical Korean kingdom, Silla.

Professor Sujung Kim (김수정) at DePauw University of religious studies who specializes in history of Buddhism in East Asia, claims that the Ōtomo clan's special ties to deities such as the Shinra Myōjin may provide an insight to the clan's possible origins.

It is said that the Ōtomo clan was one of the earliest clans to commemorate Shinra Myōjin and was involved in promoting the veneration of said deity. Kim posited that the Shinra Myōjin originally being a Silla god sheds light on the possibility of the clan being Silla immigrants as it was common for immigrants from specific regions to be left with commemorating gods from the same origins as seen with the Hata clan and the kami Inari.

=== Inari ===
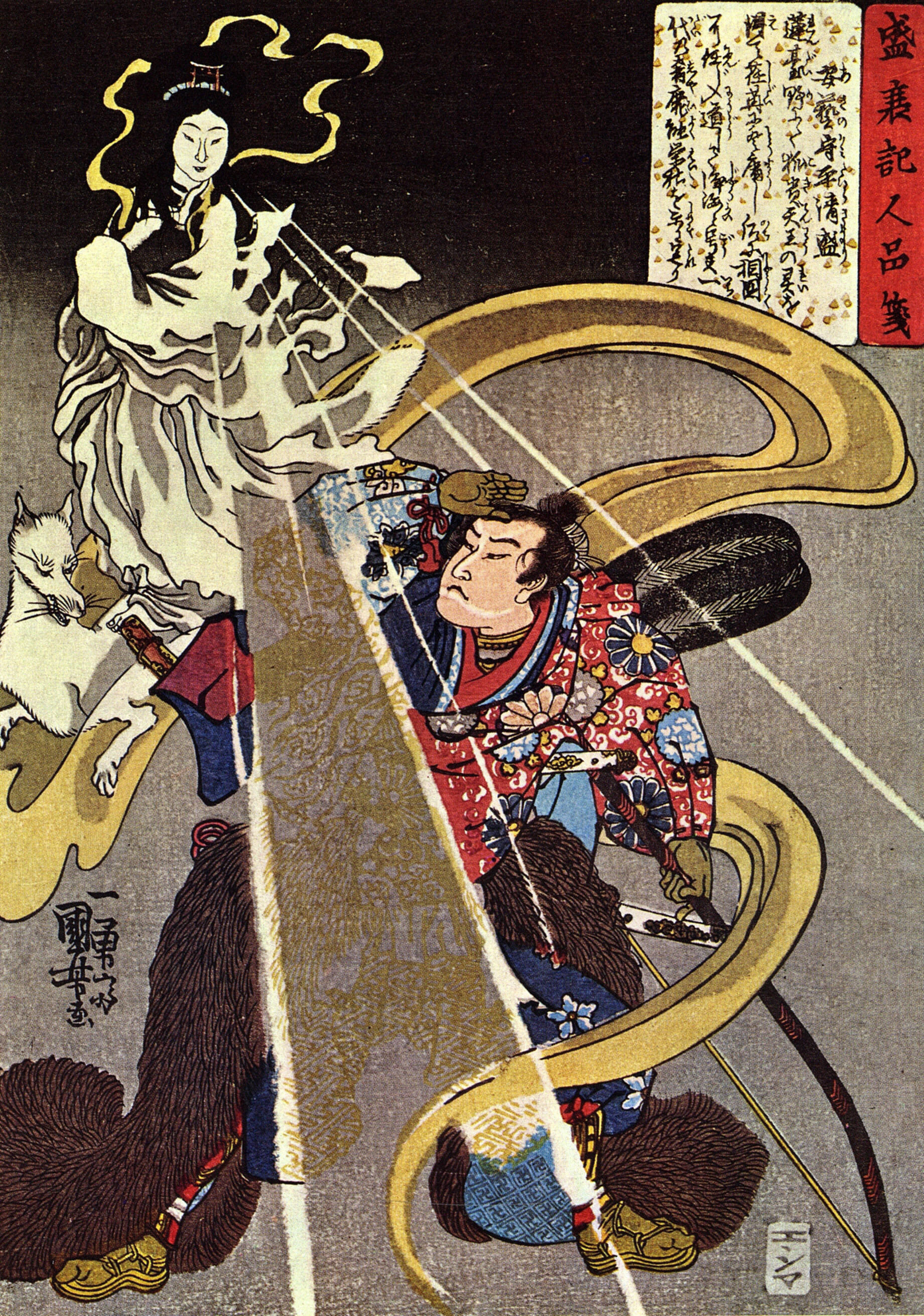
Inari appearing in front of a warrior.

Additional evidence alludes to the foreign origins of the kami Inari, a deity that looks over foxes, fertility, rice, tea and sake, of agriculture and industry, of general prosperity and worldly success.

Fushimi Inari-taisha, the same shrine built by the Hata clan and one of the most influential shrines to officially celebrate the god Inari, stated that the fox deity was most likely not of Japanese origin and had most likely arrived in Japan from the kingdoms of the Korean peninsula. It states that during the Three Kingdoms of Korea period, foxes were widely celebrated as gods and were deified as protectors of agriculture and prosperity due to the influence of Buddhism.

This concept of an agricultural deity was later carried over to the Japanese archipelago by other immigrant clans which arrived in Japan in the earlier centuries and was given the name "稲荷 (いなり)" in kanji which means "carrying rice", (literally "rice load") first found in the Ruijū Kokushi in 892 AD.

Scholars such as Kazuo Higo (肥後 和男) suggest that the Hata clan began the formal worship of Inari as an agriculture kami in the late 5th century as the name "Inari" does not appear in classical Japanese mythology which most likely indicates that the god is foreign.

=== Susanoo-no-Mikoto ===
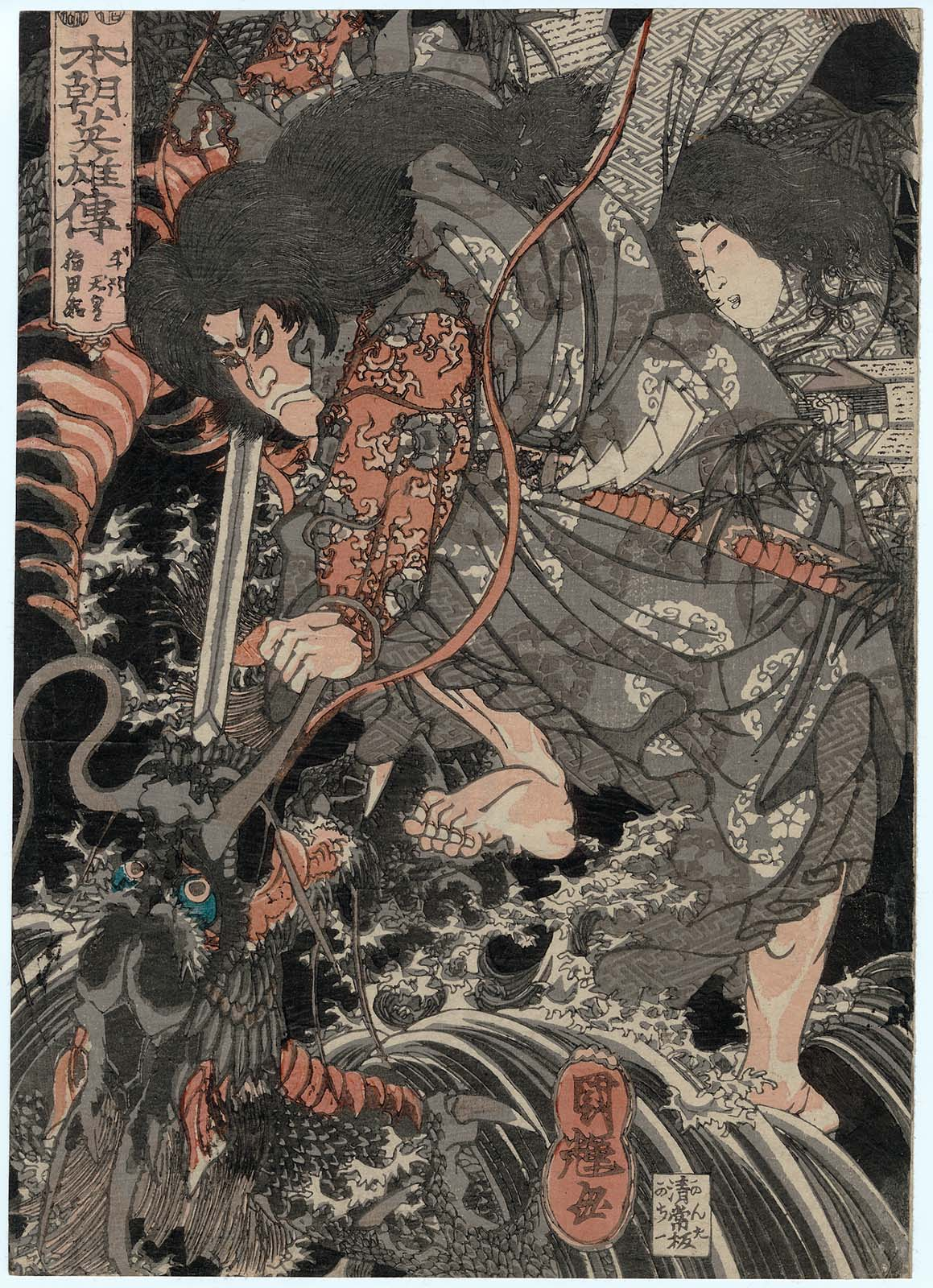
Susanoo kills the Yamata no Orochi. (Utagawa Kuniteru)

There may be some connections to other foreign deities especially with the most commonly mentioned Susanoo-no-Mikoto, brother of kami Amaterasu.

A few myths, such as that of Susanoo's descent in Soshimori in Silla, seem to suggest a connection between the god and the Korean peninsula. Indeed, some scholars have hypothesized that the deities who were eventually conflated with Susanoo, Mutō Tenjin, and Gozu Tennō, may have had Korean origins as well, with the name "Mutō" (武塔, historical orthography: mutau) being linked with the Korean word mudang "shamaness," and "Gozu" being explained as a calque of "Soshimori", here interpreted as being derived from a Korean toponym meaning "Bull's (so) Head (mari)". For further information, see etymology of the title "Uzumasa". The name "Susanoo" itself has been interpreted as being related to the Middle Korean title susung (transliterated as 次次雄 or 慈充), meaning "master" or "shaman", notably applied to Namhae, the second king of Silla, in the Samguk sagi. Susanoo is thus supposed in this view to have originally been a foreign god (蕃神, banshin), perhaps a deified shaman, whose origins may be traced back to Korea.

The theories surrounding Susanoo being introduced to Japan as a foreign god coincide with other kami such as Inari, and may have been introduced in a similar fashion. Their Silla roots (Inari–Hata; Shinra Myōjin–Ōtomo; Susanoo/Gozu Tennō–Soshimori) may indicate that the kami were originally from the peninsula until they were brought over to Japan by Korean immigrants. Ironically, the origins of kami such as Susanoo was retrospectively used as a tool to justify the Japanese annexation of Korea and the assimilation of its people, claiming that Susanoo was a native Japanese god that first arrived and founded Silla, rather than a Silla-originating god that moved to Japan. Elder Shinto priest, Tsunoda Tadayuki postulated that Susanoo was in fact analogous with Tan'gun, a native Korean deity and advocated the amalgamation of the Japanese kami with the Korean god. A similar phenomenon happened prior with Susanoo and Gozu Tennō, another foreign god that may have Korean origin.

=== Others ===
Other kami of speculated foreign origins include:

- Gozu Tennō – A kami that is often amalgamated with the aforementioned Susanoo.
- Ōkuninushi – The son (or descendant) of Susanoo who is also often associated with Korea due to his father.
- Kawa-no-Kami – Also known as "Kahaku (河伯)". May have been influenced by China's Hebo and Korea's Habaek.

== Population estimates ==
The method proposed by Koyama (1978) to calculate the ratio of the number of sites from multiple periods enables population estimates for the Jomon and Yayoi periods, which in turn enables the demographic simulations of Koyama and Sugitoh (1984) and Hanihara (1987) into the prehistoric period of Japan.

The current consensus in regards to Toraijin population estimation is highly debated.

Hanihara argued that more than 3 million (3025 people/year) immigrated to the Japanese archipelago between 300 BCE – 700 CE. In addition, based on estimates from studies of Senzuka (cemeteries of “thousand tombs”) belonging to the Toraijin from the southwestern Korean peninsula and their descendants, Shinichirō Ishiwatari postulated that at least a million people from the peninsula arrived in the archipelago just during the 125 years between 475–600 CE.

However, the hypothesis of a very large number of migrants coming to the Japanese archipelago, as represented by Hanihara and Ishiwatari, was criticized by later simulation studies (Nakahashi and Iizuka 1998, 2008) with Aoki and Tuljapurkar (2000) estimating a smaller number of migrants (around 50 to 100 migrants/year).

Recently, there is a shift from finding population estimates to finding the number of waves that entered Japan, as deducing an exact number across several millennia is deemed less feasible. The waves are identified through genetics, anthropology, and linguistics.

== Genetics ==
The term "Toraijin" usually encompasses the Jōmon period, Yayoi period, Kofun period, and the Asuka period, therefore it is considered too broad to be condensed into a single name or a group genealogically.

For scientific analysis of the Japanese people's ancestry, see Genetic and anthropometric studies on Japanese people.

== See also ==
- Immigration to Japan
- Koreans in Japan
- Nissen dōsoron
