= Seo (surname) =

- Hangul: 서
- Hanja: 徐; 俆; 西; 書; 緖
- RR: Seo
- MR: Sŏ
- IPA: [sʌ]

Seo
- Language: Japanese

Origin
- Language: Japonic
- Meaning: Different meanings depending on the kanji used.

Other names
- Related names: Seno

Seo is a Korean and Japanese surname.

As a Korean surname, Seo is the most frequent romanization, but it may also be romanized as Suh, Surh, Sur, Seoh, So, Su, and Suhr. The surname most commonly represents the hanja 徐. The Chinese surname Xú also uses the same character.

As a Japanese surname, Seo is pronounced in two syllables ([se.o]) and most frequently written as 瀬尾 and is shared by 23,000+ individuals in Japan. Historically, the Seo clan (瀬尾) was also one of the cadet branches of the Hata clan, an immigrant clan from the kingdom of Silla. The second most common Seo is written as 妹尾 and is shared by 21,000+ individuals in Japan. The remaining variants are used by less than 2,000 individuals each and are generally used by related families.

== Korean surname ==
=== Art and entertainment ===
- Seo Jeong-in (1936–2025), South Korean writer

==== Film and television ====
- Seo Bum-june, South Korean actor
- Caroline Suh, Korean–American documentary film director and producer
- Seo Do-young, South Korean actor
- Seo Eun-ah, South Korean actress
- Seo Ha-joon, South Korean actor
- Seo Hye-won, South Korean actress
- Seo Hyo-rim, South Korean actress
- Seo Hyun-chul, South Korean theatre, film, television actor
- Seo Hyun-jin, South Korean actress and singer
- Seo Hyun-woo, South Korean actor
- Seo Ji-hoon, South Korean actor
- Seo Ji-hye, South Korean actress
- Seo Ji-seok, South Korean actor
- Seo Kang-joon, South Korean actor and singer, member of actor group 5urprise
- Seo Min-jung, South Korean actress
- Seo Shin-ae, South Korean actress
- Seo Woo-jin, South Korean child actor and model
- Seo Yea-ji, South Korean actress

==== Music ====
- Seo Dong-hyeon (stage name Samuel Seo), South Korean singer-songwriter, rapper, and record producer
- Seo Dong-hyeon (stage name Big Naughty), South Korean rapper
- Seo Eun-kwang, South Korean singer, member and leader of boy band BtoB
- Seo Hye-lin, South Korean singer and member of girl group EXID
- Seo In-guk, South Korean singer and actor
- Seo In-young, South Korean singer, dancer, model, television host, and actress
- Seo Ji-young, South Korean singer
- Seo Joo-hyun (stage name Seohyun), South Korean singer and actress, member of girl group Girls' Generation
- Seo Jung-kwon (stage name Tiger JK), Korean-American rapper, record producer and entrepreneur
- Seo Min-woo (1985–2018), South Korean singer and actor, member of boy group 100%
- Seo Soo-jin, South Korean singer and dancer, former member of girl group (G)I-DLE
- Seo Yu-na, South Korean singer and actress, member of girl group AOA
- Jeong Hyeon-cheol (stage name Seo Taiji), South Korean singer, musician, songwriter and record producer
- Susie Suh, Korean-American folk-rock singer-songwriter
- Angela Seo (born Hyunhye Seo), experimental musician and member of Xiu Xiu
- Seo Changbin, South Korean singer, producer, songwriter, composer, rapper, dancer, member of boy group Stray Kids

==== Visual arts ====
- Do-ho Suh, South Korean sculptor and installation artist
- Seo Soo-kyoung (known as SEO), South Korean contemporary artist
- Seo Ae-jin (known as Showry), South Korean video blogger
- Suh Yongsun, South Korean painter and sculptor
- Hee Seo, South Korean ballet dancer, principal dancer at the American Ballet Theatre

=== Sports ===
==== Football ====
- Seo Dong-myung, former South Korean football goalkeeper
- Seo Hyuk-su, former Korean-Australian football player
- Seo Jung-won, former South Korean football player and coach
- Ndamukong Suh (born 1987), American football player

==== Other ====
- Jae Weong Seo, retired South Korean baseball player
- Hee-kyung Seo, former South Korean professional golfer
- Seo Ho-jin, former South Korean speed skater and Olympic athlete
- Seo Jang-hoon, former South Korean professional basketball player, entertainer and a variety show star
- Seo Mi-jung, South Korean foil fencer
- Seo Yoon-hee, South Korean badminton player
- Suh Sung-in, South Korean boxer
- Suh Yun-bok (1923–2017), South Korean marathoner
- Seo Bok-seob, South Korean hapkido co-founder
- Seo Seung-jae, South Korean badminton player
- Seo Bong-soo, South Korean professional Go player
- Seo Jae-pil, first naturalized Korean-American
- Anna Wallis Suh (1900–1969), Methodist missionary, American expatriate, North Korean propagandist
- Suh Nam-pyo, thirteenth president of the Korea Advanced Institute of Science and Technology
- Suh Sang-chul, South Korean economist, educator and administrator
- Suh Pann-Ghill, South Korean neuroscientist and third president of the Korea Brain Research Institute
- Seo Sang-ryun, South Korean minister, founder of first Korean Protestant church
- Philip Jaisohn, first Korean to become a U.S. citizen
- Seo Yong-duk, South Korean football midfielder
- Seo Ji-hye, South Korean actress
- Seo Whi-min, South Korean short track speed skater
- Seo Chae-hyun, South Korean Climber
- Seo Hun-tae, South Korean Paralympic shooter
- Seo Eun-su, South Korean taekwondo practitioner

== Japanese surname ==
- Akane Seo (瀬尾 茜, born 1988), Japanese sports coach and retired figure skater
- Akiko Seo (瀬尾 秋子, born 1984), Japanese gravure idol
- Aya Seo (瀬尾 有耶, born 1991), Japanese volleyball player
- Fumiko Seo (瀬尾 芙巳子, born 1929), Japanese academic, doctor, professor and emeritus of Kyoto University
- Hideki Seo (瀬尾 英樹, born 1974), Japanese fashion designer based in Paris, France
- Hirofumi Seo (瀬尾 拡史, born 1985), Japanese doctor and CEO of Sciement Co., Ltd.
- Hiroshi Seo (photographer) (瀬尾 央), Japanese photographer
- Hiroshi Seo (colonel) (瀬尾浩), late Japanese colonel of the 124th Division of the Imperial Japanese Army
- Ichizō Seo (瀬尾 一三, born 1947), Japanese singer-songwriter, music producer and music arranger
- Ikuo Seo (瀬尾 育生, born 1949), Japanese poet
- Kami Seo (瀬尾 佳美), Japanese environmental economist, professor and researcher
- Kaname Seo (瀬尾 要, 1891–1934), Japanese noh performing artist
- Kazuko Seo (瀬尾 和子, born 1971), Japanese television announcer
- Kazunori Seo (瀬尾 和紀, born 1974), Japanese musician
- Kazutoshi Seo (瀬尾 和寿, born 1981), stage name Kazu (カズ), Japanese comedian and member of comedy duo Kazu & Ai
- Keiko Seo (瀬尾 恵子, born 1960), Japanese voice actress
- Kentarō Seo (瀬尾 健太朗, born 1990), Japanese comedian and member of comedy duo THE SHEET
- Kiyoshi Seo (瀬尾 清, born 1970), Japanese soccer player
- Kobako Totan (小箱 とたん), real name Seo Kotoba (瀬尾 ことば), Japanese manga artist
- Kōji Seo (瀬尾 公治, born 1974), Japanese manga artist
- Koruto Seo (瀬尾 こると), Japanese novelist
- Kumekichi Yamamoto (山本 粂吉, née Seo (瀬尾), 1893–1974), Japanese politician and lawyer
- Kumi Seo (瀬尾 久美, born 1983), Japanese actress, model and talent
- Kyōko Seo (瀬尾 京子, born 1972), Japanese sports coach and retired gymnast
- Magozaemon Seo ((瀬尾 孫左衛門), Edo era Japanese samurai
- Maiko Seo (瀬尾 まいこ, born 1974), Japanese novelist
- Masaru Seo (瀬尾 傑, born 1965), Japanese businessman, journalist and news pundit
- Mitsuyo Seo (瀬尾 光世, 1911–2010), Japanese animator, screenwriter and director
- Munetoshi Seo (瀬尾 宗利, born 1967), Japanese composer
- Nanae Seo (瀬尾 七重, born 1942), Japanese children's novelist
- Noritake Seo (瀬尾 乃武, 1899–1997), Japanese noh performing artist and late certified Living National Treasure of Japan
- Reiko Seo (瀬尾 礼子), Japanese actress
- Shōtarō Seo (瀬尾 祥太郎), Japanese music lyricist, composer and arranger
- Taemi Seo (瀬尾 妙実, also known as Kim Myo-shil (김묘실; 金妙実), born 1965), a retired North Korean-Japanese figure skater
- Takahiro Seo (瀬尾 尚弘, born 1971), Japanese kickboxer
- Takeshi Seo (瀬尾 健, 1940–1944), Japanese engineer, academic and professor
- Takumichi Seo (瀬尾 拓慶), Japanese photographer
- Takuya Seo (瀬尾 卓也, born 1984), Japanese actor
- Tatsuya Seo (瀬尾 達也, born 1960), Japanese motorboat racer
- Tomomi Seo (瀬尾 智美), Japanese retired football player
- Tomomi Seo (瀬尾 智美, born 1969), Japanese actress, voice actress and narrator
- Tsukasa Seo (瀬尾 つかさ), Japanese light novelist
- Yasutsugu Seo (瀬尾 育弐), Japanese medical engineer, medical technologist and professor
- Yutaka Seo (瀬尾 裕, 1916–1988), Japanese translator and academic

== Written forms ==
Japanese

- 瀬尾
- 妹尾
- 清尾
- 背尾
- 脊尾
- 瀬音
- 世尾
- 世応
- 勢尾
- 清雄
- 世雄
- 世應
- 世王
- 瀬王
- 瀬生
- 瀨尾

== Fictional characters ==
As a surname (Japan)

- Akira Seo (瀬尾 晶), a character in the Japanese adult visual novel Tsukihime Plus-Disc
- Hiroyuki Seo (瀬尾 弘之), a character in the Japanese film Was I Really Ugly?
- Hitomi Seo (瀬尾 仁美), a character in the Japanese film Memory Investigation ~ Shinjuku East Station Case File
- Kaoru Seo (瀬尾 香), a character in the Japanese manga series Sekirei
- Ken'ichi Seo (瀬尾 謙一), a character in the Japanese TV drama Smiling Angel
- Kenji Seo (瀬尾 健司), a character in the Japanese novel The Tender Lance of Sara
- Mitsuki Seo (瀬尾 みづき), a character in the Japanese video game Jewel BEM Hunter Lime
- Mitsuko Seo (瀬尾 美津子), a character in the Japanese film Was I Really Ugly?
- Narumi Seo (瀬尾 鳴海), a character in the Japanese mobile game Stand My Heroes
- Seo (瀬尾), a character in the Japanese TV drama Smiling Angel
- Seo (瀬尾), a character in the Japanese film The Young General Who Returned
- Shōji Seo (瀬尾彰二), a character in the Japanese animated film Symphony in August - Shibuya 2002～2003
- Naomi Seo (瀬尾 直美), a character in the Japanese adult game Black Fragment: Mystery of Necronomicom
- Ritsuko Seo (瀬尾 リツ子), a character in the Japanese TV drama LOVE STORY IN NEW YORK
- Ryūji Seo (瀬尾 竜二), a character in the Japanese TV drama Love Again
- Sayaka Seo (瀬尾 さやか), a character in the Japanese TV drama LOVE STORY IN NEW YORK
- Shizune Seo (瀬尾 静音), a character in the Japanese animated film The Garden of Sinners: Future Gospel
- Takayuki Seo (瀬尾孝之), a character in the Japanese TV drama I Will Deliver That Edge - The Story of Mercari -
- Tomoya Seo (瀬尾 智也), a character in the Japanese manga Assassination Classroom
- Tosuke Seo (瀬尾 斗介), a character in Japanese historical TV drama The Scream
- Yasumasa Seo (瀬尾 泰正), a character in the Japanese TV drama The Sun Rises Again
- Yūdai Seo (瀬尾 雄大), a character in the Japanese TV drama A3
- Yukako Seo (瀬尾 由加子), a character in the Japanese stage play KINSHU
- Yūzō Seo (瀬尾 雄三), a character in the Japanese multimedia series Green Horizon
- Yuzuki Seo (瀬尾 結月), a character in the Japanese manga Monthly Girls' Nozaki-kun

As a surname (South Korea)

- Chairman Seo Byung-ki (서병기), a character in the South Korean TV drama Tracer
- Seo Do-cheol (서도철), the main character of the South Korean movie Veteran and its sequel Veteran 2
- Seo Hye-young (서혜영), one of the main characters of the South Korean TV drama Tracer
- Seo In-ho (서인호), a character in the South Korean TV drama Doctor Cha
- Seo Jang-yeob (서장엽), character in the South Korean TV drama Korean Peninsula
- Seo Ji-seok (서지석), a character in the South Korean TV drama Angel's Revenge
- Seo Jung-hoo (서정후), the main character of the South Korean TV drama Healer
- Seo Jung-min (서정민), a character in the South Korean TV drama Doctor Cha
- Seo Jung-woo (서정우), one of the main characters of the South Korean TV drama My Girl
- Seo Kang-hoon (서강훈), a character in the South Korean TV drama DNA Lover
- Seo Min-ki (서민기), the main character of the South Korean movie Happy End
- Seo Myung-joon (서명준), the main character of the South Korean TV drama Korean Peninsula
- Seo Yi-rang (서이랑), a character in the South Korean TV drama Doctor Cha
- Seo Yoo-ra (서유라), the main antagonist of the South Korean TV drama Gold Mask
- Seo Ryang (서량), the main protagonist of the South Korean light novel and manhwa Chronicles of the Demon Faction
- Seo Dawon (서다원), the male lead of the webnovel and manhwa Necromancer Survival.

== See also ==
- List of Korean surnames
- Xú
- Seno (disambiguation)
