= Hata clan =

Ancient Japanese clan

Hata 秦
- The Kagome mon, the supposed heraldic symbol of the clan.
- Home province: Silla, Uljin, Padan (波旦); Paekche/Kaya confederacy (according to the Nihon Shoki; disputed); Qin dynasty (according to the Shinsen Shōjiroku; disputed); Israel (according to Nichiyu dōsoron; disputed)
- Parent house: Hata clan (波多氏); Paekche or Kaya royalty (according to the Nihon Shoki; disputed); Qin? (秦?) a misinterpretation of Yíng or Zhao (according to the Shinsen Shōjiroku; disputed); Hebrew Patriarchs (according to Nichiyu dōsoron; disputed)
- Titles: Various
- Founder: Yuzuki no Kimi (disputed)
- Founding year: 1st–2nd century?; 5th century (most likely)
- Dissolution: 9th century? (succeeded or absorbed by the Koremune clan in 880)
- Cadet branches: Chōsokabe clan (disputed); Kawakatsu clan; Koremune clan; Jinbō clan; etc

Hata clan (秦氏, Hata-shi) was an immigrant clan from Korea that was active in Japan since the Kofun period, according to the history of Japan laid out in the Nihon Shoki (720).

The clan members were later given official titles ranging from "Uzumasa (禹豆満佐/太秦)", "Hata no Sukune (秦宿禰)", "Hata no Imiki (秦忌寸)", "Hata no Sakeno Kimi (秦酒公)", "Hata no Kimi (秦公)", and "Toroshikō (登呂志公)" after being recognized as a legitimate clan of Japan after naturalization.

== Origin ==
The root of the clan has been a debated topic for many Japanese historians and scholars.

Many have suggested different origins throughout history starting from traditional accounts such as Paekche, Qin dynasty, Kaya confederacy, and more contemporary accounts such as Israel to Silla.

=== Popular theories ===
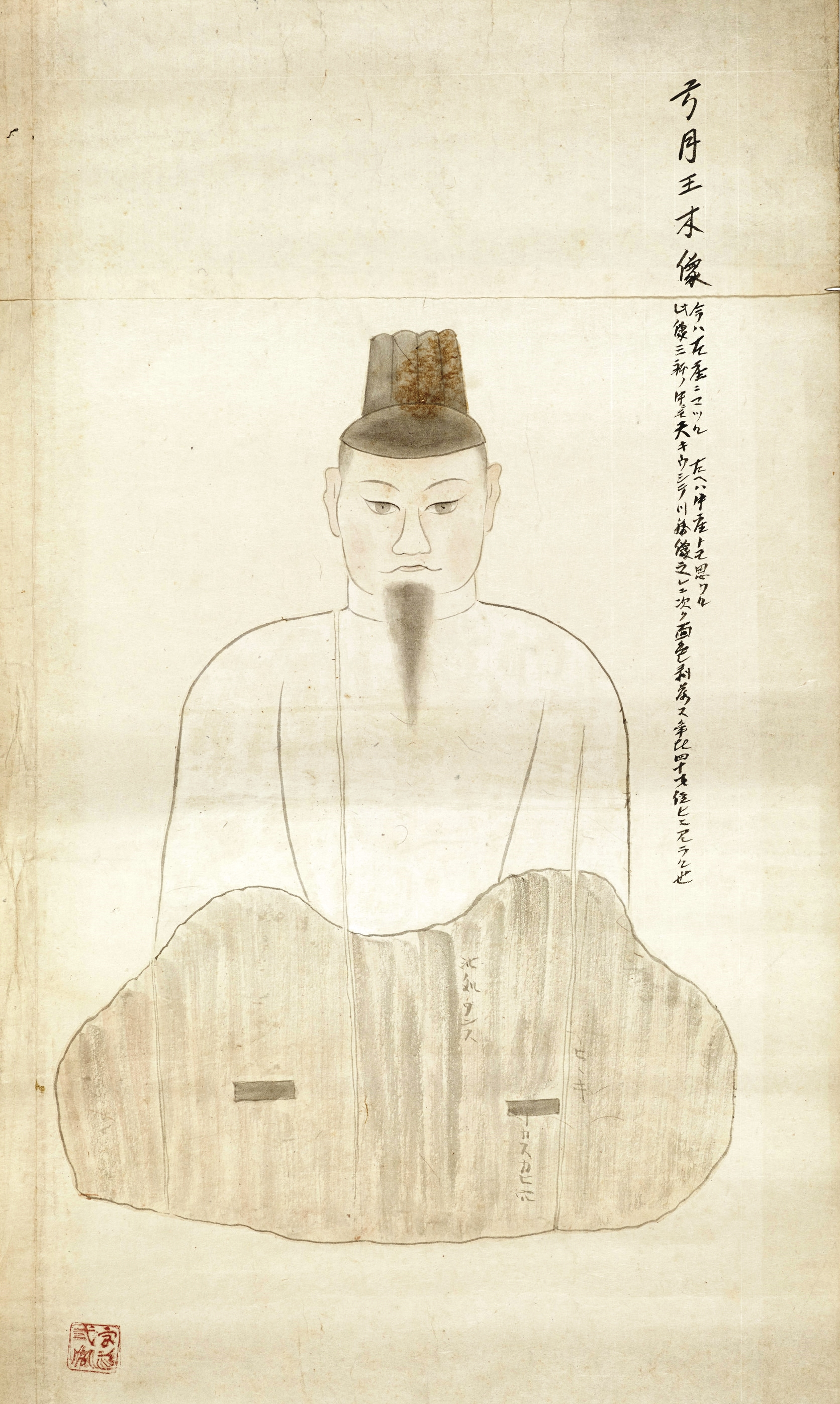
Yuzuki no Kimi, the founder of the Hata clan from Paekche. (Ninagawa Noritane, 1857)

==== Paekche ====
The first mention of Hata clan (or what is believed to be the Hata clan) was in the Nihon Shoki, describing an immigrant clan (known as Toraikei (渡来系) in Japanese, literally "lineage coming from abroad") arriving in Japan led by Yuzuki no Kimi from Paekche.

According to the Nihon Shoki, during the reign of Emperor Ōjin, Yuzuki no Kimi visited Japan from the Kingdom of Paekche where he stated that he had long wanted to emigrate to Japan, but the Kingdom of Silla would not permit him to do so. He left Japan but returned in 283, with additional members of his clan "from 120 districts of his own land". In actuality, neither Yuzuki no Kimi nor his clan members are mentioned as the founders of the Hata clan in the Nihon Shoki as the specific name, "Hata (秦)" does not appear in the book, only mentioning Yuzuki no Kimi and his "clan members". The claim was made after the publication of the Shinsen Shōjiroku (815) a millennia later, and was inferred based on context.

Some point to the name of Yuzuki no Kimi being of Korean origin. According to Japanese linguists, "弓月君" could be a direct translation of "Kudara (くだら)" a unique name for Paekche in Japanese. In Old Korean, "弓月" could be read as "Kungdar (궁달)" using the Idu system, which is thought to have carried over to the Japanese language as being of Paekche descent as both words share the same pronunciation.

==== Qin dynasty ====
Contrary to the accounts made in the Nihon Shoki, the Shinsen Shōjiroku (815) claims that Yuzuki no Kimi, was allegedly a descendant of Qin Shi Huang, the first emperor of the Qin dynasty. Thus the reason behind Hata being written with the character "Qin (秦)". It was also the first time Yuzuki no Kimi's clan introduced in the Nihon Shoki was written under a specific name.

==== Kaya confederacy ====
As mentioned in the Nihon Shoki, Yuzuki no Kimi claimed he had 120 people in Mimana, a place name that points to the Kaya confederacy in Korea. Therefore, it has been theorized that the Hata clan had immigrated from Kaya rather than Paekche.

==== Israel ====
Some 19th and 20th century pseudohistorians claimed that the Hata clan descended from a Jewish tribe that is often associated with the Ten Lost Tribes of ancient Israel (Samaria). While admitting that the clan's immigration route was ultimately from Korea to Japan, proponents of this theory believed that the clan members were in fact descendants of said Jewish tribesmen; claiming that they originated from Israel which travelled to Central Asia, then to mainland China, then to the Korean peninsula where they ultimately immigrated to Japan as their final destination. For further information, see Jewish ancestry theory.

==== Silla ====
Though not directly stated in either the Nihon Shoki or Shinsen Shōjiroku, modern Japanese scholars theorize Silla was the place of origin of the Hata clan.

=== Modern analysis ===
After numerous archaeological excavations, extensive investigations, and historical research throughout the decades, Japanese historians have long-established that the Hata clan originated from Silla and not any of the previously mentioned kingdoms.

The city of Kyoto and Fushimi Inari-taisha (the shrine that was built by the clan and officially commemorates it) have publicly stated that "despite the ancient records being unreliable, it can be deduced that the Hata clan originates from the kingdom of Silla." (Note: 『以上の来歴は、実際にはあまりあてにならず、近年では、秦氏は朝鮮半島の新羅地方出身であろうと考えられています。』 "The historical accounts are not very reliable, therefore in recent years, the Hata clan is believed to have come from Silla of Korea." — Fushimi Inari-taisha 『古代に朝鮮半島から渡来した氏族。《日本書紀》応神天皇条に，秦始皇帝(しんのしこうてい)子孫という伝承をもつ弓月君（ゆづきのきみ）が多数の民を率いて渡来したのに始まるとしますが，「はた」は古代朝鮮語で海の意であり，実際は5世紀中頃に新羅から渡来した氏族集団と考えられます。』 "[The Hata clan is] a clan that migrated from the Korean Peninsula in ancient times. The section on Emperor Ōjin in the Nihon Shoki states that the clan began when Yuzuki no Kimi, who is said to be a descendant of Emperor Qin Shi Huang, led a large group of people to Japan. However, "hata" means "ocean" in ancient Korean, and it is believed that the clan actually migrated from Silla in the mid-5th century." — History of the City: Hata clan, City of Kyoto) The official Hata clan Historical Heritage Preservation Council (秦歴史遺産保存協議会) also came to the conclusion that Silla was indeed the place of origin after unearthing the clan's ruins throughout the council's longstanding archaeological excavations. (Note: 『秦氏の研究で発掘された遺跡には新羅系の物が多く、日本書紀が新羅を百済と間違えたとするのが定説である。』 "Many of the ruins unearthed through the research of the Hata clan are of Silla origin, and the prevailing theory is that the Nihon Shoki (Chronicles of Japan) mistakenly identified Silla as Paekche." — Hata clan Historical Heritage Preservation Council)

The sentiment is also carried by researchers and historians worldwide with many re-evaluating the claims found in historical documents with modern day evidence.

==== Historical inaccuracy ====
The first inaccuracy is shown within the clan's founder, Yuzuki no Kimi's background, a Paekche individual who arrived in Japan during Emperor Ōjin's reign. Contrary to popular belief, prior to the clan's descendants claiming Yuzuki no Kimi as their ancestor as well as claiming he was of Emperor Qin's descent in the Shinsen Shōjiroku, Yuzuki no Kimi is not mentioned anywhere in his original source, the Nihon Shoki, in regards to him being the actual founder of the Hata clan. In actuality, neither he or his supposed clan who immigrated to Japan are mentioned ever again after their stories found in the Nihon Shoki. Like with most claims found in the Shinsen Shōjiroku, it is most likely that the descendants nominated Yuzuki no Kimi as their founder due to him not having any genealogical affiliations with any clans and declared him as their own. Based on archaeological and linguistical evidence, the clan does not incorporate any Paekche or Qin dynasty elements. (Note: Historically, the Hata clan and Yuzuki no Kimi most likely had no relations at all as no sources allude to them being related outside of the Shinsen Shōjiroku. This is also applied to the Hata clan and Emperor Qin which is also only found in the Shinsen Shōjiroku. Therefore, the relationship between Yuzuki no Kimi and Emperor Qin is also questionable.) In fact, according to historian Hiroshi Kurita (栗田 寛), it was common for Korean descendants to rely on more prominent families for their lineage to raise their social status. (Note: 『社会的地位を引き上げるために、往々にして朝鮮系が名族に世系を仮託することはよくみられる現象である。』 "It is a common phenomenon for people of Korean descent to rely on noble families for their lineage in order to raise their social status." — 栗田 寛)

Another inconsistency rises from the use of the character "Hata (秦)" as the character is not written in the Nihon Shoki and is found only in the Shinsen Shōjiroku when first mentioning Emperor Qin of China. Today, the clan believes that their character "秦" derived from Qin Shi Huang's family name of the same character. However, Japanese scholars pointed out that the name "Qin Shi Huang" was not the emperor's actual name, but was in fact "Yíng Zheng (嬴政)" using the ancestral name of the Yíng family. Historically, "Qin Shi Huang (秦始皇)" literally meant "First Emperor of Qin" which was used as a title rather than a name. The same is applied to the emperor's alternate name, "Shi Huangdi (始皇帝)" which was also a title literally meaning "First Emperor" or "Starting Emperor" alluding to him being the first Emperor in the history of China. Historians believe that the clan misinterpreted "Qin" as the surname of the emperor when in fact, it was originally the name of the state. (Note: Other inconsistency includes the ignorance of the naming system in ancient China. During Qin Shi Huang or Yíng Zheng's period, male individuals used their clan names (氏, shi) instead of their ancestral surnames (姓, xing) which was reserved more for females. Therefore, in actuality, Qin Shi Huang or Yíng Zheng's legal name would have been "Zhao Zheng (趙政)" under the Zhao clan (趙氏, Zhao-shi). If the Hata were truly using Qin Shi Huang's family name or clan name as its surname, it should most likely be Zhao (趙) or at least Yíng (嬴), and not Qin (秦). See names of Qin Shi Huang. There is a Chinese surname called Qin, however, it is a relatively modern name that has little historical connections with the Hata clan except for claiming the same character for similar reasons (memorializing Qin Shi Huang).) In addition, the Hata clan had a previous name which was written under "Hata (波多)" (allegedly since the 2nd century) before adopting "Qin (秦)" in the 9th century, further discrediting the "Qin–Hata origin" theory.

There are other examples where the name "Hata" was used before the clan adopted the new character. Takenouchi no Sukune, a legendary Japanese general who had many connections to Silla, had a son named Hata no Yashiro who is also a legendary figure of the Hata clan while it was still under "波多". Historically, he is believed to be the original founder of the clan despite skepticism from modern scholars (see chronology of the Hata clan). Later, the use of "波多" was also carried on by another immigrant clan of Korean descent called Sakanoue clan, the branch clan of Yamato no Aya clan, where Sakanoue no Ara (坂上阿良) formed his own separate clan using the same characters of Hata clan's original name, "波多". See legacy of the Sakanoue clan for more information.

It is thought that the misconception revolving around the origins of Jinhan (previous kingdom of Silla) being built by Qin dynasty refugees, first mentioned in the Records of the Three Kingdoms, was what caused the Silla immigrants to become descendants of the Qin dynasty in the Shinsen Shōjiroku (see History of Jinhan confederacy). The book is also scrutinized by modern Japanese historians for putting some clans under "Kan (漢)" or "Han dynasty" and not the Three Kingdoms of Korea, the same way it put Hata under Qin dynasty instead of Silla. It also contradicts the claims made in the Nihon Shoki (the first and oldest mentioning of Hata) that Yuzuki no Kimi was from Qin dynasty and not Paekche without providing any substantial evidence. For further context, the Nihon Shoki lacks any mentions of Qin when discussing about Hata.

Historian Mitsuo Inoue (井上 満郎) posits that centuries after immigrants from Silla had settled in the 5th century, their descendants needed a name for their clan founder to be properly included into the Shinsen Shōjiroku, and thus chose Yuzuki no Kimi; someone who was mentioned only once in the Nihon Shoki and had no direct relations with the clan prior to the claim. Afterwards, under the misguided assumption that Silla (Jinhan) was of Qin's origin, it was recorded that Yuzuki no Kimi and in turn, the Hata clan were originally from the Qin dynasty and adopted the "Qin (秦)" character. In return, it is thought that the descendants of the Hata clan sought for social influence during the compilation of Shinsen Shōjiroku, and thus embraced the misinformed idea and self-proclaimed themselves to be part of Qin Shi Huang's lineage which would have given the clan more legitimacy for its political dominance and reason to remain in power. In actuality, their relations to Yuzuki no Kimi is questionable, as well as Yuzuki's own relations with Qin Shi Huang. It is highly likely that all three candidates (Hata–Yuzuki–Qin Shi Huang) are not related as the statements found in the Shinsen Shōjiroku are based on self-proclaimed claims rather than historical and genealogical facts.

Historians such as Kenkichi Katō (加藤 謙吉) and Akira Seki (関 晃) state that the Hata clan's founding story was created by the descendants to compete with the rival Yamato no Aya clan; a powerful Aya clan that claimed descent from Achi no Omi of Paekche, the rival kingdom of the Hata clan's kingdom, Silla. According to historian Masaaki Ueda (上田 正昭), it is recorded that a notable member of the Hata clan, Hata no Kawakatsu, was a practitioner of the Silla-style Buddhism (新羅仏教), a strike contrast to the Paekche-style Buddhism (百済仏教) practiced by the Aya clans and the Soga clan. However, this sentiment is believed to have eroded away over the coming centuries where both of the clans' descendants shared the title of "Imiki (忌寸)" and incorporated each other's ancestor names such as the aforementioned "Hata clan" of the Sakanoue clan (see legacy of the Sakanoue clan).

Further research points to a specific area in Silla known as "Padan (波旦, 파단)" read as "Hatan (はたん)" in Japanese, located in Uljin County as the origin of the Hata clan. According to a research published by Ritsumeikan University, the clan was indeed from Padan (Note: 『秦氏のルーツについては諸説見えるが、新羅の波旦（はたん）から渡来したという有力な見解がある。』 "Although there are many theories surrounding the origins of the Hata clan, it is most likely that the clan originated from Hatan of Silla." — 本郷 真紹, 松尾大社と秦氏) and their descendants settled in the Sagano (嵯峨野, さがの) area (present day Kyoto). Though the area does not exist today, it is mentioned in the Uljin Silla Stele, a stele that was erected during the Silla period. Padan is considered the most likely candidate of Hata clan's origin due to its similar pronunciation (Hatan–Hata) in Japanese while also sharing a character "波 (Ha)" within their respective names (in Hata clan's original name, 波多). In addition, the word "Padan, 波旦" meant "ocean" in the Goguryeo language, a language that is considered Koreanic (same with the Silla language), which further supports the "Hata–Hatan–Ocean–Silla origin" theory.

Realistically, the Hata clan is thought to have arrived in Japan from Silla in the second half of the 5th century, contrary to the statements found in historical texts that claim 1st–2nd century. (Note: "There seems to be scholarly consensus that the Hata clan of well-to-do immigrants arrived in Japan—probably first in the Chikuzen region of Kyushu—by the second half of the fifth century from Silla, Korea." — George A. Keyworth)

==== Archaeological evidence ====
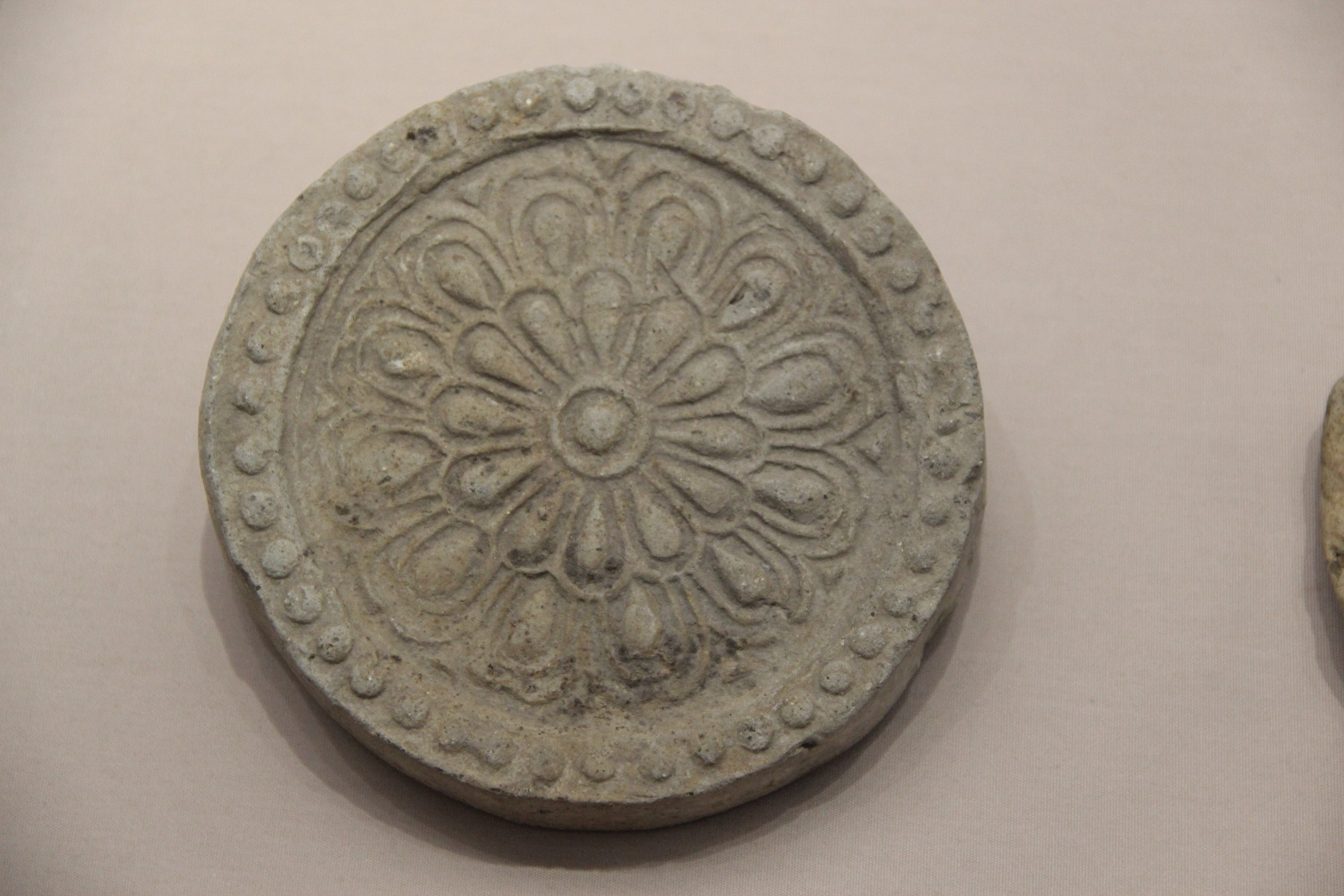
Roof tiles of Silla-style (above) were found in the Hata clan's residential areas.

Finally, excavations in the Hata clan's whereabouts also point to a Silla origin. Recently excavated roof tiles of structures from areas where the Hata clan mainly resided show very strong Silla influence and style. (Note: 『秦氏が多く住んでいたとされる地域から発掘された瓦は新羅系のものが圧倒的に多い。』 "The majority of roof tiles excavated from areas where the Hata clan is believed to have lived are of the Silla type." — The Nikkei, 古代日本の知恵袋、渡来氏族「秦氏」の摩訶不思議) In contrast, archaeological evidence of previously assumed Paekche, Qin or Israeli origin was not discovered.

It is also reinforced by the fact that the Miroku Bosatsu statue, Hōkan Miroku (宝冠弥勒) enshrined within Kōryū-ji, a temple built by the Hata clan was made of woods from Silla (a Korean variant of Pinus densiflora found in present day South Gyeongsang Province) and was gifted to Japan from Silla in 623 according to the Nihon Shoki. The statue heavily resembles the "Gilt-bronze Maitreya in Meditation" of Silla with its signature "Thinking Maitreya" pose and is considered as a sister statue with the original Silla sculpture.

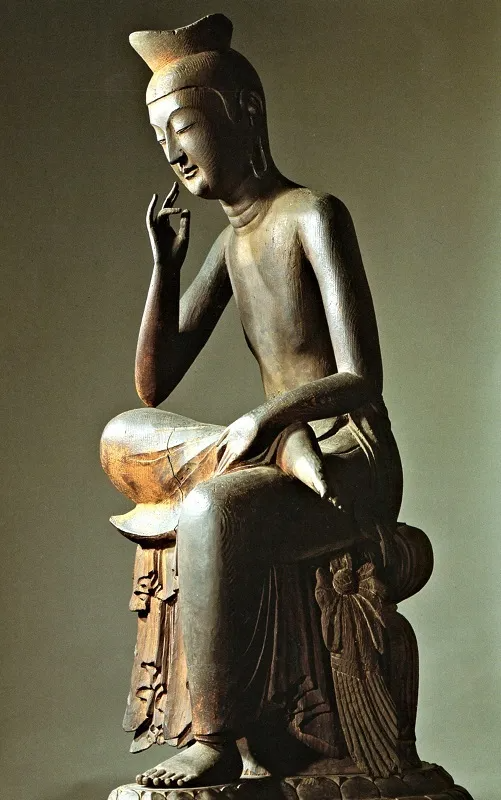
Hōkan Miroku (Hata clan)

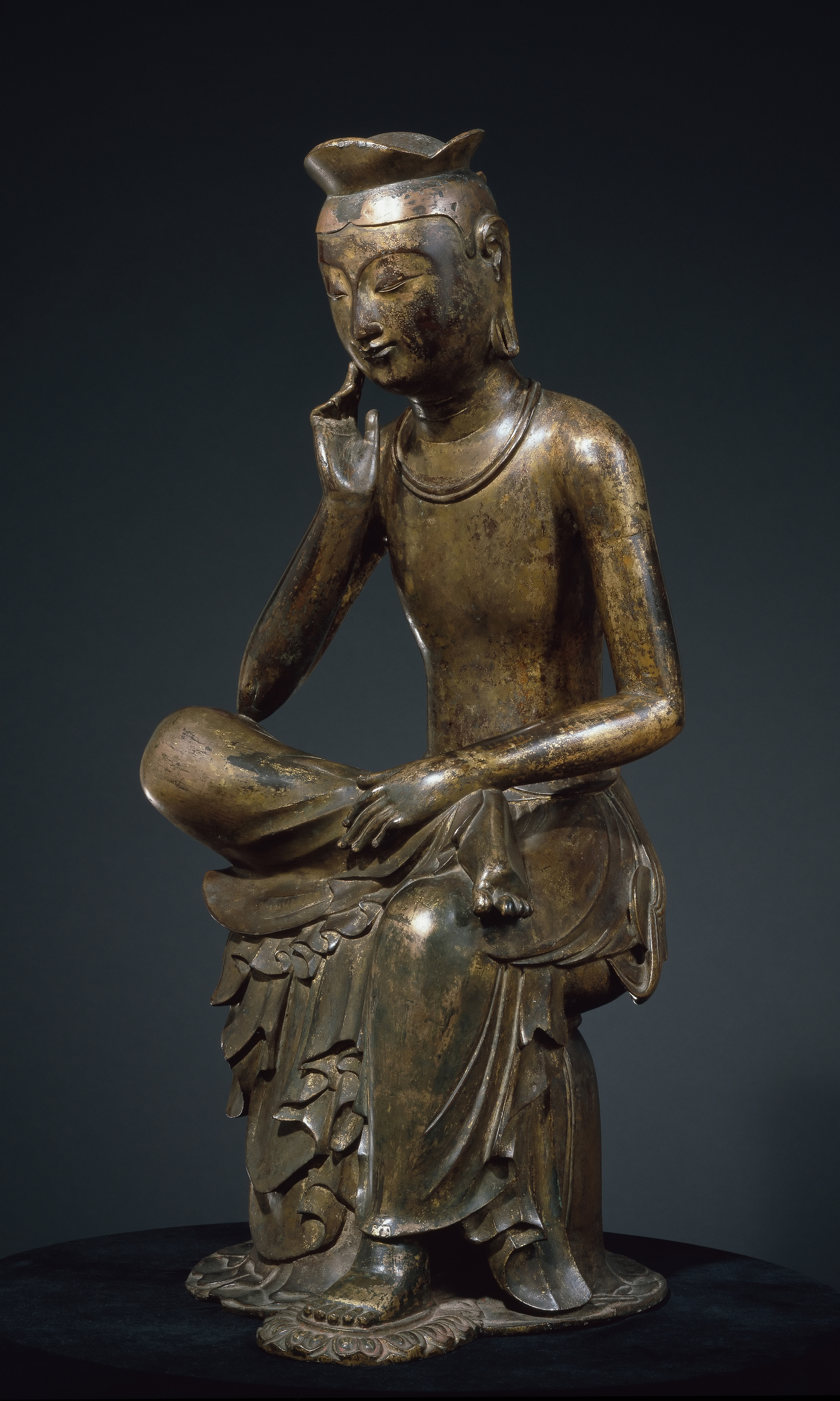
Maitreya in Meditation (Silla) No. 83

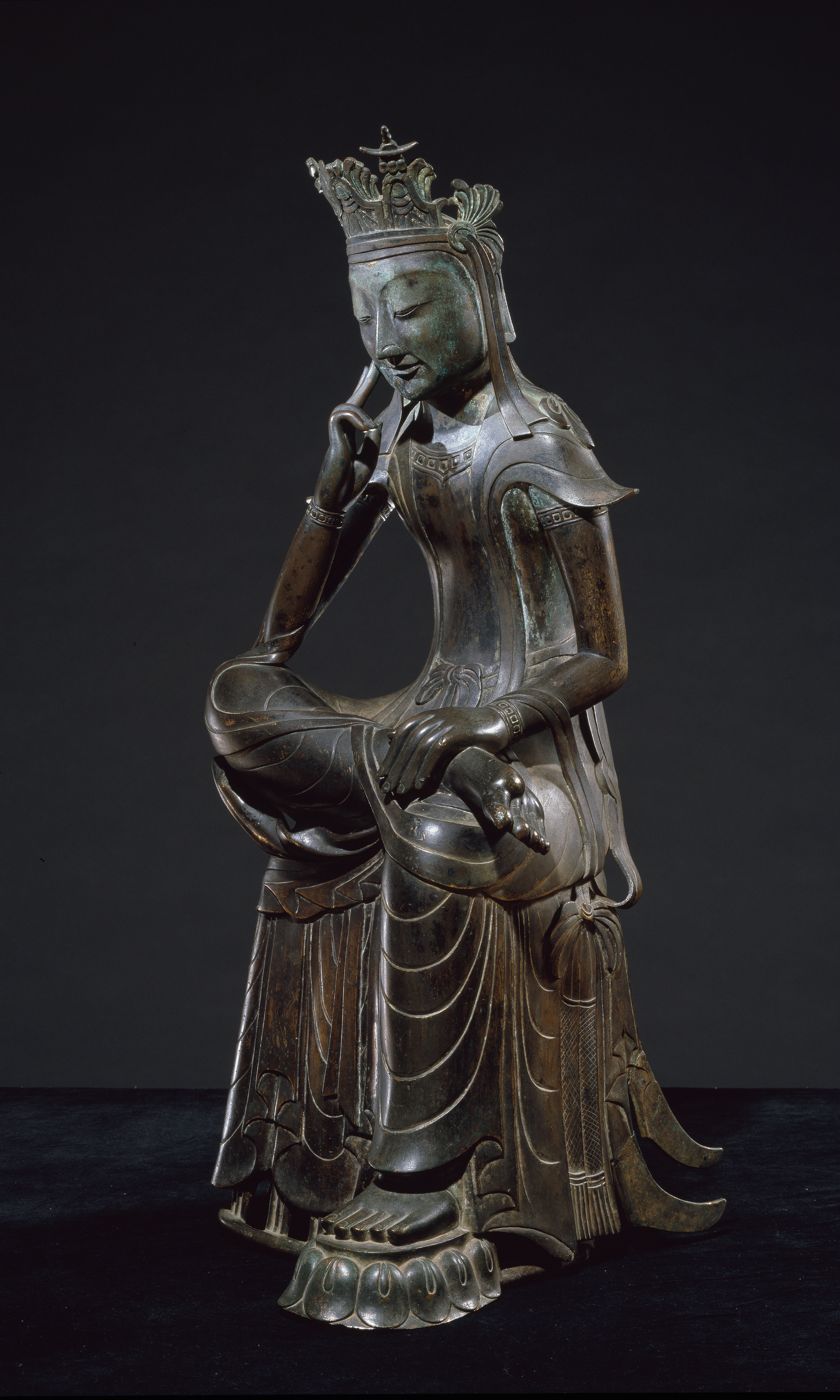
Maitreya in Meditation (Silla) No. 78

Japanese art historian Shuya Ōnishi (大西 修也) specializing in Buddhist art stated in his research that the reason behind the Hata clan possessing a Silla originating statue in their Kōryū-ji temple was due to Silla giving the statue as a gift to its Japanese diaspora. He stated that "despite paucity of further documentary evidence, continuing research on the Silla hanka images in Korea has created a scholarly consensus that the image transmitted [from Silla to Kōryū-ji] in Suiko 31 [616] would have been Kōryū-ji's Crowned Maitreya, i.e., a Silla gift to a Silla-clan temple, the Hata."

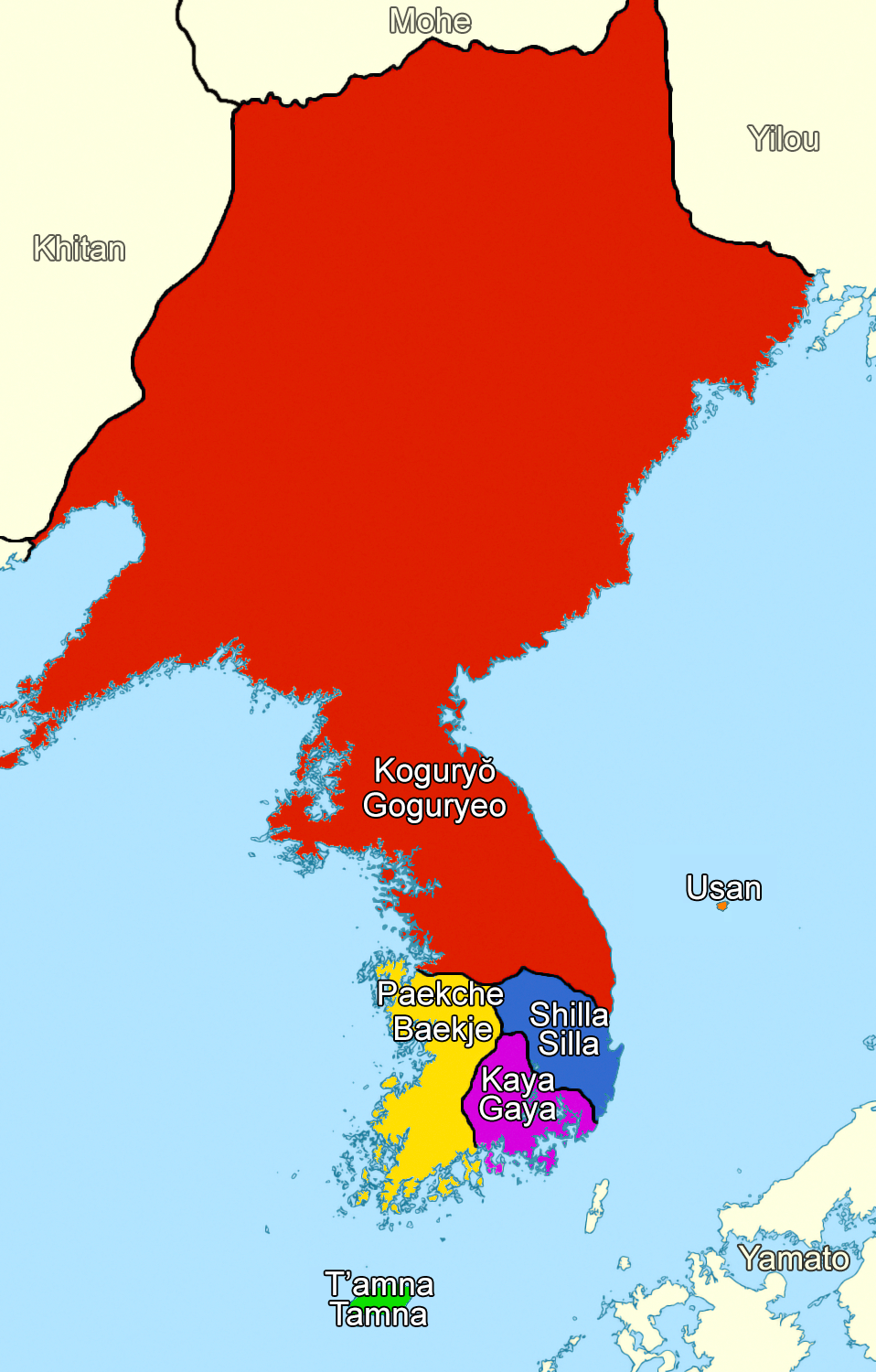
Korea in 476. It is around this time the immigrants from Silla, who would later be known as the Hata clan, would arrive in Japan in Chikuzen (Kyushu) and later expand into Sagano (Honshu).

This could be possible evidence for the theory on the clan arriving in the late 5th century rather than the traditional 1st or 2nd. If late 5th century is to be assumed, the temporal discrepancy between the founding of the clan and the gifting of the statue (early 7th century) would be around 100 years, which is more consistent than the supposed 600–700 years time gap when 1st or 2nd century is considered, making the gifting rather abrupt and random. (Note: In contrast, Silla during the early 7th century, the time around the gifting of the sculpture to the Hata clan, was considered as the pinnacle of cultural and religious enlightenment under King Jinpyeong's reign (see Buddhism in Silla). It was during this period when Buddhism was fully embraced by the kingdom and much effort was put in to promote the religion to other places. It can be speculated that it was due to this reason why the valued statue was given to the Hata clan as it would have been a way to promote the religion to Japan through its local diaspora while simultaneously strengthening its ties with them.)

In addition, Ōnishi also posited that Silla and the Hata clan were on good terms even though the Yamato kingship's relationship with the kingdom was starting to wane, especially after the Silla–Goguryeo and Paekche–Kaya–Wa War, hinting at a possibility of Silla giving the Hata clan special treatment for being their kin evident in the gifting of the Maitreya statue and providing new technology to the clan that was not yet introduced to Japan at the time for antecedental leverage. (Note: Similar treatment was given by other Korean kingdoms to their immigrant clans such as Paekche to the Yamato no Aya clan, and Goguryeo to their Koma clan. This practice continued even until the Muromachi period to the Sengoku period where the Joseon dynasty provided the Ōuchi clan special treatment for being of Korean descent (specifically of Paekche).) This lasted until the 7th century when the Battle of Baekgang occurred and Silla's relationship with Yamato soured to the point of no returning, both cutting their diplomatic ties that lasted until the fall of Unified Silla and the rise of Goryeo dynasty in the 10th century. (Note: The Goryeo dynasty claimed successorship of late Goguryeo and not Silla. This sentiment allowed Yamato (Japan) to begin forming ties with Korea again.) Prior to this, it is believed that all traces of Silla elements were erased or modified within Japanese records while also vilifying Silla in many of the new stories added later. (Note: All of the stories antagonizing Silla are found in texts published after their fallout in the 7th century: The story in regards to Yuzuki no Kimi revolves around he and his people's detainment committed by Silla. A story found within Takenouchi no Sukune's biography also depicts Silla as an aggressive kingdom where Takenouchi no Sukune himself was sent to declare war on the kingdom. Empress Jingū is said to have received a heavenly order to invade Silla and reclaim it as a rightful land of Japan (Yamato). Her alleged ancestor Amenohiboko, a Silla prince, is also depicted as a hot-headed misogynist who lost his first wife due to a trivial outburst. In the legend of Susanoo-no-Mikoto, the kami first arrives in Silla after exiting the heavens, but leaves soon after for being "displeased" about the place.) This ultimately affected the Hata clan too as it most likely lost relations with its once-amicable home kingdom, and its members and their descendants likely lost touch with their Silla roots over the coming centuries.

==== Connections to Inari and other kamis ====
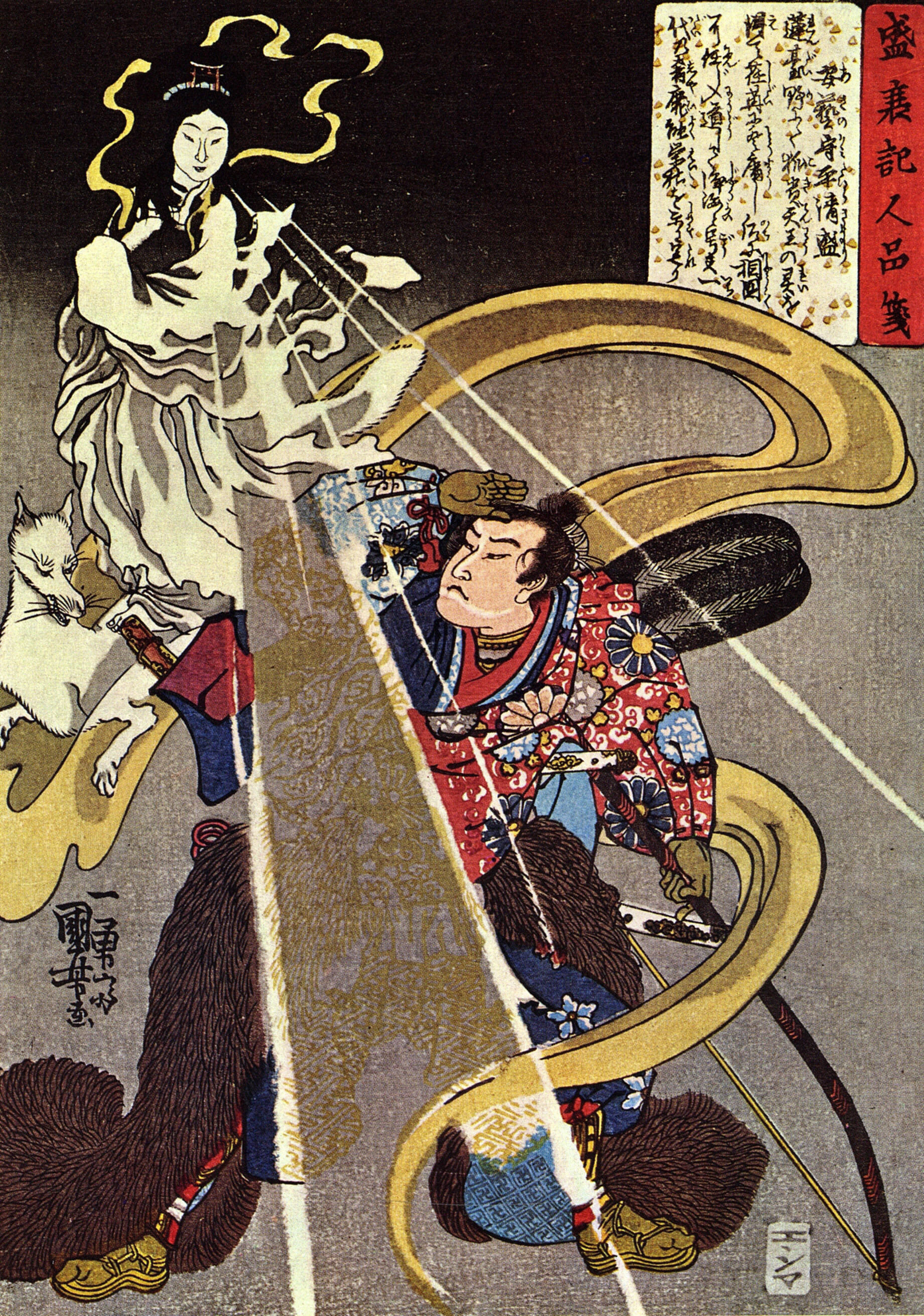
Kami Inari appearing in front of a warrior.

Additional evidence alludes to the foreign origins of the kami Inari, a deity that looks over foxes, fertility, rice, tea and sake, of agriculture and industry, of general prosperity and worldly success.

Fushimi Inari-taisha, the same shrine built by the Hata clan and one of the most influential shrines to officially celebrate the god Inari, stated that the fox deity was most likely not of Japanese origin and had most likely arrived in Japan from the kingdoms of the Korean peninsula. It states that during the Three Kingdoms of Korea period, foxes were widely celebrated as gods and were deified as protectors of agriculture and prosperity due to the influence of Buddhism.

This concept of an agricultural deity was later carried over to the Japanese archipelago by other immigrant clans which arrived in Japan in the earlier centuries and was given the name "稲荷 (いなり)" in kanji which means "carrying rice", (literally "rice load") first found in the Ruijū Kokushi in 892 AD.

Scholars such as Kazuo Higo (肥後 和男) suggest that the Hata clan began the formal worship of Inari as an agriculture kami in the late 5th century as the name "Inari" does not appear in classical Japanese mythology which most likely indicates that the god is foreign. Higo's theory on the introduction of the kami by the Hata clan also aligns closely with the hypothesis of the clan arriving in Japan in the late 5th century.

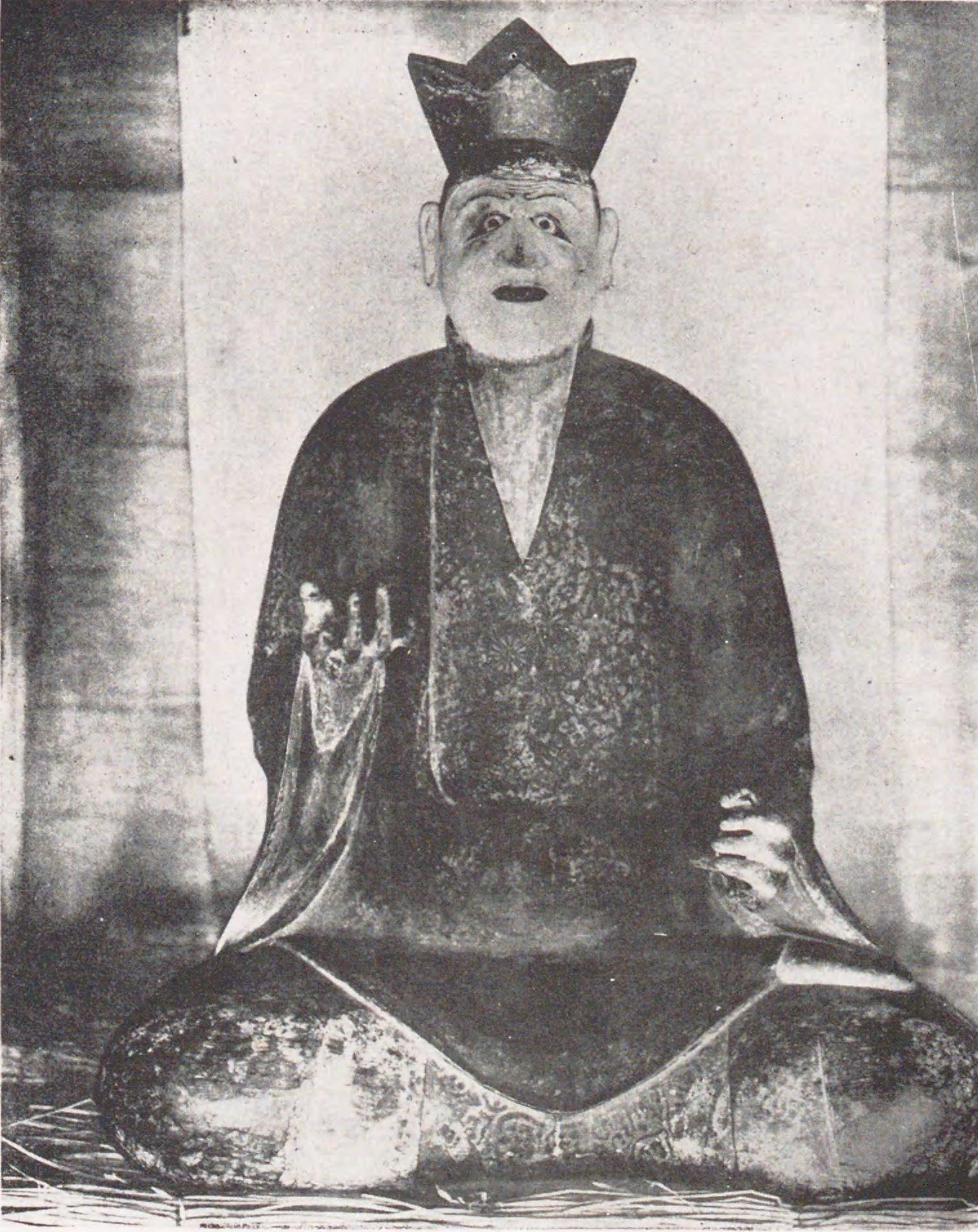
A statue of Shinra Myōjin, the kami from Silla.

It is said that the history of the Ōtomo clan, another clan from Silla, was heavily intertwined with Shinra Myōjin (lit. 'Shining deity of Silla'), a Buddhist god associated with the Jimon branch of Tendai, a school of Japanese Buddhism. His name is derived from the name of a historical Korean kingdom, Silla.

Professor Sujung Kim (김수정) at DePauw University of religious studies who specializes in history of Buddhism in East Asia, claims that the Ōtomo clan's special ties to deities such as the Shinra Myōjin may provide an insight to the clan's possible origins.

It is said that the Ōtomo clan was one of the earliest clans to commemorate Shinra Myōjin and was involved in promoting the veneration of said deity. Kim posited that the Shinra Myōjin originally being a Silla god sheds light on the possibility of the clan being Silla immigrants as it was common for immigrants from specific regions to be left with commemorating gods from the same origins as seen with the Hata clan and the kami Inari.

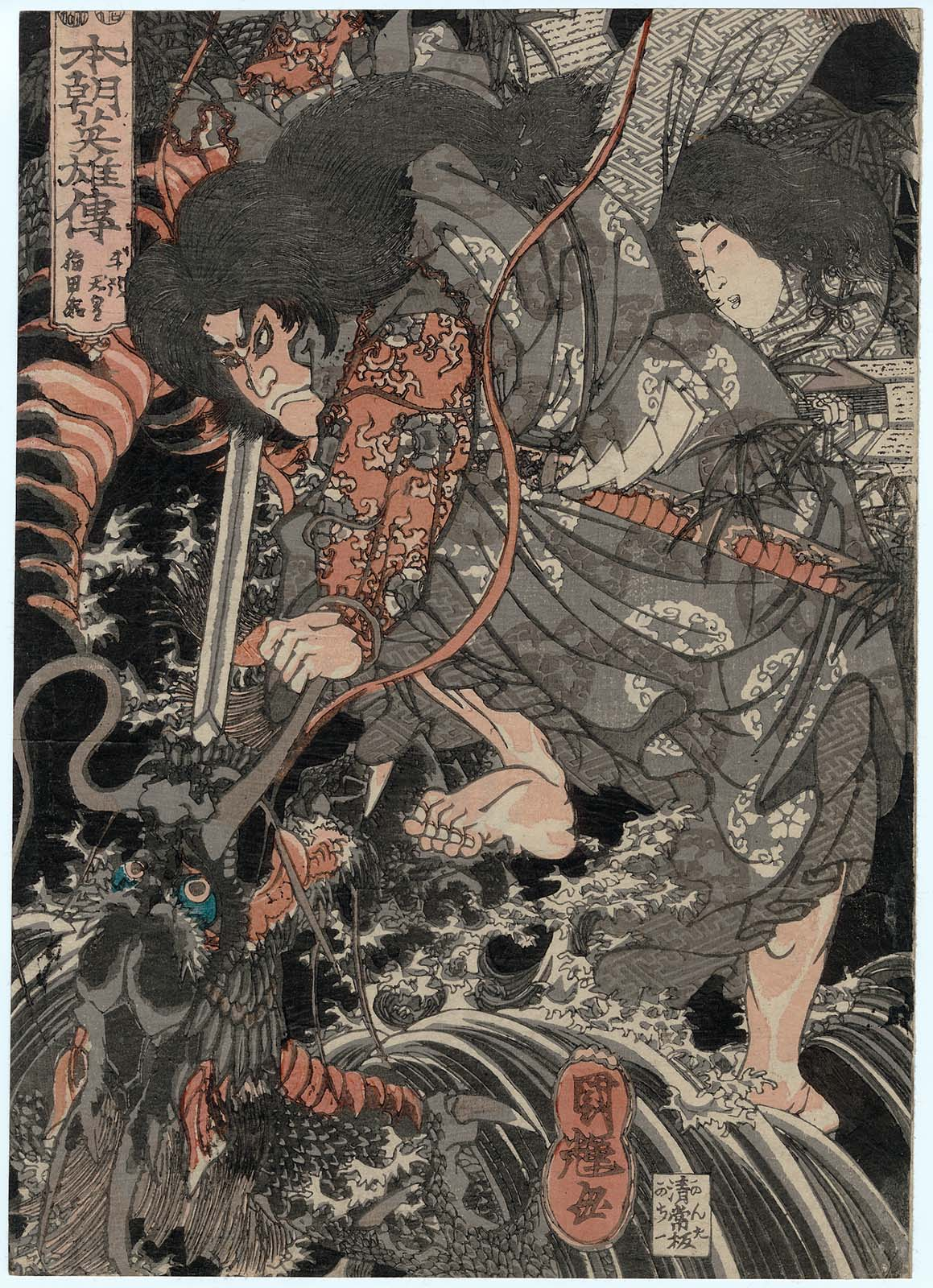
Susanoo kills the Yamata no Orochi. (Utagawa Kuniteru)

There may be some connections to other foreign deities as well especially with the most commonly mentioned Susanoo-no-Mikoto, brother of kami Amaterasu.

A few myths, such as that of Susanoo's descent in Soshimori in Silla, seem to suggest a connection between the god and the Korean peninsula. Indeed, some scholars have hypothesized that the deities who were eventually conflated with Susanoo, Mutō Tenjin, and Gozu Tennō, may have had Korean origins as well, with the name "Mutō" (武塔, historical orthography: mutau) being linked with the Korean word mudang "shamaness", and "Gozu" being explained as a calque of "Soshimori", here interpreted as being derived from a Korean toponym meaning "Bull's (so) Head (mari)". For further information, see etymology of the title "Uzumasa". The name "Susanoo" itself has been interpreted as being related to the Middle Korean title susung (transliterated as 次次雄 or 慈充), meaning "master" or "shaman", notably applied to Namhae, the second king of Silla, in the Samguk sagi. Susanoo is thus supposed in this view to have originally been a foreign god (蕃神, banshin), perhaps a deified shaman, whose origins may be traced back to Korea.

The theories surrounding Susanoo being introduced to Japan as a foreign god coincide with other kamis such as Inari, and may have been introduced in a similar fashion. Their Silla roots (Inari–Hata; Shinra Myōjin–Ōtomo; Susanoo/Gozu Tennō–Soshimori) may indicate that the kamis were originally from the peninsula until they were brought over to Japan by Korean immigrants. Ironically, the origins of kamis such as Susanoo was retrospectively used as a tool to justify the Japanese annexation of Korea and the assimilation of its people, claiming that Susanoo was a native Japanese god that first arrived and founded Silla, rather than a Silla-originating god that moved to Japan. Elder Shinto priest, Tsunoda Tadayuki postulated that Susanoo was in fact analogous with Dangun, a native Korean deity (Note: "Tsunoda identified Dangun with Susano-o-no-mikoto 素戔嗚尊 (a younger brother of Amaterasu in Japanese myths) in light of the supposed mythological relations between Korea and Japan in antiquity. This was also a compromise between the Hirata school’s ethnocentric Shinto ideal—“Japan as the origin of the world"—and the latest theory concerning "the identical origins of Japanese and Koreans" advocated by some historians and anthropologists. Further, Tsunoda's interest in Dangun coincided with the emergence of a Korean nationalism focused on this deity. Thus the Shintoists’ petition reverberated beyond their original intent; when the Japanese government faced the March First Independent Movement of 1919 in Korea, Tsunoda's opinion concerning Dangun was quoted by a group of liberal Diet members to accuse the colonial government of misrule. Then, around the time of the inauguration ceremony of the Chōsen Shrine on 15 October 1925, several Shinto activists, including leading figures in the priesthood, petitioned the Governor-General to enshrine Dangun in it." — Suga Kōji, A Concept of “Overseas Shinto Shrines” – A Pantheistic Attempt by Ogasawara Shōzō and Its Limitations) and advocated the amalgamation of the Japanese kami with the Korean god. A similar phenomenon happened prior with Susanoo and Gozu Tennō, another foreign god that may have Korean origin.

==== Jewish ancestry theory ====
The hypothesis that the Hata clan was a Jewish Nestorian tribe was proposed by Saeki Yoshiro in 1908. Saeki developed a theory described by Ben-Ami Shillony as being "somewhat similar" to that advanced by Nicholas McLeod in 1879.

The Star of David is often compared with the Hata clan's Kagome mon.

In 1879, the Scottish businessman Nicholas McLeod who had lived in Japan since 1867 published a book in Nagasaki called Japan and the Lost Tribes of Israel. Based on "personal research and observation", the book claimed the Japanese as the descendants of the Ten Lost Tribes. Over thirty years later, in 1908, Saeki Yoshiro (better known as P. Y. Saeki) (1872–1965) published a book in which he developed a somewhat similar theory. According to Saeki, the Hata clan, which arrived from Korea and settled in Japan in the third century, was a Jewish-Nestorian tribe. Saeki's writings spread the theory about "the common ancestry of the Japanese and the Jews" (Nichiyu dōsoron) in Japan, a theory that was endorsed by some Christian groups at the time.

This theory gained traction due to its peculiar premise and projection. Some posited that the people of Japan's Jewish heritage is reflected on their unique culture such as the presence of the Jindai moji, an allegedly "native Japanese" writing system that was introduced before the adoption of Chinese characters, however many of these claims are considered separate and mostly hoaxes. Other claims include the similarity between the Star of David and the Kagome mon of the Hata clan. However, except for both symbols being Trihexagonal tilings, their conceptions are detached and separate with the Star of David deriving from the Seal of Solomon, while the Kagome mon deriving from a woven bamboo pattern (also known as the kagome lattice).

Though it is considered as pseudoscience and pseudohistory, the emphasis on the "Japanese–Hata–Jewish ancestry" theory was widely used as a mean to differentiate the Japanese race with other neighboring ethnicities, especially degrading the Han Chinese as ethnically "inferior" and "different" from the Japanese in the 20th century. For ethnicities such as the Koreans and Ryukyuans, they were considered "part of the Japanese race" and were assimilated. Much like Nissen dōsoron (lit. 'Theory on Japanese‑Korean Common Ancestry') and Nichiryū dōsoron (lit. 'Theory on Japanese‑Ryukyuan Common Ancestry'), the "Japanese-Jewish origin theory" is believed to be part of a common trend that began in the 19th century Japan to trace a common ancestry with neighboring ethnic groups (ones that are genetically related to the Japanese the most). However, unlike the aforementioned two, the "Japanese-Jewish common ancestry theory" also known as "Nichiyu dōsoron (日ユ同祖論)" is currently disregarded by both Japanese historians and scientists due to lack of historical, archaeological and genealogical evidence.

Scientifically, there is no proof available, including modern DNA analysis, to support this hypothesis. A recently published study of the genetic origins of Japanese people does not support a genealogical link as put forward by Saeki. Researcher and author Jon Entine emphasizes that DNA evidence excludes the possibility of significant links between the Japanese and the Jews.

In essence, the Hata clan and in turn, the Japanese are not related to the Ten Lost Tribes of ancient Samaria (Israel) and do not possess any Jewish heritage. Later, a similar fringe theory was given to its descendant clan known as the Shimazu clan (see Shimazu clan#Christian ancestry theory).

==== Chronology of the Hata clan ====
Realistically, the Hata clan most likely existed prior to any of the accounts made in the sources and their years of publication. The clan's name, written in three separate characters (羽田/波多/秦) throughout history, most likely had a common root word that possessed the pronunciation of "Hata (はた)" and can be suspected to have had a common ancestor clan as well.

Order	Characters	Founder	Origin	Year	Sources	Note
1	羽田	Hata no Yashiro (羽田矢代)	Japan	1st–2nd century (?)	Kojiki (712) Nihon Shoki (720)	(Note: First clan to use the pronunciation of "Hata". Hata no Yashiro's father, Takenouchi no Sukune is believed to be a fictional individual whose accomplishments have been aggrandized. Therefore, his son, Hata no Yashiro is also believed to have been fictional.)
2	波多	Hata no Yashiro (羽田矢代)	Japan	1st–2nd century (?)	Nihon Shoki (720)	(Note: Possibly a cadet branch of the pre-existing Hata clan and/or sister clan under different name.)
3	?	Yuzuki no Kimi (弓月君)	Paekche	2nd century	Nihon Shoki (720)	(Note: In the Nihon Shoki, a clan name was never specified, and it was the Shinsen Shōjiroku where Yuzuki no Kimi being the founder of a "Hata clan" is first mentioned. However, due to Yuzuki no Kimi most likely being a fictional individual, the likelihood of Yuzuki's "Hata clan" being a separately introduced foreign clan is most likely false. Therefore, it can be deduced that it was a pre-existing clan within Japan and may possibly be the same Hata clan allegedly founded by Hata no Yashiro as it shares the same characters and pronunciations.)
4	波多	Sakanoue no Ara (坂上阿良)	Japan	8th century	Shoku Nihongi (797)	(Note: Sakanoue clan is a cadet branch clan of the Yamato no Aya clan, a clan believed to have immigrated from Paekche. The founder, Achi no Omi, similar to Yuzuki no Kimi, is also believed to be a fictional individual and was given a similar treatment in Shoku Nihongi and Shinsen Shōjiroku where he was claimed to be the descendant of Emperor Ling of Han. In actuality, the clan is believed to have come from Ara Gaya. Sakanoue no Ara, a member of the Sakanoue clan, most likely founded the new Hata clan and named it under the characters "波多" due to him and his clan's foreign origin and to commemorate the name by continuing its legacy.)
5	秦	Yuzuki no Kimi (弓月君)	Qin dynasty	2nd century (Added later on to Yuzuki no Kimi's naturalized clan)	Shinsen Shōjiroku (815)	(Note: A likely renaming of the pre-existing Hata clan by incorporating Yuzuki no Kimi and his once-nameless clan during the publication of Shinsen Shōjiroku. As noted above, the possibility of Yuzuki no Kimi and his clan being autonomous is unlikely, therefore, it can be deduced that the claim found in the Shinsen Shōjiroku is most likely fictional too.)
6	秦	Yuzuki no Kimi (弓月君)	Kingdom of Israel	2nd century (Added later on to Yuzuki no Kimi's naturalized clan)	Nichiyu dōsoron (17th century)	(Note: A 17th century fringe theory created by João Rodrigues Tçuzu based on controversial takes that lack any historical, archaeological or scientific evidence. It mostly uses pseudohistorical methods to link the Hata clan with the Japanese people, and in turn, the Koreans to the Ten Lost Tribes of Israel. The claim is disregarded by most scholars in the 21st century.)

Historically, the oldest records of "Hata" can be traced to Hata no Yashiro. However, as mentioned above, due to his father, Takenouchi no Sukune being considered as a work of fiction or at least an individual with aggrandized accomplishments, Hata no Yashiro's existence (alongside his siblings) is also often scrutinized and is deemed similar to his father. Regardless of the historical accuracy surrounding the lineage, the family and its members are heavily involved in events that surround Japan and Silla.

- Takenouchi no Sukune's name may have appeared in ancient Korean records under "Udojugun (于道朱君/우도주군)". Since his name was pronounced as "Utusukune (内宿禰)" in Old Japanese, "Udojugun" and "Utusukune" may have been the same individual. Sources such as the Wakan Sansai Zue also mentions Takenouchi no Sukune's accomplishments during the Silla–Japan War (新羅・倭戦争) further adding credence to his involvement during the Silla period.
- He is also best known for his service as Grand Minister (Ōomi) to the Regent Empress Jingū. The empress, who was also of Silla descent through Amenohiboko, allegedly invaded Silla as a quest to reclaim her "promised land (Korea)". It is said that Takenouchi no Sukune was crucial to the Silla–Japan affairs during her reign.
  - Hata no Yashiro (羽田矢代) was the son of Takenouchi no Sukune and was the founder of the Hata clan (波多), a clan that is believed to have roots in Silla.
  - Heguri no Tsuku was the son of Takenouchi no Sukune and was the individual who supposedly went to Silla to rescue Yuzuki no Kimi and his fellow clan members to help them safely immigrate to Japan. They later naturalized and became the Hata clan (秦).
  - Soga no Ishikawa (蘇我石川) was the son of Takenouchi no Sukune and was the founder of the Soga clan, a clan that is believed to have foreign roots according to world renowned linguists such as Alexander Vovin, specifically to that of Silla due to phonetic similarities (see Soga clan#Toraijin theory).

Due to the strong connections with Silla, the precursor to the Hata clan (and/or other clans founded by Takenouchi no Sukune's sons) is believed to have foreign roots regardless of the authenticity of its respective founders and their stories. Furthermore, it can be suspected that the numerous clans under "Hata" existed prior to the stories given to them and they likely had a common root, a foreign clan named "Pada" that immigrated to Japan from Silla as Toraijins at the start of the Kofun period (circa mid-late 5th century).

== Etymology ==
Origins surrounding the clan's name and jargons show strong foreign influence with many tracing their roots to Old Korean. For context, Kazuo Miyamoto (宮本 一夫), a linguist and emeritus professor at Kyushu University postulates that Central Japanese (the main language spoken in the capital of Yamato) was a proto-Japonic language that was affected by proto-Koreanic due to large influx of migration from the peninsula. (Note: "Central Japanese was heavily influenced by Old Korean during the Kofun and Asuka periods, from the 4th to 7th centuries AD [...] the homeland of both languages is the same based on archeological evidence, and they are kindred language families [...] Proto-Japonic and Proto-Koreanic split off from the Transeurasian languages in southern Manchuria." — Kazuo Miyamoto) Miyamoto posited that the proto-Japonic and proto-Koreanic languages, though not entirely the same, were "kindred languages" both stemming from a common root found in northern Eurasia. Other linguists specializing in Asian languages such as Alexander Vovin and Christopher I. Beckwith also suggest a major influence of the Korean language in Japan during the Kofun period; noting the many changes in the Japanese language's grammar and adoption of non-native words that were included in classical works such as the Kojiki. Out of these immigrants who influenced Old Japanese, many are likely Toraijin clans (including the Hata clan) who became prominent families that asserted their native language into the imperial court and other areas within their jurisdiction. Hence many of the words surrounding them show foreign roots.

=== Clan name – Hata ===
The etymology of "Hata" is believed to be "Hada" (肌) meaning "skin" alluding to the silk produced by the immigrants, or "Hada/Hata" a Japanese translation of the Korean word "Pada (바다)" meaning "ocean" as they came across the seas. In recent years, the latter is believed to be the more likely theory.

In Old Japanese, "Hata" would have sounded closer to "Pada" as the consonant [h] was pronounced as [p] and [t] was pronounced as [d]. As explained above, the name of the province "Padan (波旦)" of Silla was carried over to Japan as "Pada (波多)" where its meaning of "ocean" was introduced and eventually became "Hata" in Japanese. Another offshoot word stemming from "Pada/Hata (ocean)" is believed to be "Wata" (海) which also means "ocean". It later adopted the "渡" character to include the meaning of "crossing the ocean" as seen in "渡る". (Note: 『「渡（わた）」は単純に「渡る」の意味でしょうが、[...] また「海」のことを「ワタ」というので、それに由来するという説も可能です。 「波」は単純に音読みにしただけでしょう。』 "Wata (渡) probably means simply 'to cross,' [...] but Wata (海) is also the Japanese word for 'ocean', therefore it's possible that it comes from that. Wata (波) is likely just an On'yomi." — City of Ishinomaki)

In Old Korean to Middle Korean, the use of "波多" to represent the Korean word "바다/ocean" lasted until the late 18th century as mentioned in the book Gogeumseokrim (1789) which focuses on Middle Korean and its daily vocabulary. (Note: 『波多。本朝。俗稱海爲波多、今訛爲「바다」。』 "波多 [contemporary] means "ocean". Currently, it has been simplified to 바다." — Gogeumseokrim (고금석림/古今釋林), 《古今釋林 27、東韓譯語、釋地》)

*Old pronunciation
*Padan [kor] (波旦)	→	*Pada [kor] (波多)	→	Pada (波多)	→	Hata (はた)	→	Hata (波多)	→	Hata (秦)
		↓		↓		↓				
		Pada [kor] (바다)		Wata (海)		Hata (羽田)				
				↓						
Wata (渡)

=== Title – Uzumasa ===
"Uzumasa (太秦)" is considered as the oldest title created under the Hata clan. Through its characters represented by the word for "big" (太) and the clan's own name (秦), the title is said to be a representation of the meaning of "mounting (big) amount of tribute (silk)" according to the Nihon Shoki. However, the oldest title of the clan did not originate from the aforementioned characters. Instead, it is stated in the Nihon Shoki that the etymology of Uzumasa came from "Uzumasa (禹豆満佐)", an older spelling of the title. It is said that the original spelling's pronunciation carried over to the newer characters and retained its meaning, despite having no connections with the etymology itself. (Note: 『雄略天皇の御世、 渡来系の豪族秦氏（秦酒公）が絹を「うず高く積んだ」ことから「禹豆満佐＝うずまさ」の号を与えられ、これに「太秦」の漢字表記を当てた。』 "During the reign of Emperor Yūryaku, the powerful Toraijin family known as the Hata clan (through Hata no Sakeno Kimi) was given the title 'Uzumasa' for 'creating a mountain of silk'. This title is believed to have originated from '禹豆満佐' and uses the characters '太秦' to represent it." — Nihon Shoki) In the footnotes of the Nihon Shoki, it is said that the original spelling also had a root word that was read "Uzumorimasa (禹豆母利麻佐)".

According to historian Shōei Mishina, "Uzumasa" is a combination of two separate words, "Uzu" and "Masa" which meant "clan" and "leader", respectively. Mishina posited that "Uzu" was also represented by multiple characters (such as 珍/嚴/貴) and "Masa" as "勝". He stated that "-masa", similar to titles such as "-suguri (村主, すぐり)" seen in Musasuguri (牟佐村主) and "-kishi (吉士, きし)" seen in Achikishi and Wanikishi, was a suffix title given to individuals with Toraijin background and deemed it to possess Old Korean roots. He also discussed about the etymology behind "Uzu (禹豆)" and its older form, "Uzumori (禹豆母利)". Mishina stated that the separation of "Uzu-masa" should also apply to its older spelling "Uzumori-masa", and stated that the word "Uzumori" most likely had ties with the Korean word "Udumeori (우두머리)" which literally means "leader of a clan". He posited that "Udu (우두)" meant "cow head (牛頭)" with "Meori (머리)" meaning "head", (Note: "Meori (머리)" is the modern pronunciation. Historically, head was pronounced "Mari (마리)" in Middle Korean, and was most likely pronounced "Mori (모리)" in Old Korean.) the latter being the native Korean word that represented the overall meaning of the words prior. (Note: However, Korean sources do not allude to a Chinese character-based etymology, claiming that "Udu (우두)" stems from the native Korean word "Widu (위두)" as attested in the Beonyeok sohak (1517), which most likely meant "high" based on the word "Wi (위)" pronounced "Ui (우이)" in Middle Korean, which meant "up" (also a possible cognate to Japanese "Ue (うえ)" of the same meaning).) In essence, "Uzumori-masa (禹豆母利麻佐)" meant "Leader of the clan-[title]" which was later shortened to "Uzu-masa (禹豆満佐)" and changed characters to "太秦" when the Hata clan adopted new characters for its clan name.

*Old pronunciation
Udumeori [kor] (牛頭머리)	→	*Udumori-masa [kor] (牛頭모리-勝)	→	Uzumori-masa (禹豆母利麻佐)	→	Uzu-masa (禹豆満佐)	→	Uzumasa (太秦)

A possible connection to Uzumasa and another ancient word of possible Korean origin can be made based on Mishina's observations. As Mishina posited that "Uzumori" was the ancestral word for Uzumasa which carried the meaning of "cow head", it may also share similar roots with "Soshimori (曾尸茂梨)", a placename in Silla where the kami Susanoo first arrived after his exit from the heavens (see Susanoo in Soshimori).

The Mii-dera temple claims that "Soshimori" likely alludes to the Korean word "Someori (소머리)" which means "cow head" (noting that "So (소)" is the native Korean word for "cow"). The temple officially claims that "Soshimori" most likely derived from "Someori" or more likely "Suhsomeori (숳소머리)" meaning "bull head" in Old Korean, (Note: The prefix "su- (수)" means "male" in native Korean. In Middle Korean, it was pronounced "suh- (숳)", therefore, it can be deduced that it was pronounced "su*h- (the [h] sounding separately)" in Old Korean. Due to the [h] being pronounced separately, it most likely carried over to the next [s] consonant in "su*h-somori" which likely made it sound closer to "Sushomori".) under an alternate spelling "牛首茂梨" which later influenced the introduction of Gozu Tennō (牛頭天王, lit. 'Ox-Headed Heavenly King') who was eventually amalgamated with Susanoo.

*Old pronunciation
Gozu Tennō (牛頭天王)	←	Susanoo (スサノオ)	←	Soshimori (曾尸茂梨)	←	Soshimori (牛首茂梨)	←	*Suhsomori [kor] (숳소모리)	←	Someori [kor] (소머리)	→	*Udumori-masa [kor] (牛頭모리-勝)	→	Uzumori-masa (禹豆母利麻佐)	→	Uzu-masa (禹豆満佐)	→	Uzumasa (太秦)

The common Silla element of Hata, Uzumasa, Susanoo, Soshimori, and Old Korean may explain the singularity across all the aforementioned factors, with many of them most likely sharing a collective root.

== Influence ==
The Hata were the most prominent inhabitants of the Kyoto basin at the time the area entered into history, in the 6th and 7th centuries. They had jurisdiction in present-day "Uzumasa (太秦/太秦)" (not to be confused with the title "Uzumasa") found in "Kadono district (葛野郡)" within Kyoto.

The Hata are said to have been adept at financial matters, and to have introduced silk raising and weaving to Japan. For this reason, they may have been associated with the kagome crest, a lattice shape found in basket-weaving. During the reign of Emperor Nintoku (313–399), the members of the clan were sent to different parts of the country to spread the knowledge and practice of sericulture. Members of this clan also served as financial advisors to the Yamato Court for several centuries. Originally landing and settling in Izumo and the San'yō region, the Hata eventually settled in the areas where Japan's most important cities are now. They are said to have aided in the establishment of Heian-kyō (modern-day Kyoto), and of many Shinto shrines and Buddhist temples, including Fushimi Inari Taisha, Matsunoo Taisha, and Kōryū-ji. Emperor Yūryaku granted the clan the family name of Uzumasa in 471, in honor of Sakeno kimi's contributions to the spread of sericulture. Over the next few centuries, they were given the right to the status (kabane) of Miyatsuko, and later Imiki.

Uzumasa-no-Kimi-Sukune, one of the first clan heads, arrived during the reign of Emperor Chūai, in the 2nd century CE. According to the Nihon Shoki, he and his followers were greeted warmly, and Uzumasa was granted a high government position.

A number of future samurai clans, including the Chōsokabe clan of Shikoku, the Kawakatsu clan of Tanba, and the Jinbō clan of Echigo province, claimed descent from the Hata. The Koremune clan was related to the Hata as well. Prince Koman-O came to dwell in Japan in the reign of Emperor Ōjin (c. 310). His successors received the name Hata. This name was changed to Koremune in 880. The wife of Shimazu Tadahisa (1179–1227) (son of Minamoto no Yoritomo and ancestor of the Shimazu clan of Kyushu), was a daughter of Koremune Hironobu. However, the claim in regards to Shimazu Tadahisa being the son of Minamoto no Yorimoto is often scrutinized since neither the characters or historical documents are correctly recorded and is believed to be an embellished claim (similar to Oda-Taira, Sanada-Minamoto, etc.). Hence, it is believed by modern scholars that Shimazu Tadahisa was also of Koremune descent, making the Shimazu the direct descendants of the Hata clan.

The Hata were also claimed as ancestors by Zeami Motokiyo, the premiere Noh playwright in history, who attributed the origins of Noh to Hata no Kawakatsu. According to Zeami's writings, Kōkatsu, the ancestor of both the Kanze and Komparu Noh lineages, introduced ritual dances to Japan in the sixth century; this form would later evolve into Okina and then into Noh. A more important influence upon the formation and the character of Noh is the Chinese Nuo rite. While sanyue (sangaku) and daqu influenced the development of Noh in terms of dramatic structure and presentation, the Nuo rite played a significant role in formulating Noh's religious and ritualistic character and features.

In recent years, the population of Neyagawa in Osaka Prefecture includes a number of people who claim descent from the Hata. However, the cities of Ōhata and Yahata are not directly related to the Hata clan.

== Notable members ==
- Yuzuki no Kimi – Founder of the clan.
- Hata no Kawakatsu

== See also ==
- Japanese clans#Immigrant clans: List of Toraijin clans of different origins.
  - Aya clan
  - Tatara clan
  - Toyoda clan
  - Ōtomo clan
- Nichiyu dōsoron (lit. 'Theory on Japanese‑Jewish Common Ancestry')
  - British Israelism: A similar hypothesis that holds the British people to be a Lost Tribe of Israel.
  - Ten Lost Tribes
  - Genetic studies on Jews

== Sources ==
- Frederic, Louis (2002). "Japan Encyclopedia." Cambridge, Massachusetts: Harvard University Press.
- Rimer, J. Thomas and Yamazaki Masakazu trans. (1984). "On the Art of the Nō Drama: The Major Treatises of Zeami." Princeton, New Jersey: Princeton University Press.
- Teshima, Ikuro (1973). The Ancient Refugees From Religious Persecution in Japan: The Tribe of Hada – Their Religious and Cultural Influence. 1.
