= Kawakatsu =

Kawakatsu is a Japanese surname. People with this name include:

- Kawakatsu clan (川勝氏)
- Heita Kawakatsu (川勝 平太, born 1946), former governor of Shizuoka Prefecture, Japan
- Hiroyasu Kawakatsu (川勝 博康, born, 1975), former football player
- Masaharu Kawakatsu (川勝 正治, born 1929), Japanese zoologist
- Ryoichi Kawakatsu (川勝 良一, born 1958), former football player
- Saburo Kawakatsu (born 1974) mixed martial artist
