= Theory of Kashmiri descent from lost tribes of Israel =

Theory that the Kashmiri people are descendants of the Ten Lost Tribes

The theory of Kashmiri descent from the lost tribes of Israel is a fringe theory which states that the Kashmiri people originally descended from the Ten Lost Tribes. Genetic testing and historical analysis have not proven this theory, though it still maintains minimal support in the Ahmadiyya movement.

== History ==
In 1899 Mirza Ghulam Ahmad, founder of the Ahmadiyya movement, theorized that Jesus had survived the crucifixion and traveled to Kashmir to find and preach to the lost tribes of Israel. Ahmad claimed that Jesus lived in Kashmir, had children, died aged 120, and was buried in Srinagar.

However, some historians believe that by claiming roots in Semitic monotheism, Kashmiri Muslims are attempting to separate themselves from their ancestral polytheistic religions.

Despite claiming a genealogical connection, many South Asian Muslim groups show antagonism towards Jews. Scholars believe this roots from negative interpretations of Quran references to Jews and also from decades of Arab-Israel conflict.

== Basis in tribal names and toponymy ==
The theory is essentially based on the purported similarities between Kashmir place names and Hebrew words and phrases by Ahmadiyya scholars.

Some examples include

- Bandpoor (similar to Beth Peor)
- Naboo Hill (similar to Mount Nebo)
- Pishgah (similar to Mount Pisgah)
- Mamre (similar to Mamre)

== Genetics ==
Using genome-wide genotyping and admixture detection methods, it was determined there are no significant or substantial signs of Jewish admixture, among 16 Sephardi and/or Ashkenazi Jewish populations surveyed, in modern-day Kashmiris.

== See also ==
- Japanese-Jewish common ancestry theory
- Khazar hypothesis of Ashkenazi ancestry
- Theories of Pashtun origin
