= Japanese-Jewish common ancestry theory =

Fringe theory

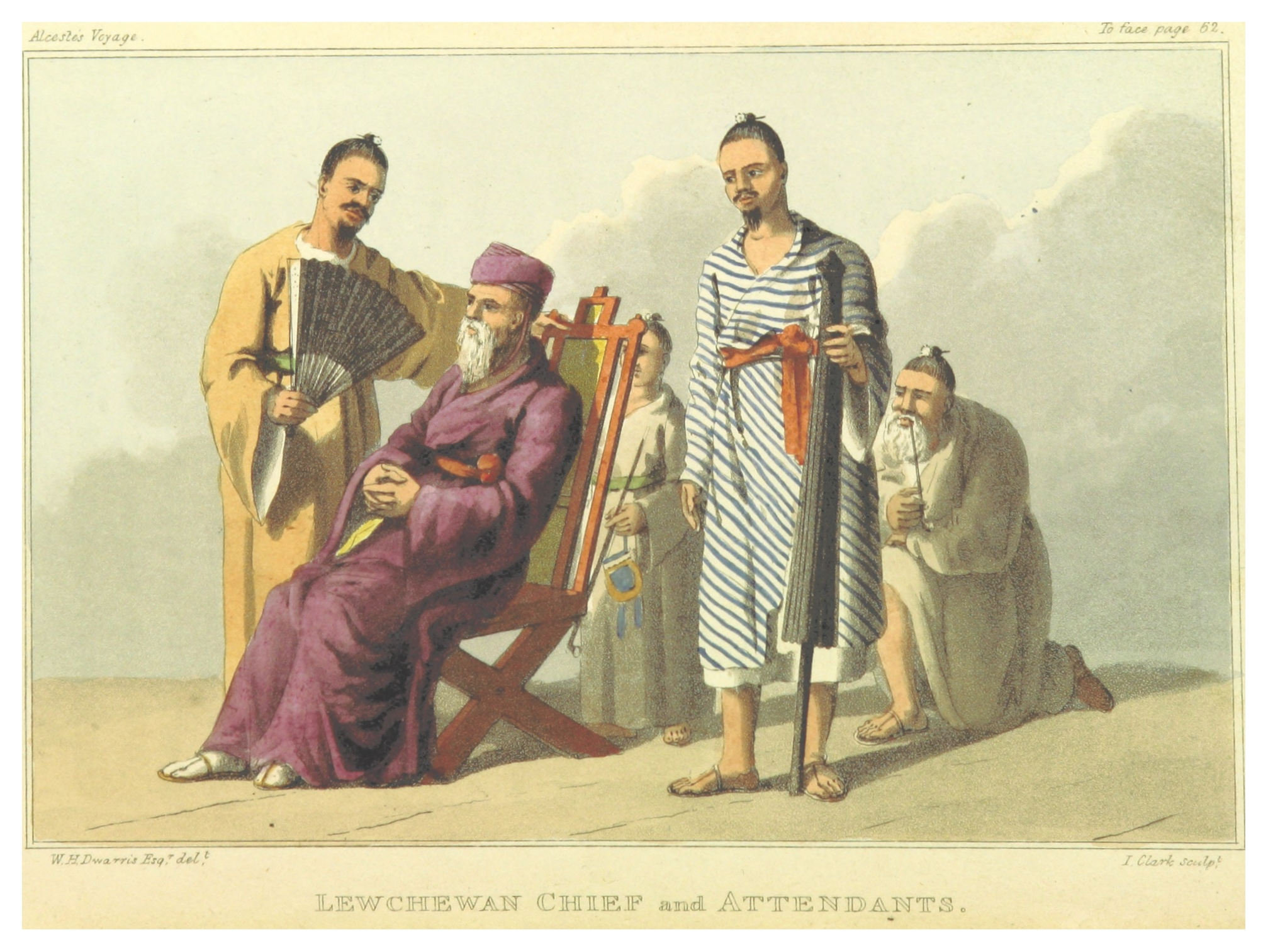
Missionary Nicholas McLeod (author of the image) propagated the theory that the Japanese people originated from the Ten Lost Tribes of Israel. Here, he depicts people of the Ryukyu Islands.

The Japanese-Jewish common ancestry theory (日ユ同祖論, Nichiyu Dōsoron) is a fringe theory that appeared in the 17th century as a hypothesis which claimed the Japanese people were the main part of the Ten Lost Tribes of Israel. A later version portrayed them as descendants of a tribe of Central Asian Jewish converts to Nestorian Christianity. Some versions of the theory applied to the whole population, but others only claimed that a specific group within the Japanese people had descended from Jews.

Tudor Parfitt writes that "the spread of the fantasy of Israelite origin ... forms a consistent feature of the Western colonial enterprise", stating,

It is in fact in Japan that we can trace the most remarkable evolution in the Pacific of an imagined Judaic past. As elsewhere in the world, the theory that aspects of the country were to be explained via an Israelite model was introduced by Western agents.

Researcher and author Jon Entine emphasizes that DNA evidence excludes the possibility of significant links between Japanese and Jews.

== Origins ==
During the Age of Discovery, European explorers attempted to connect many peoples with whom they first came into contact to the Ten Lost Tribes, sometimes in conjunction with attempts to introduce Christian missionaries. The first person to identify the Lost Tribes with an East Asian nation was João Rodrigues (1561–1634), a Jesuit missionary and interpreter. In 1608, he argued that the Chinese descended from the Lost Tribes of Israel. He believed that the Chinese sages Confucius and Laozi took their ideas from Judaism. Rodrigues later abandoned this theory. In his Historia da Igreja do Japão he argued that Japan was populated in two waves of immigration from the mainland, one group originating from Zhejiang, and the other from Korea.

According to Parfitt, "the first full-blown development of the theory was put forward by Nicholas McLeod, a Scot who started his career in the herring industry before he ended up in Japan as a missionary". In 1870 McLeod published Epitome of the Ancient History of Japan. According to Zvi Ben-Dor Benite, MacLeod had been a missionary who spent decades in Japan and Korea "searching for the true Israelites". and Illustrations to the Epitome of the Ancient History of Japan, claiming that the Japanese people included descendants of the Lost Tribes of Israel, who formed the aristocracy and traditional priestly castes. Evidence cited for this theory included similarities between the legends of Emperor Jimmu and Moses, the presence of "Portuguese-Jewish" racial features on some Japanese, and similarities between Shinto and Judaism.

== Impact in Japan ==
These theories had little impact in Japan, although recently they were translated into Japanese and published in Japan. Other books, by Joseph Eidelberg (1916 – 1985), which claimed to support these theories, were translated to Japanese, sold in over 40,000 copies and covered in a Japanese Television series of seven episodes.

However, in 1908, Saeki Yoshiro (1872–1965), a professor at Waseda University, published a book in which he developed a variant on the theory. Yoshiro was an expert on Japanese Nestorianism. Saeki theorised that the Hata clan, which arrived from Korea and settled in Japan in the third century, was a Jewish-Nestorian tribe. According to Ben-Ami Shillony, "Saeki's writings spread the theory about 'the common ancestry of the Japanese and the Jews' (Nichiyu Dōsoron) in Japan, a theory that was endorsed by some Christian groups."

There is no genetic evidence available, including modern DNA analysis, to support this hypothesis. A recently published study into the genetic origins of Japanese people does not support a genealogical link as put forward by Saeki.

== Impact elsewhere ==
The Japanese-Jewish common ancestor theory has been seen as one of the attempts by European racial scientists to explain Japan's rapid modernization, in contrast to that of the other "inferior" or "degraded" Asians, especially the Chinese. The theory itself, however, was taken in different directions.

=== Jews in China ===
The same year the book by Saeki on the theory was published an article promoting yet another version of the theory appeared in Israel's Messenger, a magazine published by the Shanghai Zionist Federation. Whereas McLeod had claimed that the priest caste and ruling class of Japan were descendants of Jews, the article published by the Shanghai group offered a more proletarian version of the theory. Shillony writes that:

Its author claimed, contrary to what McLeod had written, that it was the outcasts of Japan, the Eta (or Ety as the article rendered the term), who were the descendants of Jews.

The author of the article said that, like the Jews in the West, the Japanese Eta were hard working people, especially associated with the shoemaking industry who also lived in ghettos, "not that the Japanese compel them to do so, but they seem to prefer to be isolated from the rest of the population". The author also claimed that the Eta observed Jewish customs: "In the ghetto of Nagasaki, for example, the Ety observe the Sabbath very religiously. Not only do they not work on that day of the week, but they do not smoke nor kindle fires, just like the Orthodox Jews."

According to Shillony, "This ludicrous and totally groundless story was neither challenged nor refuted in later issues of the magazine."

=== Christian Zionism ===
Ben-Ami Shillony also describes a letter subsequently published by the same magazine, written by Elizabeth A. Gordon, a former lady-in-waiting to Queen Victoria who was also a prominent Christian Zionist. Gordon attempts to link Japan to British Israelism, particularly the view that the British royal family were of Israelite descent. Gordon was well known in Japan, where she was researching Shingon Buddhism, which, she claimed, had Christian origins. In her 1921 letter she adopted a "fantastic chain of reasoning" to prove that "the meeting between the Japanese and British crown princes signified the long-awaited reunion of Judah and Israel". Gordon had some influence at the time in Japan.

== See also ==
- Israel–Japan relations
- Khazar theory of Ashkenazi ancestry
- Makuya
- Theories of Pashtun origin
- Theory of Kashmiri descent from lost tribes of Israel
- Tomb of Jesus in Shingō
- Hata clan
- Nissen dōsoron
- Nichiryū dōsoron (in Japanese) : Theory that reinforces the idea that the Japanese people and the neighboring Ryukyuan people share a common ancestry.
- Chiune Sugihara
