= Joseph Eidelberg =

Israeli historian (1916–1985)

- יוסף אידלברג
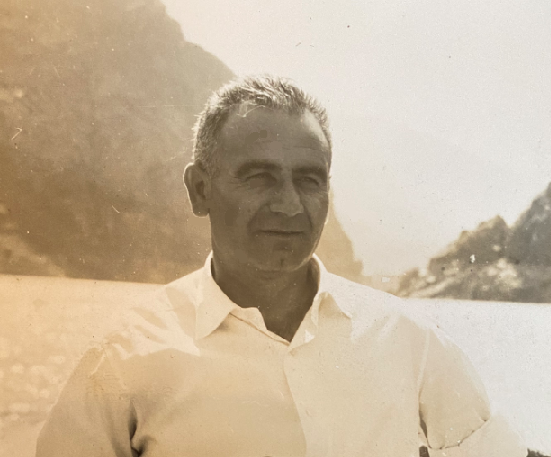
- Joseph Eidelberg in 1964
- Born: February 8, 1916; Odessa, Russian Empire (now Ukraine)
- Died: August 21, 1985 (aged 69)
- Occupations: Military commander, plant manager, linguistics researcher, historian, author
- Known for: Research on the Exodus and the Ten Lost Tribes of Israel

Joseph Eidelberg (Hebrew: יוסף אידלברג; February 8, 1916 – August 21, 1985) was an Israeli military commander and a plant manager of large Israeli corporations. During his career he developed a hobby of exploring religions’ roots and languages. He became a linguistics researcher, a scholar speaking seven languages, an Historian explorer, and an author of three books. His research work focused on the two most puzzling mysteries in Jewish history: The Exodus, a 40-year desert travel of the Israelites from Egypt to Canaan, and the Ten Lost Tribes of Israel, which were never found. A summary in his memory was written by his friend Colonel (ret.) Meir Pa'il (Hebrew: מאיר פעיל). A professional opinion on Eidelberg's work was detailed by Harold Goldmeier, a former Research and Teaching Fellow at Harvard University. His research claimed to show evidence that the Exodus journey took place in North Africa including Nigeria, the land of Igbo Jews, and to have found evidence supporting the Japanese-Jewish common ancestry theory. Publications of work by Eidelberg, from 1972 to 2015, amount to "15 works, in 35 publications, in 3 languages and 153 library holdings".

== Early life ==
Eidelberg was born to Haim and Clara in Odessa. At the age of 7, his family moved to Mandatory Palestine (now Israel), where they lived in Jerusalem and in Haifa. At age 22, he went to England to pursue engineering. Shortly after, before World War II, he returned to Palestine and volunteered for the British Army as a special security officer of the Notrim. He later joined the Haganah served as the communication officer of the Haifa district, joined "Am Lohem" (Hebrew: "עם לוחם"), (Fighting Nation) and in 1943 he headed "Am Lohem" organization. He fought in the 1947–1949 Palestine war in 1948 and continued serving as a Major in the Israeli Defense Forces for five more years.^{[1]}

== Engineering Management Career ==
During his military service in the Israeli Defense Forces (IDF) (1948-1953) Eidelberg served as the Engineering Corps (Hebrew: חיל הנדסה) Base Commander in Sarafand (Tzrifin). He completed paratrooper training and graduated from the Battalion Commanders' College of the IDF with Meir Pa'il ^{[1]} . During his military service, he initiated a process of rapid clay housing construction and pre-military vocational training for young adults. After his discharge from the IDF in 1953, he went to the US to finish his Mechanical Engineering studies at Tri State College (Trine University) in Angola, Indiana. Eidelberg completed his engineering studies in 1955.

As described in Pa'il's memorial note ^{[1]}, Eidelberg managed two of the largest companies in Israel at that time. In 1958, Eidelberg became the General Manager of the Dead Sea Works until 1961, reporting to the Director General Mordechai Maklef (Hebrew: מרדכי מקלף), who was a retired Chief of staff of the IDF. From 1961 to 1964, he served as the General Manager of the Israel Shipyards. Between 1964 and 1968 he became the Branch Manager of Tahal, Iran, where he started exploring the mystery of the Ten Lost Tribes. He later became the manager of the Tahal branch in the Ivory Coast (1968-1972), where he explored the mystery of Exodus. From the mid-1960s until his death in 1985, Eidelberg continued exploring and writing books about The Exodus and the Ten Lost Tribes of Israel.^{[1]}

== Historian of Ancient Hebrew Mysteries ==
=== Exodus Through North African Desert ===
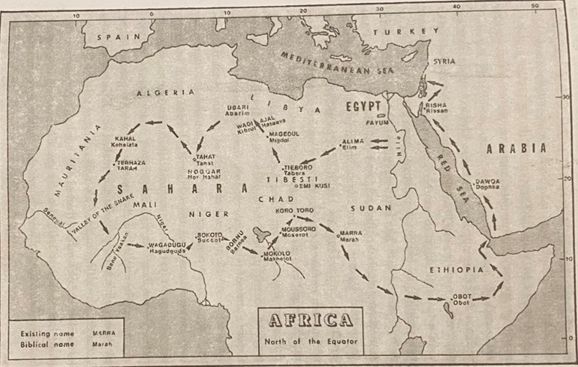
The original Exodus map by Eidelberg

In 1969, while working in the Ivory Coast, Eidelberg claimed to have found that a tribe in Mali, named Bambara, that, according to him, spoke ancient Hebrew and ate Manna daily. His research, which followed, was detailed in his Hebrew book, “Bambara, A new Approach for solving the puzzle of Exodus and the mystery of the Ten Lost Tribes of Israel” (Hebrew: במברה גישה חדשה לפענוח חידת יציאת מצרים ותעלומת עשרת השבטים). The first edition of Bambara was published by Eidelberg in 1972 with publishing house Hamatmid. The linguistics foundation of his theories was written in 1977 in a short print, "BAMBARA (A PROTO-HEBREW LANGUAGE?)". Forty-two years later, in 2014, a second edition was published with Gefen Publishing House. The book title of the second edition included In Footsteps towards the Pillar of Fire (Hebrew: בעקבות עמוד האש). The title change highlights one of Eidelberg's theories, that Mount Sinai is Emi Koussi, an active volcano in North Africa, which created a Pillar of Fire (Hebrew: עמוד האש). The Pillar of Fire, according to the Biblical story, led the Israelites, with its fire during the night and its smoke during daylight, to the place where Moses gave them the Ten Commandments from God. In 2021 the Hebrew book Bambara was translated to English and published by BookBaby under the title "BAMBARA Uncovering The Hidden Footsteps From the Pillar of Fire to the Rising Sun". Eidelberg's theories, as presented in Bambara, were referenced in work of Aria Nasi Research.

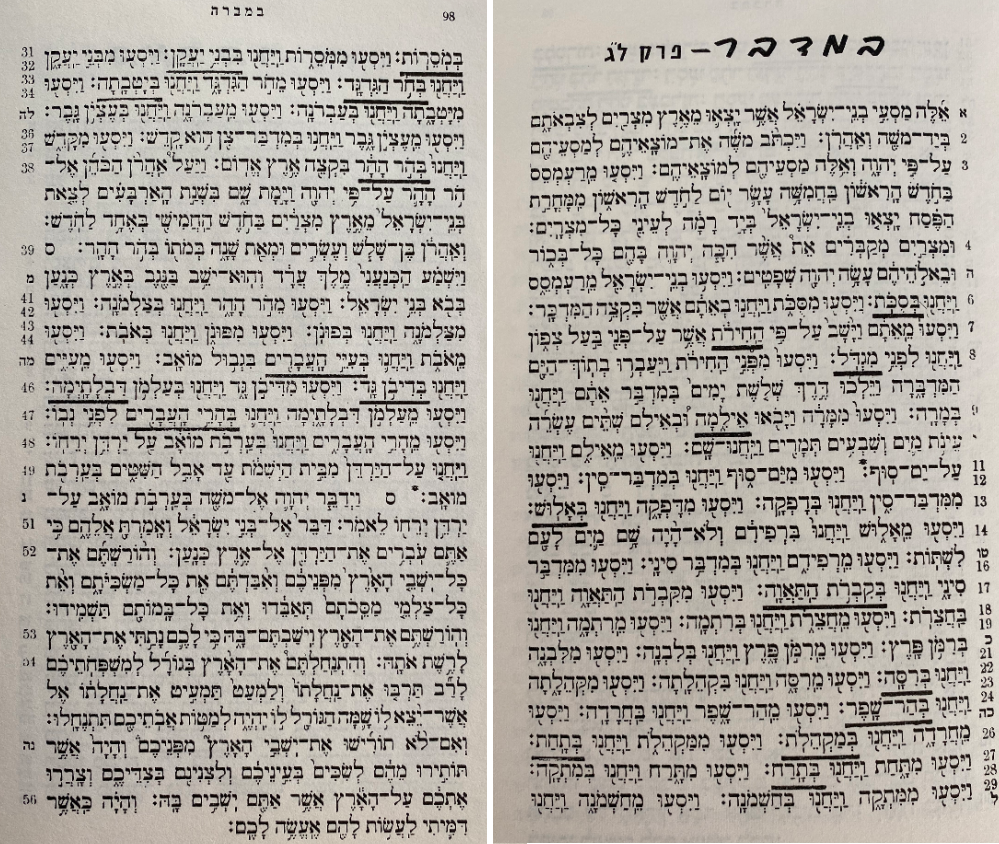
Sefer Bamidbar [ סֵפֶר בְּמִדְבַּר ], The Book of Numbers, Chapter 33 (פרק לייג) with 20 underlined location, along the Exodus route, which Eidelberg correlated to existing locations in North Africa

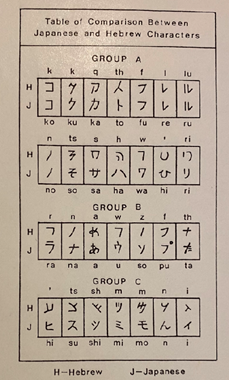
Comparison between Japanese and Hebrew letters

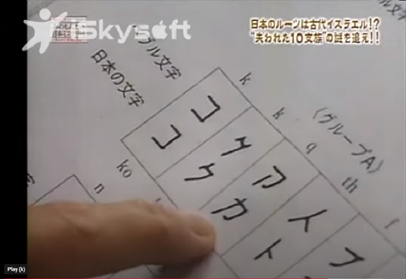
Eidelberg's theory shown in a Japanese TV Series, August 2011

=== The Japanese and the Ten Lost Tribes of Israel ===
In 1980, after spending a year in a Shinto Shrine, Eidelberg published his second history book “The Japanese and the Ten Lost Tribes of Israel”, by the publisher Zur-Ot. The book expanded his theory of the route, which the exiled Lost Tribes of Israel took from Samaria, though Asia and which ended up, according to his theory, in Japan. The theory also includes additional similarities in traditions, mythological stories, writings, and rituals, as well as hundreds of Japanese words and symbols whose genesis were narrated from ancient Hebrew. The book was translated into Japanese by Kazuo Nakagawa and sold at an estimated 40,000 copies. Its 2nd edition was published 24 years later, in 2014, by his son with Gefen Publishing House. A similar theory was presented in 2003 by Avigdor Shachan in chapter 14 of his Hebrew book, “Towards the Sambation: a Journey following the footsteps of the 10 Tribes” (Hebrew: אל עבר הסמבטיון מסע בעקבות עשרת השבטים) . Shachan's book was translated into English in 2007 with the title In the Footsteps of the Lost Ten Tribes. Both of these books by Shachan have considerable reference to Eidelberg's related discoveries as well as other educational organizations. Other academic institutes raised doubts about Eidelberg's findings saying that "some of his much too far fetched, or even crude, etymological comparisons arouse doubts rather than cause convicting”. A similar view is shown in the following academic publication. "In 1980, an Israeli researcher and writer, Joseph Eidelberg, published a book called The Japanese and the Ten Lost Tribes of Israel, in which he examined most of the Japanese publications on this subject and proposed the existence of a Japan-Jewish connection dating to the seventh century. In it, he claims that the word Yamato, the center of ancient Japan, is similar to Yehoamato—the people of God. He argues that the ancient Japanese began their journey in history in a year called Kinoye Tora, which he connected with the Hebrew words Kenei Torah (Torah reeds). The title “Agata Noshi,” awarded by a Japanese emperor to his nobles, was identified by Eidelberg as close to “Aguda Nassi,” or “Nessi Aguda” (meaning “chairman of the association”). All this sounds far-fetched and not plausible, although it is certainly interesting."

=== The Biblical Hebrew Origin of the Japanese People ===
Following the publication of his second book, Eidelberg deepened his research about the relationship between the Japanese and the ancient Hebrews, in his third book, “The Biblical Hebrew Origin of the Japanese People”. In this last book, he tabulated hundreds of words in Japanese with similar sounds and meanings to Hebrew. His research ended shortly before his death in 1985. After his death, the manuscript of the book was organized by his sister and published in 2005 by his son with Gefen Publishing House. The book was translated into Japanese by Arimasa Kubo in 2012. Eidelberg's theories were cited in book publications which followed, such as "Jesus From India to Japan"., and theological organizations such as "The Christian Bushido" His theory about the Ten Lost Tribes of Israel was also presented in a series of seven episodes by a Japanese TV broadcasting station , and in Japanese Youtube videos.

== Reaction ==
The mysteries about Exodus and the Ten Lost Tribes of Israel led to many theories about where it took place and where they ended up. It is therefore expected, that Joseph Eidelberg's theories about these mysteries, will create mixed reactions, where historians, writers and editors may support, doubt, dispute, question or combine it with other theories, as shown in the following examples.

=== Historians ===
- Doubt: "The author's thesis does need more investigation in order to substantiate a majority off his claim"
- Dispute: "The Japanese are not Hebrews!"
- Combine: "Eiji Kawamorita, a hebraic scholar took a view that was a combination of Kubo and Eidelberg"
- Support: "Paying thanks to the engineer, researcher, Joseph Eidelberg whose books "Bambara", and "The Japanese and the Ten Lost tribes of Israel", lightened my way for forty years until I wrote this book".

=== Articles and Editorials ===
- BOOK COMMENT - The Biblical Hebrew Origin of the Japanese People
- Words, words, Words
- Priests in Japan from the Ten tribes?
- The route of Exodus,- Today
- Researcher Eidelberg view of the Bambara Tribe in Mali

== Personal life ==
Joseph's father, Haim Eidelberg, an industrial construction entrepreneur in Haifa Bay, was a Russian soldier, who was wounded in World War I. He immigrated to Palestine with his wife Clara, son Joseph, and daughter Dina Harris who was for many years the secretary of Yad Hanadiv. His brother, Jonah Eidelberg, was born in Mandatory Palestine (now Israel) and became a naval academy cadet and a demolition officer in the IDF. During the 1947–1949 Palestine war (Hebrew: מלחמת העצמאות), he fought in Al-Nabi Yusha'. He later went to the US to study engineering, followed by an engineering management career. Eidelberg was married to Zipora Zitrin in 1943 and was separated in 1964. His son, Boaz Eidelberg, is a mechanical engineer and a university professor. His granddaughter Yael completed Law and Business schools. His grandson Tal Eidelberg is a Computer Science entrepreneur, founder, and CEO of a Healthcare scheduling company.
