= P. Y. Saeki =

Japanese scholar (1871–1965)

Yoshiro Saeki
- Born: September 15, 1871; Hatsukaichi, Hiroshima Prefecture, Empire of Japan
- Died: June 26, 1965 (aged 93)
- Other name: 佐伯 好郎
- Occupations: Language, religion

Yoshiro Saeki (Japanese: 佐伯好郎; September 15, 1871 – June 26, 1965) was a Japanese scholar of religion, law, and the English language. Peter Saeki is his Christian name. He is known for his theories about the Church of the East (at the time referred to as "Nestorianism") and Jewish culture in Japan and for his involvement in the planning of the new Hiroshima after the atomic bombing.

== Career ==
Saeki was a Japanese Anglican who became an expert on the influence of the Church of the East, which at one time existed in China. He entered Tōkyō Senmon Gakkō (later Waseda University) in 1890. That year, he was also baptized into the Anglican-Episcopal Church of Japan at St Paul's Church in Tsukiji, Tokyo, by Rev. Kumanzo Mikami. He was a close friend of Uchimura Kanzō, a Methodist evangelist, but their relationship turned sour later. He graduated in 1893, travelled to the United States, and then moved to Canada to study languages at the University of Toronto, graduating in 1895. He returned to Tōkyō to teach English at Tōkyō Sermon Gakkō and the Tokyo French School. He later taught at the Tokyo Higher Normal School, 独立女学校, the Fifth Higher School (Kumamoto), the Tokyo Institute of Technology, and from 1922, at Meiji University. He conducted research in China from 1930 to 1931, and from 1931 to 1940 he was a research associate at Tokyo Imperial University, and he received his doctoral degree from that institution in 1941.

== Scholarship ==
In 1904, he turned his research towards Chinese history. 1908 he published a book in which he theorised the Hata clan, which arrived from Korea and settled in Japan in the third century, was a Jewish-"Nestorian" tribe. Ben Ami-Shillony states, "Saiki's writings spread the theory about 'the common ancestry of the Japanese and the Jews' (Nichiyu Dōsoron) in Japan, a theory endorsed by some Christian groups." Versions of this Japanese-Jewish common ancestry theory were taken up by other writers at the time.

In 1916, Saeki published The Nestorian Monument in China, an analysis of the Xi'an Stele, a monument describing the Church of the East in China in 781. The book summarised the competing theories about the stele. He also published several other books and articles on Church of the East relics. His theories of religion were influenced by those of Max Müller.

== Hiroshima ==
After World War II, he was appointed mayor of Hatsukaichi in Hiroshima Prefecture. During that time, he consulted on the rebuilding of the city after the atomic bombing of August 6, 1945. He advised rebuilding the city as a relatively small and well-planned space.

In 1962 he received an honorary doctorate from Waseda University.

== Bibliography ==
A partial bibliography of his works as listed in the Library of Congress would include:

- Keikyo hibun kenkyu. The Nestorian monument in China, (Place: Publisher, era 44 [1911]).
- The Nestorian Monument in China, (London: SPCK, 1916, reprinted 1928).
- The luminous religion, a study of Nestorian Christianity in China, with a translation of the inscription upon the Nestorian tablet, with Mrs. C. E. Couling, (London: Carey press, 1925).
- Roma ho koyo, 1927.
- Keikyo no kenkyu, (Tokyo: Toho Bunka Gakuin Tokyo Kenkyujo—Hatsubaijo Bunkyudo Shoten, Showa 10 [1935]; reprinted Tokyo: Meicho Fukyukai, Showa 53 [1978 & 1980].
- Articles in the Journal of the North China Branch of the Royal Asiatic Society from 1932 to 1936.
- Shina Kirisutokyo no kenkyu, (Place: Publisher, Showa 18-24 [1943-49]) 4 vols.
- Nestorian Documents and Relics in China, (Tokyo: Toho bunkwa gakuin: The Academy of oriental culture, 1937; 2nd edition, Tokyo: Maruzen, 1951). An English language abridgement of Keikyo no kenkyu.
- Catalogue of the Nestorian literature and relics, (Tokyo: Maruzen,1950).
- Chūgoku ni okeru Keikyo suibo no rekishi, (Kyoto: Habado Enkei Doshisha Toho Bunka Koza Iinkai, Showa 30 [1955]).
- Roma-teikoku Kirisutokyo hogo kitei no kenkyu. (Place: Publisher, 1957).
- Saeki Yoshiro iko narabini den, (Place: Publisher, Showa 45 [1970]).
