= Sein =

Sein can refer to:

== Places ==
- Île-de-Sein, an island and commune in Brittany, France
- Raz de Sein, a stretch of water in Brittany, France

== People ==
Given name

- Sein Aye, birthname of Sitt Nyein Aye (born 1956), Burmese artist
- Sein Hlaing (1918-2010), Burmese footballer and coach
- Sein Lwin (1923-2004), Burmese politician, 6th President of the Union of Burma
- Po Sein (1882-1954), Burmese actor, singer and dancer
- U Sein Than, Burmese land reform activist
- Thein Sein (born 1945), Burmese politician and military commander, 8th President of Myanmar

Surname

- Mai Šein (born 1946), Estonian architect

== Fictional characters ==
- Sein, character in Magical Girl Lyrical Nanoha Strikers

== Other ==
- SEIN: Société d'encouragement pour l'industrie nationale, organization established in 1801 to encourage French industry
