= Seno =

Seno, Séno or Senó may refer to:

== Places ==
- Seno, Aragon, a town in Spain
- Seno, Laos
- Séno Province, Burkina Faso
- Seno Skyring, an inland sound in Chile
- Seno Station, Hiroshima, Japan

== People with the surname ==
- Frank Seno (1921–1974), American football player
- Andrea Seno (born 1966), Italian former footballer
- Yuki Seno (born 1996), Japanese professional footballer

== Fictional characters ==
- Alice Seno/Seno Arisu and Mayura Seno, from the Japanese manga Alice 19th
- Aiko Seno, a.k.a. Mirabelle Haywood, a character from the anime series Ojamajo Doremi
  - Koji Seno, her father
  - Atsuko Seno (née Okamura), a.k.a. Miriam Haywood, her mother

Natsuru Senō, an protagonist from manga Kämpfer

== See also ==
- Sein (disambiguation)
- Senoi, an indigenous people of Malaysia
