= Nissen dōsoron =

Controversial theory of common Japanese and Korean ancestry

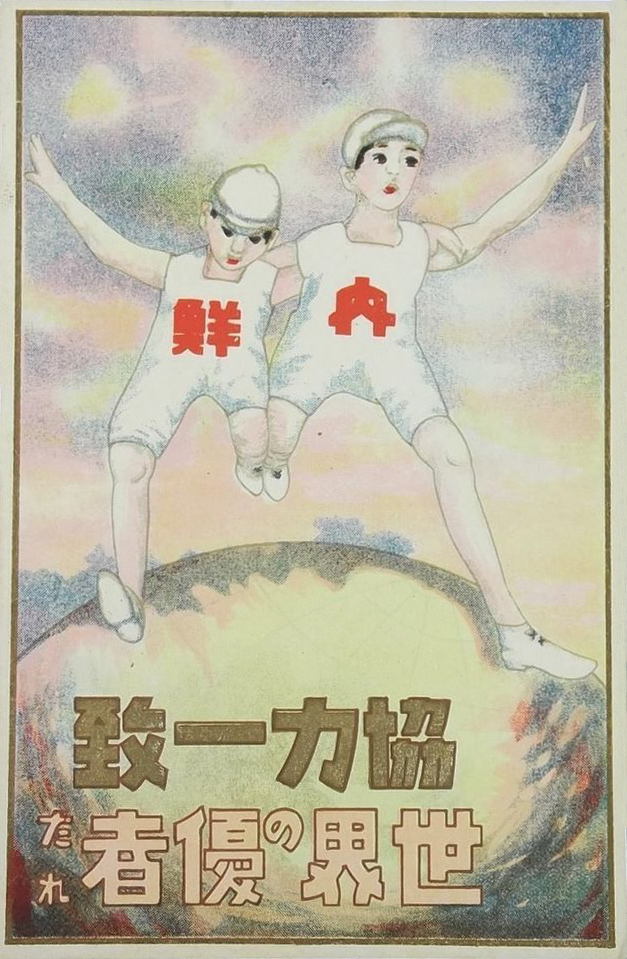
- Japanese propangada poster from the 1920's promoting a Japanese (內/right) and Korean (鮮/left) unity.

Korean name
- Hangul: 일선동조론
- Hanja: 日鮮同祖論
Transcriptions
- Revised Romanization: Ilseon dongjoron

Alternative Korean name
- Hangul: 일한동조론
- Hanja: 日韓同祖論
Transcriptions
- Revised Romanization: Ilhan dongjoron

Japanese name
- Kanji: 日鮮同祖論
- Kana: にっせんどうそろん
Transcriptions
- Romanization: Nissen dōsoron

Alternative Japanese name
- Kanji: 日朝同祖論
- Kana: にっちょうどうそろん
Transcriptions
- Romanization: Nitchō dōsoron

Alternative Japanese name
- Kanji: 日韓同祖論
- Kana: にっかんどうそろん
Transcriptions
- Romanization: Nikkan dōsoron

Nissen dōsoron (Japanese: 日鮮同祖論; lit. 'Theory on Japanese‑Korean Common Ancestry') is a theory claiming that the Japanese people and the Korean people share a common ancestry. It was first introduced during the Japanese annexation of Korea in the early 20th century by Japanese historians from Tokyo Imperial University after adopting pre-existing theories conceived during the Meiji era. It mainly cites the Nihon Shoki, Kojiki, and Shinsen Shōjiroku to emphasize that the Japanese people descended from the Japanese deity Amaterasu and the Korean people from Susanoo, her younger brother.

== Overview ==
The precursor to the theory was first conceived by three Japanese – historians Shigeno Yasutsugu, Kume Kunitake, and Hoshino Hisashi – with the publication of Kōhon kokushi gan (稿本国史眼) prior to the annexation.

The book asserted that the legendary figures Susanoo, the brother of Emperor Jimmu, Inahi no Mikoto and Empress Jingū had ruled or invaded ancient Silla (Korea). This was due to the fact that the aforementioned individuals were related to Silla in one way or another: Susanoo first arriving in Silla (Nihon Shoki), Inahi no Mikoto being an ancestor to a king of Silla (Shinsen Shōjiroku) and Empress Jingū descending from Amenohiboko, a prince of Silla (Kojiki). In other instances, Hogong, a Japanese individual who helped King Hyeokgeose build Silla, is used to extend the narrative. The Japanese scholars' focus on Silla was mostly due to it being the kingdom that unified the peninsula and being the foundation for future Korean kingdoms that soon followed. This meant that claiming Japanese origins of Silla created a basis for a Japanese foothold in the formation of a unified Korea, further expanding its legitimacy of reclaiming the land. These views of Korea's historical subjugation to Japan became widely accepted in Japanese scholarship and integral to Japan's national history, as it was presented in other books of Japan's Meiji era (1868–1912), such as Ōtori Keisuke's Chōsen kibun (朝鮮紀聞) (1885), and Hayashi Taisuke (林泰輔)'s Chōsenshi (朝鮮史) (1892) which made similar arguments.

Japanese history revisionists used the story of Susanoo in particular to link the deities of Japan to the deities of Korea in order to create a sense of justification over the annexation. One claim was that the Korean god and the founder of the first Korean kingdom Old Chosŏn, Tan'gun, was in fact the Japanese god, Susanoo. This claim was based on the fact that Susanoo first emerged from the lands of Silla, a Korean kingdom during the Three Kingdoms period of Korea in a place called "Soshimori (曽尸茂梨)" but soon left the Korean Peninsula for the Japanese archipelago as he was dissatisfied with the place, according to both Nihon Shoki and Kojiki. Using this, Japanese historians claimed that Susanoo was the original Tan'gun who the Koreans descended from.

However, the claim was met with criticism from Korean historians as Tan'gun's alleged first founding of Old Chosŏn (2333(?)–108 BCE) was over two millennia prior to Susanoo's emergence from Silla (57 BCE–935 CE). To counter this, historians such as Shiratori Kurakichi, founder of the discipline of Oriental History (Tōyōshi/東洋史) in Tokyo Imperial University, argued that the Korean deity was fabricated by Buddhist priests sometime after 372 CE. This allowed him to demonstrate "that Korea as a unified country developed relatively late in the history of Asia, and later than Japan", ultimately discrediting Tan'gun's supposed accomplishments in favor of the Japanese god. By the beginning of the rule, most Japanese historians denied Tan'gun's existence as a separate deity. Elder Shinto priest Tsunoda Tadayuki postulated that Susanoo was in fact analogous with Tan'gun (Note: Tsunoda identified Dangun with Susano-o-no-mikoto 素戔嗚尊 (a younger brother of Amaterasu in Japanese myths) in light of the supposed mythological relations between Korea and Japan in antiquity. This was also a compromise between the Hirata school's ethnocentric Shinto ideal—"Japan as the origin of the world"—and the latest theory concerning "the identical origins of Japanese and Koreans" advocated by some historians and anthropologists. Further, Tsunoda's interest in Dangun coincided with the emergence of a Korean nationalism focused on this deity. Thus the Shintoists' petition reverberated beyond their original intent; when the Japanese government faced the March First Independent Movement of 1919 in Korea, Tsunoda's opinion concerning Dangun was quoted by a group of liberal Diet members to accuse the colonial government of misrule. Then, around the time of the inauguration ceremony of the Chōsen Shrine on 15 October 1925, several Shinto activists, including leading figures in the priesthood, petitioned the Governor-General to enshrine Dangun in it. — Suga Kōji, A Concept of "Overseas Shinto Shrines" - A Pantheistic Attempt by Ogasawara Shōzō and Its Limitations) and advocated the amalgamation of the Japanese kami with the Korean god. A similar phenomenon happened prior with Susanoo and Gozu Tennō, another foreign god that may have Korean origin.

After discrediting Tan'gun as an autonomous and native god of the Korean people, Japanese officials such as Koiso Kuniaki (小磯國昭), Governor General of Korea, began to teach the youth that "the Japanese could trace their lineage to Amaterasu, whereas the Koreans descended from Susanoo, who had appeared on Mount Soshimori in Korea."

== History ==
=== Pre-Meiji Period ===
The outlines of the theory can be traced back to mid-Edo period Kokugaku scholarship. Hirata Atsutane was among those who used their studies of Kojiki and Nihon Shoki to claim that Korean and Japanese history was intertwined from the period of ancient nation formation and that a hierarchical relationship in which Japan was dominant could be established. The view is currently unsupported. Arai Hakuseki claimed that Japanese ancestors came from the Mahan confederacy, and that there was a possibility that Kumaso was Goguryeo.

=== Post-Meiji Period ===
The Meiji period historians Hoshino Hisashi, Kita Sadakichi, and linguist Kanazawa Shosaburo have been criticized for promulgating theories of common ancestry used to justify Korea's annexation and policy of cultural assimilation.

== Influence ==
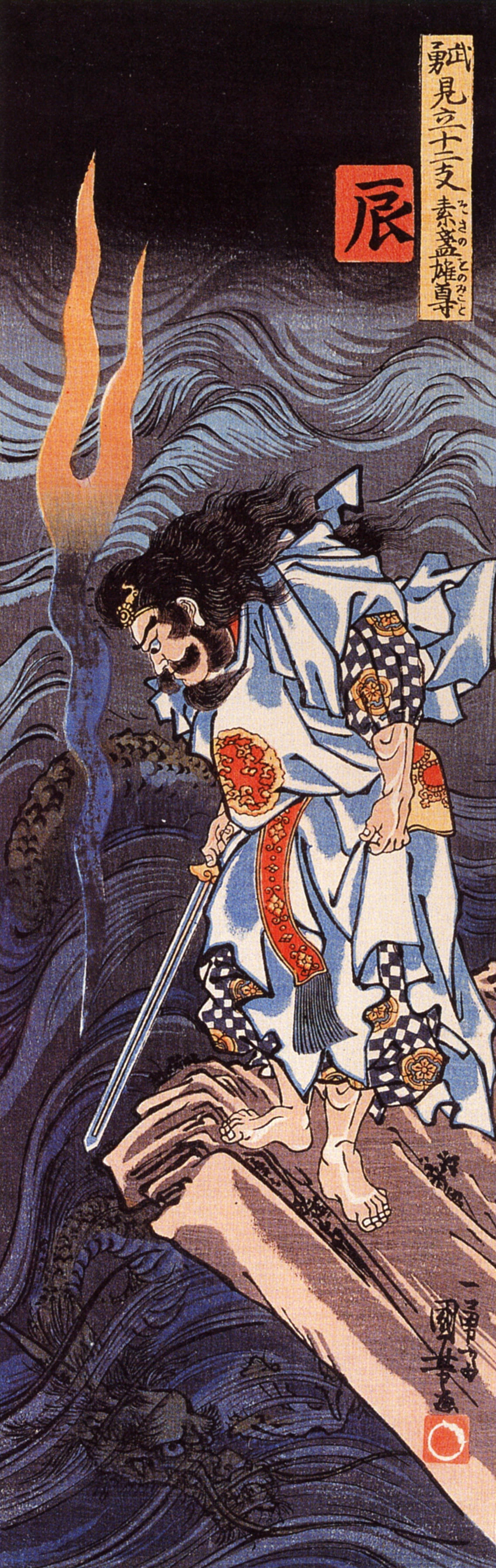
Susanoo-no-Mikoto

The theory gained further momentum among historians with much emphasis put on the natures of both the Japanese and the Koreans by comparing the two ethnic groups to Amaterasu and Susanoo as siblings with shared heritage but vastly different personalities.

While embodying the collective identity of the Japanese, Amaterasu was depicted as a god of serenity and patience while Susanoo was depicted as an unruly younger brother who depended on his benevolent elder sister's leadership. In addition, as early as the medieval period, Susanoo was regarded as a "foreign" deity who had come to the Japanese archipelago from the Asian mainland and was only re-evaluated by Japanese historians when the annexation of Korea commenced. Susanoo's impulsive behavior and his mediocrity was supposedly inherited by that of the Koreans (the descendants of Susanoo) and thus was treated as a task for the Japanese (the descendants of Amaterasu) to redeem the Koreans from political turmoil and cultural barbarism as their "elder sibling".

The contrast between Susanoo's lack of self-control and Amaterasu's serenity was used as a model for the relationship of the two "sibling" nations: in colonial discourse, the alleged immaturity of the Korean people and their state was often contrasted with Japan's successful modernization, which in turn legitimated Japanese colonial rule. Japanese physical anthropologists themselves played a significant role in the "expansion and management" of colonial Korea.

There was also an ancient view that Ōkuninushi was a foreign deity from the Korean peninsula, which was also later used as justification for Nissen dōsoron, although there is no evidence for this beyond the Kojiki and Nihon Shoki listing him as a descendant of Susanoo.

== Reception ==
The majority of the Koreans were against the idea that the two ethnic groups derived from a common ancestry as much of the claims made by the nationalistic historians of Japan not only contradicted their own beliefs, but in turn also denied Koreans their own worshipped deity its autonomy. They insisted that "Koreans are without a doubt a unitary nation (tanil han minjok) in blood and culture." Following the 1938 introduction of a volunteer draft system for Koreans, during the Second Sino-Japanese War, the majority of Koreans who volunteered did so either out of coercion, such as threats to dispossess the business licenses of their alien parents, or out of hopes to escape political discrimination and obtain the right to vote and move freely by way of Japanese citizenship.

In contrast to its lukewarm reception in Korea, the theory of common ancestry enjoyed broad popular appeal in mainland Japan. The theory of common ancestry offered an enlarged version of the homogeneous nation theory that was applied to the entirety of the Empire of Japan. Interestingly, in contrast to pan-Asianism, the theory "only included Korea in the Japanese ethnic community, not the other colonies" (such as Manchuria or Taiwan) as Korea was indeed a country that had been in close contact with Japan throughout most of its history and thus must have created a close sense of affinity amongst the Japanese. Nissen dōsoron was the "main pillar" supporting the related concept Naisen ittai (内鮮一体), or unity of the inland (内) with Korea, which was represented with the character 鮮 (sen), derived from the name Chōsen. The character for inland was used in place of the more common abbreviated prefix for Japan, ni (日), because Korea was interpreted as already being a part of Japan.

== Aftermath ==
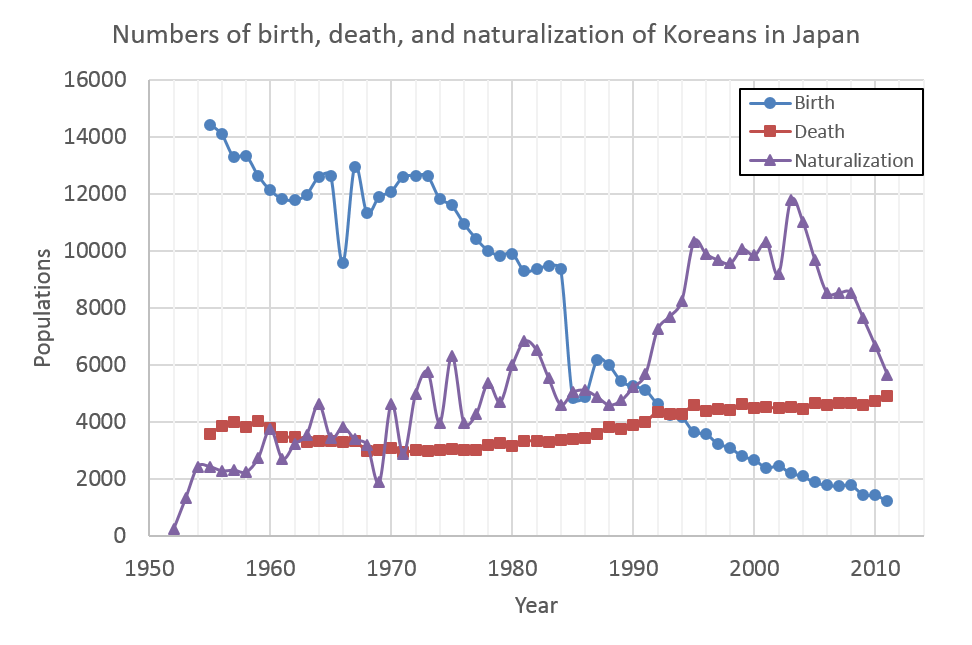
Numbers of birth, death, and naturalization of Koreans in Japan

Due to overwhelming support of the theory, the Empire of Japan brought large influx of Koreans into the Japanese diaspora where their descendents remained in the islands as ethnic Koreans in Japan or Zainichi Koreans (在日韓国人・在日本朝鮮人). However, due to assimilation of the ethnic group and fewer people identifying themselves as Korean, the number of Zainichi Koreans have been slowly but steadily declining since the late 20th century, currently being the second largest ethnic minority group in Japan after Chinese immigrants.

With the rapid development of modern Japan after World War II and the growing threat of North Korea, so did its nationalism which made the reputation of the Zainichi Koreans become less favorable among the Japanese as many had favorable connections with North Korea and Chongryon. This forced the ethnic Koreans to become a target of hostility and animosity which in turn made Nissen dōsoron now a blasphemous theory and an obsolete piece of history for the Japanese.

== Scientific consensus ==
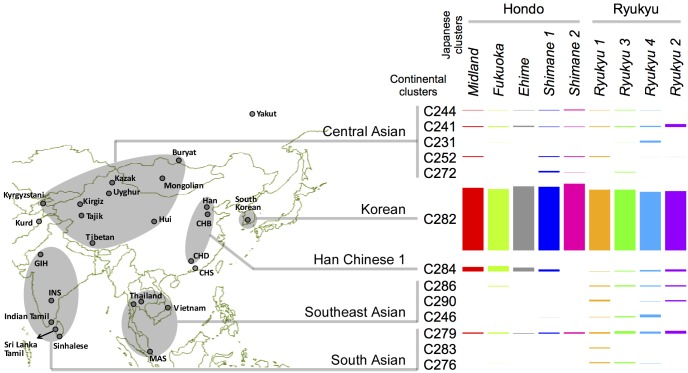
Ancestry profile of Japanese genetic clusters illustrating their genetic similarities to four mainland Asian populations

While the Japanese and Korean people certainly are expected to share a considerable degree of genetic affinity by virtue of historical and geographic proximity, modern population genetics has provided a means to quantitatively measure the extent to which such an affinity is present.

In essence, the majority of Japanese genetic ancestry is derived from sources related to other mainland Asian groups, mostly Koreans, while the other amount is derived from the local Jōmon hunter-gatherers. In recent haplotype-based studies, the Japanese cluster was found to share 87–94% of its genetic components with the Korean cluster, while the rest consisted of Jōmon related ancestry.

Evidence for both Northern and Southern mtDNA and Y-DNA haplogroups has been observed in the Japanese, with the North-Eastern DNA taking up majority of the genetic makeup, especially among the Mainland group. In addition to the Northeastern ancestry, the Japanese demographics (alongside the Koreans) are the only ethnicities to have restricted presence of the Jōmon-like M7a DNA in East Asia.

== Historical accuracy ==
Though being a controversial theory for both nations, contemporary historians have pointed to certain historical accounts that could suggest a close relationship between the Japanese Imperial family and the Korean peninsula.

First, the claims made by Empress Jingū and her conquest to invade Korea as part of her quest to obtain the "promised land" are linked to the empress's own background of being of Korean descent. Her distant ancestor, Amenohiboko, is believed to be a prince from Silla who left Korea to settle in Japan. Some theorize that Jingū was fixated on Korea due to her ancestor coming from the peninsula and deemed it her mission to reclaim it for herself. Regardless of the historical accuracy surrounding her expedition and her triumphant return, the consensus is that this was the first instance when Korean influence was first seen in the Japanese imperial line. In fact, linguist and Japanese language expert Alexander Vovin states that due to Amenohiboko being of Korean origin, Jingū and her son and successor, Emperor Ōjin, might have been native speakers of the Korean language.

Another example of Korean influence is shown when Emperor Kanmu (or Kammu) ascended to the throne. His mother, Takano no Niigasa, who was of Korean descent, was deemed unfavorable for being a royal consort to Emperor Kōnin and for being an individual of foreign origin, which indirectly affected Emperor Kanmu in a negative way. To circumvent this, Kammu emphasized multiple times the importance of Korean culture to Japan. Sources such as the Jinnō Shōtōki by Kitabatake Chikafusa states that a record that claimed Japan's origin with Korea was lost during Kammu's time, which indicates that such intentions were highly regarded during Emperor Kanmu's reign up until the book's disappearance.

『昔「日本は三韓と同種也」と云事のありし、かの書をば、桓武の御代にやきすてられしなり。』

"Originally, it was recorded that 'Japan and the Three Kingdoms of Korea are the same' but the book was lost during Emperor Kanmu's reign."

— Kitabatake Chikafusa, Jinnō Shōtōki

Kammu's newly found lineage marked the start of the Heian period, with his Korean ancestry being passed down to his descendants which ultimately spread to multiple clans and members during the Sengoku period, with numerous clans being able to trace their lineage back to Korea.

The stretch of Korean influence was officially recognized in 2001 when Emperor Akihito told reporters "I, on my part, feel a certain kinship with Korea, given that it is recorded in the Chronicles of Japan that the mother of Emperor Kanmu was one of the descendants of King Muryeong of Baekje." It was the first time that a Japanese emperor publicly acknowledged Korean blood in the imperial line.

Though Nissen dōsoron is not a socially acceptable notion, historians state that there is no denial in the connections between Japan and Korea.

== See also ==
- Toraijin: Immigrants that arrived in Japan predominantly from Korea and people who are thought to have heavily impacted both demographics' genealogy.
- Nichiryū dōsoron (in Japanese): Theory claiming the Japanese people and the neighboring Ryukyuan people share a common ancestry.
- Nichiyu dōsoron: Theory that claiming the Japanese people and the Jewish people share a common ancestry.
