= Shōei Mishina =

Japanese historian (1902–1971)

Shohei Mishina (三品彰英, Mishina Shōhei; 5 July 1902 – 19 December 1971) was a Japanese historian and mythologist specializing in the history of Korea and Japan. In 1928, Mishina graduated from the Faculty of History of Literature at Kyoto University. Before World War II he was a professor at Kyoto University and the Imperial Japanese Navy. In 1945, he retired as a professor from the Imperial Navy and began teaching at Ōtani University, where he was appointed professor in 1946. Later he was a professor at Dōshisha University between 1955 and 1960, and after that, he was director of the Osaka City Museum and professor at Bukkyo University.

Mishina was a teacher of the historian Hideo Inoue, and since 1960, he maintained in Kansai a Study Group composed of several researchers, about ancient Japanese history.
