= Kawakatsu clan =

Kawakatsu 川勝
- Parent house: Hata clan
- Titles: Hatamoto others

Kawakatsu clan (川勝氏, Kawakatsu-shi) was a Japanese clan that claimed descent from the Hata clan. In the Edo period, several of the clan's branches were Hatamoto families.
