= Nicholas McLeod =

British pseudohistorian

Nicholas McLeod (fl. 1868–1889), in some accounts called Norman McLeod, was a native of the Isle of Skye, Scotland known for his theory that the Japanese people descended from the Lost Tribes of Israel.

Tudor Parfitt describes McLeod as

...a Scot who started his career in the herring industry before he ended up in Japan as a missionary...

Beyond that is very little known for certain about him except that he published a book in 1878 in Nagasaki called Epitome of the ancient history of Japan (cover title: Japan and the Lost Tribes of Israel) and another in Kyoto under the title Illustrations to the Epitome of the ancient history of Japan, including illustrations to the guide book.

The thesis of these extraordinary books was that the holy class of Japan is descended from the Lost Tribes of Israel. He claimed that the first known king of Japan was called Osee and came to the throne in 730 B.C., identifying him with Hoshea, the last king of Israel, who died in 722 B.C. The books contain extensive comparisons of the religious rituals of Judaism and Shinto as evidence of the links between ancient Israel and Japan.

McLeod dedicated the book Epitome of the ancient history of Japan published in 1878 to "Rve. William Mackenzie (Late of North Leith Free Church, Scotland)". According to Zvi Ben-Dor Benite, MacLeod had been a missionary who spent decades in Japan and Korea "searching for the true Israelites". The following passage is an example from the book in which McLeod draws correlations between his observations on Japan and the fulfillment of biblical prophecy.

The civilized race of the Aa. Inus, the Tokugawa and the Machi No Hito of the large towns, by dwelling in the tent or tabernacle shaped houses first erected by Jin Mu Tenno, have fulfilled Noah's prophecy regarding Japhet, "He shall dwell in the tents of Shem."(McLeod, 1878. p. 7)

== See also ==
- Japanese-Jewish Common Ancestor Theory
- British Israelism
- Ten Lost Tribes

== Sources ==
Jozef Rogala, A Collector's Guide to Books on Japan in English, Routledge, ISBN 1-873410-91-3
