= U Sein Than =

Burmese land reform activist

U Sein Than is a Burmese land reform activist who was imprisoned for his role in protests in Michaungkan village, Thingangyun Township, Yangon Region.

In the 1990s, the Tatmadaw (Burmese armed forces) seized hundreds of thousands of acres of farmland in the region. U Sein Than led a protest against these seizures in November 2013, and a sit-in in Yangon's Maha Bandula Park in March 2014. In April 2014, he organized a protest outside the home of opposition leader Aung San Suu Kyi, calling on her to intervene in the dispute.

U Sein Than has been arrested several times for his role in the Michaungkan protests. He was sentenced to three months' imprisonment on 26 November 2013 for protesting without permission, and given an additional sentence of six months on 9 December 2013 on a second charge. He was then released by presidential amnesty on 13 December 2013.

On 19 August 2014, he was sentenced to four months of penal labour for protesting without permission; a day later, he was sentenced to an additional four months' imprisonment, extending his sentence to a total of eight months. Amnesty International designated U Sein Than a prisoner of conscience and called for his immediate and unconditional release.

U Sein Than has a wife, Daw Saw Sandar, and a daughter, Nay Nwe.
