= Hoshino Hisashi =

Japanese historian and sinologist

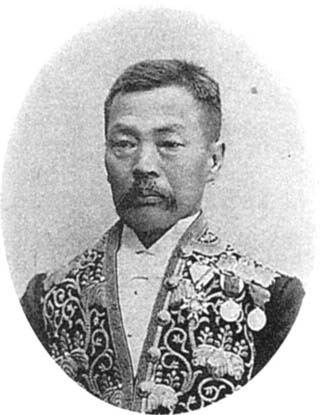
Portrait of Hoshino

Hoshino Hisashi (星野 恒, 1839–1917) was a Japanese historian and sinologist, active in the late 19th century debates over the role of Japanese history.

== Career ==
Hoshino was appointed professor at Tokyo Imperial University in 1888. Historical work had previously been carried out in a government department dedicated to writing the official history of Japan, but it was decided in 1888 to move this work to the university. Hoshino, Kume Kunitake, and Shigeno Yasutsugu were the first three history professors appointed. Hoshino and Kume took opposite views on the historical treatment of Japanese mythology: Hoshino held that the Age of the Gods was a historical age, in which actual historical events took place and had been recorded, whereas Kume argued the founding myths were allegorical, and promoted a more skeptical, scientific approach to history. Hoshino, Kume, and Shigeno nonetheless all shared a general belief in taking a more scholarly, scientific approach to history, and Hoshino joined the others in criticizing the emphasis on heroic myths in Japanese history. After Kume attacked state Shinto in an 1892 article deemed offensive by the imperial government, Kume was expelled from the university, and the Department of Japanese History was closed. The latter may have also been due in part to the government's decreased interest in the project of writing a grand history of Japan, especially one written in kanbun.

The government recreated a history institute at Tokyo Imperial University in 1895, and brought Hoshino back as its first head. This new department, which would become the Historiographical Institute, had a narrower mission devoted to compiling historical documents, and no longer included the project of writing an overall history of Japan. Hoshino disapproved of the reduction in scope, since he remained one of the few supporters of a grand history in kanbun. He nonetheless served as the Institute's first head, from 1895 to 1899.
