= Japanese clans =

This is a list of Japanese clans. The old clans (gōzoku) mentioned in the Nihon Shoki and Kojiki lost their political power before the Heian period, during which new aristocracies and families, kuge, emerged in their place. After the Heian period, the samurai warrior clans gradually increased in importance and power until they came to dominate the country after the founding of the first shogunate.

Japan traditionally practiced cognatic primogeniture, or male-line inheritance in regard to passing down titles and estates. By allowing adult adoption, or for men to take their wife's name and be adopted into her family served as a means to pass down an estate to a family without any sons, Japan has managed to retain continuous family leadership for many of the below clans, the imperial family, and even ordinary family businesses.

The ability for Japanese families to track their lineage over successive generations plays a far more important role than simply having the same name as another family, as many commoners did not use a family name prior to the Meiji Restoration, and many simply adopted (名字, myōji) the name of the lord of their village, or the name of their domain, and may not necessarily have been a retainer to the clan. Other clan names are based on common geographic features or other arbitrary words that didn't necessarily indicate clan membership.

Map showing the territories of major daimyō families around 1570

Many families also adopted sons from other families or married their daughters into other families to cement ties with a larger kin group outside of those with the same name as the main family line, called keibatsu (閨閥, lit. bedroom clique), a clan or family relationship built around both blood and maternal relations. Tokugawa Ieyasu himself had adopted two dozen children of allies in addition to his 16 acknowledged children.

The Meiji Restoration sought to dismantle the clan structure, giving clan leaders titles of nobility to inspire loyalty to the emperor rather than individual clans. However those familial relationships built over multiple generations still maintained their ties, first as monbatsu, then with industrialization, evolved into the pre-war zaibatsu, which were formed by these same inter-clan relationships. With the abolishment of the kazoku in 1947, they reverted to their unofficial keibatsu, and elements of which can be seen today in political families such as the Satō–Kishi–Abe family, with family ties to Marquess Inoue Kaoru, Viscount Ōshima Yoshimasa, and pre-war Foreign Minister Yōsuke Matsuoka, all descendants of lower ranking Chōshū samurai families who benefited from the clan's outsized influence in the Meiji era government, and effectively created their own new clan, despite the lack of official title.

== Ancient clan names ==
There are ancient-era clan names called Uji-na (氏名) or Honsei (本姓).

=== Imperial House ===
Mon of the Imperial House of Japan

- Imperial House of Japan – descended from Amaterasu. Its emperors and clan members have no clan name but had been called "the imperial house" (皇室) if necessary.

=== Four noble clans ===
Gempeitōkitsu (源平藤橘), 4 noble clans of Japan:

Mon of the Minamoto clan

- Minamoto clan (源氏) – also known as Genji (源氏) or Genke (源家); 21 cadet branches of the Imperial House of Japan.
  - Daigo Genji (醍醐源氏) – descended from 60th emperor Daigo.
  - Go-Daigo Genji (後醍醐源氏) – descended from 96th emperor Go-Daigo.
  - Go-Fukakusa Genji (後深草源氏) – descended from 89th emperor Go-Fukakusa.
  - Go-Nijō Genji (後二条源氏) – descended from 94th emperor Go-Nijō.
  - Go-Saga Genji (後嵯峨源氏) – descended from 88th emperor Go-Saga.
  - Go-Sanjō Genji (後三条源氏) – descended from 71st emperor Go-Sanjō.
  - Go-Shirakawa Genji (後白河源氏) – descended from 77th emperor Go-Shirakawa.
  - Juntoku Genji (順徳源氏) – descended from 84th emperor Juntoku.
  - Kameyama Genji (亀山源氏) – descended from 90th emperor Kameyama.
  - Kazan Genji (花山源氏) – descended from 65th emperor Kazan.
  - Kōkō Genji (光孝源氏) – descended from 58th emperor Kōkō.
  - Montoku Genji (文徳源氏) – descended from 55th emperor Montoku.
  - Murakami Genji (村上源氏) – descended from 62nd emperor Murakami.
  - Ninmyō Genji (仁明源氏) – descended from 54th emperor Ninmyō.
  - Ōgimachi Genji (正親町源氏) – descended from 106th emperor Ōgimachi.
  - Reizei Genji (冷泉源氏) – descended from 63rd emperor Reizei.
  - Saga Genji (嵯峨源氏) – descended from 52nd emperor Saga.
  - Sanjō Genji (三条源氏) – descended from 67th emperor Sanjō.
  - Seiwa Genji (清和源氏) – descended from 56th emperor Seiwa; origin of many samurai clans.
    - Kawachi Genji (河内源氏) – descended from Minamoto no Yorinobu; origin of Hitachi Genji (常陸源氏), Ishikawa Genji (石川源氏); and Kai Genji (甲斐源氏); famous for 3 Kamakura shōguns.
    - Settsu Genji (摂津源氏) – descended from Minamoto no Yorimitsu; origin of Tada Genji (多田源氏), Mino Genji (美濃源氏) and Shinano Genji (信濃源氏).
    - Yamato Genji (大和源氏) – descended from Minamoto no Yorichika.
  - Uda Genji (宇多源氏) – descended from 59th emperor Uda; origin of Ōmi Genji (近江源氏).
  - Yōzei Genji (陽成源氏) – descended from 57th emperor Yōzei.

Mon of the Taira clan

- Taira clan (平氏) – also known as Heishi (平氏) or Heike (平家); 4 cadet branches of Imperial House of Japan.
  - Kanmu Heishi (桓武平氏) – descended from 50th emperor Kanmu; famous for Taira no Masakado.
    - Bandōhachi Heishi (坂東八平氏) – descended from Taira no Yoshifumi.
    - Ise Heishi (伊勢平氏) – descended from Taira no Korehira; famous for Taira no Kiyomori.
  - Kōkō Heishi (光孝平氏) – descended from 58th emperor Kōkō.
  - Montoku Heishi (文徳平氏) – descended from 55th emperor Montoku.
  - Ninmyō Heishi (仁明平氏) – descended from 54th emperor Ninmyō.

Mon of the Fujiwara clan

- Fujiwara clan (藤原氏) – descended from Fujiwara no Kamatari, and through him, Ame-no-Koyane.
  - 4 families of Fujiwara (藤原四家) – descended from 4 sons of Fujiwara no Fuhito.
    - Fujiwara Hokke (藤原北家) – northern family; descended from Fujiwara no Fusasaki.
    - Fujiwara Kyōke (藤原京家) – descended from Fujiwara no Maro.
    - Fujiwara Nanke (藤原南家) – southern family; descended from Fujiwara no Muchimaro.
    - Fujiwara Shikike (藤原式家) – descended from Fujiwara no Umakai.
  - Northern Fujiwara clan (奥州藤原氏) – also known as Ōshū Fujiwara clan; descended from Fujiwara no Hidesato.

Mon of the Tachibana clan

- Tachibana clan (橘氏) – descended from Prince Naniwa-Ō, son of Prince Shōtoku (572–621), 2nd son of Emperor Yōmei; no direct relation to the feudal Tachibana clan (立花氏)

== Noble clans ==
- Abe clan (阿部氏/安倍氏) – descended from Prince Ōhiko, son of Emperor Kōgen. The Tsuchimikado family, descendants of Abe no Seimei, assumed leadership of this line during the Sengoku period. It is disputed whether the Ōshū clan is related.
- Abe clan of Ōshū (安倍氏) – descended from Abe no Yoritoki, were considered a separate clan from the above during the Edo era. It is now believed they are distant relatives. Shinzo Abe has claimed descent from this line.
- Aya clan of Sanuki province – Descended from Prince Takekaiko, grandson of Emperor Keikō, according to the Kojiki.
- Hashiji clan (土師氏) – descended from the kami Nomi no Sukune (legendary).
- Imube clan (忌部氏) – descended from the kami Ame no Futotama no Mikoto (legendary), and his descendant Ame no Tomi no Mikoto companion in arms of Emperor Jimmu.
- Ki clan (紀氏) – descended from Emperor Kōgen by the Minister Takenouchi no Sukune; famous for Ki no Tsurayuki.
- Kusakabe clan (日下部氏) – descended from 9th Emperor Kaika, or 36th Emperor Kōtoku (disputed).
- Mononobe clan (物部氏) – descended from the kami Nigihayahi no Mikoto (legendary), a descendant of the elder brother of Ninigi no Mikoto (legendary), great-grandfather of Emperor Jimmu; famous for Mononobe no Moriya.
- Nakatomi clan (中臣氏) – descended from the kami Ame no Koyane no Mikoto (legendary), and his descendant Ame no Taneko no Mikoto companion in arms of Emperor Jimmu; origin of Fujiwara clan.
- Ō clan (多氏) – descended from Prince Kamuyaimimi no Mikoto, son of Emperor Jimmu; famous for Ō no Yasumaro.
- Ochi clan (越智氏) – descended from the Mononobe clan.
- Ōe clan (大江氏) – descended from the Hashiji clan.
- Ōtomo clan (大伴氏) – descended from the Michi-omi no Mikoto, companion in arms of Emperor Jimmu; no direct relation to the immigrant Ōtomo clan (大友氏) or feudal Ōtomo clan (大友氏); famous for Ōtomo no Yakamochi.
- Ozutsuki clan (大筒木氏)
- Soga clan (蘇我氏) – descended from Emperor Kōgen, by the Minister Takenouchi no Sukune; famous for Soga no Umako.
- Sugawara clan (菅原氏) – descended from the Hashiji clan; famous for Sugawara no Michizane
- Takahashi clan (高橋氏)

== Aristocratic family names ==
From the late ancient era onward, the family name (Myōji/苗字 or 名字) had been commonly used by samurai to denote their family line instead of the name of the ancient clan that the family line belongs to (uji-na/氏名 or honsei/本姓), which was used only in the official records in the Imperial court. Kuge families also had used their family name (Kamei/家名) for the same purpose. Each of samurai families is called "[family name] clan (氏)" as follows and they must not be confused with ancient clan names. The list below is a list of various aristocratic families whose families served as Shugo, Shugodai, Jitō, and Daimyo

- Abe clan of Mikawa (阿部氏) – descended from Emperor Kōgen and the ancient Abe clan (阿部氏); no direct relation to the Abe clan of Ōshū (安倍氏).

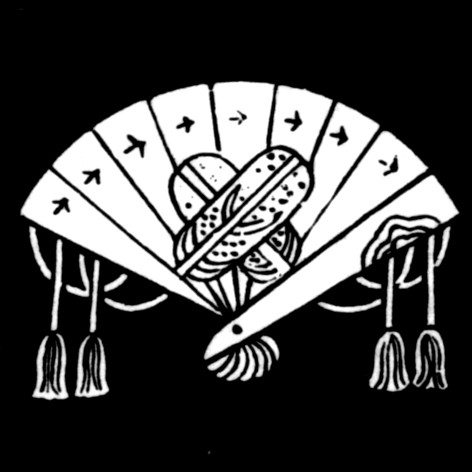
Mon of the Akita clan

- Adachi clan (安達氏) – descended from Fujiwara clan.
- Akamatsu clan (赤松氏) – descended from Murakami Genji.
- Akechi clan (明智氏) – cadet branch of Toki clan who descended from Seiwa Genji; famous for Akechi Mitsuhide.
- Akita clan (秋田氏) – descended from Abe clan of Ōshū.
- Akiyama clan (秋山氏) – cadet branch of the Takeda clan who descended from Seiwa Genji.

Mon of the Asano clan

- Akizuki clan (秋月氏) – descended from Prince Achi no Omi of the Yamato no Aya clan.
- Amago clan (尼子氏) – cadet branch of the Sasaki clan who descended from Uda Genji.
- Amakusa clan (天草氏) – descended from the Ōkura clan.
- Anayama clan (穴山氏) – cadet branch of the Takeda clan who descended from Seiwa Genji.
- Andō clan – descended from the Abe clan of Ōshū, by Abe no Hirafu.
- Asakura clan (朝倉氏) – descended from Prince Kusakabe, son of Emperor Tenmu.
- Asano clan (浅野氏) – cadet branch of the Toki clan who descended from Seiwa Genji.
- Ashikaga clan (足利氏) – descended from Seiwa Genji; famous for Ashikaga shogunate; no direct relation to the Fujiwara-descent Ashikaga clan.

Mon of the Ashikaga clan

- Ashikaga clan (Fujiwara) (足利氏) – descended from Fujiwara Hokke; no direct relation to the Genji-descent Ashikaga clan.
- Ashina clan (蘆名氏) – cadet branch of the Miura clan who descended from Kanmu Heishi.
- Aso clan (阿蘇氏) – descended from Emperor Jimmu by the Ō clan.
- Asō clan (麻生氏) – cadet branch of the Utsunomiya clan who descended from Fujiwara Hokke; famous for Tarō Asō.
- Atagi clan (安宅氏) – cadet branch of the Ogasawara clan who descended from Seiwa Genji (disputed).
- Azai clan (浅井氏) – descended from the Fujiwara clan; famous for Azai Nagamasa.
- Bitō clan (尾藤氏) – descended from Fujiwara Hokke.
- Chiba clan (千葉氏) – descended from Kanmu Heishi.
- Date clan (伊達氏) – also known as Idate clan or Idachi clan, descended from Fujiwara Hokke; famous for Date Masamune.
- Doi clan (土井氏) – cadet branch of the Toki clan who descended from Seiwa Genji (disputed); no direct relation to the Heishi-descent Doi clan.

Mon of the Hōjō clan

- Doi clan (Heishi) (土肥氏) – descended from Kanmu Heishi; no direct relation to the Genji-descent Doi clan.
- Fuji clan (富士氏) – descended from the Wani clan (和珥氏).
- Gotō clan (後藤氏) – cadet branch of the Takeda clan who descended from Seiwa Genji.
- Hachisuka clan (蜂須賀氏) – cadet branch of the Ashikaga clan by the Shiba clan who descended from Seiwa Genji, famous for Hachisuka Masakatsu.
- Haga clan (芳賀氏) – descended from the Kiyowara clan.
- Hashiba clan (羽柴氏) – also known as their honsei: Toyotomi clan (豊臣氏); descended from Toyotomi Hideyoshi.
- Hatakeyama clan (畠山氏) – descended from Kanmu Heishi before 1205. After 1205 the Hatakeyama are a cadet branch of Ashikaga clan who descended from Seiwa Genji.
- Hatano clan (波多野氏) – descended from Fujiwara Hokke.
- Hayashi clan (林氏) – descended from the Ogasawara clan, a cadet branch of Takeda clan who descended from Seiwa Genji.
- Hayashi clan of Owari (尾張林氏) – descended from the Inaba clan who descended from Prince Iyo, son of Emperor Kanmu; no direct relation to the Hayashi clan (林氏) of Jōzai Domain.
- Hiki clan (比企氏) – descended from Fujiwara Hokke.
- Hirano clan – descended from Prince Toneri, son of Emperor Tenmu, by the Kiyowara clan.
- Hisamatsu clan (久松氏) – cadet branch of the Takatsuji family who descended from Sugawara clan.

Mon of the Honda clan

- Hitotsuyanagi clan (一柳氏) – cadet branch of the Kōno clan who descended from Prince Iyo, son of Emperor Kanmu.
- Hōjō clan (北条氏) – descended from Kanmu Heishi (disputed); no direct relation to the Later Hōjō clan (北条氏) or Kitajō clan (北条氏); regents of the Kamakura shogunate.
- Later Hōjō clan (後北条氏) – also known as Hōjō clan or Go-Hōjō clan; descended from Kanmu Heishi; no direct relation to the regent Hōjō clan (北条氏) or Kitajō clan (北条氏).

Mon of the Hosokawa clan

- Honma clan (本間氏) – also known as Homma clan or Honma clan of Sado; cadet branch of Yokoyama clan who descended from Ono no Takamura (disputed).
  - Honma clan of Sakata (酒田本間氏) – cadet branch.
- Honda clan (本多氏) – descended from Fujiwara Hokke; famous for Honda Tadakatsu.
- Hosokawa clan (細川氏) – cadet branch of the Ashikaga clan who descended from Seiwa Genji.
  - Hosokawa Keichō family (細川京兆家) – head family.
  - Hosokawa Tenkyū family (細川典厩家) – cadet branch.
  - Hosokawa family of Awa (阿波細川氏) – cadet branch; descended from Hosokawa Akiharu.
  - Hosokawa family of Ōshū (奥州細川家) – cadet branch; descended from Hosokawa Akiuji.
- Hotta clan (堀田氏) – descended from Emperor Kōgen through the Ki clan.
- Ichijō family (一条家) – descended from Fujiwara Hokke.
- Ichijō clan of Tosa (土佐一条氏) – cadet branch of the Ichijō family who descended from Fujiwara Hokke.
- Ide clan (井出氏) – cadet branch of the Nikaidō clan who descended from Fujiwara Nanke.

Mon of the (Mino) Ikeda clan

- Ii clan (井伊氏) – descended from Fujiwara Hokke; famous for Ii Naotora, Ii Naomasa and Ii Naosuke.
- Iio clan (飯尾氏) – cadet branch of the Hosokawa clan; famous for Iio Noritsura.
- Ikeda clan (池田氏) – descended from Seiwa Genji; no direct relation to other clans called Ikeda.
- Ikeda clan of Iyo (伊予池田氏) – no direct relation to other clans called Ikeda.
- Ikeda clan of Mino (美濃池田氏) – no direct relation to other clans called Ikeda.
- Ikeda clan of Sasaki (池田氏) – cadet branch of the Sasaki clan; no direct relation to other clans called Ikeda.
- Ikeda clan of Settsu (摂津池田氏) – descended from the Ki clan (disputed), no direct relation to other clans called Ikeda.
- Imagawa clan (今川氏) – cadet branch of the Ashikaga clan who descended from Seiwa Genji; famous for Imagawa Yoshimoto.
- Inaba clan – cadet branch of the Kōno clan who descended from Prince Iyo, son of Emperor Kanmu.

Mon of the Inaba clan

- Inoue clan (井上氏) – descended from Seiwa Genji.

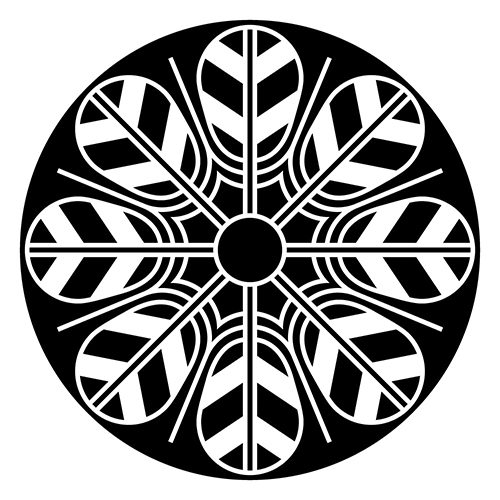
Mon of the Inoue clan

  - Inoue clan of Shinano (信濃井上氏) – head family.
  - Inoue clan of Aki (安芸井上氏) – cadet branch.
  - Inoue clan of Mikawa (三河井上氏) – cadet branch.
- Ishida clan (石田氏) – cadet branch of the Miura clan who descended from Kanmu Heishi (disputed). famous for Ishida Mitsunari
- Ishikawa clan (石川氏) – also known as Ishikawa Genji; descended from Seiwa Genji.
- Ishimaki clan (石巻氏) – descended from Nanke.
- Itō clan (伊東氏) – cadet branch of the Kudō clan who descended from Nanke.

Mon of the Itō clan

- Kamiizumi clan (上泉氏) – cadet branch of the Fujiwara-descent Ashikaga clan who descended Fujiwara Hokke.
- Kanamaru clan (金丸氏) – cadet branch of the Takeda clan who descended from Seiwa Genji by way of Takeda Nobushige.
- Kagawa clan (香川氏) – descended from Kanmu Heishi.
- Kikkawa clan (吉川氏) – cadet branch of the Kudō clan who descended from Fujiwara Nanke. After the mid 16th century they are a cadet branch of the Mōri clan who descended from the Ōe clan, famous for Kikkawa Motoharu.
- Kikuchi clan (菊池氏) – descended from the Fujiwara clan.

Mon of the Kikuchi clan

- Kira clan (吉良氏) – cadet branch of the Ashikaga clan who descended from Seiwa Genji; famous for Kira Yoshinaka.
- Kiso clan (木曾氏) – descended from Seiwa Genji; famous for Minamoto no Yoshinaka.
- Kitabatake clan (北畠氏) – descended from Murakami Genji.
- Kitajō clan (北条氏) – also known as Kitajō clan of Echigo or Mōri Kitajō clan; cadet branch of the Mōri clan; no direct relation to the Hōjō clan (北条氏) or Late Hōjō clan (北条氏).
- Kiyowara clan (清原氏) – descended from Prince Toneri, son of the Emperor Tenmu (631–686).

Mon of the Maeda clan

- Kobayakawa clan (小早川氏) – cadet branch of the Doi clan who descended from Kanmu Heishi. After the mid 16th century they are a cadet branch of the Mōri clan who descended from the Ōe clan, famous for Kobayakawa Takakage and Kobayakawa Hideaki.
- Kodama clan (児玉氏) – descended from Fujiwara Hokke.

Banner with the Mon of the Matsumae clan

- Koga family (久我家) – descended from Murakami Genji.
- Kōno clan (河野氏) – descended from Prince Iyo son of Emperor Kanmu.
- Konoe family (近衛家) – descended from Fujiwara Hokke. famous for Konoe Fumimaro.
- Kudō clan (工藤氏) – descended from Fujiwara Nanke.
- Kujō family (九条家) – descended from Fujiwara Hokke.
- Kuzuyama clan (葛山氏) – cadet branch of the Ozutsuki clan; famous for medical knowledge.
- Kyōgoku clan (京極氏) – cadet branch of the Sasaki clan who descended from Uda Genji.
- Maeda clan (前田氏) – descended from the Sugawara clan; famous for Maeda Toshiie.
- Makino clan (牧野氏) – descended from the Minamoto clan; claimed descent from the legendary Takenouchi no Sukune.
- Manabe clan (間部氏) – descended from Fujiwara Hokke.
- Matsuda clan (松田氏) – cadet branch of the Hatano clan who descended from Fujiwara Hokke.
- Matsudaira clan (松平氏) – cadet branch of the Nitta clan, by the Tokugawa clan descended from Seiwa Genji (disputed); famous for Tokugawa Ieyasu.
- Matsumae clan – cadet branch of Takeda clan who descended from Seiwa Genji.

Mon of the Mori clan (森氏)

- Matsunaga clan (松永氏) – descended from the Fujiwara clan and retainers for the Miyoshi clan. Famous for Matsunaga Danjo Hisahide.
  Mon of the Matsunaga clan
- Matsuura clan (松浦氏) – cadet branch of the Watanabe clan who descended from Saga Genji.
- Miura clan (三浦氏) – descended from Kanmu Heishi.
- Mikumo clan (三雲氏) – cadet branch of the Kodama clan who descended from Fujiwara Hokke.
- Miyahara clan (宮原氏) – descended from Ashikaga Motouji (Seiwa Genji).
- Miyoshi clan (Ogasawara) (三好氏) – cadet branch of Takeda clan, by the Ogasawara clan who descended from Seiwa Genji, famous for Miyoshi Nagayoshi; no direct relation to the Fujiwara-descent Miyoshi clan (三吉氏).

Mon of the Miyoshi clan

- Miyoshi clan (三吉氏) – descended from the Fujiwara clan; no direct relation to the Ogasahara-descent Miyoshi clan (三好氏).
- Mizuryū clan (水龍氏) – descended from Seiwa Genji.
- Mogami clan (最上氏) – cadet branch by the Shiba clan of the Ashikaga clan who descended from Seiwa Genji.

Mon of the Mōri clan

- Mori clan (森氏) – descended from Seiwa Genji; famous for Mori Ranmaru.
- Mōri clan (毛利氏) – descended from Ōe clan; no direct relation to the Genji-descent Mōri clan (毛利氏) or Fujiwara-descent Mōri clan (毛利氏); famous for Mōri Motonari and his sons.
  - Mōri clan of Inaba (因幡毛利氏) – cadet branch.
- Mōri clan (Genji) (毛利氏) – descended from Uda Genji; no direct relation to Ōe-descent Mōri clan (毛利氏) or Fujiwara-descent Mōri clan (毛利氏);
- Mōri clan (Fujiwara) (毛利氏) – descended from Fujiwara clan (disputed); no direct relation to Ōe-descent Mōri clan (毛利氏) or Genji-descent Mōri clan (毛利氏);
- Murakami clan (村上氏) – descended from Seiwa Genji.
  - Murakami clan of Inland Sea (村上水軍) – also known as Murakami Suigun; famous for their naval forces.
    - Murakami clan of Innoshima (因島村上氏)
    - Murakami clan of Kurushima (来島村上氏)
    - Murakami clan of Nōnoshima (能島村上氏)
  - Murakami clan of Shinano (信濃村上氏) – also known as Shinshū Murakami clan; famous for Murakami Yoshikiyo.
- Nagao clan (長尾氏) – descended from Kanmu Heishi; famous for Uesugi Kenshin.
- Nabeshima clan (鍋島氏) – cadet branch of Shōni clan who descended from Fujiwara Hokke.
- Nakayama family (中山家) – descended from Nakayama Tadachika, third son of Fujiwara no Tadamune of the Fujiwara Hokke. Known for Nakayama Tadayasu and his daughter Nakayama Yoshiko, mother of the Emperor Meiji.
- Niiro clan (新納氏) – cadet branch of Shimazu clan of the Satsuma Domain who descended from Seiwa Genji and the Koremune clan.
- Nakamura clan (中村氏)
- Nanbu clan (南部氏) – cadet branch of the Takeda clan who descended from Seiwa Genji.
- Nijō family (二条家) – descended from Fujiwara Hokke.
- Nitta clan (新田氏) – descended from Seiwa Genji; famous for Nitta Yoshisada.
- Niwa clan (丹羽氏) – cadet branch of the Kodama clan who descended from Fujiwara Hokke (disputed); no direct relation to the Isshiki-descent Niwa clan (丹羽氏).
- Niwa clan (Genji) (丹羽氏) – cadet branch of the Isshiki clan who descended from Seiwa Genji; no direct relation to the Kodama-descent Niwa clan (丹羽氏).
  Mon of the Oda clan
- Oda clan (織田氏) – descended from Kanmu Heishi (disputed); famous for Oda Nobunaga.
- Ôishi clan of Ako (大石氏) – descended from the Fujiwara clan. The name Oishi comes from 'Oishi no sho' in Omi province. Famous for Ōishi Yoshio.
- Ôishi clan of Shinano (大石氏) – descended from the Fujiwara clan through the Numata clan. The name Oishi comes from 'Oishi go', in Shinano province.
- Ôishi clan of Musashi (大石氏) – descended from the Kiso clan (Seiwa Genji).
- Ōkōchi clan (大河内氏) – descended from Seiwa Genji.
- Ōta clan – descended from Seiwa Genji; famous for Ōta Dōkan.
- Ogasawara clan (小笠原氏) – cadet branch of Takeda clan descended from Seiwa Genji.
  Mon of the Ogasawara clan
- Ōtomo clan (大友氏) – descended from Fujiwara Hokke; no direct relation to the immigrant Ōtomo clan (大友氏) or the ancient Ōtomo clan (大伴氏); famous for Ōtomo Sōrin.
- Ōuchi clan (大内氏) – descended from the Tatara clan and claim to descend from the royal house of Paekche.
- Rokkaku clan (六角氏) – cadet branch of the Sasaki clan who descended from Uda Genji.
- Sagara clan (相良氏) – descended from Fujiwara Nanke.
- Saitō clan (斉藤氏) – descended from Fujiwara Hokke; famous for Saitō Dōsan.
- Sakai clan (酒井氏) – cadet branch of the Nitta clan, by the Tokugawa clan who descended from Seiwa Genji.
- Sakuma clan (佐久間氏) – cadet branch of the Miura clan who descended from Kanmu Heishi.
- Sanada clan (真田氏) – cadet branch of the Unno clan/Shigeno clan who descended from Seiwa Genji; famous for Sanada Nobushige who is more commonly known as Sanada Yukimura.
- Sanjō family (三条家) – descended from Fujiwara Hokke; famous for Sanjō Sanetomi.
- Sasaki clan (佐々木氏) – descended from Uda Genji.
- Satake clan (佐竹氏) – descended from Seiwa Genji.
- Satomi clan (里見氏) – descended from Seiwa Genji.
- Sei clan (清氏) – cadet branch of the Kiyohara clan; descended from Prince Toneri; shortened version of Kiyohara. Sided with Hojo clan during the Koto Rebellion.
- Shiba clan (斯波氏) – cadet branch of the Ashikaga clan who descended from Seiwa Genji.

Mon of the Shimazu clan

- Shimizu clan of Mino (清水氏) – descended from Minamoto no Yorimitsu of the Seiwa Genji.
- Shimizu clan of Bicchu (清水氏) – descended from the Taira clan.
- Shimizu clan of Izu (清水氏) – descended from the Fujiwara clan.
- Shimizu clan of Dewa (清水氏) – cadet branch of the Mogami clan and through the Shiba clan from the Ashikaga clan (Seiwa Genji).
- Shimazu clan (島津氏) – also known as Satsuma Clan; descended from Seiwa Genji and the Koremune clan.
- Shinmen clan (新免氏) – also known as Shimmen clan; cadet branch of the Akamatsu clan who descended from Murakami Genji.
- Shioya clan (塩屋氏) – descended from the Fujiwara clan.
- Shōni clan (少弐氏) – descended from Fujiwara Hokke.
- Sō clan (宗氏) – descended from the Koremune clan.
- Sogō clan (十河氏) – descended from Emperor Keikō.

Mon of the Suwa clan

- Sōma clan (相馬氏) – cadet branch of Chiba clan who descended from Kanmu Heishi.
  - Sōma clan of Ōshū (奥州相馬氏) – head family.
  - Sōma clan of Shimōsa (下総相馬氏) – cadet branch.
- Suda clan (ja:須田) – famous for being a clan of samurai, and martial art practitioners. While the northeastern and west-central family branches state that they are descended from the Minamoto clan through the Inoue family, the family branch in Okinawa has the legend that they are descendants of the Japanese dragon (Nihon ryū).
- Sue clan (陶氏) – cadet branch of Ōuchi clan who descended from Tatara clan. famous for Sue Harukata.
- Sugi clan (杉氏) – cadet branch of Sasaki clan who descended from Uda Genji; famous for Yoshida Shōin.
- Suwa clan (諏訪氏) – more or less unknown ancestors, many believed Suwa descended from Seiwa Genji through Minamoto no Tsunetomo.
- Tachibana clan (立花氏) – cadet branch of Ōtomo clan, descended from Ōtomo Yoshinao; no direct relation to the ancient Tachibana clan (橘氏); famous for Tachibana Ginchiyo and her husband Tachibana Muneshige.

Mon of the Takeda clan

- Takanashi clan (高梨氏) – cadet branch of Inoue clan who descended from Seiwa Genji (disputed).
- Takaoka clan (高岡氏) – descended from Uda Genji or Seiwa Genji.
- Takatsuji family (高辻家) – descended from Sugawara clan.
- Takatsukasa family (鷹司家) – descended from Fujiwara Hokke.
- Takeda clan (武田氏) – also known as Takeda clan of Kai; descended from Seiwa Genji; famous for Takeda Shingen.
  - Takeda clan of Aki (安芸武田氏) – cadet branch.
  - Takeda clan of Kazusa (上総武田氏) – cadet branch.
  - Takeda clan of Wakasa (若狭武田氏) – cadet branch.

Mon of the Toki clan

- Takenaka clan (竹中氏) – cadet branch of Toki clan who descended from Seiwa Genji.
- Takigawa clan (滝川氏) – descended from Ki clan or Tomo clan (disputed).
- Tanegashima clan (種子島氏) – descended from Kanmu Heishi (disputed); famous for production of early firearms.
- To clan (東氏) – cadet branch of the Chiba clan who descend from the Taira clan.
- Toda clan (戸田氏) – descended from Fujiwara Hokke.
- Tōdō clan (藤堂氏) – clan of humble origins founded by Tōdō Takatora, who was a highly trusted commander under Toyotomi Hideyoshi and Tokugawa Ieyasu.
- Toki clan (土岐氏) – descended from the Settsu Genji, branch of Seiwa Genji.
- Tokugawa clan (徳川氏) – descended from Tokugawa Ieyasu from Matsudaira clan; famous for Tokugawa shogunate.

Mon of the Tokugawa clan

  - Tokugawa Shōgun family (徳川将軍家) – head family.
    - Tokugawa family of Kōfu (甲府徳川家) – descended from Tokugawa Tsunashige, 3rd son of Tokugawa Iemitsu.
    - Tokugawa family of Tatebayashi (館林徳川家) – descended from Tokugawa Tsunayoshi.
    - Tokugawa Yoshinobu family (徳川慶喜家) – descended from Tokugawa Yoshinobu.
  - Gosanke (御三家)
    - Tokugawa family of Kishū (紀州徳川家) – also known as Kii Tokugawa family; descended from Tokugawa Yorinobu, 10th son of Tokugawa Ieyasu; famous for Tokugawa Yoshimune and Tokugawa Iemochi.
    - Tokugawa family of Mito (水戸徳川家) – descended from Tokugawa Yorifusa, 11th son of Tokugawa Ieyasu; famous for Tokugawa Mitsukuni.
      - Tokugawa family of Matsudo (松戸徳川家) – cadet branch of Tokugawa family of Mito.
    - Tokugawa family of Owari (尾張徳川家) – descended from Tokugawa Yoshinao, 9th son of Tokugawa Ieyasu.
  - Gosankyō (御三卿)

Mon of the Uesugi clan

    - Tokugawa family of Hitotsubashi (一橋徳川家) – descended from Tokugawa Munetada, 4th son of Tokugawa Yoshimune.
    - Tokugawa family of Shimizu (清水徳川家) – descended from Tokugawa Shigeyoshi, 2nd son of Tokugawa Ieshige.
    - Tokugawa family of Tayasu (田安徳川家) – descended from Tokugawa Munetake, 2nd son of Tokugawa Yoshimune.
- Tomuro clan (戸室氏) – descended from Fujiwara Hokke.
- Torii clan (鳥井氏) – descended from Taira no Yukinori.
- Toyotomi clan (豊臣氏) – given to Toyotomi Hideyoshi and his family.
  Mon of the Toyotomi clan. It is also used by the Japanese government.
- Tsugaru clan (津軽氏) – also known as Ōura clan; descended from Fujiwara Hokke.
- Tsuru clan ( Miyako-Todomaru) – descended from Takeda Kai clan.Guardians of Kyoto (Miyako) the Capital city.
- Tsutsui clan (筒井氏) – descended from Fujiwara clan; famous for Tsutsui Junkei.
- Uesugi clan (上杉氏) – descended from Fujiwara Hokke.
  - Uesugi family of Inukake (犬懸上杉家) – descended from Uesugi Norifuji.
  - Uesugi family of Ōgigayatsu (扇谷上杉家) – descended from Uesugi Shigeaki.
  - Uesugi family of Takuma (宅間上杉家) – descended from Uesugi Shigeyoshi.
  - Uesugi family of Yamanouchi (山内上杉家) – descended from Uesugi Noriaki; famous for Uesugi Kenshin.
    - Uesugi family of Fukaya (深谷上杉家) – also known as Kobanawa Uesugi family; descended from Uesugi Norifusa.
- Ukita clan (宇喜多氏) – descended from Kojima Takanori of Seiwa Genji; famous for Ukita Hideie.
- Urakami clan (浦上氏) – descended from Emperor Kōgen by the Ki clan.

Mon 'Mitsuboshi ni ichimonji' of the Watanabe clan

- Utsunomiya clan (宇都宮氏) – descended from Fujiwara Hokke.
  - Utsunomiya clan of Shimotsuke (下野宇都宮氏) – head family.
  - Utsunomiya clan of Buzen (豊前宇都宮氏) – cadet branch.
  - Utsunomiya clan of Chikugo (筑後宇都宮氏) – cadet branch.
  - Utsunomiya clan of Iyo (伊予宇都宮氏) – cadet branch.
- Wakiya clan (脇屋氏) – cadet branch of Nitta clan who descended from Seiwa Genji.
- Watanabe clan (渡辺) – descended from the Saga Genji.
- Yagyū clan (柳生氏) – descended from Sugawara clan; famous for their swordsmanship called Yagyū Shinkage-ryū.
- Yamana clan (山名氏) – cadet branch of Nitta clan who descended from Seiwa Genji.
- Yamanouchi clan (山内氏) – also known as Yamanouchi Sudō clan, descended from Fujiwara Hokke.
  - Yamanouchi clan of Bingo (備後山内氏) – head family.
  - Yamanouchi clan of Ōshū (奥州山内氏) – cadet branch.
  - Yamanouchi clan of Tosa (土佐山内氏) – cadet branch; famous for Yamauchi Kazutoyo.
- Yanagisawa clan – cadet branch of Takeda clan who descended from Seiwa Genji.

Mon of the Yanagizawa clan

- Yonekura clan – cadet branch of Takeda clan who descended from Seiwa Genji.
- Yūki clan (結城氏) – descended from Fujiwara Hokke.

Mon of the Yūki clan

  - Yūki clan of Shimousa (下総結城氏) – head family.
  - Yūki clan of Shirakawa (白河結城氏) – cadet branch.

=== Zaibatsu ===
Zaibatsu were the industrial and financial vertically integrated business conglomerates in the Empire of Japan, whose influence and size allowed control over significant parts of the Japanese economy from the Meiji period until the end of World War II.

- Iwasaki family (岩崎家) – founder of Mitsubishi; descended from Takeda clan from Seiwa Genji
- Mitsui family (三井家) – founder of Mitsui; descended from Fujiwara Hokke. However, Mitsui Takatoshi's great-great-grandfather's father was originally from the Rokkaku clan and had married into the early Mitsui family.
- Sumitomo family (住友家) – founder of Sumitomo; descended from Kanmu Heishi

=== Sacerdotal clans ===
- Abe clan
- Kamo clan
- Nakatomi clan
- Urabe clan

=== Ryukyu ===
Ryukyuan people are not Yamato people, but the Ryukyu Islands have been part of Japan since 1879.

Mon of the Ryukyu Kingdom

Ryukyuan dynasties:

- Tenson Dynasty (天孫王朝) – legendary dynasty (ended 12th century)
- Shunten Dynasty (舜天王統) – first dynasty of Ryukyu (1187–1259)
- Eiso Dynasty (英祖王統) – second dynasty of Ryukyu (1260–1354)
- Haniji Dynasty (怕尼芝王統) – kings of Hokuzan (1314–1416)
- Ōzato Dynasty (大里王統) – kings of Nanzan (1314–1429)
- Satto Dynasty (察度王統) – kings of Chūzan (1355–1407)
- First Shō Dynasty (第一尚氏) – kings of the Ryukyu Kingdom (1407–1469)
- Minshi Kameya family (明氏亀谷家) – descended from Shō Toku, last king of the First Shō Dynasty.
- Second Shō Dynasty (第二尚氏) – kings of the Ryukyu Kingdom (1469–1879)

== Immigrant clans ==
Toraijin is used to describe migrants in many contexts, from the original migration of a Yamato peoples to more recent migrants. According to the book Shinsen Shōjiroku compiled in 815, a total 326 out of 1,182 families in the Kinai area on Honshū were regarded as people with foreign genealogy. The book specifically encompasses immigrants from ancient Korea and China and that these families are considered notable, although not inherently noble.

Despite the book being highly regarded by many, there are certain claims that are under scrutiny by modern historians, and some corrections and revisions have been made over the recent years with certain clans of specific origins being classified differently.

=== Paekche (Korea) ===
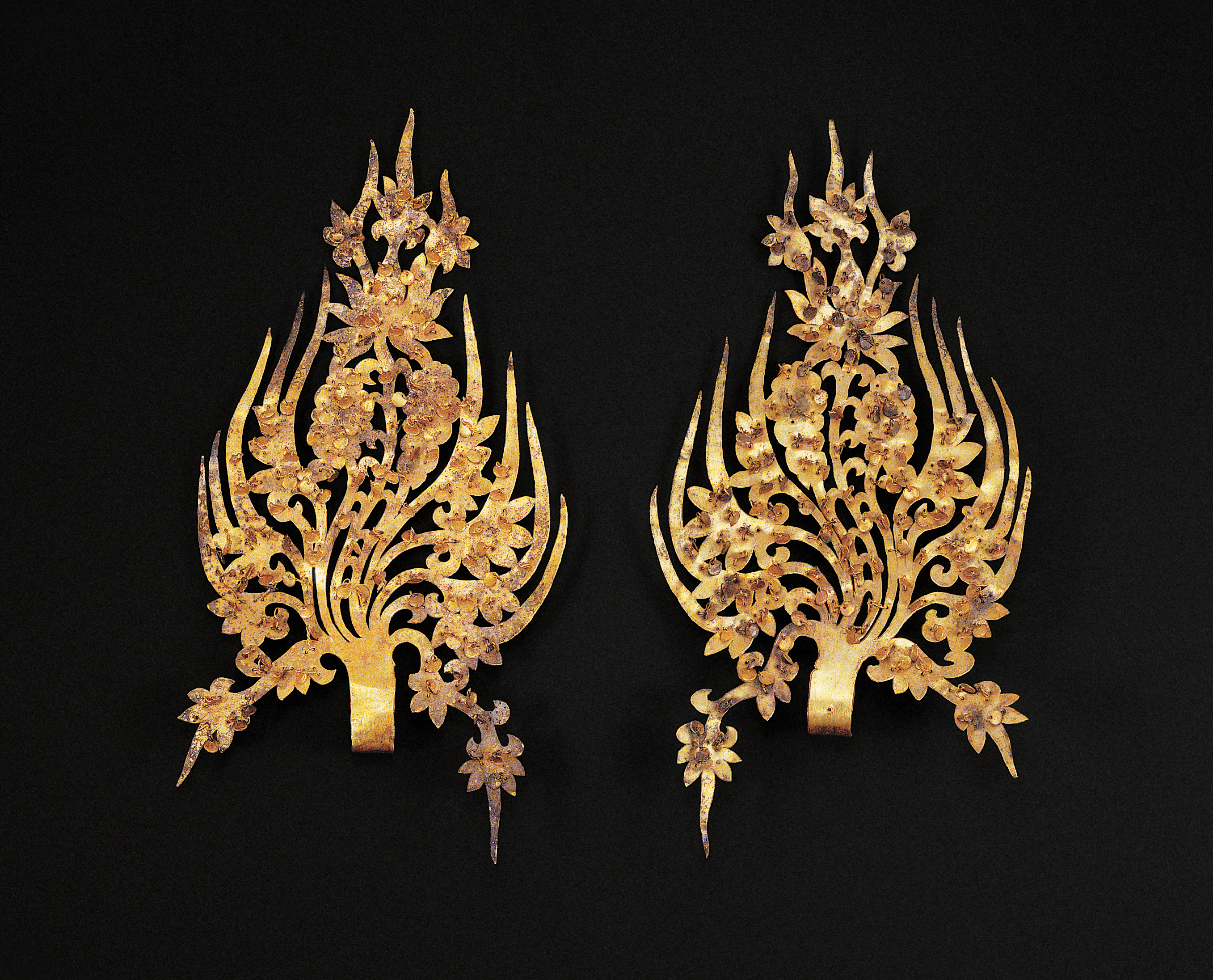
Crown of Baekje found in the Tomb of King Muryeong

- Asukabe clan (飛鳥部氏) – descended from Buyeo Gonji, younger brother of King Munju of Baekje and son of King Gaero of Baekje.
- Fuha clan (不破氏)
- Funa clan (船氏)
- Hirota clan (廣田氏)
- Ka clan (賈氏)
- Kaguyama clan (香山氏)
- Kawachinofumi clan (西文氏) – descended from the scholar Wani. Related to the Yamatonofumi clan.
- Kazurai clan (葛井氏)
- Kinunui clan (衣縫氏)
- Kudara no Konikishi clan (百済王氏) – descended from Zenkō (善光 or 禅広), son of the last king of Paekche, King Uija.
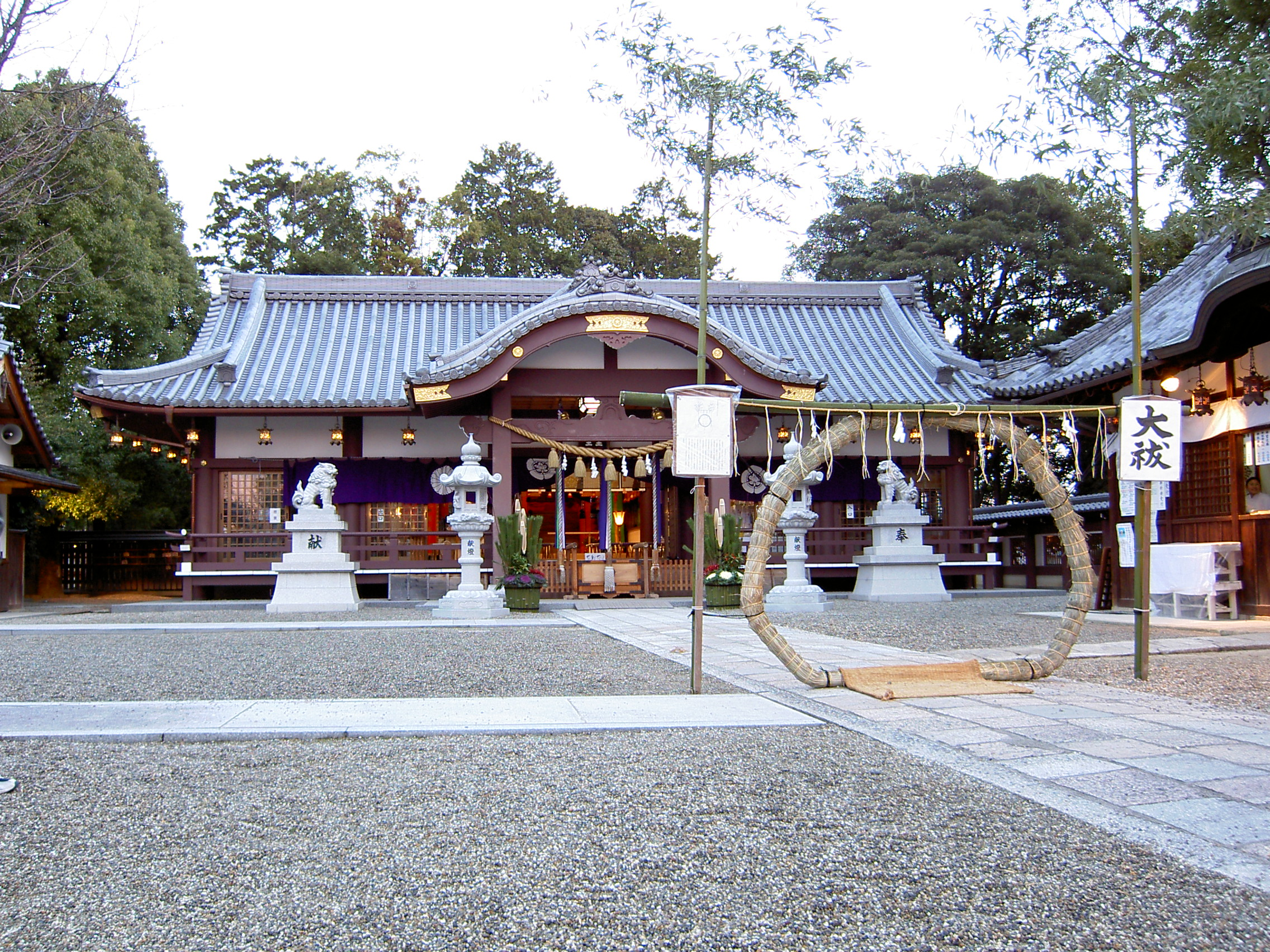
  Kudara shrine of the Kudara no Konikishi clan
  - Mimatsu clan (三松氏) – cadet branch of Kudara no Konikishi clan.
  - Miyake clan (三宅氏) – cadet branch of Kudara no Konikishi clan.
- Ōhara clan (大原氏) – descended from an unspecified king of Paekche. Not to be confused with the Ōhara clan of the same name from the Azuchi–Momoyama period.
- Ōuchi clan (大内氏) – descended from Prince Imseong, third son of King Seong of Baekje.
  Mon of Ōuchi clan
  - Sue clan (陶氏) – cadet branch of Ōuchi clan.
  - Washizu clan (鷲頭氏) – cadet branch of Ōuchi clan.
  - Yamaguchi clan (Chūgoku) (山口氏) – cadet branch of Ōuchi clan and Tatara clan.
  - Yamaguchi clan (Owari) (山口氏) – cadet branch of Ōuchi clan and Tatara clan.
- Sakata clan (坂田氏)
- Sugano clan (菅野氏)
- Toyoda clan (豊田氏) – descended from Prince Imseong, third son of King Seong of Baekje. Also known as the Toyota clan.
- Tsu clan (津氏)
- Yamato no Fuhito clan (和史氏) – descended from Prince Junda, son of King Muryeong of Baekje.
  - Takano clan (高野氏) – cadet branch of Yamato clan, famous for Takano no Niigasa.
- Yamato no Aya clan (東漢氏) – descended from Achi no Omi.
  - Akizuki clan (秋月氏) – cadet branch of Yamato no Aya clan.

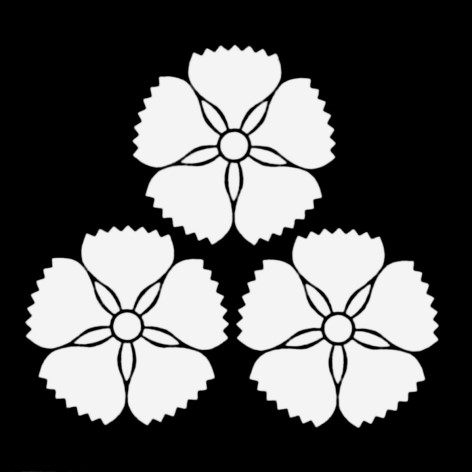
Mon of Akizuki clan

  - Haruda clan (原田氏) – cadet branch of Yamato no Aya clan.
  - Inoue clan (井上氏) – cadet branch of Yamato no Aya clan. Not to be confused with the Seiwa Genji Inoue clan.
  - Kawachinoaya clan (西漢氏) – cadet branch of Yamato no Aya clan.
  - Ōkura clan (大蔵氏) – cadet branch of Yamato no Aya clan.
  - Sakanoue clan (坂上氏) – cadet branch of Yamato no Aya clan.
  - Nishiki clan (錦氏) – cadet branch of Yamato no Aya clan.
  - Nishikibe clan (錦部氏) – cadet branch of Yamato no Aya clan.
  - Takamuko clan (高向氏) – cadet branch of Yamato no Aya clan; famous for Takamuko no Kuromaro. Not to be confused with a different Takamuko clan of the same name that descends from Takenouchi no Sukune.
  - Tamura clan (田村氏) – cadet branch of Yamato no Aya clan.
- Yamatonofumi clan (東文氏) – descended from the scholar Wani. Related to the Kawachinofumi clan.

=== Goguryeo (Korea) ===
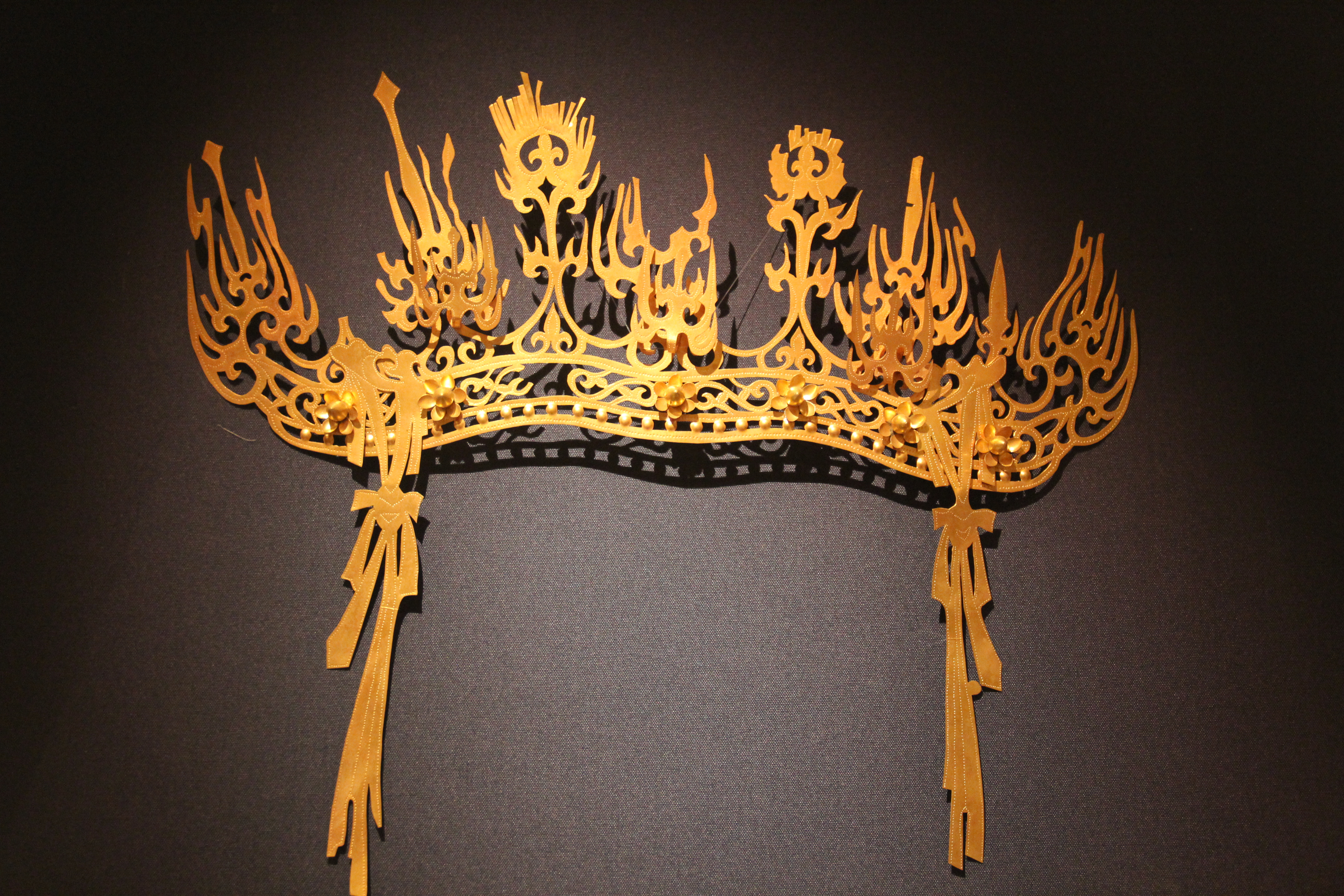
Crown of Goguryeo

- Kifumi clan (黄文氏) – descended from King Yeongnyu of Goguryeo.
- Koma clan (高麗氏) – descended from Jakkō, son of the last of Goguryeo, King Bojang of Goguryeo.
- Kuwabara clan (桑原氏)
- Sena clan (背奈氏) – descended from Sena no Fukutoku (背奈福徳), son of King Yeongnyu of Goguryeo.
- Toyohara clan (豊原氏)
- Yasaka clan (八坂氏)
- Yahamara clan (八坂氏豊原氏)

=== Silla (Korea) ===
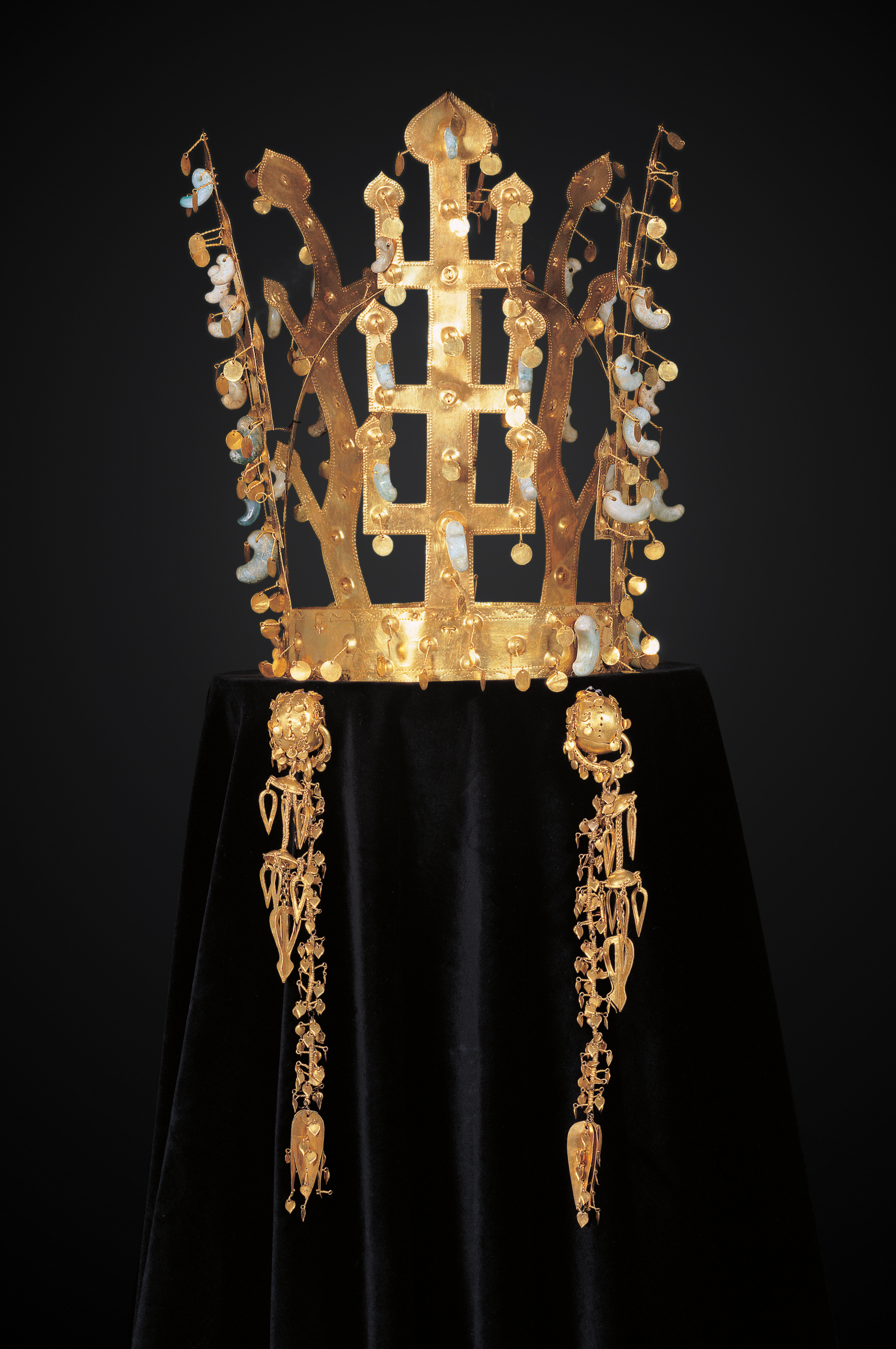
Crown of Silla

- Hata clan (秦氏) – claims to be descended from Yuzuki no Kimi. The clan later claimed descent from Qin Shi Huang, but recent Japanese research points this to be aggrandization and their true origin to be from Silla.
  - Chōshi clan (調子氏) – cadet branch of Hata clan.
  - Chōsokabe clan (長宗我部氏) – descended from Hata clan (disputed); famous for Chōsokabe Motochika.

Mon of Chōsokabe clan

  - Fujiki clan (藤木氏) – cadet branch of Hata clan.
  - Hakura clan (羽倉氏) – cadet branch of Hata clan.
  - Hirata clan (平田氏) – cadet branch of Hata clan.
  - Kada clan (荷田氏) – cadet branch of Hata clan.
  - Kawakatsu clan (川勝氏) – cadet branch of Hata clan, named after Hata no Kawakatsu.

Mon of Kawakatsu clan

  - Matsumuro clan (松室氏) – cadet branch of Hata clan.
  - Matsuo clan (松尾氏) – cadet branch of Hata clan.
  - Matsushita clan (松下氏) – cadet branch of Hata clan.
  - Mikami clan (三上氏) – cadet branch of Hata clan.
  - Minami clan (南氏) – cadet branch of Hata clan.
  - Mokusei clan (木星) – cadet branch of the Hata Clan.
  - Nishiōji clan (西大路氏) – cadet branch of Hata clan.
  - Obata clan (小畑氏) – cadet branch of Hata clan.
  - Ōkura clan (大蔵氏) – cadet branch of Hata clan.
  - Ōnishi clan (大西氏) – cadet branch of Hata clan.
  - Seo clan (瀬尾氏) – cadet branch of Hata clan.
  - Tōgi clan (東儀氏) – cadet branch of Hata clan.
  - Tsuchiyama clan (土山氏) – cadet branch of Hata clan.
    - Koremune clan (惟宗氏) – lateral branch of the Hata clan.
- Fushimaru clan (伏丸氏)
- Hine clan (日根氏)
- Itoi clan (糸井氏) – descended from Amenohiboko, a prince of Silla who came to Japan in the 3rd or 4th century.
- Maki clan (真城氏)
- Ōtomo clan (大友氏) – claims to be descended from Mantoku no Omi of Goguryeo. The clan later claimed descent from Emperor Gaozu, Ling, and Xian of Han, but recent Japanese research points this to be aggrandization and their true origin to be from Silla; no direct relation to the native Ōtomo clan (大伴氏) or feudal Ōtomo clan (大友氏) of the same name.
  - Shiga clan (志賀氏) – cadet branch of Ōtomo clan through Ōtomo no Suguri (大友村主).
- Tachibanamori clan (橘守氏) – descended from Amenohiboko, a prince of Silla who came to Japan in the 3rd or 4th century.
- Tajima clan (但馬氏) – descended from Amenohiboko, a prince of Silla who came to Japan in the 3rd or 4th century.
- Unabara clan (海原氏)

=== Kaya (Korea) ===
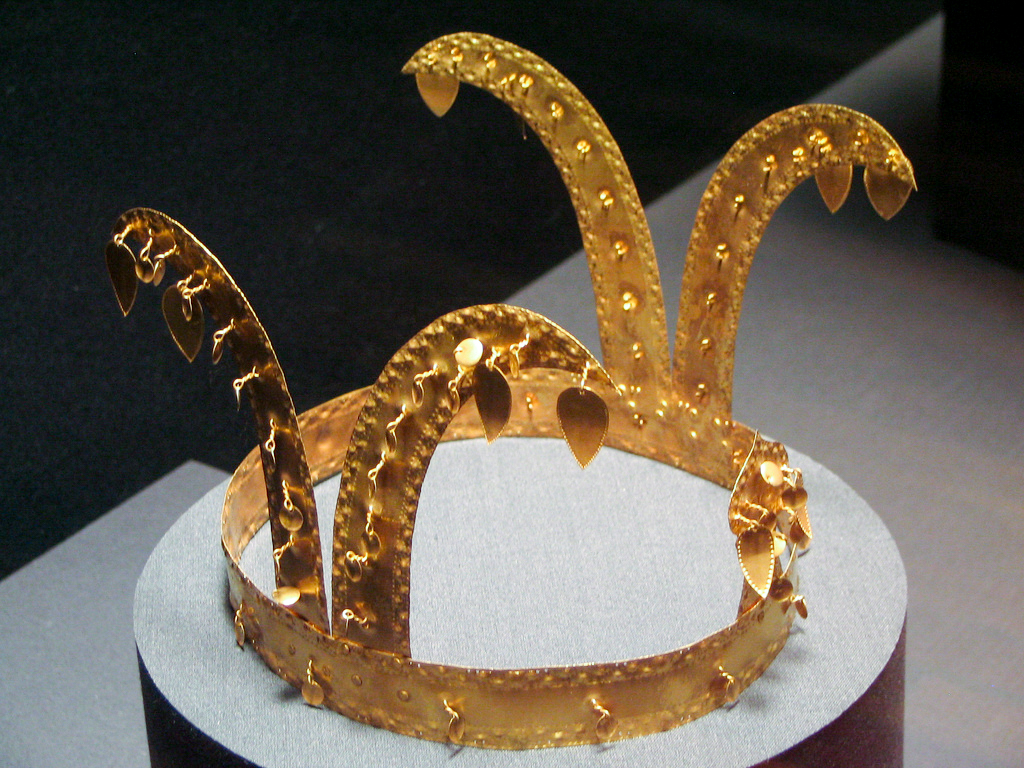
Crown of Kaya

- Arara clan (荒荒氏)
- Hirata clan (辟田氏) – descended from Tsunugaarashito (都怒我阿羅斯等), a prince of Kaya.
- Karabito clan (韓人氏)
- Michita clan (道田氏)
- Ōchi clan (大市氏) – descended from Tsunugaarashito (都怒我阿羅斯等), a prince of Kaya.
- Tatara clan (多々良氏) – descended from Irigumo of Kaya.
- Toyotsu clan (豊津氏)

=== China ===
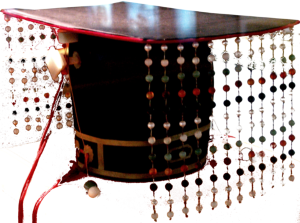
Mianguan of China

- Asatsuma clan (朝妻氏) – descended from Tsuru no Omi (都留使主) of the Karakuni no Hito (韓国人) family. Due to the family name "Karakuni no Hito" meaning "Korean people", it may be under the wrong category.
- Mamuta clan (茨田氏) – descended from Sun Hao.
- Nishigori clan (錦織氏) – descended from Hanoji (波努志) of the Karakuni no Hito (韓国人) family. Due to the family name "Karakuni no Hito" meaning "Korean people", it may be under the wrong category.
- Wakae clan (若江氏) – descended from Emperor Ling of Han; originally have come from Paekche.
- Yako clan (陽侯氏) – descended from Emperor Yang of Sui.

== See also ==
- Four divisions of society
- Japanese names
- Mon (badge)
