= Kamiizumi clan =

- Home province: Kai
- Parent house: Ashikaga clan (Fujiwara)
- Founding year: 16th century

The Kamiizumi clan (上泉氏, Kamiizumi-shi) was a Japanese clan that originated in Kai Province primarily during the Sengoku Period of the 16th century. The Kamiizumi clan served loyally under the local family of Uesugi throughout the course of the 16th century.

One very famous member of the clan of note was Kamiizumi Hidetsuna. Hidetsuna could be considered technically to be the creator of the Yagyū Shinkage ryū fighting style. This was through the fact that Yagyū Muneyoshi (the father of the famous Yagyū Munenori) served as a prime student under Hidetsuna. Through the fighting style that Hidetsuna passed down to Muneyoshi assisted in the birth of the Shinkage-Ryū.
