= Ashikaga clan =

Rulers of Japan (1333–1573)

Ashikaga clan 足利
- Ashikaga Futatsubiki (足利二つ引き), the Ashikaga clan mon
- Parent house: Minamoto clan (Seiwa Genji)
- Titles: Various
- Founder: Minamoto no Yoshiyasu (Ashikaga Yoshiyasu)
- Final ruler: Ashikaga Yoshiaki
- Ruled until: 1573, Ashikaga shogunate deposed by Oda Nobunaga
- Cadet branches: Hosokawa clan Imagawa clan Hatakeyama clan (restored line); Asano clan (after Asano Nagamasa); Kira clan Shiba clan Hachisuka clan others

The Ashikaga clan (Japanese: 足利氏, Hepburn: Ashikaga-shi; Japanese pronunciation: [ä̀.ɕi̥.kä́.ɡä̀, -ŋä̀, -ɡä́, -ŋä́]) was a Japanese samurai clan and dynasty which established the Ashikaga shogunate and ruled Japan from roughly 1333 to 1573. The Ashikaga were descended from a branch of the Minamoto clan, deriving originally from the town of Ashikaga in Shimotsuke Province (modern-day Tochigi Prefecture).

For about a century, the clan was divided in two rival branches, the Kantō Ashikaga, who ruled from Kamakura, and the Kyōto Ashikaga, rulers of Japan. The rivalry ended with the defeat of the first in 1439. The clan had many notable branch clans, including the Hosokawa, Imagawa, Hatakeyama (after 1205), Kira, Shiba, and Hachisuka clans. After the head family of the Minamoto clan died out during the early Kamakura period, the Ashikaga came to style themselves as the head of the Minamoto, co-opting the prestige which came with that name.

Another Ashikaga clan, not related by blood, and derived instead from the Fujiwara clan, also existed.

== History ==
Emperor Go-Daigo (1288–1339) destroyed the Kamakura shogunate in 1333, but was unable to control the unrest produced. The emperor's inefficient rule led to one of his greatest generals, Ashikaga Takauji (1305–1358), to betray him in 1335. This established the Northern Court, named after its location in Kyoto, which was north of Go-Daigo's court. The conflict between Go-Daigo and the Ashikaga clan is known as the Northern and Southern Courts disturbance (南北朝の動乱). In 1392, the Southern Court surrendered to the third shogun Ashikaga Yoshimitsu (1358–1408).

== Notable Shōgun ==
The Ashikaga clan had 15 Shōguns from 1333 to 1573. Some were more powerful or prominent than others. Ashikaga Yoshimitsu was the third shogun of the Ashikaga clan. He made the Ashikaga Shogunate strong and stable. Ashikaga Yoshimitsu was responsible for the defeat of the Southern Court in 1392. Known for his patronage of the arts, he constructed the Kinkaku-ji in 1397. Yoshimitsu also expanded foreign relations with Ming China. Yoshimitsu sent an embassy to Ming Dynasty China in 1401, headed by priest Soa and Hakata merchant Koetomi. They brought with them a conciliatory memorial to the emperor, and numerous gifts including horses, fans, gold, screens, paper, swords, armor, and inkstone cases. The mission was successful, and returned to Japan the following year. A Ming envoy returned alongside Soa and Koetomi, and presented Yoshimitsu with an official imperial Chinese calendar, and documents officially recognizing (or investing) him as "King of Japan."

After the death of Yoshimitsu, the Ashikaga Shogunate lost power and influence. In 1429, Ashikaga Yoshinori, the sixth shogun, adapted Yoshimitsu's policies in order to strengthen the power of the Shogunate. He wanted to increase military power but faced opposition. His 12-year reign saw the restoration of diplomatic ties and trade between Japan and China that had been the fourth Shogun, Yoshimochi's undertaking.

Ashikaga Yoshiaki was the 15th and last Shogun. He came into power in 1568 with the help of the general Oda Nobunaga. After rivalry emerged between the two, Nobunaga defeated Yoshiaki and banished him from Kyoto. This effectively ended the rule of the Ashikaga clan in 1573.

== Clan heads ==
1. Ashikaga Yoshiyasu
2. Ashikaga Yoshikane
3. Ashikaga Yoshiuji
4. Ashikaga Yasuuji

5. Ashikaga Yoriuji
6. Ashikaga Ietoki
7. Ashikaga Sadauji
8. Ashikaga Takauji

=== Samurai, Daimyōs and Shōguns ===
1. Ashikaga Takauji
2. Ashikaga Yoshiakira
3. Ashikaga Yoshimitsu
4. Ashikaga Yoshimochi
5. Ashikaga Yoshikazu
6. Ashikaga Yoshinori
7. Ashikaga Yoshikatsu
8. Ashikaga Yoshimasa

9. Ashikaga Yoshihisa
10. Ashikaga Yoshitane
11. Ashikaga Yoshizumi
12. Ashikaga Yoshiharu
13. Ashikaga Yoshiteru
14. Ashikaga Yoshihide
15 Ashikaga Yoshiaki

=== Notable ===
- Ashikaga Chachamaru
- Ashikaga Masatomo
- Ashikaga Mitsukane
- Ashikaga Mochiuji
- Ashikaga Motouji
- Ashikaga Satouji
- Ashikaga Shigeuji
- Ashikaga Tadafuyu
- Ashikaga Tadayoshi
- Ashikaga Tadatsuna
- Ashikaga Ujimitsu
- Ashikaga Yoshimi

== Family tree ==
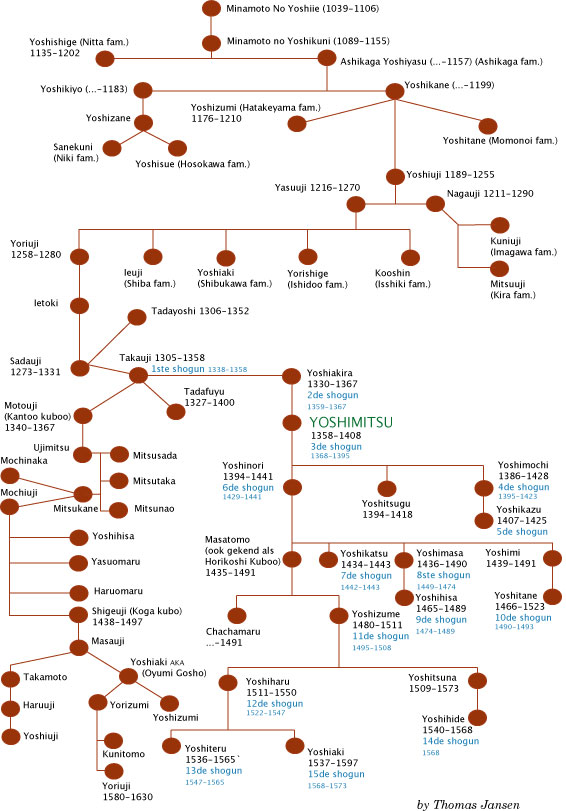
Picture of the genealogy of the Ashikaga.

== See also ==
- Muromachi period
- Kantō Kubō
- Ashikaga clan (Fujiwara)
