= Kazoku =

1869–1947 Japanese system of nobility

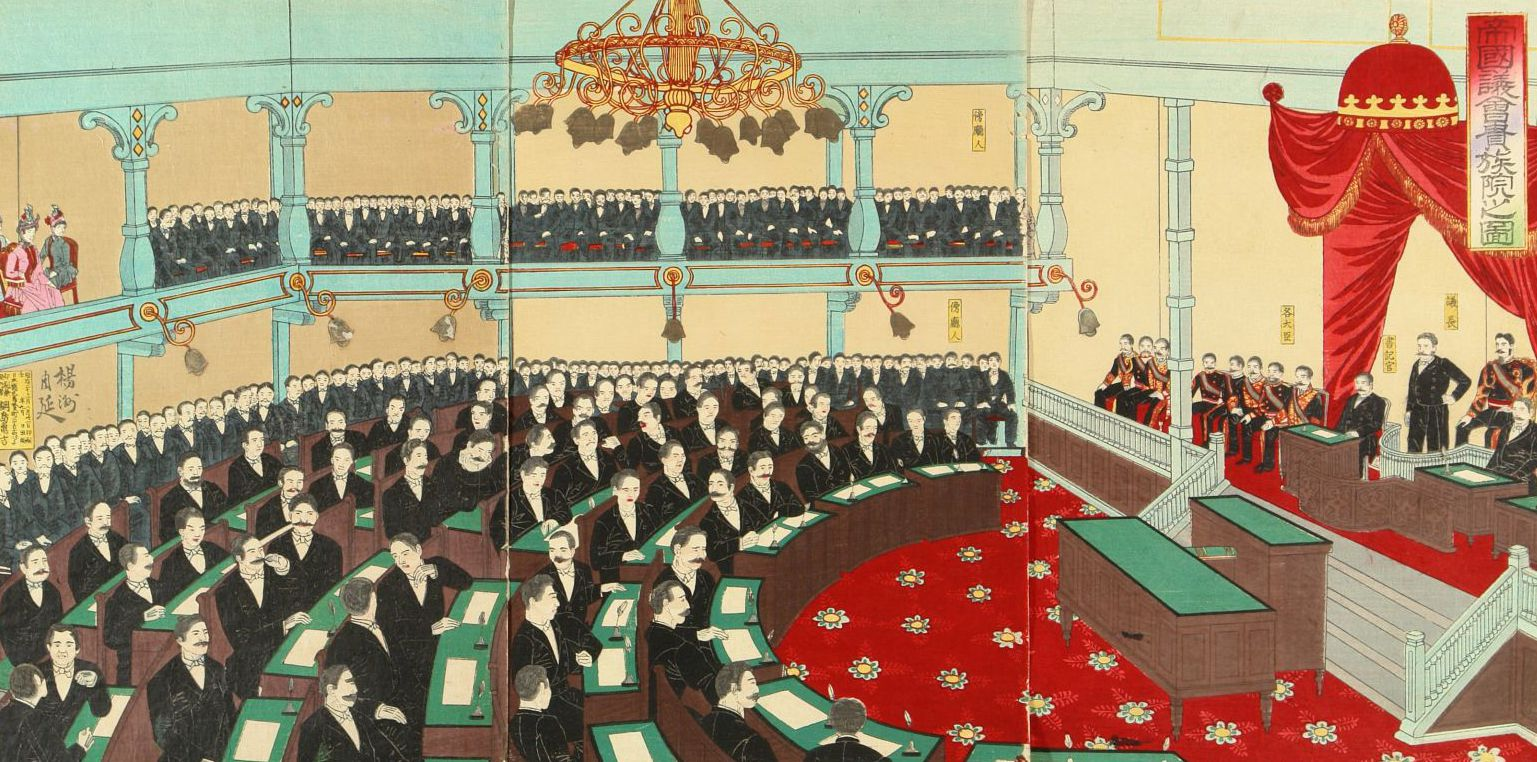
The House of Peers in session with Emperor Meiji giving a speech (Ukiyo-e woodblock print by Yōshū Chikanobu, 1890)

The Kazoku (華族, "Flowery lineage"; IPA: [ka̠zo̞kɯ̟]) was the hereditary peerage of the Empire of Japan, which existed between 1869 and 1947. It was formed by merging the feudal lords (daimyō) and court nobles (kuge) into one system modelled after the British peerage. Distinguished military officers, politicians, and scholars were occasionally ennobled as shin kazoku (新華族, "the newly ennobled"), until the country's defeat in the Second World War in 1945. The system was abolished with the 1947 constitution, which prohibited any form of aristocracy under it, but kazoku descendants still form the core of the traditional upper class in the country's society, distinct from the nouveau riche.

Kazoku (華族) should not be confused with kazoku (家族), which is pronounced the same in Japanese, but written with a different first character, meaning "immediate family" (as in the film Kazoku).

== Origins ==
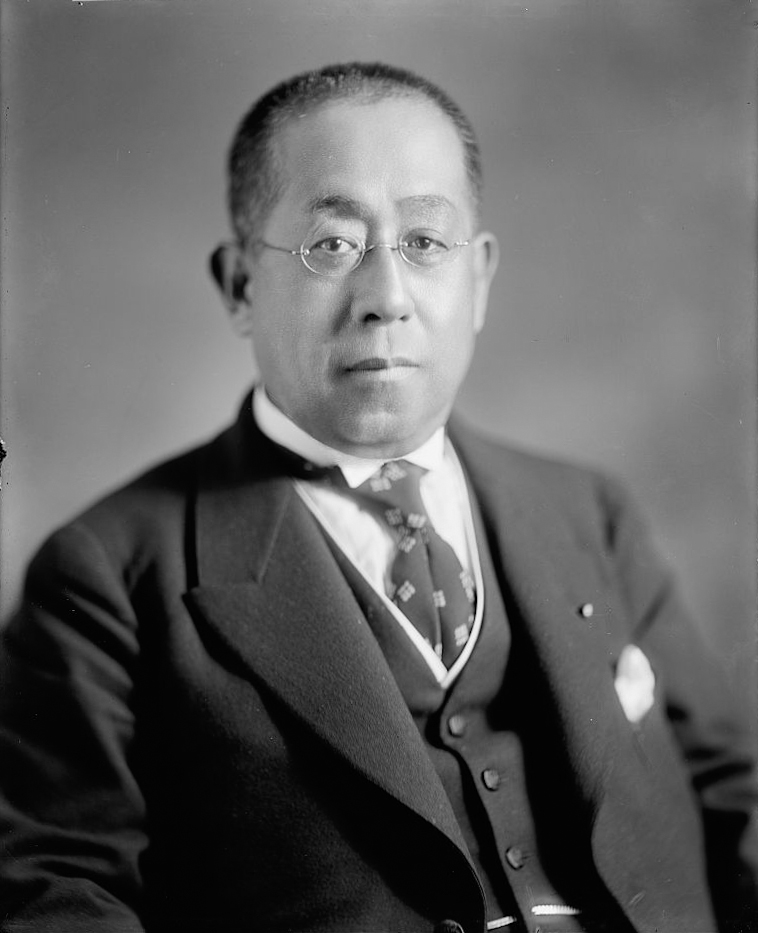
Prince Tokugawa Iesato, first head of the Tokugawa clan after the overthrow of the shogunate, was President of the House of Peers from 1903 to 1933.

Following the Meiji Restoration of 1868, the ancient court nobility of Kyoto, the kuge (公家), regained some of its lost status. Several members of the kuge, such as Iwakura Tomomi and Nakayama Tadayasu, played a crucial role in the overthrow of the Tokugawa shogunate, and the early Meiji government nominated kuge to head all seven of the newly established administrative departments.

The Meiji oligarchs, as part of their Westernizing reforms, merged the kuge with the former daimyō (大名, feudal lords) into an expanded aristocratic class on 25 July 1869, to recognize that the kuge and former daimyō were a social class distinct from the other designated social classes of shizoku (士族, former samurai) and heimin (平民, commoners). They lost their territorial privileges. Itō Hirobumi, one of the principal authors of the Meiji Constitution, intended the new kazoku peerage to serve as a political and social bulwark for the "restored" emperor and the Japanese imperial institution. At the time, the kuge (142 families) and former daimyō (285 families) consisted of a group of total 427 families.

All members of the kazoku without an official government appointment in the provinces were initially obliged to reside in Tokyo. By the end of 1869, a pension system was adopted, which gradually displaced the kazoku from their posts as provincial governors and as government leaders. The stipends promised by the government were eventually replaced by government bonds.

== Development ==
In 1884 the kazoku were reorganized and the old feudal titles were replaced with:

1. Prince, the equivalent of a European Duke (公爵, Kōshaku)
2. Marquess (侯爵, Kōshaku)
3. Count, the equivalent of a Count or Earl (伯爵, Hakushaku)
4. Viscount (子爵, Shishaku)
5. Baron (男爵, Danshaku)

There were several categories within the kazoku. The initial rank distribution for kazoku houses of kuge descent depended on the highest possible office to which its ancestors had been entitled in the imperial court. Thus, the heirs of the five regent houses (go-sekke) of the Fujiwara dynasty (Konoe, Takatsukasa, Kujō, Ichijō and Nijō) all became princes, the equivalent of a European duke, upon the establishment of the kazoku in 1884.

The heads of eight other families (Daigo, Hirohata, Kikutei, Koga, Saionji, Tokudaiji, Ōinomikado and Kasannoin) all with the rank of seiga, the second rank in the kuge, became marquesses at the same time. Those family heads in the third tier of the kuge and with the rank of daijin became counts. Heads of families in the lowest three tiers (those in the ranks of urin, mei and han) typically became viscounts, but could also be ennobled as counts.

Other appointments to the two highest ranks in the kazoku—prince and marquess—from among the kuge were also made to reward certain kuge families for their roles in the Meiji Restoration, for taking a prominent role in national affairs or for their close degree of relationship to the Imperial family. Thus the head of the seiga-ranked Sanjo house became a prince in 1884. The heads of the Tokudaiji and the Saionji houses were advanced to the rank of prince from the rank of marquess in 1911 and 1920, respectively.

In recognition of his father's role in the Meiji Restoration, Iwakura Tomosada, the heir of noble Iwakura Tomomi and whose family had been in the fourth tier of kuge nobility, with the rank of urin, was ennobled as a prince in 1884. Nakayama Tadayasu, the Meiji Emperor's maternal grandfather and also from an urin-ranked family, was ennobled as a marquess. The head of the Shō family, the former royal family of the Ryūkyū Kingdom (Okinawa), was given the title of marquess. When the Korean Empire was annexed in 1910, the House of Yi was mediatized as an incorporated and therefore subordinate kingship (王). Some Korean princes were also made Japanese princes (公).

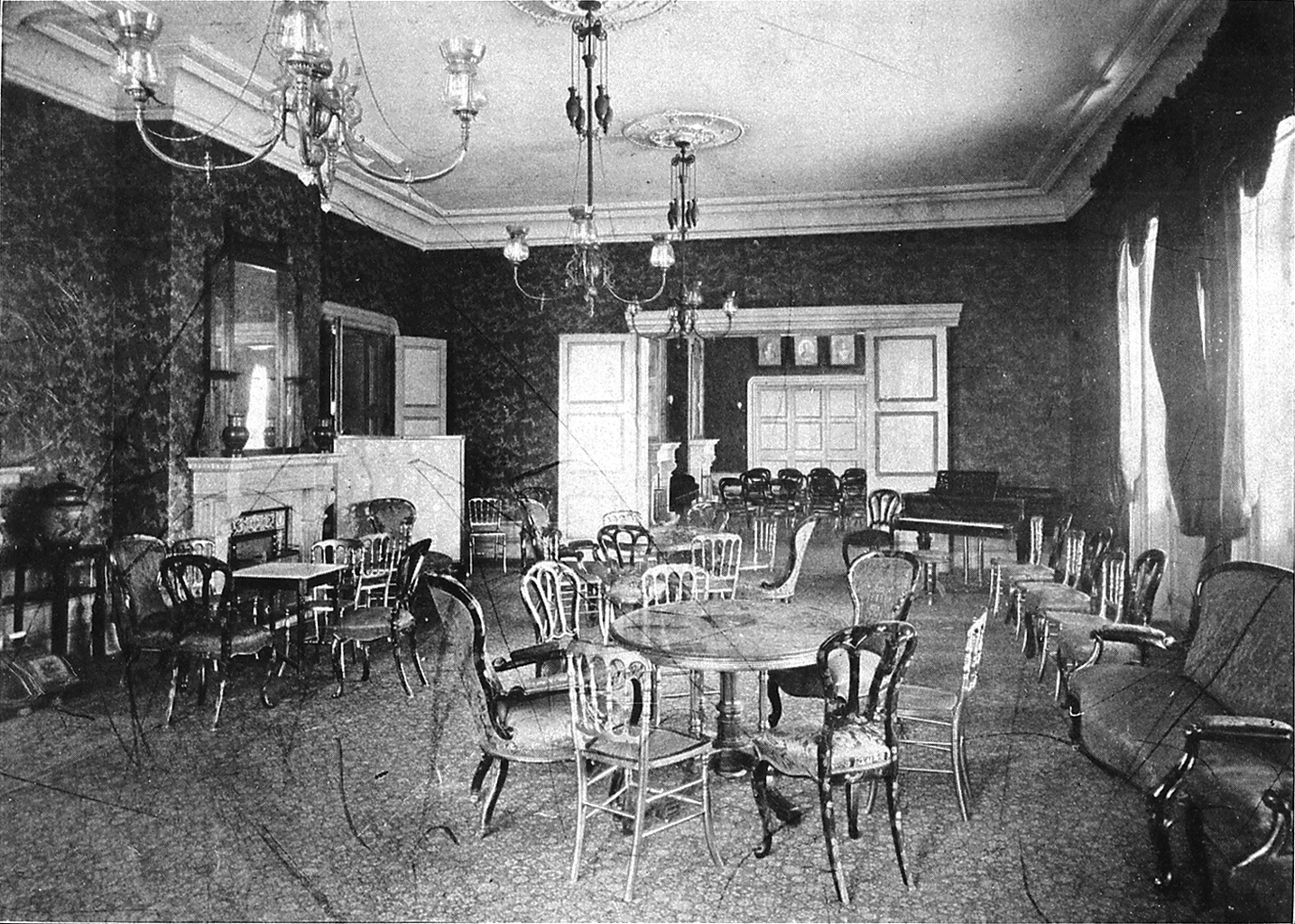
The interior of the Peers' Club, Tokyo (1912). Unlike Western-style gentlemen's clubs, membership was also open to women.

Excluding the Tokugawas, the initial kazoku rank distribution for the former daimyō lords depended on rice revenue: those with 150,000 koku or more became marquesses, those with 50,000 koku or more become counts, and those with holdings rated below 50,000 koku became viscounts. The head of the Tokugawa clan, Tokugawa Iesato, became a prince, the heads of primary Tokugawa branch houses (shinpan daimyō) became marquesses, the heads of the secondary branches became counts and the heads of more distant branches became viscounts. The head of the Matsudaira (Fukui Domain) branch was raised to the rank of marquess from the rank of count in 1888. In 1902, the former shōgun Tokugawa Yoshinobu was created a prince, and the head of the Mito shinpan house was raised to the same rank, prince, in 1929.

Of the other former daimyō clans, the heads of the Mōri (Chōshū Domain) and Shimazu (Satsuma Domain) clans were both ennobled as princes in 1884 for their role in the Meiji Restoration; the Yamauchi (Tosa Domain) clan was given the rank of marquess. The heads of the main Asano (Hiroshima Domain), Ikeda (Okayama and Tottori Domains), Kuroda (Fukuoka Domain), Satake (Kubota Domain), Nabeshima (Saga Domain), Hachisuka (Tokushima Domain), Hosokawa (Kumamoto Domain) and Maeda (Kaga Domain) clans became marquesses in 1884.

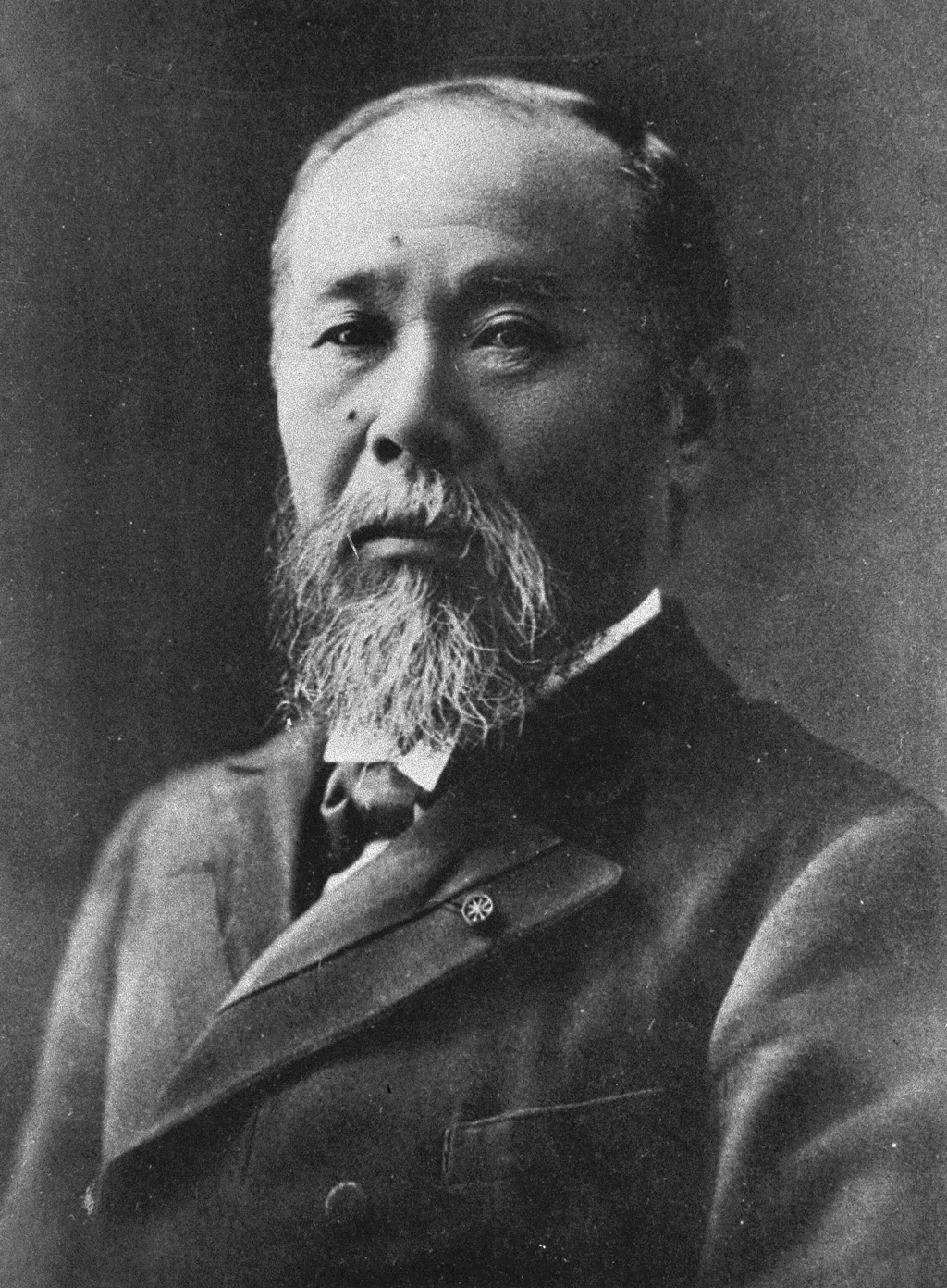
Japan's first Prime Minister Itō Hirobumi, despite being born the son of an impoverished farmer, he was ennobled as prince.

Notably, the head of the main family line of the Date clan, which had formerly ruled the extensive Sendai Domain, was only ennobled as a count and was thus denied a hereditary seat in the House of Peers; this was likely due to the domain's prominent role as the leader of a coalition against the Imperial forces during the Boshin War. In 1891, the head of the Date-Uwajima family (Uwajima Domain), a cadet branch of the clan which had remained loyal to the Emperor during the conflict, was raised to the rank of marquess, having been ennobled as a count in 1884.

Many of those who had significant roles in the Meiji Restoration, or their heirs, were ennobled. Ito Hirobumi and Yamagata Aritomo were ennobled as counts in 1884, promoted to marquesses in 1895 and finally became princes in 1907. The heirs of Okubo Toshimichi and Kido Takayoshi, two of the three great nobles of the Meiji Restoration, were ennobled as marquesses in 1884, followed by the heirs of samurai general-politician Saigō Takamori in 1902.

== Succession and numbers ==
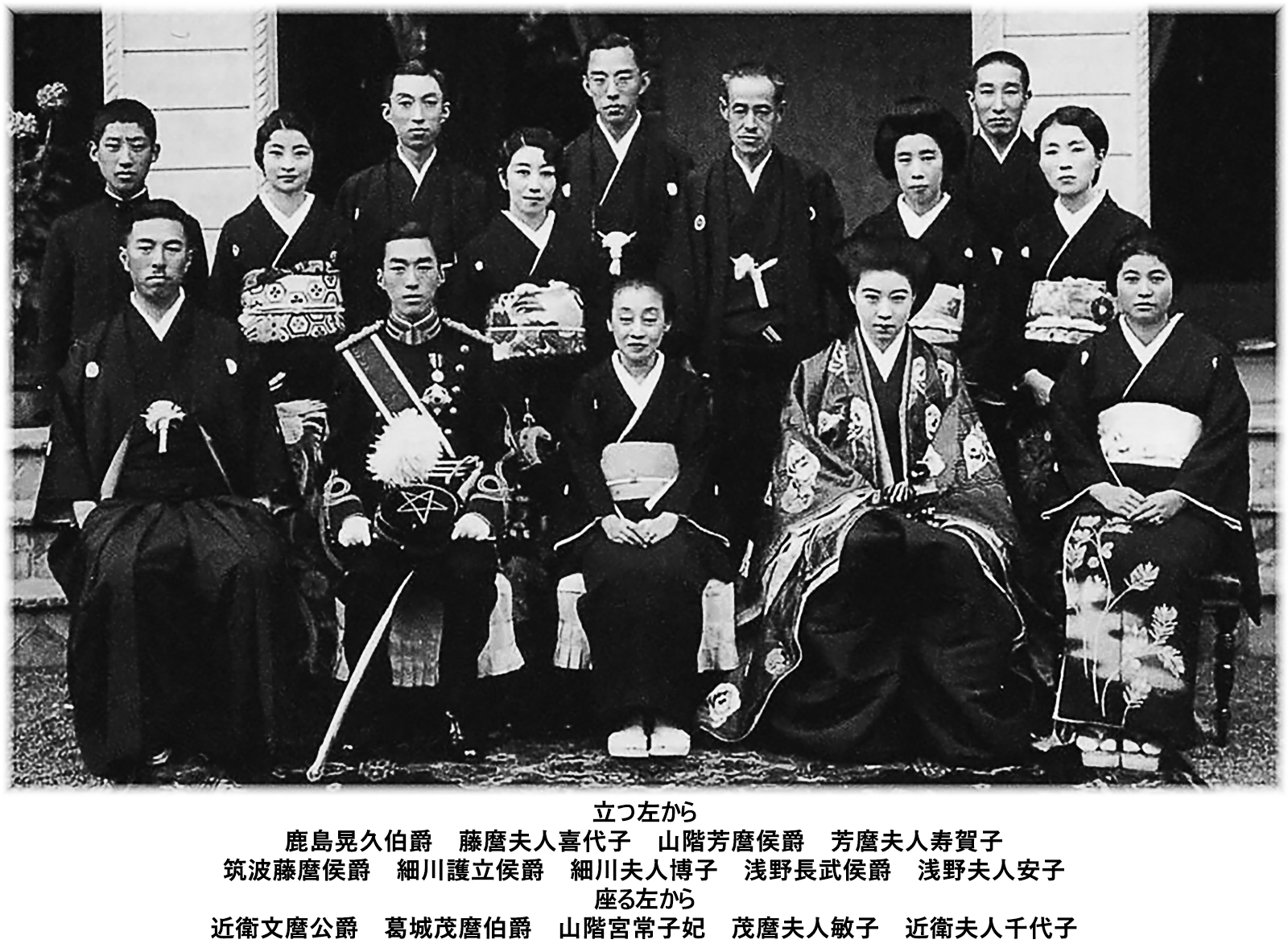
Group photo of Kazoku members, including Japan's prime minister before the Pacific War, Fumimaro Konoe (1st row, far left)

As in the British peerage, only the actual holder of a title and his consort were considered members of the kazoku. The holders of the top two ranks, prince and marquess, automatically became members of the House of Peers in the Diet of Japan upon their succession or upon majority (in the case of peers who were minors). Counts, viscounts and barons elected up to 150 representatives from their ranks to sit in the House of Peers.

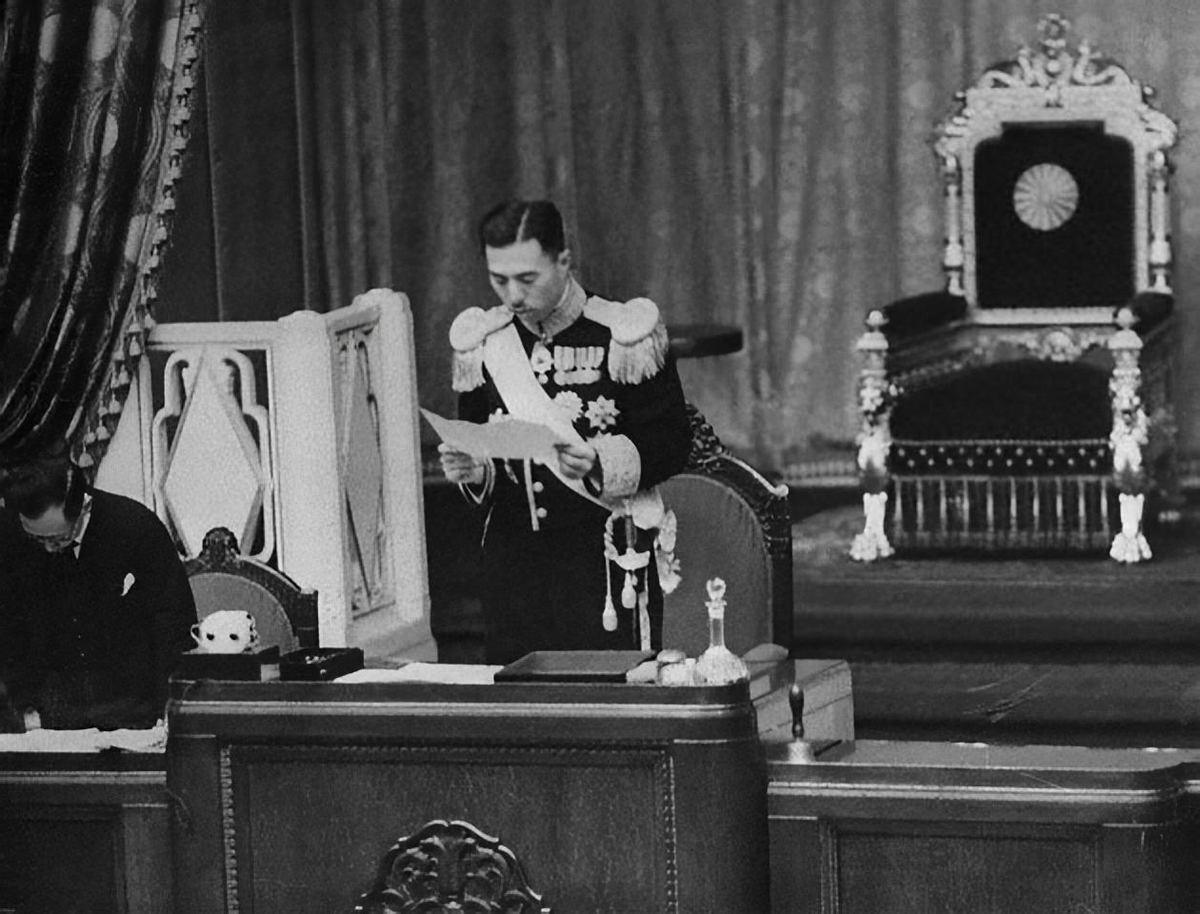
Prince Konoe reading an imperial rescript as President of the House of Peers, 1936

Under the Peerage Act of 7 July 1884, pushed through by Home Minister and future first Prime Minister Itō Hirobumi after visiting Europe, the Meiji government expanded the hereditary peerage with the award of kazoku status to persons regarded as having performed distinguished public services to the nation. The government also divided the kazoku into five ranks explicitly based on the British peerage, but with titles deriving from the ancient Chinese nobility.

Usually, though not always, titles and hereditary financial stipends passed according to primogeniture. Unlike in European peerage systems, but following traditional Japanese custom, illegitimate sons could succeed to titles and estates. To prevent their lineages from dying out, heads of kazoku houses could (and frequently did) adopt sons from collateral branches of their own houses, whether in the male or female lines of descent, and from other kazoku houses whether related or not.

Unlike European custom, the adopted heir of a peer could succeed to a title ahead of a more senior heir in terms of primogeniture. A 1904 amendment to the 1889 Imperial Household Law allowed minor princes (ō) of the imperial family to renounce their imperial status and become peers (in their own right) or heirs to childless peers.

Initially there were 11 non-imperial princes, 24 marquesses, 76 counts, 324 viscounts and 74 barons, for a total of 509 peers. By 1928, through promotions and new creations, there were a total of 954 peers: 18 non-imperial princes, 40 marquesses, 108 counts, 379 viscounts and 409 barons. The kazoku reached a peak of 1016 families in 1944.

The 1947 Constitution of Japan abolished the kazoku and ended the use of all titles of nobility or rank outside the immediate Imperial Family. Since the end of the war, many descendants of the kazoku families continue to occupy prominent roles in Japanese society and industry.

The Kazoku Kaikan (華族会館), or Peers' Club, was the association of the high nobility. It had its headquarters in the Rokumeikan building. After 1947 it was renamed the Kasumi Kaikan (霞会館), and is now located in the Kasumigaseki Building in Kasumigaseki.

== Life ==
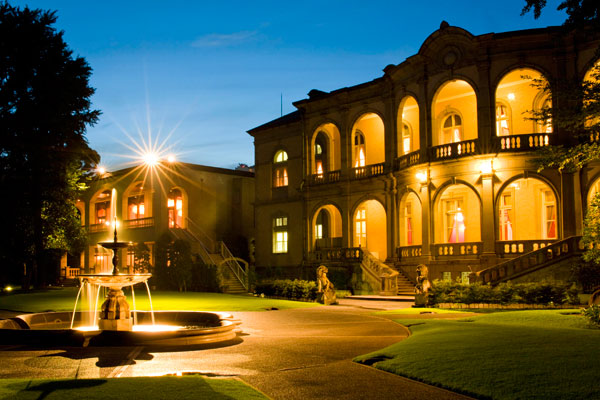
Guest house of the Mitsui Barony (Mita, Tokyo)

Although kazoku families were supposed to live in a style that matched their status, living standards varied significantly from family to family. Kuge families, long having been seen as a spent force since the samurai class became the de facto ruling class in the 11th century, tended to be significantly worse off than daimyo families. The Nara kazoku (奈良華族), consisting of 26 monk families from Kofukuji, who descended from kuge families (22 of which belonged to the Fujiwara clan), were all made barons under the kazoku system. They were regarded as the poorest and received extra stipends to support their living. A 1915 survey found that a kazoku family had around 13 servants on average, while the grandest families had hundreds.

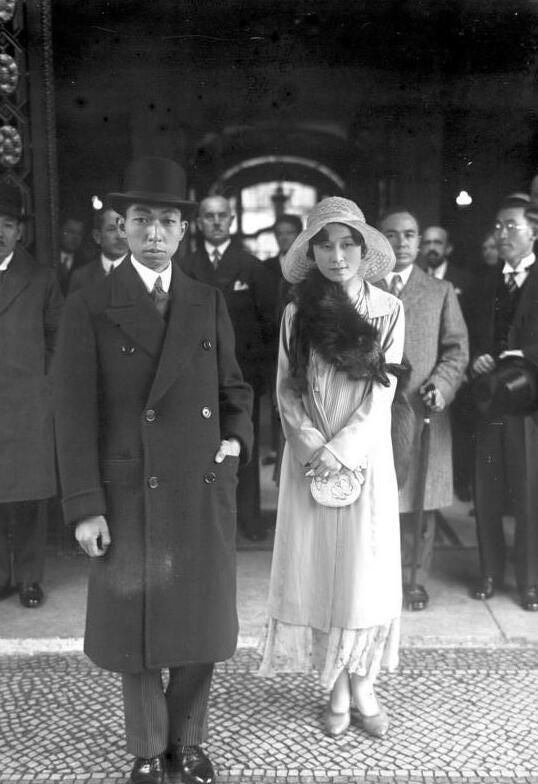
Prince and Princess Takamatsu at the entrance of Hotel Adlon in 1930

Almost all kazoku heirs raised in Japan attended the Gakushuin for their primary and secondary education. For higher education, the most preferred institutions included the University of Tokyo (called Tokyo Imperial University 1897-1947) (e.g., Prince Iemasa Tokugawa, Count Yoriyasu Arima) and the naval and army academies (e.g., Viscount Naganari Ogasawara, Marquess Toshinari Maeda). Some opted to be educated overseas, such as at Eton College (e.g., Prince Iesato Tokugawa) and Cambridge University (e.g., Marquess Masauji Hachisuka, Baron Koayata Iwasaki). After completing their education, they pursued varied careers such as statesmen at the House of Peers, diplomats (e.g., Prince Iemasa Tokugawa, Marquess Naohiro Nabeshima), and scholars (e.g., Marquess Yoshichika Tokugawa, Prince Tomohide Iwakura). Those who followed rather unusual career paths included Marquess Hijikata Yoshi, who became a communist and fled to Soviet Russia, and Meiho Ogasawara, an heir to a viscountcy who pursued his passion for films and was disinherited in 1935.

Kazoku usually married within their class. The Imperial Household Law of 1889 prohibited Imperial Princes from marrying commoners, hence their options were limited to Princesses and daughters of kazoku families. Kazoku daughters who married into the Imperial family include Kikuko, Princess Takamatsu (née Tokugawa), Yuriko, Princess Mikasa (née Takagi), and Setsuko, Princess Chichibu (née Matsudaira).

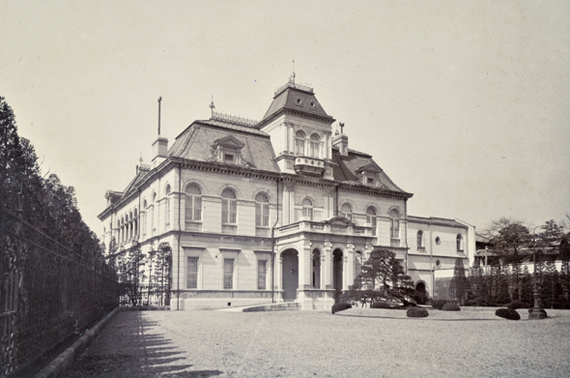
Tokyo house of Marquess Naohiro Nabeshima

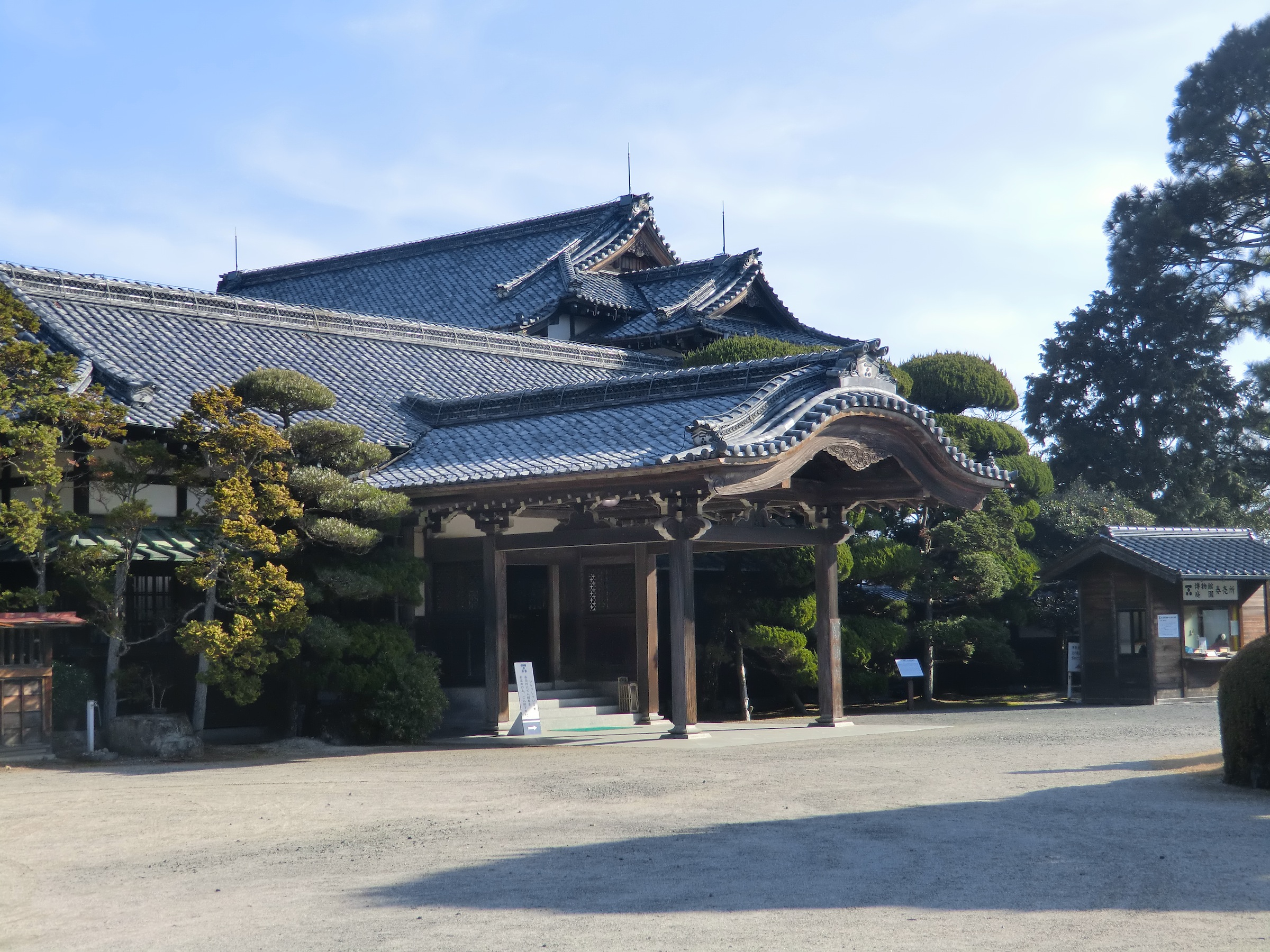
Former Hōfu country house of Viscount Mototoshi Mori (now Mori Museum)

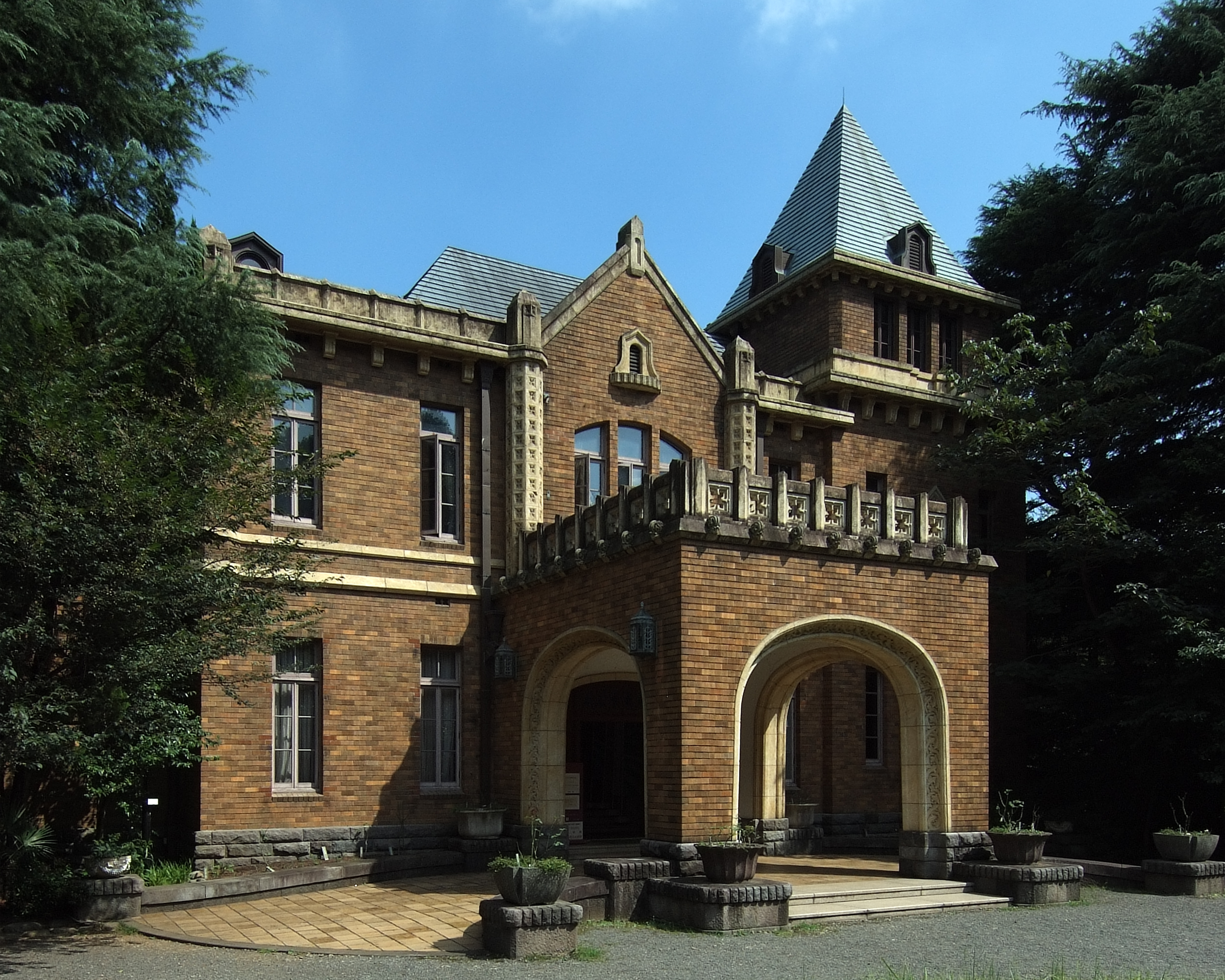
Former Tokyo residence of Marquess Toshinari Maeda (now Komaba Park)

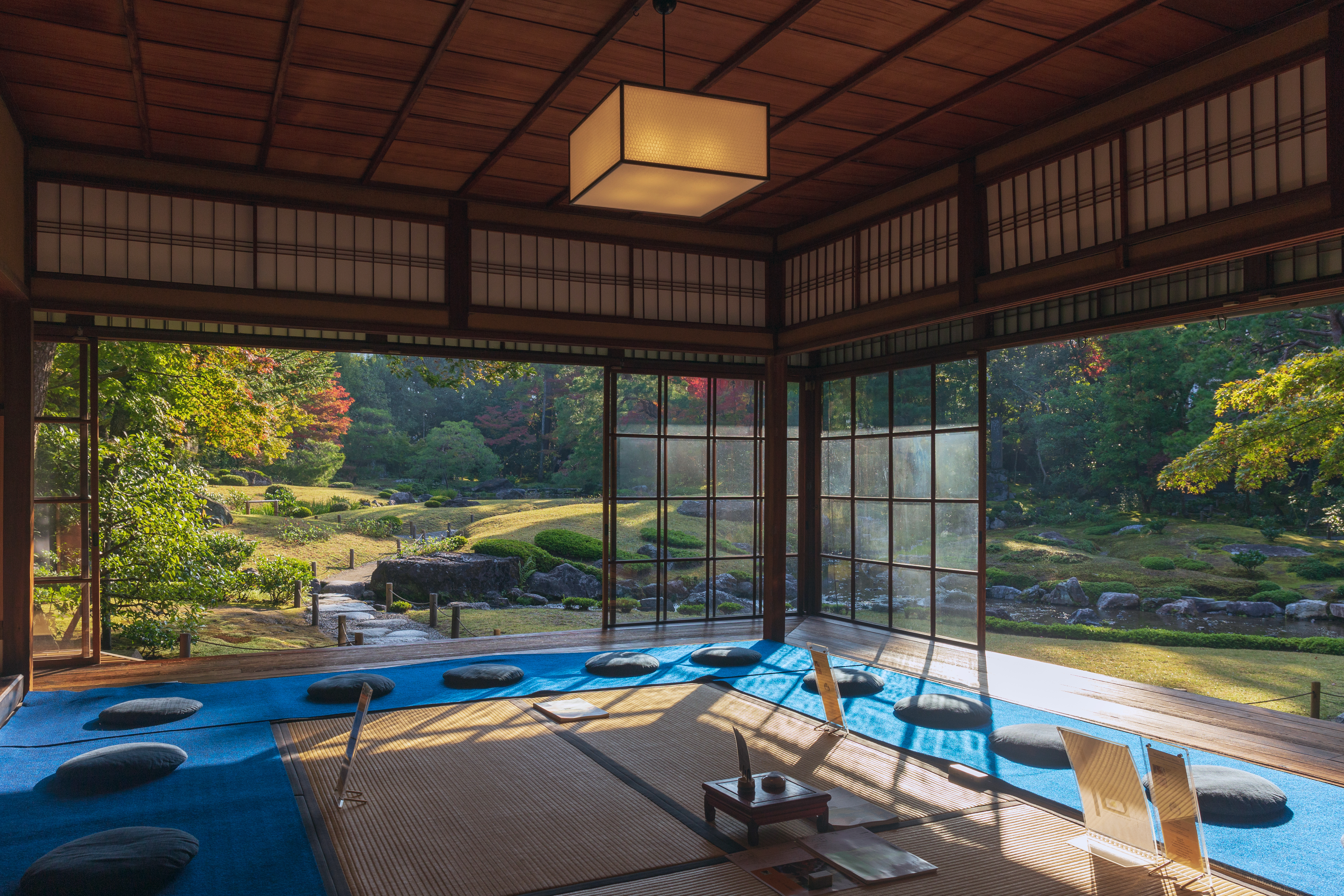
Former Kyoto residence of Prince Aritomo Yamagata (now Murin-an)

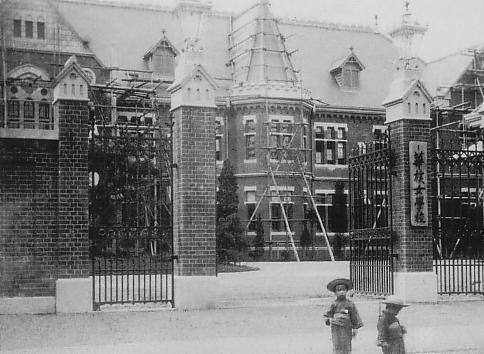
Kazoku Girls' School (Gakushuin Girls' School) in 1889

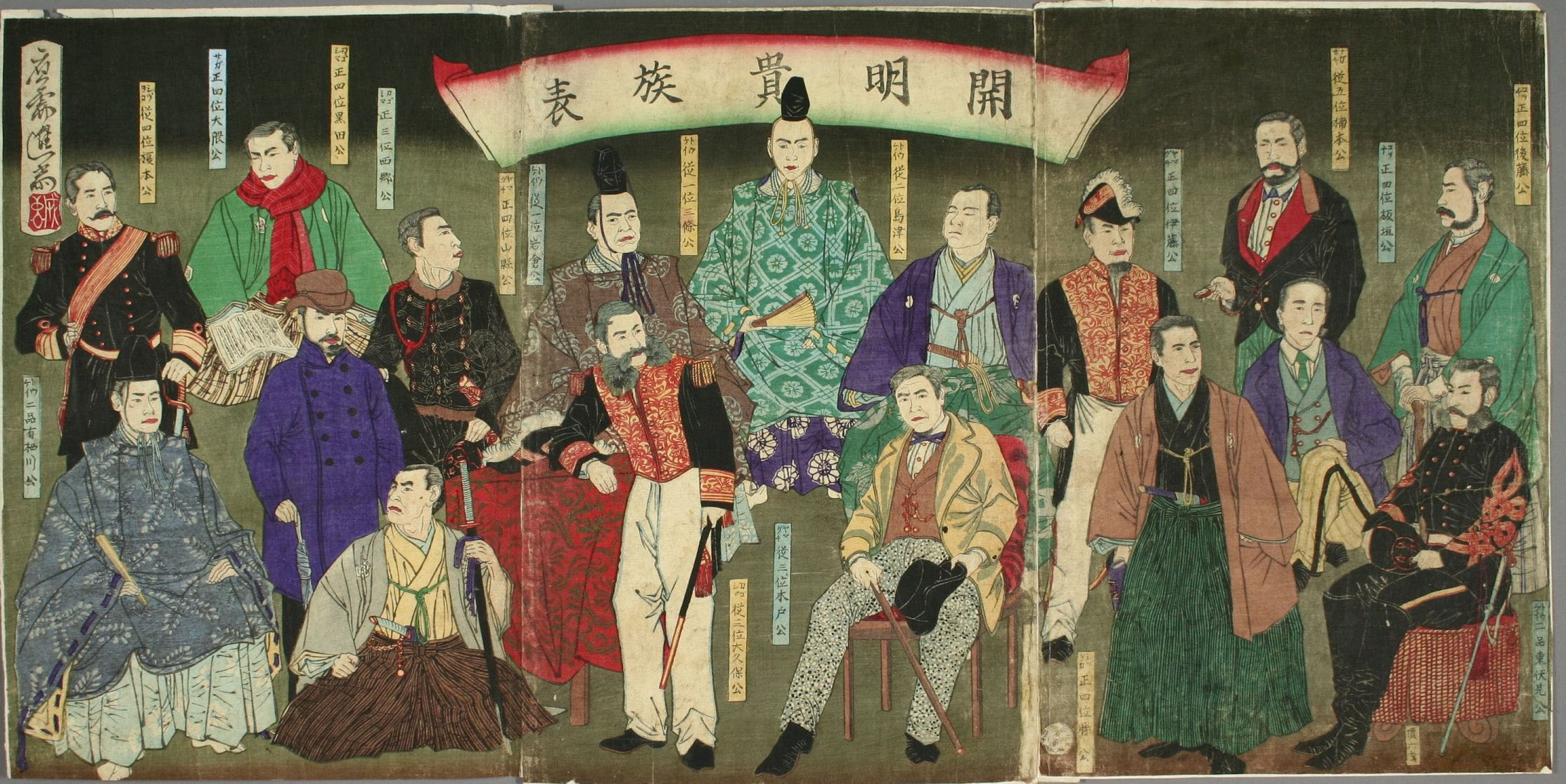
Woodblock print of "Enlightened Nobles", depicting prominent noble politicians and military commanders of the Meiji era, 1877

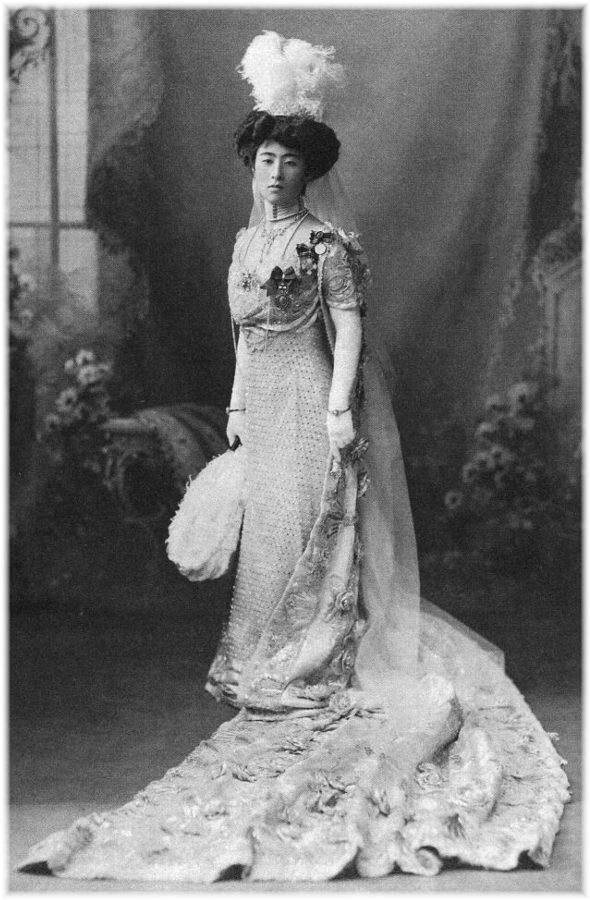
Itsuko, Princess of Nashimoto (née Nabeshima)

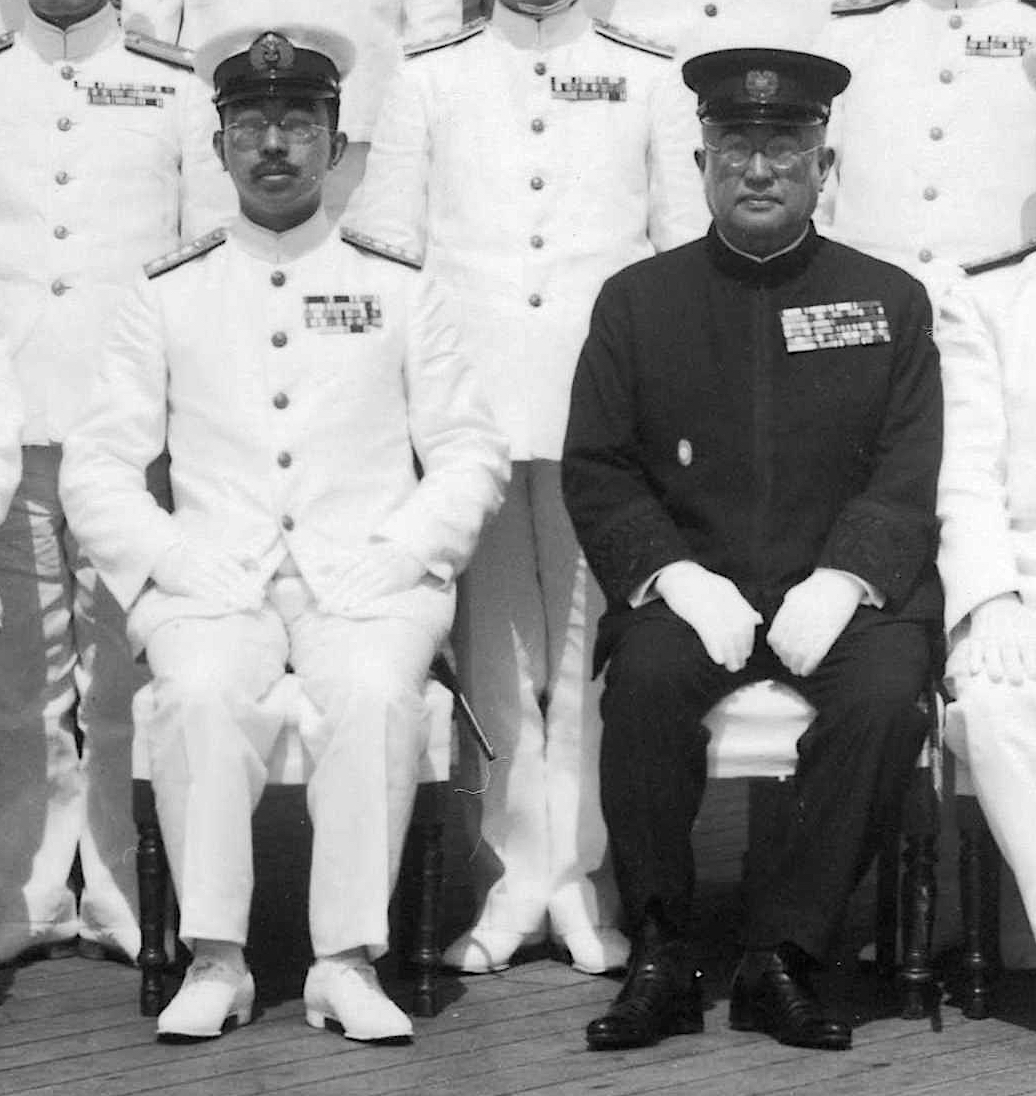
Tsuneo Matsudaira and Emperor Hirohito on Musashi

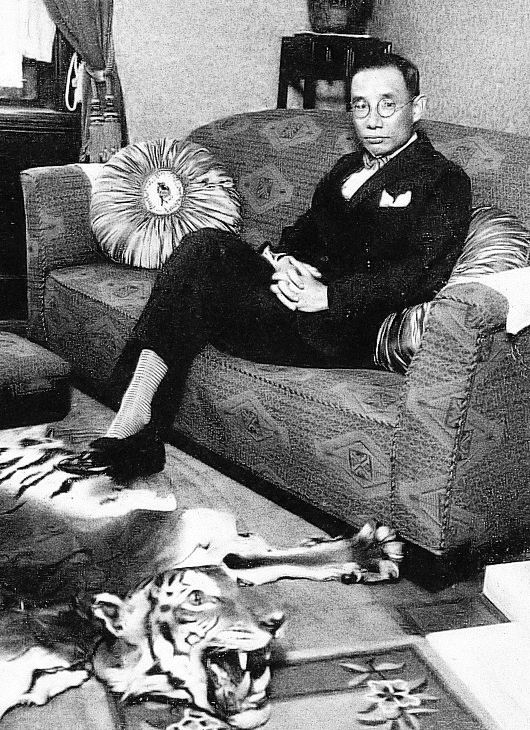
Marquess Yoshichika Tokugawa with a tiger he hunted in Malaya

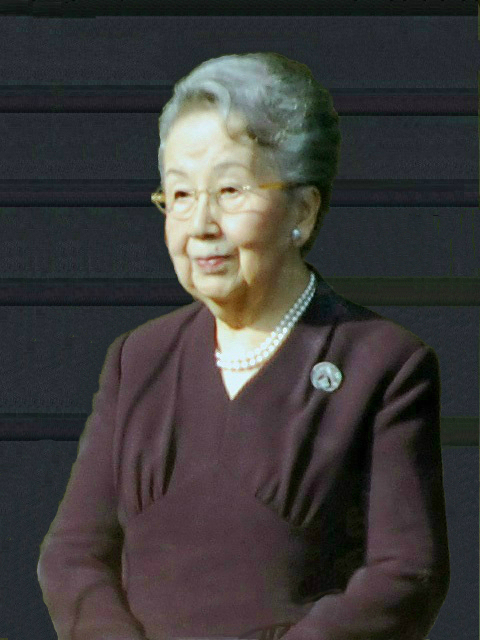
Yuriko, Princess Mikasa, one of the last members of the Imperial family who were born as kazoku

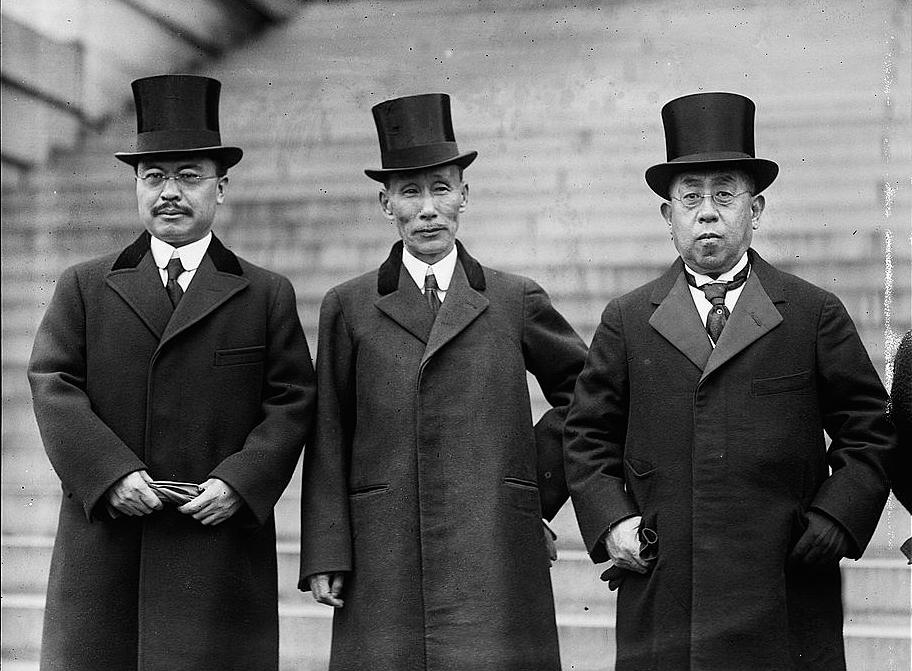
Baron Kijuro Shidehara (later Prime Minister), Viscount Tomosaburo Kato and Prince Iesato Tokugawa at Washington Naval Conference

== See also ==
- Monbatsu
