= Monbatsu =

Japanese term

Monbatsu (門閥) is the Japanese language term for the old Japanese aristocracy and nobility. The daimyō system was abolished with the Meiji Restoration. This did not, however, dismantle all the aspects of the clan system, nor achieve a thorough land reform. The Monbatsu persisted as a recognised block having political influence, into the twenty-first century.

== See also ==
- Gunbatsu
- Zaibatsu
- Kazoku
