= Kira clan =

Kira clan 吉良氏
- Mon of Kira clan
- Home province: Mikawa
- Parent house: Ashikaga clan
- Titles: Kōke
- Founder: Kira Mitsuuji (Ashikaga Mitsuuji)

The Kira clan (吉良氏 - kira-shi) was a Japanese clan, descended from Emperor Seiwa (850–880), and was a cadet branch of the Ashikaga family from the Minamoto clan (Seiwa Genji). Ashikaga Mitsuuji, grandson of Ashikaga Yoshiuji (1189–1254) was the first to take the name of Kira.

== Overview ==
The name originates from the Kamakura period, when Nagauji, the eldest illegitimate son of Ashikaga Yoshiuji, head of the Seiwa Genji Ashikaga clan, adopted the name Kira-sho in Mikawa Province, where he served as a land steward. Nagauji's younger brother, Yoshitsugu, gave rise to the Oshu Kira clan (later the Musashi Kira clan). The Mikawa Kira clan split into the Saijo Kira clan and the Tojo Kira clan during the Nanboku-chō period.

Kira Sadayoshi, a grandson of Nagauji, assisted Ashikaga Takauji in his campaign against the Kamakura shogunate's Rokuhara Tandai, and Sadayoshi's son, Mitsuyoshi, held the position of head of the Inketsu clan in the Muromachi shogunate . The Mikawa Kira clan held a high status among the numerous Ashikaga clans throughout Japan, and in the Muromachi shogunate, they were ranked as the head of the Ashikaga Gosanke (the three main families of the Ashikaga clan, also known as the Ashikaga Goikka, along with the Shibukawa and Ishibashi clans), who were treated second only to the Ashikaga shogun.

It was commonly said that "if the Gosho (shogun) dies out, the Kira clan will succeed, and if the Kira clan dies out, the Imagawa clan will succeed," and the Kira clan held a higher status and prestige than the three Kanrei families (the Shiba, Hosokawa, and Hatakeyama clans), also members of the Ashikaga clan. However, this limited the Kira clan's involvement in shogunate politics and its role as Shugo daimyo, restricting their ability to form hereditary territories.

During the Sengoku period, both the Mikawa and Musashi branches maintained a small degree of influence based on their original territories. While the Mikawa Kira of Saijo participated in the Mikawa Ikko Ikki uprising and perished in the late Sengoku period, the Tojo Mikawa Kira and the Oshu Kira ( Makita clan) continued their family name into the Edo period. The Mikawa Kira clan held 4,200 koku, and the Makita clan 1,420 koku, and became shogunate officials under the Edo shogunate. However, the former was stripped of its surname due to the Ako Incident (Chushingura) in which its head, Kira Yoshinaka (Kira Kozukenosuke), was involved. The Makita clan later reverted to the Kira surname, and later the Tojo clan (500 koku), a hatamoto branch of the Mikawa Kira clan, also reverted to the Kira surname. These two families continued until the Meiji Restoration, after which both families became samurai. The fate of the latter after the death of Kira Yoshimichi in 1912 is unknown.

In addition to the Kira clan of the Ashikaga clan mentioned above, there are also Tosa Kira clans such as the Tameyoshi line of the Seiwa Genji.

== Sources ==
- Saito Shigeru (1975), 赤穂義士実纂 [Authentic Account of the Akō Loyal Retainers] (in Japanese), Akō Gishi Jissan Hanpukai
- Taniguchi, Yūta (2019). 戦国期における三河吉良氏の動向 [The Activities of the Mikawa-Kira Clan During the Sengoku Period]. In Yoshikawa Kōbunkan (ed.). 中世足利氏の血統と権威 [Lineage and Authority of the Medieval Ashikaga Cla] (in Japanese). pp. 38–62. ISBN 9784642029582. (Originally published in *Sengokushi Kenkyū* [Journal of Sengoku History Studies], No. 66, 2013.)
