= Ashikaga clan (Fujiwara) =

Japanese clan, branch of Fujiwara clan

Ashikaga clan 足利氏
- Home province: Shimotsuke
- Parent house: Fujiwara clan
- Titles: Various
- Founder: Fujiwara no Hidesato
- Cadet branches: Yūki clan Oyama clan Shimokōbe clan Koyama clan Sano clan Ōgo clan Asonuma clan

The Ashikaga clan (足利氏, -shi) was a branch family of the Japanese Fujiwara clan of court nobles, more specifically Fujiwara no Hidesato of the Northern Fujiwara branch. The clan was a powerful force in the Kantō region during the Heian period (794–1185). It bore no direct relation to the samurai Ashikaga clan which ruled Japan under the Ashikaga shogunate from 1333 to 1587 and which was descended from the Minamoto clan.

== History ==
The clan was based in the city of Ashikaga, in Shimotsuke province, over which Fujiwara no Hidesato was Imperial Governor (kami). Ashikaga no Nariyuki was the first to take the Ashikaga name, after the city.

In 1161, the position of jitō (manor lord) of Ashikaga city in Shimotsuke province came to be disputed between the Koyama clan, descendants of Fujiwara no Hidesato, and Utsunomiya Ietsuna, a member of the Shiroi Utsunomiya clan, also descended from the Fujiwara, whose son Toshitsuna controlled several thousand hectares of land in that area. The dispute eventually ended in Hidesato's descendants being granted the post of shugo (shogunal governor) in the northern Kantō. The area soon came to be in dispute once again, between the Minamoto-descended Ashikaga clan (who took their name from the same city) and the Nitta clan, but this dispute ended when both clans, along with the Utsunomiya, joined Minamoto no Yoritomo in the Genpei War (1180–1185) against the Taira clan.

Following the Genpei War, Yoritomo established the Kamakura shogunate, and the descendants of Ashikaga no Nariyuki, now known as the Sano, Ōgo, and Asonuma families, came to serve as direct vassals (gokenin) to the shōgun.

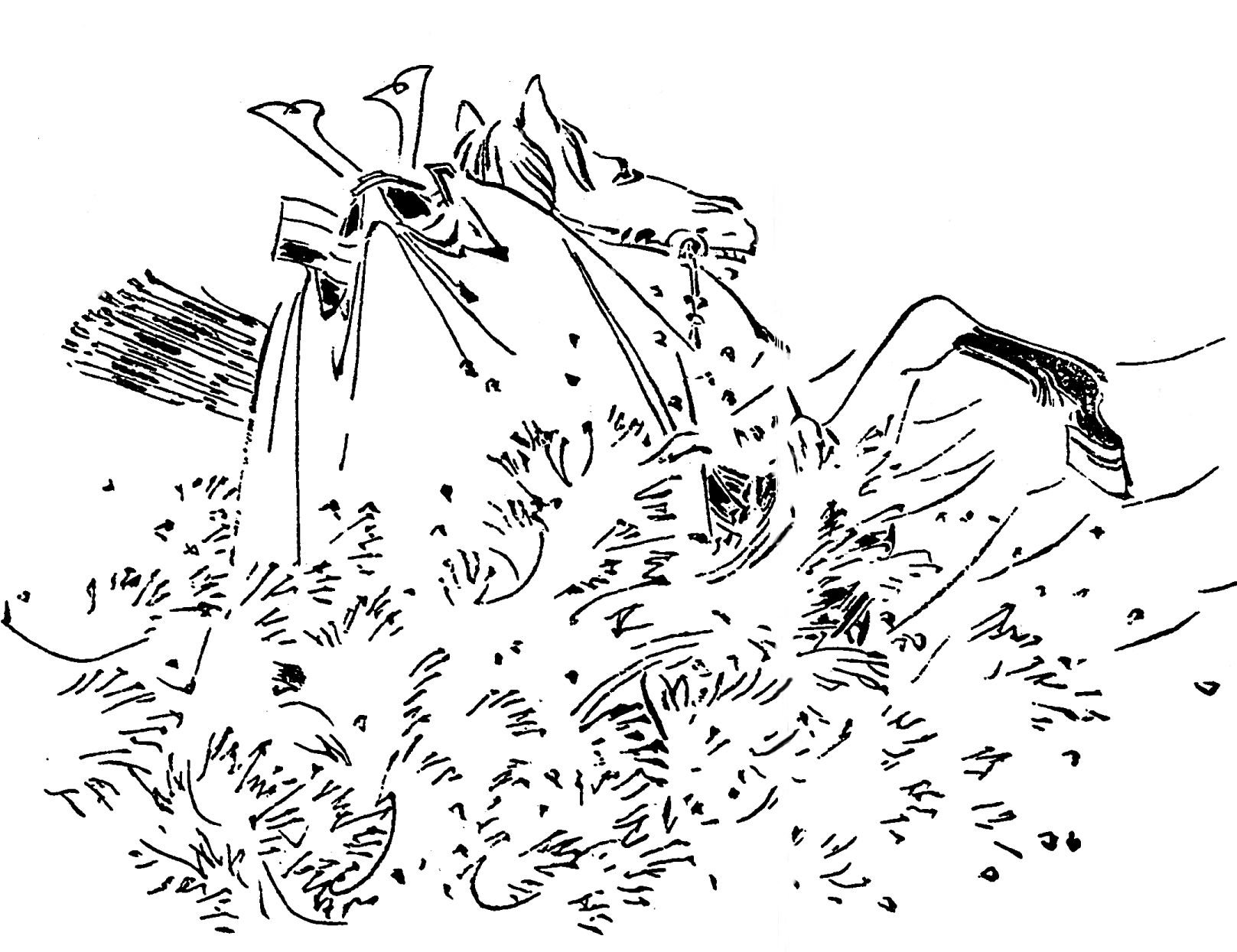
Ashikaga Tadatsuna

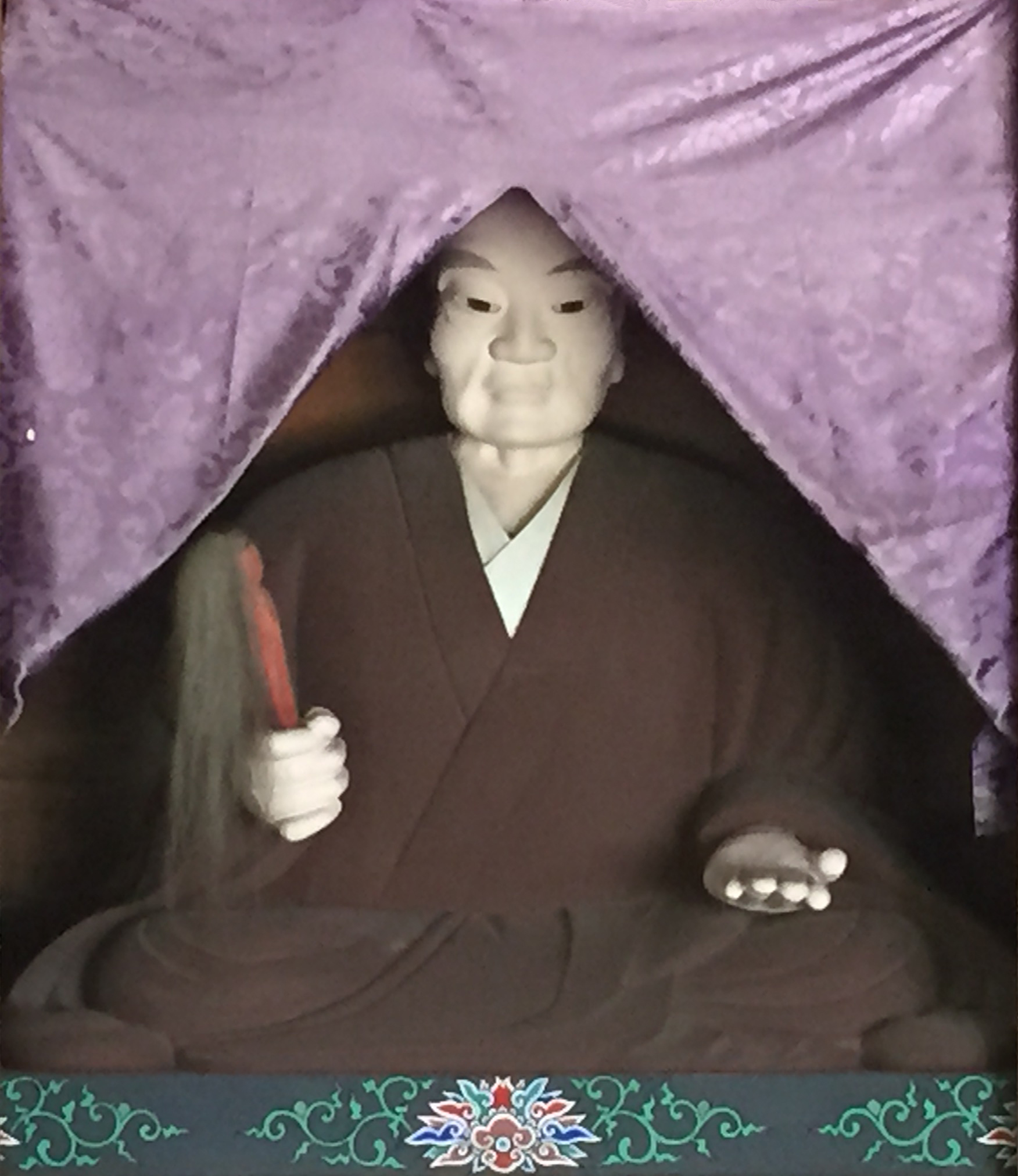
Heyako Aritsuna (Ashikaga Aritsuna)
