= Akira (given name) =

- Gender: Unisex, but predominantly male
- Language: Japanese

Origin
- Meaning: many meanings depending on the kanji used

Other names
- See also: Akiko

Akira (あきら, アキラ) is a given name present in a few languages. It is a unisex, but predominantly male Japanese given name. There are several kanji for Akira.

== Written forms ==
In Japanese there are many alternative ways to write the name Akira in kanji. This is not an exhaustive list. A popular kanji is 明 (the combination of the two different characters 日 = sun and 月 = moon) which means "the light coming from the sun", "sunlight and moonlight", "bright", "intelligent", "wisdom" or "truth". Though Akira is generally used to name males, sometimes it can be a female name as well.

- 明, "bright"
- 亮, "light"
- 昭, "shining"
- 光, "light"
- 昌, "prosper"
- 晃, "clear"
- 彰, "acknowledge"
- 朗, "clear/bright"
- 晶, "sparkle"
- 哲, "intelligent/philosophy/clear"
- 章, "chapter/section"
- 旭, "rising sun"
- 顕, "exposure/clarity"
- 彬, "refined/gentle"
- 明楽, "bright, ease"
- 秋良, "autumn, good"
- 了, "completion"
- 安喜良, "calm, joy, good"
- 亜紀良, "asia, chronicle, good"
- 日日日, "day, day, day"
- 彬良, "refined/gentle, good"
- 明良, "bright, good"
- 旦, "morning/dawn"

== People with the name ==
- Akira Aizawa (相澤晃; born 1997), Japanese long-distance runner
- Akira Akao (赤尾 公; born 1988), Japanese footballer
- Akira Akatsuki (暁月 あきら; born 1977), Japanese manga artist
- Akira Amano (天野 明; born 1973), Japanese manga artist
- Akira Amari (甘利 明; born 1949), Japanese politician
- Akira Ando (安東 輝; born 1995), Japanese footballer
- Akira Aoyama (青山士; 1878–1963), Japanese civil engineer
- Akira Arimura (有村 章; 1923–2007), Japanese endocrinologist, biochemist, physiologist, and professor
- Akira Asada (浅田 彰; born 1957), Japanese art critic and curator
- Akira Asahara (浅原 晃), Japanese Magic: The Gathering player
- Akira Back (born 1974), Korean-American chef
- Akira Chen (born 1969), Taiwanese actor and film director
- Akira Chiba (born 1959), Japanese businessman
- Akira Corassani (born 1982), Iranian-Swedish mixed martial artist
- Akira Silvano Disaro (ディサロ 燦 シルヴァーノ; born 1996), Japanese footballer
- Akira Eguchi, Japanese pianist
- Akira Ejiri (江尻 亮; born 1943), Japanese baseball player
- Akira Emoto (柄本 明; born 1948), Japanese actor
- Akira Endo (遠藤 章; 1933–2024), Japanese biochemist
- Akira Endo (遠藤 明; 1938–2014), Japanese-American conductor and music educator
- Akira Eto (江藤 智; born 1970), Japanese baseball player
- Akira Fantini (ファンティーニ 燦; born 1998), Japanese football goalkeeper
- Akira Fitzgerald (フィッツジェラルド・アキラ; born 1987), Japanese football goalkeeper
- Akira Fujii (藤井 旭; 1941–2022), Japanese astrophotographer and astronomer
- Akira Fujishima (藤嶋 昭; born 1942), Japanese chemist and university president
- Akira Fujita (藤田 明; 1908–2001), Japanese water polo player
- Akira Fujiwara (藤原 彰; 1922–2003), Japanese historian
- Akira Furuya (古谷 彰), Japanese anime art director
- Akira Fuse (布施 明; born 1947), Japanese singer and actor
- Akira Gomi (五味 彬; born 1953), Japanese photographer
- Akira Gunji (郡司 彰; born 1949), Japanese politician
- Akira Hagiwara (萩原 光; 1956–1986), Japanese racing driver
- Akira Hamashita (浜下瑛; born 1995), Japanese footballer
- Akira Haraguchi (原口 證; born 1946), Japanese mental health counsellor
- Akira Hasegawa (長谷川晃; 1934–2025), Japanese theoretical physicist and engineer
- Akira Hatano (秦野 章; 1911–2002), Japanese politician
- Akira Hayami (速水融; 1929–2019), Japanese historian and professor
- Hayashi Akira (林 韑; 1800–1859), Japanese scholar and diplomat
- Akira Hayashi (林 享; born 1974), Japanese swimmer
- Akira Higashi (東 輝; born 1972), Japanese ski jumper
- Akira Himekawa, pen name used by a Japanese duo of manga artists
- Akira Hiramoto (平本 アキラ; born 1976), Japanese manga artist
- Akira Hirose, Japanese engineer
- Akira Hokuto (佐々木 久子; born 1967), Japanese wrestler
- Akira Hori (堀晃; born 1944), Japanese science fiction writer
- Akira Hosomi (1943–2018), Japanese chemist
- Akira Hyodo (兵頭彰; born 1995), Japanese wrestler
- Akira Ibayashi (井林 章; born 1990), Japanese footballer
- Akira Ifukube (伊福部 昭; 1914–2006), Japanese composer of classical music and film scores
- Akira Iida (飯田 章; born 1969), Japanese racing driver
- Akira Inaba (稲葉 陽; born 1988), Japanese shogi player
- Akira Inoue (disambiguation), multiple people
- Akira Ioane (born 1995), New Zealand rugby player
- Akira Iriye (1934–2026), Japanese-born American historian of American diplomatic history
- Akira Ishibashi (石橋 顕; born 1973), Japanese sailor
- Akira Ishida (石田 彰; born 1967), Japanese voice actor
- Akira Ishimaru (アキラ 石丸; 1928–2025), Japanese-American electrical engineer and academic
- Akira Isogawa (五十川 明; born 1964), fashion designer
- Akira Ito (field hockey) (伊藤 亮; born 1981), hockey player
- Akira Itō (manga artist) (伊藤 彰), Japanese manga artist
- Akira Jimbo (神保 彰; born 1959), Japanese jazz fusion drummer
- Akira Kaji (加地 亮; born 1980), Japanese football player
- Akira Kamiya (神谷 明; born 1946), Japanese voice actor
- Akira Kanbe (かんべ あきら), Japanese manga artist
- Akira Kawashima (川島 明; born 1979), Japanese comedian, television personality and actor
- Akira Kobayashi (小林 旭; born 1938), Japanese actor and singer
- Akira Kodama (小玉 晃; born 1944), Japanese basketball player
- Akira Komoto (小本 章; born 1935), Japanese artist
- Akira Kurabayashi (倉林 晶; 1969/1970–2026), Japanese video game designer
- Akira Kurosawa (黒澤 明; 1910–1998), Japanese film director, producer, and screenwriter
- Akira Machida (町田 顯; 1936–2015), head of the Japanese Supreme Court
- Akira Maeda (前田 日明; born 1959), wrestler
- Akira Masuda (増田 章; born 1962), Japanese karate practitioner
- Akira Mitake (見岳 章; born 1956), Japanese composer
- Akira Mikazuki (三ヶ月 章; 1921–2010), Japanese scholar and politician
- Akira Morishita (森下 晃; born 2001), Filipino-Japanese actor and singer
- Akira Mutō (武藤 章; 1892–1948), general in the Imperial Japanese Army
- Akira Nakaura (中浦 章; born 1935), Japanese sport wrestler
- Akira Narahashi (名良橋 晃; born 1971), Japanese football defender
- Akira Narita (born 1945), Japanese manga artist
- Akira Nishitani (西谷 亮; born 1967), Japanese video game designer
- Akira Nishio (西尾 明; born 1979), Japanese shogi player
- Akira Nogami (野上 彰; born 1968), Japanese professional wrestler
- Akira Raijin (雷陣 明) or Akira Kawabata (川畑 顕) (born 1978), Japanese professional wrestler
- Akira Sakata (坂田 明; born 1945), Japanese free jazz saxophonist
- Akira Sasaki (佐々木 明; born 1981), Japanese alpine skier
- Akira Sasanuma (笹沼 尭羅; born 1973), Japanese voice actor
- Akira Satō (photographer) (佐藤 明; 1930–2002), Japanese photographer
- Akira Satō (ski jumper) (佐藤 晃; born 1964), Japanese ski jumper
- Akira Schmid (born 2000), Swiss ice hockey player
- Akira Sekine (関根 明良), Japanese voice actress
- Akira Senju (千住 明; born 1960), Japanese composer
- Akira Shima (島 朗; born 1963), Japanese shogi player
- Akira Shoji (小路 晃; born 1974), Japanese professional mixed martial artist
- Akira Suzuki (disambiguation), multiple people
- Akira Takabe (高部 聖; born 1982), Japanese footballer
- Akira Takano, a member of Dream5
- Akira Takarada (宝田 明; 1934–2022), Japanese actor
- Akira Takasaki (高崎 晃; born 1961), heavy metal guitarist
- Akira Takayasu (髙安 晃; born 1990), Japanese sumo wrestler
- Akira Takeuchi (disambiguation), multiple people
- Akira Tamura (田村 明; 1926–2010), Japanese city planner
- Akira Taue (田上 明; born 1961), Japanese professional wrestler
- Akira Terao (寺尾 聰; born 1947), entertainer
- Akira Tomii (富井 周; 1890–1959), Japanese diplomat
- Akira Toriyama (ophthalmologist) (鳥山 晃; 1898–1994), Japanese ophthalmologist and photographer
- Akira Toriyama (鳥山 明; 1955–2024), Japanese manga artist and character designer
- Akira Tozawa (戸澤 陽; born 1985), Japanese professional wrestler
- Akira Watanabe (disambiguation), multiple people
- Akira Yaegashi (八重樫 東; born 1983), Japanese professional boxer
- Akira Yamada (山田 晶; 1922–2008), Japanese philosopher
- Akira Yamagishi (山岸 章; 1929–2016), Japanese trade unionist
- Akira Yamaguchi (山口 晃; born 1969), Japanese artist
- Akira Yamamoto (山本 旭; 1913–1944), Japanese World War II flying ace
- Akira Yamaoka (山岡 晃; born 1968), Japanese composer and music producer
- Akira Yanase (柳瀬 彰良; born 1988), Japanese water polo player
- Akira Yoshida (吉田 明; born 1971), Japanese rugby union player
- Akira Yoshino (吉野 彰; born 1948), Japanese chemist
- Akira Yoshizawa (吉澤 章; 1911–2005), Japanese origamist

== Fictional characters ==
- Akira (Akira), the title character of Akira
- Akira, a character in the video game Shin Megami Tensei IV
- Akira, a character in the anime and manga Samurai Deeper Kyo
- Akira, a character in the manga Dengeki Daisy
- Akira, the main protagonist in the BL visual novel Togainu no Chi
- Akira (Blue Mask), a character in Hikari Sentai Maskman
- Akira Agarkar Yamada, a character in Tsuritama media
- Akira Akao, a character in the manga Sakamoto Days
- Akira Akebono, a character in the anime Daigunder
- Akira Amami, a character in Kamen Rider Hibiki
- Akira Asaba (麻羽 央), a character in Magical Trans!
- Akira Asai, a character from Call of the Night
- Akira Fudo, the main character in Devilman
- Akira Fujiwara, a character in Ojamajo Doremi
- Akira Gotō, a character in the multimedia project Ikizulive! Love Live! Bluebird
- Akira Hayama, a character in the manga Food Wars!: Shokugeki no Soma
- Akira Himegami, the main protagonist of Dusk Beyond the End of the World
- Akira Himi (a.k.a. Aqua Current), a character in the light novel Accel World
- Akira Hojo, a character in Sanctuary
- Akira Howard, the twin of the main protagonist in Astral Chain
- Akira Inugami (aka Wolf), a character in the manga Wolf Guy
- Akira Kaburagi Regendorf, the protagonist in the Dance in the Vampire Bund manga and its anime adaption
- Akira Kazama, a character in Rival Schools media
- Akira Kenjou (剣城 あきら), a character in the anime series Kirakira PreCure a la Mode
- Akira Kogami, a character in Lucky Star franchise
- Akira Kogane, a character in Voltron: Defender of the Universe, also known as Beast King GoLion (given name changed to 'Keith' for the US adaptations)
- Akira Konoe, an antagonist in Persona 5 Strikers
- Akira Kunimi (国見 英), a character from Haikyu!! with the position of wing spiker for Aoba Johsai High
- Akira Kurosawa, a character in The Simpsons media
- Akira Kurusu, the protagonist's name in the manga adaptation of Persona 5
- Akira Kusano, a character in Nobuta wo Produce media
- Akira Mado, a supporting character in the manga series Tokyo Ghoul
- Akira Midousuji (御堂筋 翔 Midōsuji Akira), a character in the manga and anime Yowamushi Pedal
- Akira Mimasaka, a character in Boys Over Flowers media
- Akira Momoi, a character in Denshi Sentai Denziman
- Akira Nijigaoka, a character in Soaring Sky! Pretty Cure
- Akira Nijino, a character from Ressha Sentai ToQger
- Akira Nishikiyama, an antagonist from the game series Yakuza
- Akira Oda, the main protagonist of My Status as an Assassin Obviously Exceeds the Hero's
- Akira Ogata, a supporting character in My Dress-Up Darling
- Akira Okochi, a character in Negima! Magister Negi Magi
- Akira Okudaira, a character in the manga Sweet Blue Flowers
- Akira Okuzaki, a character in My-HiME media
- Akira Otoishi, a minor antagonist in JoJo's Bizarre Adventure
- Akira Rai, a character in Jab Tak Hai Jaan
- Akira Renbokoji, a character in the anime Valvrave the Liberator
- Akira Satou, a character in Katawa Shoujo
- Akira Sendoh, a character in the manga Slam Dunk
- Akira Sengoku, the main character of the manga Cage of Eden
- Akira Shimotsuki, a supporting character in the manga series Missions of Love
- Akira Shiroyanagi, the main protagonist of Battle Game in 5 Seconds
- Akira Sohma, a character in Fruits Basket
- Akira Tachibana, a protagonist in the manga After the Rain
- Akira Tadokoro, one of the eight main protagonists of Live A Live
- Akira Takano (character), a character in School Rumble media
- Akira Takaoka, an antagonist in Assassination Classroom
- Akira Takizawa, the main character of the anime Eden of the East
- Akira Tendo, the main character of Zom 100: Bucket List of the Dead
- Akira Tōdō, a character from the manga series World's End Harem
- Akira Toudou, a character in S.A
- Akira Toya, a character in Hikaru no Go media
- Akira Udō, a character in Air Gear media
- Akira Yamabuki (Yamatoga in the English dub), a character from the anime series Beyblade Burst
- Akira Yuki, a character in the Virtua Fighter universe
- Akira Yukishiro, a character in the Revue Starlight franchise

== See also ==
- Akira (disambiguation)
