= Chul =

Chul (Persian: چول) may refer to:

- Chul (Korean name)
- Chul, Khuzestan
- Chul, Lorestan
- Chul, Ramshir, Khuzestan Province

== See also ==
- 哲 (disambiguation)
