= 哲 =

哲, meaning 'intelligent, philosophy, clear', may refer to:

- Akira, a masculine Japanese given name
- Chul, a Korean given name
- Satoru, a masculine Japanese given name
- Satoshi, a masculine Japanese given name
- Tetsu, a masculine Japanese given name
- Zhe, a masculine Chinese given name, see Zhe (disambiguation)#People

== See also ==
- Akira (disambiguation)
- Chul (disambiguation)
- Philosophy (disambiguation)
