= Zhe =

Zhe may refer to:

- Zhe (Cyrillic), a letter of the Cyrillic alphabet
- Zhe (Armenian letter)
- Maclura tricuspidata (or zhè), a tree native to East Asia
- Že, a letter of the Perso-Arabic alphabet
- Zhejiang, a province of China
  - Qiantang River, originally named the "Zhe River" or "Zhe Jiang", after which the province was named

== Schools ==
- Zhe school (guqin), a school of musicians for the guqin
- Zhe school (painting), painters of Southern School, which thrived during Ming dynasty of China

== People ==
- Viceroy of Min-Zhe, title of government official of China
- Chen Zhe (1993- ), a professional snooker player from Shanxi, China
- Feng Zhe (1987- ), a male Chinese gymnast
- Jiao Zhe, a Chinese footballer
- Li Zhe (disambiguation)
- Shi Zhe (1905-1998), a Chinese interpreter
- Song Zhe, a diplomat, ambassador of the People's Republic of China
- Su Zhe (1039-1112), a politician and essayist from Meishan, China
- Zou Zhe (1636-c.1708), noted Chinese painter during Quint well zhe is Russian.

== See also ==
- 哲 (disambiguation)
