= Takeuchi =

Takeuchi (Japanese: 竹内; "within bamboo" or Japanese: 武内; "warrior household") is a Japanese surname. It is common in west-central Japan, and is pronounced Takenouchi (Take-no-uchi) by some bearers. The family claims descent from the legendary hero-statesman Takenouchi-no-Sukune, himself supposedly a descendant of the mythical Emperor Kōgen and a counselor to several other emperors, including Emperor Ōjin (late 4th century). Other families such as the Soga clan also claim Takenouchi-no-Sukune as an ancestor. It can also be written as 竹野内.

The Takenouchi-ryū is a koryū tradition founded by Takenouchi Chūnagon Daijō Hisamori in 1532 and is still maintained today by his descendants.

== People with the surname ==
- Aina Takeuchi (竹内 愛奈, born 1991), Japanese ice hockey player
- Akari Takeuchi (竹内 朱莉, born 1997), Japanese singer and member of girl group S/mileage
- Akira Takeuchi (disambiguation), multiple people
- Atsushi Takenouchi (竹之内 淳志, born 1960), Japanese Butoh dancer
- Aya Takeuchi (竹内 亜弥, born 1986), Japanese rugby sevens player
- Esther Sans Takeuchi, materials scientist
- Gaisi Takeuti (竹内 外史, 1926–2017), Japanese mathematician
- Hiromi Takeuchi (竹内 洋美, born 1966), Japanese speed skater
- Hironori Takeuchi (竹内 浩典, born 1964), Japanese racing driver
- Hirotaka Takeuchi (竹内 弘高, born 1946), Japanese professor and knowledge-management author
- Junko Takeuchi (竹内 順子, born 1972), Japanese voice actress
- Kazuya Takeuchi (竹内 和也, born 1941), Japanese water polo player
- Marika Takeuchi (竹内 まりか, born 1987), Japanese contemporary composer
- Mariya Takeuchi (竹内 まりや, born 1955), Japanese singer and songwriter
- Minoru Takeuchi (竹内 実, born 1971), Japanese volleyball player
- Mio Takeuchi (竹内 実生, born 1985), Japanese actress
- Miyu Takeuchi (竹内 美宥, born 1996), Japanese singer and K-pop idol
- Motoaki Takenouchi (武内 基朗, born 1967), Japanese video game composer
- Naoko Takeuchi (武内 直子, born 1967), Japanese manga artist
- Riki Takeuchi (竹内 力, born 1964), an actor in the Dead or Alive series of films
- Ryūshin Takeuchi (竹内 龍臣, born 2001), Japanese baseball player
- Takeuchi Rizō (竹内 理三, 1907–1997), Japanese historian
- Shigeyo Takeuchi (竹内 茂代, 1881–1975), Japanese physician
- Shion Takeuchi (born 1988), American television writer and creator of the Netflix series Inside Job
- Shunsuke Takeuchi (武内 駿輔, born 1997), Japanese voice actor
- Tokio Takeuchi (竹内 時男, 1894–1944), Japanese physicist
- Yugo Takeuchi (竹内 雄悟, born 1987), Japanese shogi player
- Yukio Takeuchi (竹内 行夫, born 1943), Japanese Supreme Court justice
- Yūko Takeuchi (竹内 結子, 1980–2020), Japanese television actress
- Yutaka Takenouchi (竹野内 豊, born 1971), Japanese television actor
- Takenouchi Tōjūrō Hisatake, 13th sōdenke of Takenouchi-ryū
- Takenouchi Chūnagon Daijō Hisamori, founder of Takenouchi-ryū

== Fictional characters ==
- Sora Takenouchi, in the anime's Digimon Adventure and Digimon Adventure 02
- Sora Takeuchi, in the manga and anime Air Gear
- Momoko Takeuchi, in the manga Inubaka
- Rio Takeuchi, a character in the anime Spiral
- Takeuchi Tatsuru, (竹内多鹤) the heroine of the novel and TV drama Auntie Tatsuru (Chinese:小姨多鹤) by Chinese writer Yan Geling (Chinese:严歌苓)
- Itsuki Takeuchi, a character in the manga and anime Initial D

== See also ==
- Crest of the Takeuchi family, a stylized ume blossom
- Takeuchi Manufacturing, a Japanese heavy equipment manufacturer
- Tak, mathematical recursive function named after Ikuo Takeuchi (竹内郁雄)
- The Takeuchi Documents, texts in the Mahikari religious movement
