= Tamura =

Tamura (usually written 田村), a Japanese placename and family name, may refer to:

In places:

- Tamura, Fukushima, a city in Japan
- Tamura District, Fukushima, in Japan
- Tamura Station, in Nagahama, Japan

People with the surname Tamura:

- Tamura (surname)
- Tamura clan, a Japanese samurai clan
