= Tetsu (restaurant) =

Coordinates: 40.717349°N 74.005296°W

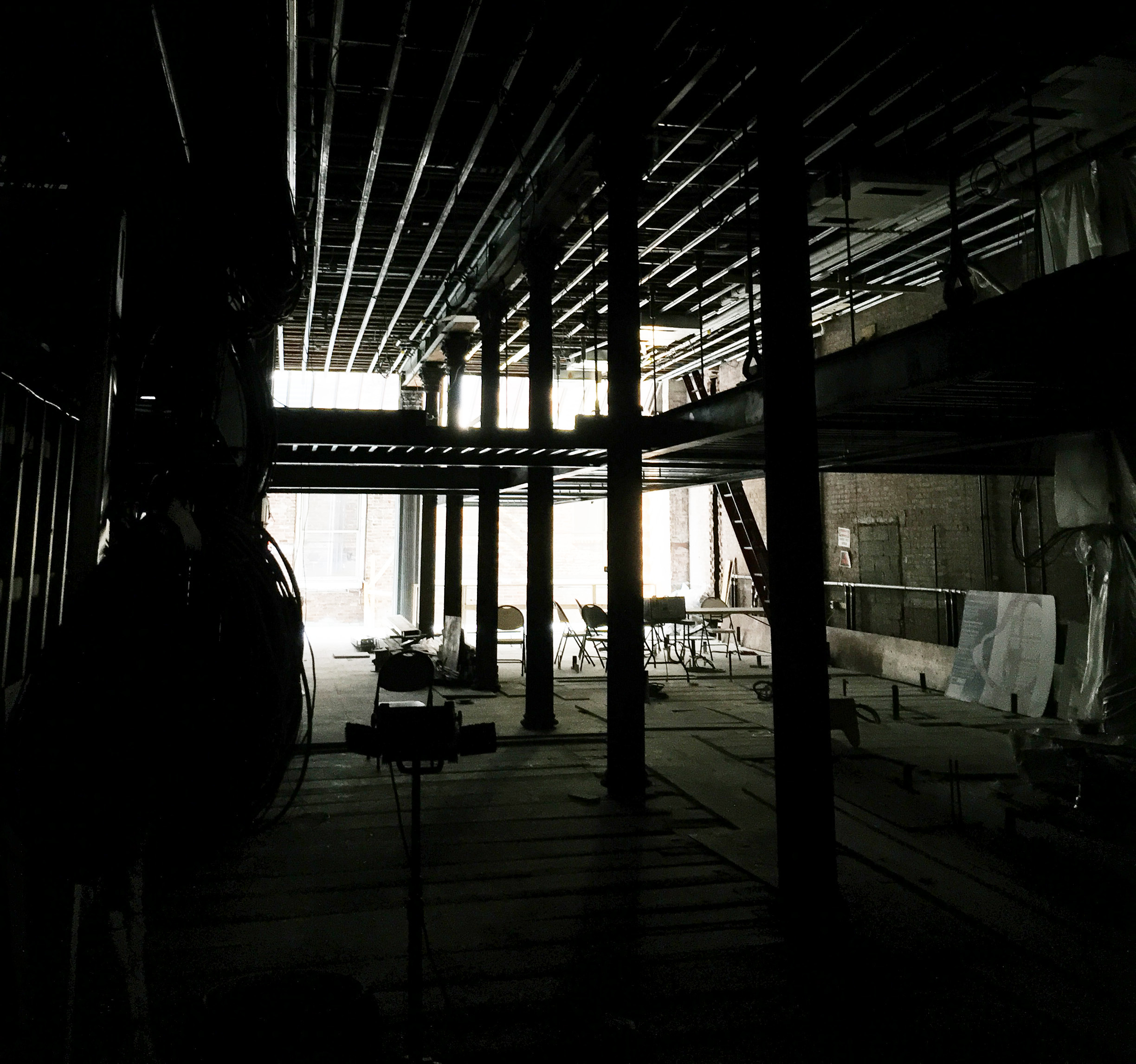

Restaurant information
- Established: 2012
- Closed: February 7, 2020
- Owner: Masa Takayama
- Food type: Robatayaki
- Location: 78 Leonard Street, Las Vegas, Nevada and Tribeca, Manhattan, New York City, United States

Tetsu was a modern Japanese restaurant conceived by Michelin-starred chef Masa Takayama, Tetsu served a Robatayaki-based menu with an emphasis upon grilled fare. The first location opened in the Aria Resort & Casino on the Las Vegas Strip in 2012, replacing Chef Takayama's Shaboo, which had occupied the space since 2009. In November 2017 a second branch opened in the Tribeca neighborhood of New York City. The New York location featured a casual ground-floor space for a la carte dining, and a separate cellar space named Basement which served fixed-price omakase meals.

In February 2018, it was announced that original Las Vegas location of Tetsu would be closing on April 2 of that year. The NY location closed in Feb 2020.
