= Yuzuki no Kimi =

Founder of the Japanese Hata clan

- 弓月君
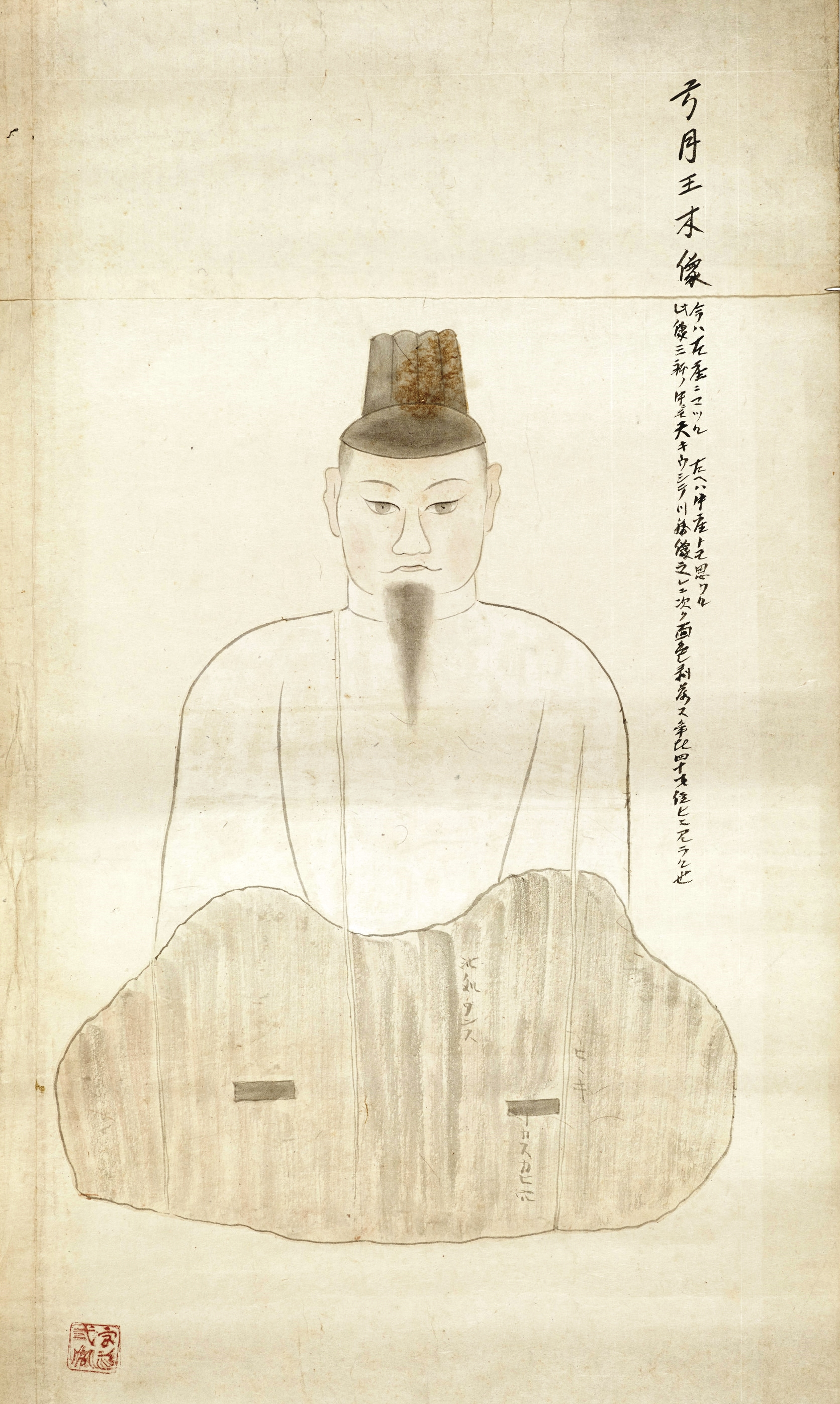
- Pronunciation: ゆづきのきみ
- Born: 3rd century? Paekche
- Died: Japan
- Other names: Yuzuki no Ō (弓月王; ゆづきのおう); Yuzuki (弓月; ゆづき)
- Occupation: Clan leader
- Family: Hata clan

Yuzuki no Kimi (弓月君) also known as Yuzuki no Ō (弓月王) or simply as Yuzuki (弓月), was the legendary founder of the Hata clan, an immigrant clan in ancient Japan who hailed from the kingdom of Paekche according to the Nihon Shoki and the Shinsen Shōjiroku.

He is considered one of the three most influential Toraijins alongside Achi no Omi and Wani during the Kofun period.

== History ==
=== Nihon Shoki ===
Yuzuki no Kimi is first mentioned in Nihon Shoki (720) as a person from Paekche who wished to emigrate to Japan alongside his 120 clan members. However, due to the prevention of the rival kingdom Silla, he and his men were hiding in Mimana (Kaya confederacy) and was seeking rescue from Emperor Ōjin.

Emperor Ōjin ordered Katsuragi no Sotsuhiko (葛城襲津彦), son of Takenouchi no Sukune, to enter Kaya and escort Yuzuki no Kimi and his fellow people back to Japan in 283. However, after his departure, Katsuragi no Sotsuhiko and Yuzuki no Kimi were not heard from again.

Two years later in 285, Emperor Ōjin sent Heguri no Tsuku, another son of Takenouchi no Sukune and brother of Katsuragi no Sotsuhiko, and Ikuhanodota no Sukune (的戸田宿禰) to Kaya, where the once lost party including additional members of Yuzuki no Kimi's clan "from 120 districts of his own land" arrived in Japan and naturalized.

=== Shinsen Shōjiroku ===
A century later, he is mentioned again in the Shinsen Shōjiroku (815) as the alleged founder of an immigrant clan called the "Hata clan". The book also claims that the Hata clan and the founder, Yuzuki no Kimi were descendants of Emperor Qin of the Qin dynasty.

However, due to historical, archeological and chronological inconsistencies, it is widely regarded by many Japanese historians as a false claim made under a misconception formed by baseless rumors found in the Records of the Three Kingdoms and they are considered most likely from the kingdom of Silla, and not the aforementioned locations. (Note: 『古代に朝鮮半島から渡来した氏族。《日本書紀》応神天皇条に，秦始皇帝(しんのしこうてい)子孫という伝承をもつ弓月君（ゆづきのきみ）が多数の民を率いて渡来したのに始まるとしますが，「はた」は古代朝鮮語で海の意であり，実際は5世紀中頃に新羅から渡来した氏族集団と考えられます。』 "A clan that immigrated from the Korean Peninsula in ancient times. In the Emperor Ōjin section of Nihon Shoki, it is said that Yuzuki no Kimi, who is said to have been a descendant of the First Qin Emperor, led a large group of people to Japan. However, "Hata" means "sea" in ancient Korean, and it is thought that the tribe actually came from Silla in the mid-5th century." — Kyoto City, History of the City 01 [Hata clan] 『以上の来歴は、実際にはあまりあてにならず、近年では、秦氏は朝鮮半島の新羅地方出身であろうと考えられています。』 "The historical accounts are not very reliable, and in recent years it has been thought that the Hata clan came from the Silla region of the Korean Peninsula." — Fushimi Inari-taisha) It is very likely that the descendants of the Hata clan (originally from Silla) self-proclaimed Yuzuki no Kimi as their clan founder (Note: Historically, they most likely had no relations at all as no sources allude to Hata and Yuzuki no Kimi being related outside of the Shinsen Shōjiroku. This is also applied to Hata and Emperor Qin which is also only found in the Shinsen Shōjiroku. Similarly, the relationship between Yuzuki no Kimi and Emperor Qin is also questionable.) during the compilation of the Shinsen Shōjiroku and thus gave him the background of being a descendant of Emperor Qin based on Silla's previous kingdom, Jinhan's relations with the dynasty (see History of Jinhan confederacy).

== Origin ==
According to the Nihon Shoki, Yuzuki no Kimi hails from Paekche and had close ties with the Kaya confederacy, bringing his people from 120 districts from the areas.

Source	Year	Claim
Nihon Shoki	720	It states that he immigrated to Japan from Paekche with 120 clan members from an unspecified family.
Shinsen Shōjiroku	815	Adds the claim that he is in fact the founder of the Hata clan and the claim that he is a descendant of Emperor Qin.

Much like the other prominent immigrants such as Wani and Achi no Omi, modern historians consider Yuzuki no Kimi to be a fictional individual whose story was added later to help create origin stories for clans with foreign backgrounds.

== Name ==
The name "Yuzuki no Kimi" is not found in any other sources outside of Japan. His presence and accomplishments are only found in the Nihon Shoki and Shinsen Shōjiroku, and not in any records of Korea or China, places that he's allegedly from. However, Japanese and Korean linguists have deduced that Yuzuki no Kimi was most likely a name that alluded to Korean origins as his name could be read as "Kudara (弓月/궁달/Kungdar)" in Korean using the Idu system, which means "Paekche" in Japanese.

It is believed that when giving Hata clan an origin story for their founder, a name that sounded closest to the name "Paekche/Kudara" was given due to the close relationship with Japan and Paekche. Subsequently, Silla (the kingdom the clan is thought to have originated from) was antagonized as relationship between Japan and Silla was strained at the time while Paekche and Kaya, another kingdom that was mentioned in Yuzuki no Kimi's story, were portrayed as countries that Japanese individuals could freely enter without restrictions.

This sentiment is further examined in his alternate name, "Yuzuki no Ō (弓月王)" or "King Yuzuki" despite not referencing him of being royalty. It is believed that Yuzuki no Kimi and other invented clan founders were given the "King" title (also seen in Achi no Ō) to elevate their importance in their respective clan's founding stories.

== See also ==
- Hata clan: Yuzuki no Kimi's clan.
- Toraijin
  - Achi no Omi
  - Wani
- Heguri no Tsuku
