= Akira =

Akira may refer to:

== People ==
- Akira (given name); and a list of people with this given name

=== Surnames ===
- Asa Akira (born 1986), American pornographic actress, model, and director
- Elly Akira, Japanese pornographic actress
- Francesco Akira (born 1999), Japanese ring name for Italian wrestler Francesco Begnini

=== Mononymed people ===
- Akira (actor) (born 1981), Japanese actor and dance performer
- Akira (American wrestler) (born 1993), American professional wrestler
- Akira Nogami (born 1966; ring name "AKIRA"), Japanese professional wrestler and actor
- Natalie Horler (born 1981; stage name "Akira"), German singer and television presenter formerly using the stagename "Akira"
- Akira the Don, stagename of British DJ Adam Narkiewicz
- Akira the Hustler (born 1969), stagename of Japanese artist Yukio Cho

=== Fictional characters ===
- Akira Yuki, a major character of the Virtua Fighter series of video games
- Akira (The Simpsons), a Japanese chef on The Simpsons
- Akira (Akira), a character from the 1980s cyberpunk manga of the same name
- Akira Hiragi, a character from Valkyrie Drive-Mermaid
- Akira Kurusu, the protagonist in the manga adaption of Persona 5
- Akira Otoishi, a minor antagonist and antihero in JoJo's Bizarre Adventure
- Akira Nijino, a.k.a. ToQ #6, a character from Ressha Sentai ToQger
- A-Kira, a.k.a. Minoru Tanaka, a character from Death Note

== Arts and entertainment properties ==
- Akira (franchise), a Japanese cyberpunk franchise
  - Akira (manga), a 1980s cyberpunk manga by Katsuhiro Otomo
  - Akira (1988 film), an anime film adaptation of the manga
  - Akira (video game), a 1988 video game based on the anime film
  - Akira Psycho Ball, a 2002 pinball simulator for PlayStation 2 based on the anime film
  - Akira (unproduced film), a planned live-action film adaptation of the manga
- Akira (2016 Hindi film), an Indian Hindi-language action film by A. R. Murugadoss, starring Sonakshi Sinha
- Akira (2016 Kannada film), an Indian Kannada-language romantic-drama film by G. Naveen Reddy, starring Anish Tejeshwar
- Akira (album), a 2017 album by Black Cab
- "Akira", a song by Kaddisfly from Buy Our Intention; We'll Buy You a Unicorn

== Other uses ==
- Akira class, a class of starship in Star Trek
- Akira (climb), a sport climbing route created in 1995 by French climber, Fred Rouhling
- Akira (brand), a consumer-electronics brand headquartered in Singapore
- Akira (ransomware)

== See also ==
- Akhirah, an Islamic term referring to the afterlife
- Aki Ra, former Khmer Rouge conscripted child soldier
- Akera, a marine genus of sea hare in the family Akeridae
- Aquila (disambiguation)
- Arika, a Japanese video game developer
- 哲 (disambiguation)
