= Philosophische =

Philosophische (German: philosophical) may refer to:

- Philosophy
- Philosophische Studien (Philosophical Studies), an academic journal
- Philosophical Investigations (Philosophische Untersuchungen), 1953 work by Ludwig Wittgenstein
- Philosophical Inquiries into the Essence of Human Freedom (Philosophische Untersuchungen über das Wesen der menschlichen Freiheit), 1809 work by Friedrich Schelling

== See also ==
- Philosophy (disambiguation)
