= Heguri no Tsuku =

Nihon shoki ancient character

Heguri no Tsuku (平群 木菟; fl. 2nd to 5th c. C.E.?) was a Japanese diplomat and powerful figure (gōzoku) in ancient Japan. He was the founder of the Heguri clan. He is recorded in Japan's earliest literary texts, the Kojiki (712) and the Nihon Shoki (720). He bore the title Sukune and was also known as Heguri no Tsuku no Sukune, or simply Tsuku no Sukune.

== Life ==
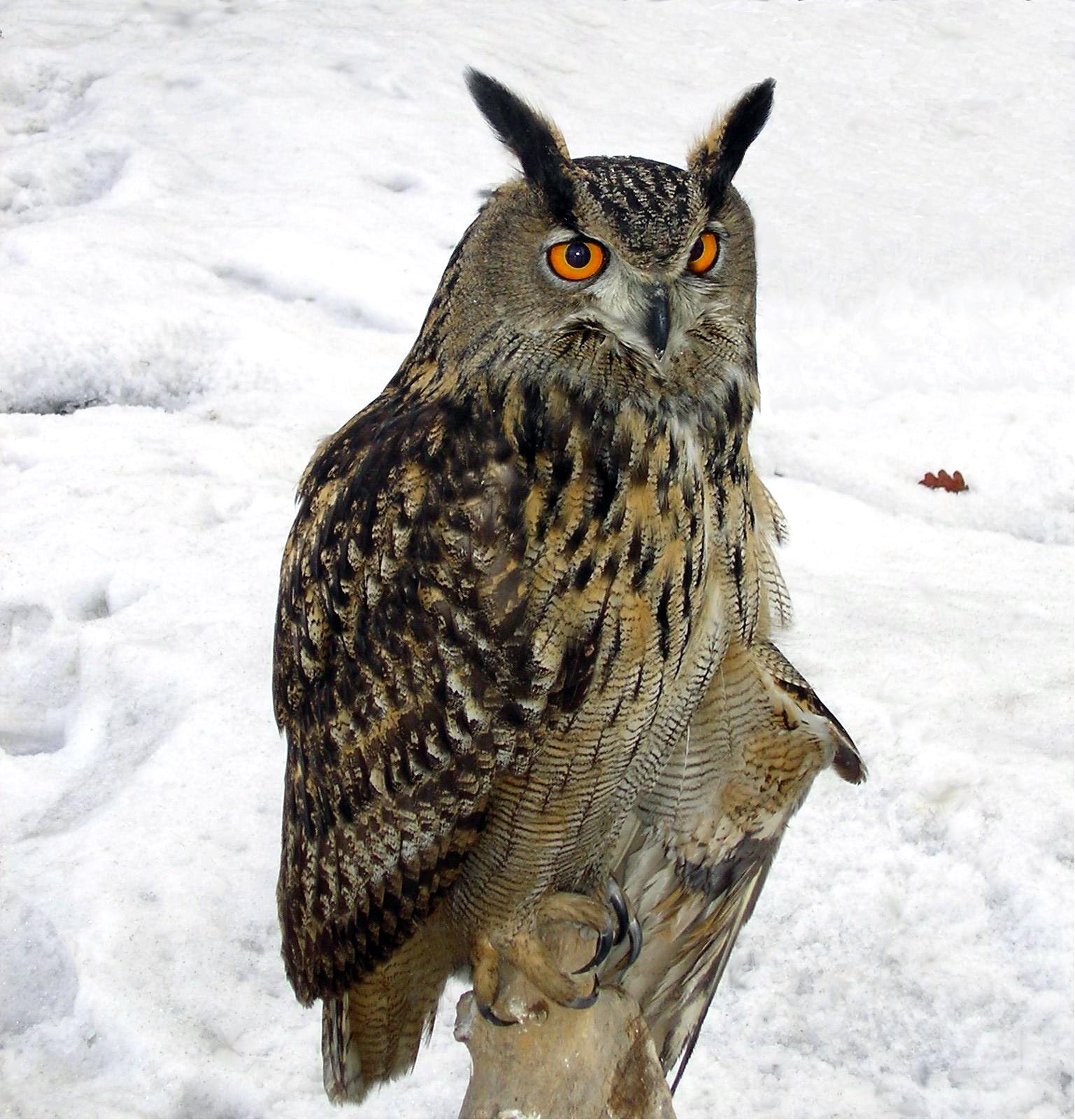
An eagle owl (tsuku)

According to Nihon Shoki, Tsuku no Sukune was born the son of Takenouchi no Sukune. He is said to have been born on the same day as Emperor Ōjin's son Ōsazaki (later Emperor Nintoku). When the two were born, an eagle owl (tsuku in Japanese) flew into the delivery room of Ōjin's son, and a wren (sazaki in Japanese) flew into the delivery room of Takenouchi no Sukune's son. The two fathers exchanged the names of these birds, and thus Takenouchi no Sukune's son was named Tsuku and Ōjin's son was named Ōsazaki.

However, there are earlier records of him. In the third year of Ōjin's reign, he went to Paekche with Ki no Tsuno, Hata no Yashiro, and Soga no Ishikawa to condemn Jinsa of Baekje of being disrespectful to the Japanese emperor. In response to this, the kingdom condemned and executed Jinsa as an apology. Tsuku and the others put Asin of Paekche in power and returned to Japan, however, this claim found in the Japanese records do not align with Korean records as it states that Jinsa died while hunting.

In the 8th month of the 16th year of Ōjin's reign, when Katsuragi no Sotsuhiko (葛城襲津彦) did not return from Korea for a long time, the emperor concluded that Silla was preventing him from leaving and sent Tsuku and Ikuha no Toda no Sukune with their elite troops to Silla. When Tsuku and his army arrived at the border of Silla, the king of Silla was so shocked that he submitted to the crime and came to Japan with Sotsuhiko and the people of Yuzuki no Kimi (a Korean immigrant clan).

Tsuku was active as a diplomat, and was often sent to Paekche and the Gaya confederacy in Korea on diplomatic missions. According to Nihon Shoki, he was active as a diplomat during the 5th century and also retained diplomatic relations to Silla.

He helped Emperor Richū to succeed the throne after the death of Emperor Nintoku during a power struggle for succession. Richū's younger brother Suminoe no Nakatsumiko rebelled against the Crown Prince, Richū. Tsuku, Mononobe no Ōmae, and Achi no Omi informed Richū about the rebellion, but he did not believe them. In response, the three put Richū on a horse and fled. After this, they suppressed the rebellion of Prince Naka (Nakatsumiko) according to the orders of Mitsuhawake no Sumeramikoto (later Emperor Hanzei). However, a former supporter of Prince Naka, a Hayato named Sashihire (Sobakari), killed Prince Naka. Tsuku and the others killed Sashihire in return and commented, "For us this is a great achievement, but for the Emperor this is merciless."

== See also ==
- Jinsa of Bakje
- Paekche
- Gaya confederacy
- Silla
- Yuzuki no Kimi
- Hata clan
