= Tamura (surname) =

Tamura (usually written 田村) is a Japanese surname. Notable people with the surname include:

- Akihide Tamura (born 1947), Japanese photographer
- Akira Tamura (田村 明, 1926–2010), Japanese city planner
- Atsushi Tamura (born 1973), Japanese comedian
- Eriko Tamura (born 1973), Japanese actress and singer
- George T. Tamura (1927–2010), American artist
- Hajime Tamura (1924–2014), Japanese politician
- Hirotaka Tamura, Japanese engineer
- Hoju Tamura (1874–1940), better known as Hon'inbō Shūsai, Japanese Go player
- Kiyoshi Tamura (born 1969), Japanese wrestler
- Kōsuke Tamura, Japanese Japanese shogi player
- Masakazu Tamura (1943–2021), Japanese actor
- Meimi Tamura (born 1998), Japanese singer and member of girl group S/mileage
- Minoru N. Tamura 20th century Japanese botanist
- Misako Tamura (田村 美佐子; born 1934), Japanese swimmer
- Mutsumi Tamura (born 1987), Japanese voice actress
- Nao Tamura (田村 奈央), Japanese voice actress
- Naomi Tamura (born 1963), Japanese singer
- Naoya Tamura (田村 直也; born 1984), Japanese footballer
- Naoya Tamura (speed skater) (田村 直也; born 1979), Japanese speed skater
- Nobuyoshi Tamura (1933–2010), Japanese aikido trainer
- Norihisa Tamura (田村 憲久; born 1964), Japanese politician
- Ryō Tamura (actor) (born 1946), Japanese actor
- Ryō Tamura (comedian) (born 1972), Japanese comedian and television presenter
- Ryoko Tamura, Japanese female judoka and politician
- Takaaki Tamura, Japanese politician
- Takashi Tamura (田村 孝; born 1961), Japanese sailor
- Tamura Ryuichi (1923–1998), Japanese writer
- Sakae Tamura (photographer) (1906–1987), Japanese photographer
- Sakae Tamura (nature photographer) (1910–2003), Japanese magazine editor and photographer of nature
- Shane Devon Tamura, perpetrator of the 2025 New York City shooting
- Shigeru Tamura (photographer) (1909–1987), Japanese photographer
- Shigeru Tamura (illustrator), Japanese illustrator
- Tamura Toshiko (1884–1945), pen-name of Japanese writer Toshi Satō
- Tatsuhiro Tamura (田村 龍弘; born 1994), Japanese baseball player
- Tomoya Tamura (田村 朋也; born 1992), Japanese sprinter
- Yoshiko Tamura (born 1976), Japanese professional wrestler
- Yukari Tamura (born 1976), Japanese singer and voice actress
- Yu Tamura (born 1989), Japanese rugby union player
- Yu Tamura (footballer) (born 1992), Japanese footballer
- Yuki Tamura (田村 祐基; born 1985), Japanese footballer
- Yusuke Tamura (田村 友佑; born 1998), Japanese long-distance runner

== Fictional characters ==
- Manami Tamura (田村 麻奈実), a character in the light novel series Oreimo
