= Takenouchi no Sukune =

Legendary Japanese hero-statesman

Takenouchi no Sukune 武内宿禰
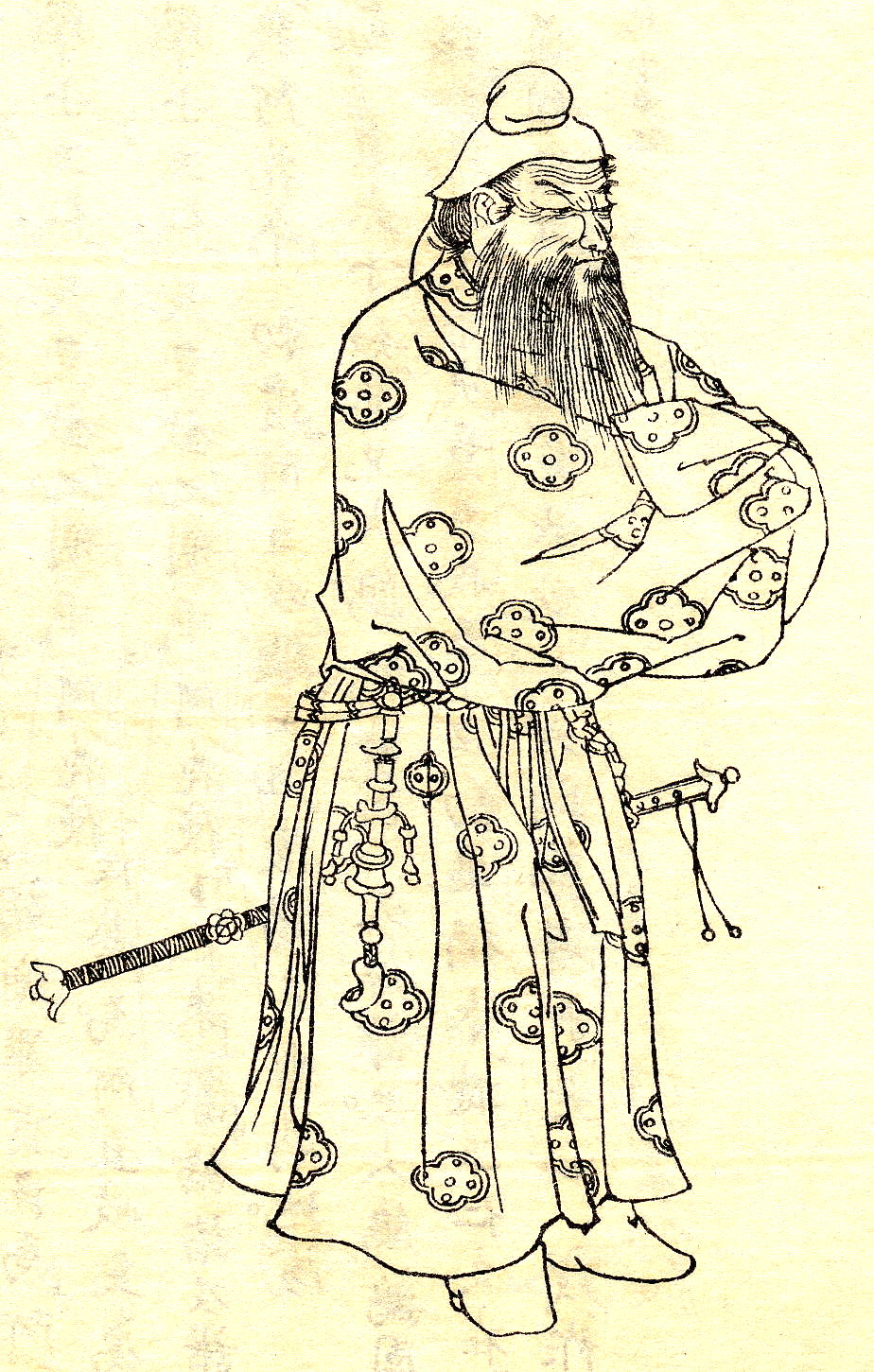
- Takenouchi no Sukune drawn by Kikuchi Yosai

Ōomi

Personal details
- Born: 84 AD
- Died: Unknown
- Children: Hata no Yashiro; Kose no Okara; Soga no Ishikawa; Heguri no Tsuku; Ki no Tsuno; Kume no Matio-hime; Nonoiro-hime; Katsuragi no Sotsuhiko; Wakugo no Sukune
- Parent: Yanushi Otake Ogokoro no Mikoto (father)

Takenouchi no Sukune (武内宿禰) or Takeshiuchi no Sukune was a legendary hero and statesman of the 1st century (mid-Yayoi period, Japan). He was enshrined as a kami (divine figure). He is recorded in Japan's earliest literary texts, the Kojiki (ca. 712) and the Nihon Shoki (720).

== Life ==
Takenouchi no Sukune was supposedly the son of Princess Kagehime, and is said to be grandson to Prince Hikofutsuoshinomikoto (彦太忍信命). Descended from Emperor Kōgen, Takenouchi no Sukune served under five legendary emperors, Emperor Keikō, Emperor Seimu, Emperor Chūai, Emperor Ōjin, and Emperor Nintoku, but was perhaps best known for his service as Grand Minister (Ōomi) to the Regent Empress Jingū, with whom he supposedly invaded Korea. While Jingu was regent to her son, Ōjin, Takenouchi was accused of treason. He underwent the "ordeal of boiling water" (kugatachi) as a way to prove his innocence.

In addition to his martial services to these emperors, he was reputedly also a saniwa, or spirit medium.

He is said to have been the grandson of Hikofutsuoshinomikoto in the Nihon Shoki, where as the Kojiki states that he was the son of Hikofutsuoshinomikoto.

== Possible connections to Korea ==
Japanese historians have theorized a possible inference to Takenouchi no Sukune found in ancient Korea's Samguk sagi where a name called "Udojugun (于道朱君; 우도주군)" is mentioned. In the book, it states that during the time a Japanese envoy "Kalnago[?] (葛那古; 갈나고)" (Note: Possibly a misinterpretation of Takeuchi no Sukune's son, "Katsuragi no Sotsuhiko (葛城襲津彦)" due to both names sharing the "葛" character. "Kalnago" may be a shortened form of "Katsuragi no Sotsuhiko" as "Karako/Kalnago".) stayed in Silla, a royal named "Seok Uro (昔于老; 석우로)" of the Gyeongju Seok clan also a descendant of Talhae of Silla from Japan, accompanied him. However after a while, the two started to banter where Seok Uro threatened to "make the emperor of Japan a salt making slave and his wife who cooks rice" as a heavy joke. After relaying the message to the emperor himself (not specified, only referred to as Okimi), a general named Udojugun was sent to the Korean peninsula and declared war against Silla.

According to scholars, Udojugun and Takenouchi no Sukune might have been the same individual as Takenouchi no Sukune's pronunciation would have been closer to "Utusukune (内宿禰)" in Old Japanese. In addition, Wakan Sansai Zue also mentions Takenouchi no Sukune's accomplishments during the Silla–Wa War (part of the series of wars within the Silla–Goguryeo and Paekche–Kaya–Wa War) further adding credence to his involvement during the Silla period. As a similar sounding name appears in Korean records while also having historical documents that support his authenticity to an extent, scholars deduced that though not completely accurate, Takenouchi no Sukune can be considered an individual who had truly existed.

According to world-renowned linguist and Japanese language expert Alexander Vovin, due to Amenohiboko being of Korean origin, Empress Jingū and her son and successor, Emperor Ōjin might have been native speakers of the Korean language. Vovin states that since Takenouchi no Sukune was able to interact with Korean kingdoms during their rule, he stated that Takenouchi no Sukune may also have been of foreign origin as not only did he have jurisdiction over Japan–Korean affairs, but was also the father of many clan founders that have heavy connections with Korea.

== Legacy ==
Twenty-eight Japanese clans are said to be descended from Takenouchi no Sukune, including Takeuchi and Soga. He is a legendary figure, and is said to have drunk daily from a sacred well, which helped him live to be 280 years old. He is enshrined at Ube Shrine in the Iwami district, Tottori and at Hachiman shrines.

His portrait has appeared on the Japanese yen, and dolls of him are popular Children's Day gifts.

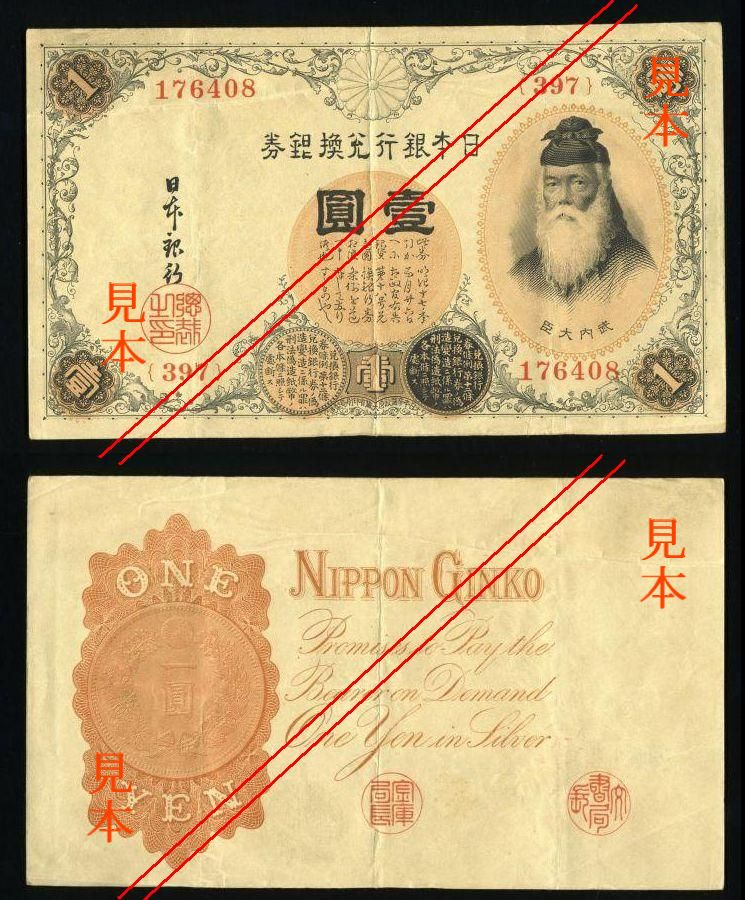
Yen bill with a representative drawing attributed to Takenouchi no Sukune on its obverse.

- First convertible silver yen bill (1889-1958)
- First five yen bill (1899-1939)
- Third five yen bill (1916-1939)
- Second one-yen bill (1943-1958)
- Second 200 yen bill (1945-1946)

== Family ==
- Father: Yanushi Otake Ogokoro no Mikoto (屋主忍男武雄心命, ?–?)
- Mother: Yamashita no Kage-hime (影媛), sister of Kiinokuni no Miyatsukuko Uzuhiko (Ujihiko) (山下影日売)
  - Wife(s): unknown
    - Son: Hata no Yashiro (羽田矢代, ?–?), ancestor of the Hata clan (波多氏) related to Hata clan (秦氏).
    - Son: Kose no Okara (許勢小柄, ?–?), ancestor of the Kose clan (巨勢氏).
    - Son: Soga no Ishikawa (蘇我石川, ?–?), ancestor of the Soga clan (蘇我氏).
    - Son: Heguri no Tsuku (平群木菟, ?–?), ancestor of the Heguri clan (平群氏).
    - Son: Ki no Tsuno (紀角, ?–?), ancestor of the Ki clan (紀氏).
    - Daughter: Kume no Maito-hime (久米能摩伊刀比売, ?–?)
    - Daughter: Nonoiro-hime (怒能伊呂比売, ?–?)
    - Son: Katsuragi no Sotsuhiko (葛城襲津彦, ?–?), ancestor of the Katsuragi clan (葛城氏).
    - Son: Wakugo no Sukune (若子宿禰)

== Artwork ==
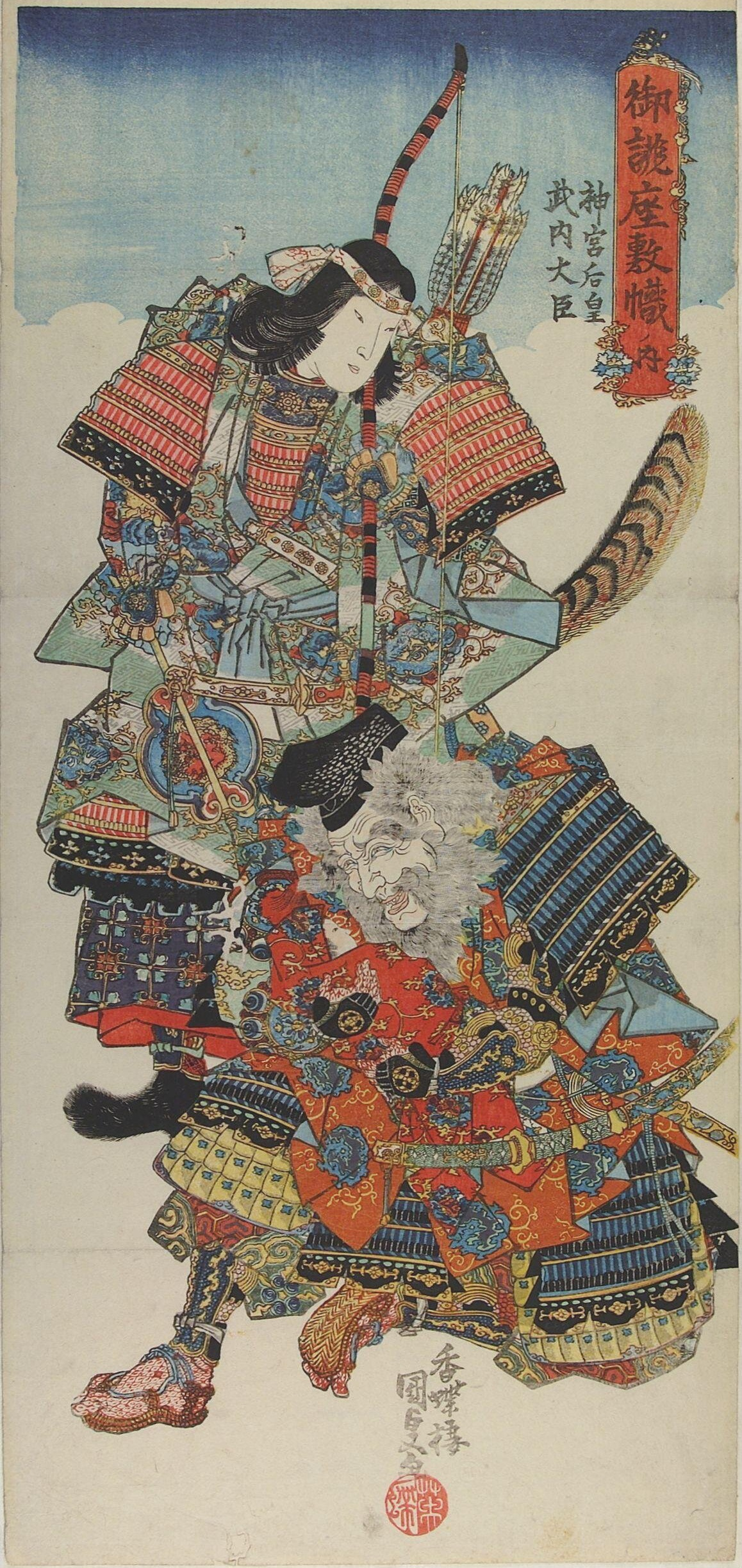
Empress Jingū (above) and Takenouchi no Sukune (below) Fishing at Chikuzen

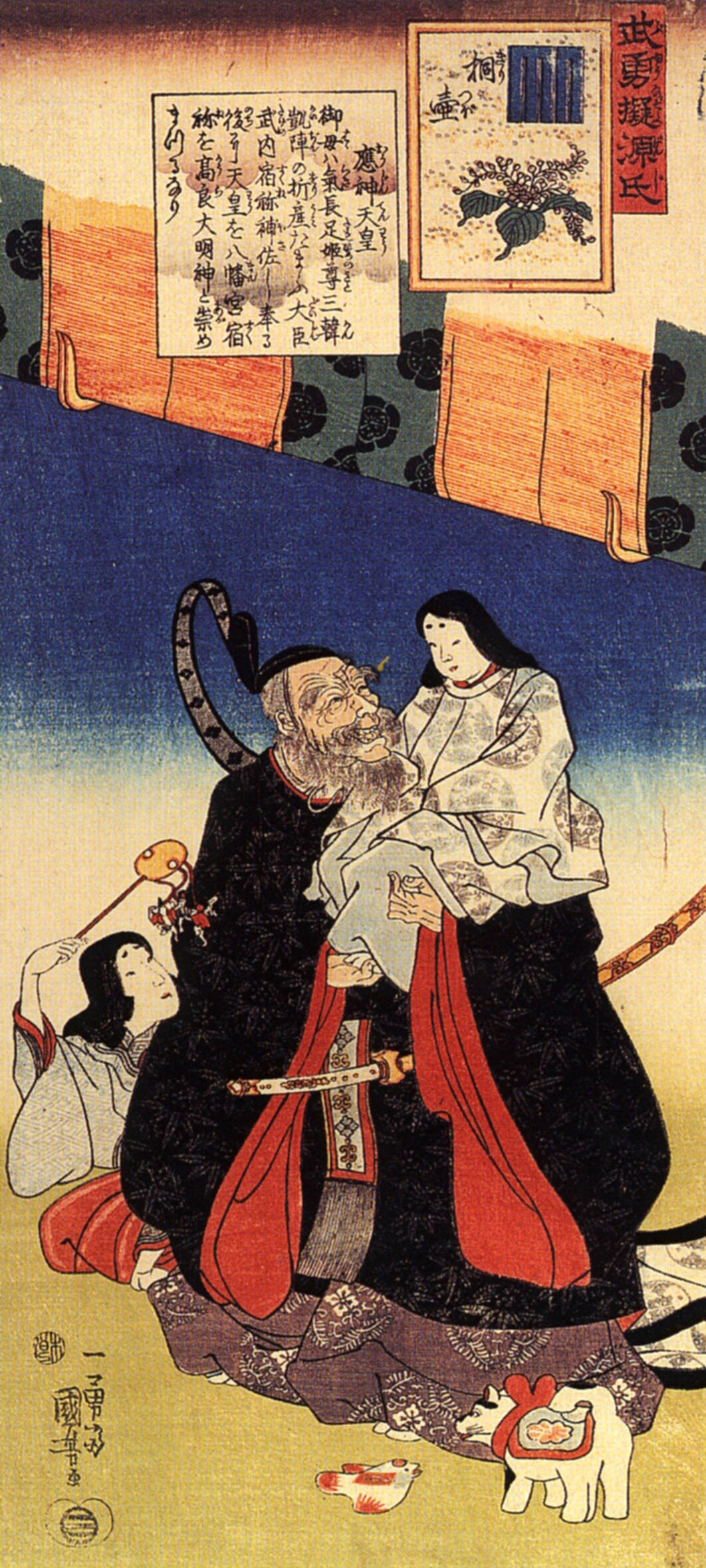
Minister Takeuchi carrying the infant Emperor Ōjin.
Made by Utagawa Kuniyoshi

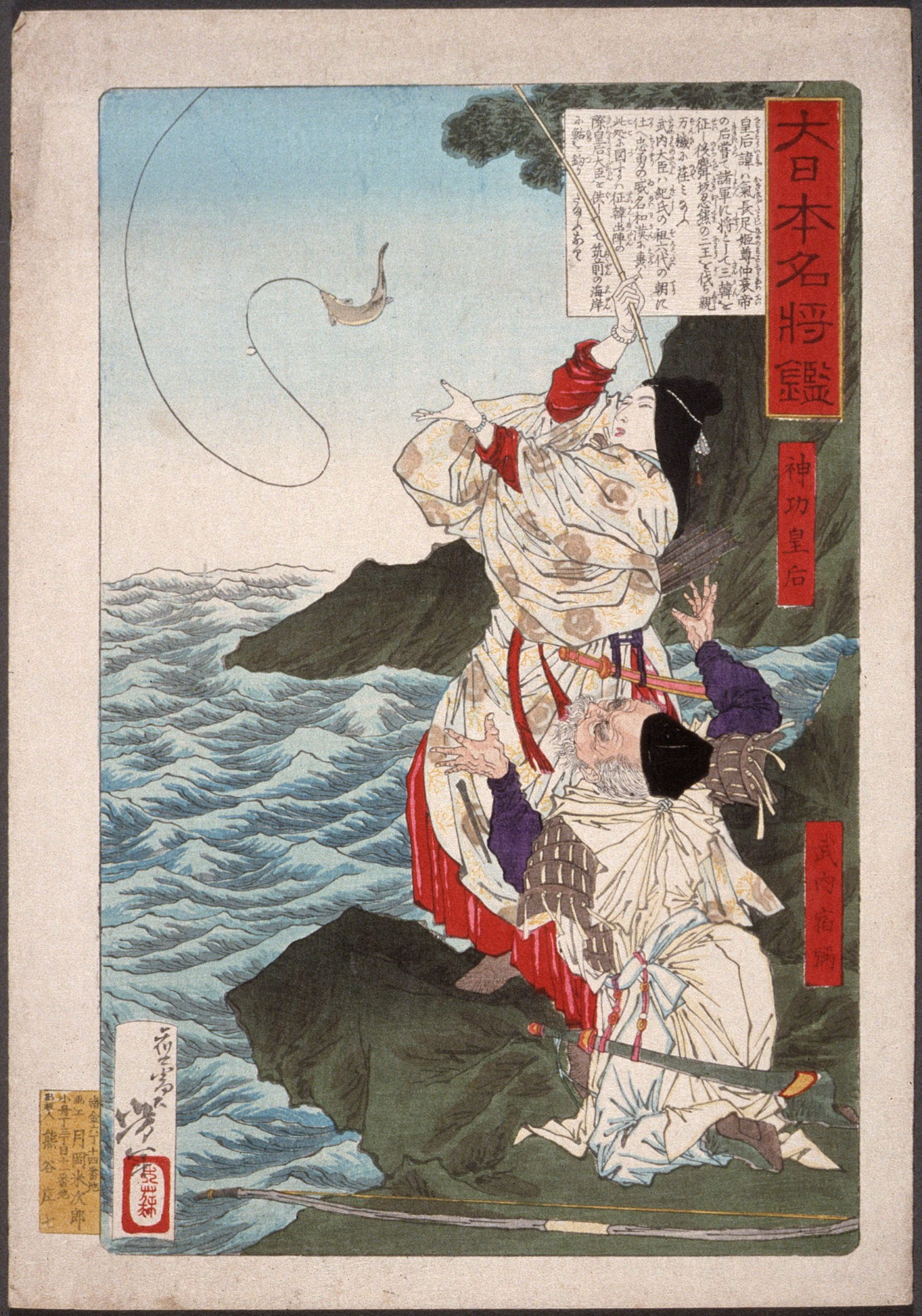
Empress Consort Jingū and Takenouchi fish in Chikuzen.
Print of Tsukioka Yoshitoshi (1876)

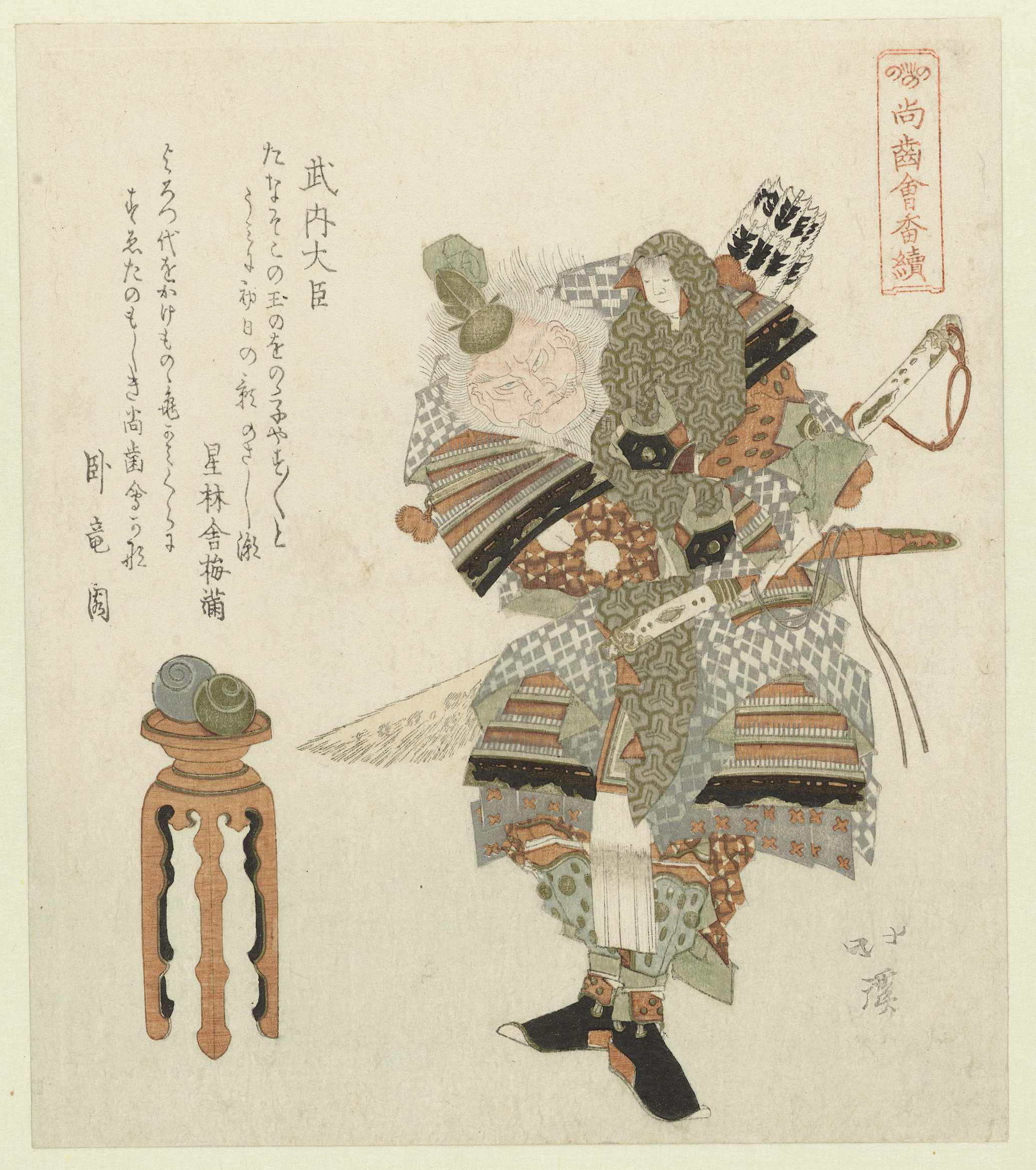
The Regent Takeuchi no Sukune.
Print of Totoya Hokkei (1822)

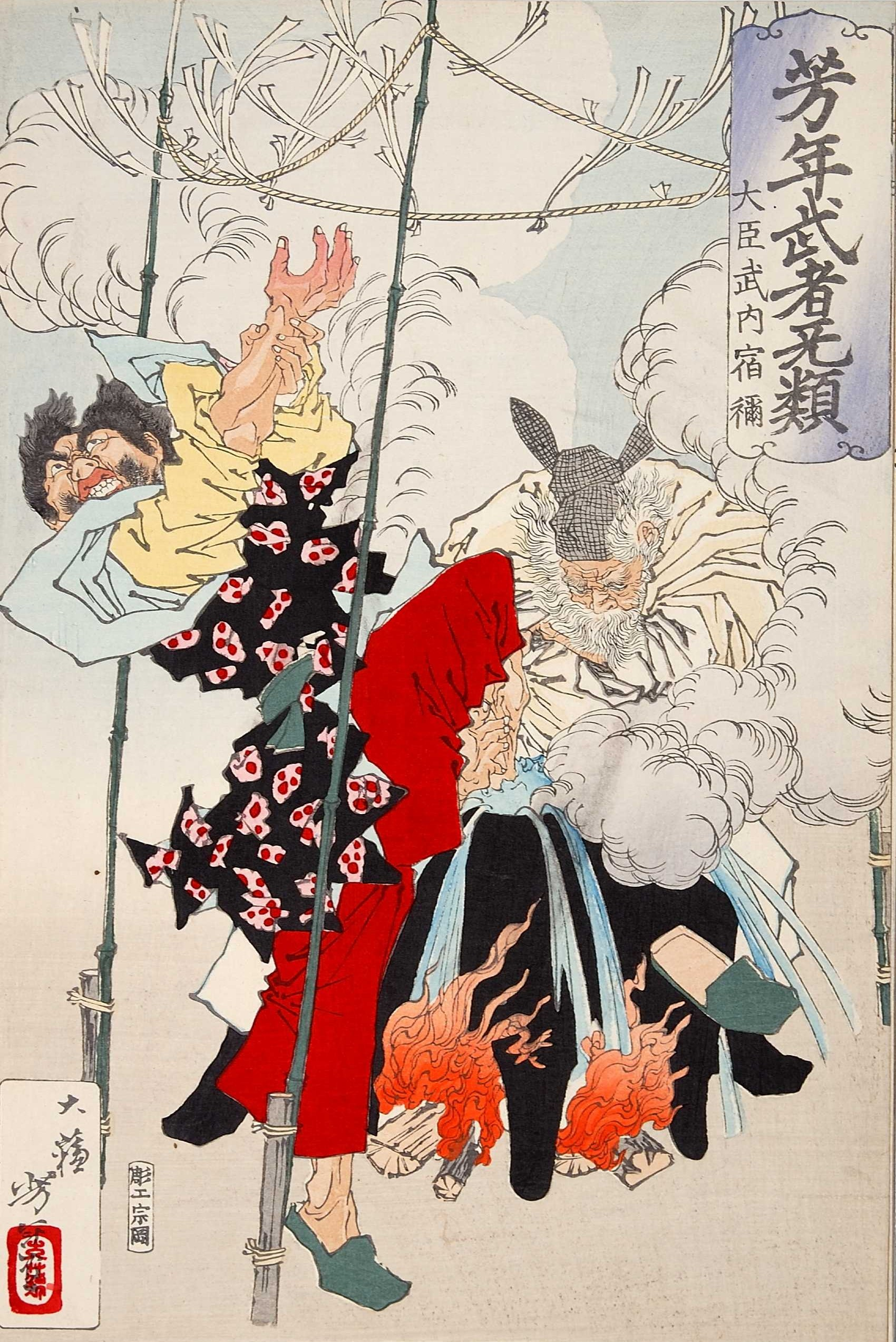
Daijin Takenouchi no Sukune by Tsukioka Yoshitoshi
