= Akira Hirose =

Japanese engineer

Akira Hirose is an engineer at the University of Tokyo, Japan. He was named a Fellow of the Institute of Electrical and Electronics Engineers in 2013 for his contributions to the theory and radar applications of complex-valued neural networks.
