= Chay Sudan =

Chay Sudan چاي سودان
- Village
- Location within Iran
- Coordinates: 31°03′08″N 49°17′57″E
- Country: Iran
- Province: Khuzestan
- County: Ramshir
- Bakhsh: Central
- Rural District: Abdoliyeh-ye Sharqi

Population (2006)
  - Total: 70
- Time zone: UTC+3:30 (IRST)
  - Summer (DST): UTC+4:30 (IRDT)

Chay Sudan (Persian: چاي سودان, also Romanized as Chāy Sūdān; also known as Chāh Sūdān, Chūl, 'Omūr, and Sūdān Chāy) is a village in Abdoliyeh-ye Sharqi Rural District, in the Central District of Ramshir County, Khuzestan province, Iran. At the 2006 census, its population was 70, in 13 families.
