= Akira Tomii =

Japanese diplomat

Baron Akira Tomii (富井 周, Tomii Akira; August 17, 1891 – January 23, 1959) was a Japanese diplomat.

== Biography ==
He was born as a son of Baron Masaaki Tomii, the president of Tokyo Imperial University of Legal and a draft member of Japanese Civil Law. When he was young, his father hired Keita Gotō as Akira's home teacher.

Akira Tomii graduated Tokyo Imperial University, and served as the Japanese Consul in Mukden, China, in 1915. From 1916 to 1924 served as consul in New York City, from 1924 to 1927 as consul in London, and from 1927 to 1933 as consul in Ottawa, Ontario, Canada. From 1933 to 1936 he was consul in San Francisco, and from 1936 to 1938 again consul in London, before returning to Ottawa for another stint from 1938 to 1940.

He served as Japanese Ambassador to Argentina from March 1941 to January 1944, while also serving as non-resident Ambassador to Paraguay and Uruguay.

His daughter Ayako married Yasuo Ishizaka, a son of Taizō Ishizaka, the president of Toshiba and Japan Federation of Economic Organizations.
