= Philosophy (disambiguation) =

Philosophy is the study of general and fundamental problems concerning matters such as existence and knowledge.

Philosophy may also refer to:

- Philosophical theory, a larger body of systematic philosophical theory
- Philosophy (brand), a North American cosmetics and skin care company
- Philosophy (journal), a journal published by the Cambridge University Press
- Philosophy (Salvator Rosa), a 1640 painting by Salvator Rosa
- Philosophy (album), an album by Coldcut
- Philosophy: The Best of Bill Hicks, an album by Bill Hicks
- "Philosophy" (Ben Folds Five song)
- "Philosophy", a song by Tom Snare
- Wikipedia philosophy phenomenon, a tendency for articles' first link on Wikipedia to end at Philosophy

== See also ==
- Wikipedia philosophy phenomenon
- Wikipedia:Getting to Philosophy
- Philosophy of life, an attitude to life or way or principle of living
- All pages with titles beginning with Philosophy
- 哲 (disambiguation)
