= Akira Aoyama =

Japanese bureaucrat

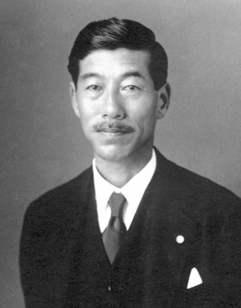
Akira Aoyama in May 1934

Akira Aoyama (Japanese: 青山士, September 23, 1878 - March 21, 1963) was a Japanese civil engineer who led the projects of the drainage canals of the Arakawa River, Tokyo, and the Shinano River, Niigata Prefecture. He also worked as one of the leaders of the land surveyor teams during the construction of the Panama Canal.

== Education ==
Akira Aoyama was born in Iwata, Shizuoka Prefecture, Japan, in 1878. After elementary school there, he moved to Tokyo to study at the middle school, which would later become Hibiya High School, and at the First Higher School, a university preparatory school that would later be merged into the University of Tokyo as the College of Arts and Sciences. In 1903, he graduated from the University of Tokyo, with his major in civil engineering. He became a Christian at the influence of Kanzo Uchimura who was teaching at the university.

== Panama Canal ==
Upon graduation from the university, Aoyama went to the U.S. with an introduction letter by one of the university professors to William Hubert Burr who taught civil engineering at Columbia University. Burr at that time was on the Isthmian Canal Commission, and recommended him to work on the Panama Canal.

Aoyama first worked for the railroad in Panama. He then worked as a land surveyor for the canal construction, later becoming a leader of one of the surveyor teams, the only known Japanese who contributed to the canal construction. In 1911, he made a home leave to Japan, but never returned to Panama, due to the souring relationship between U.S. and Japan.

== Back in Japan ==
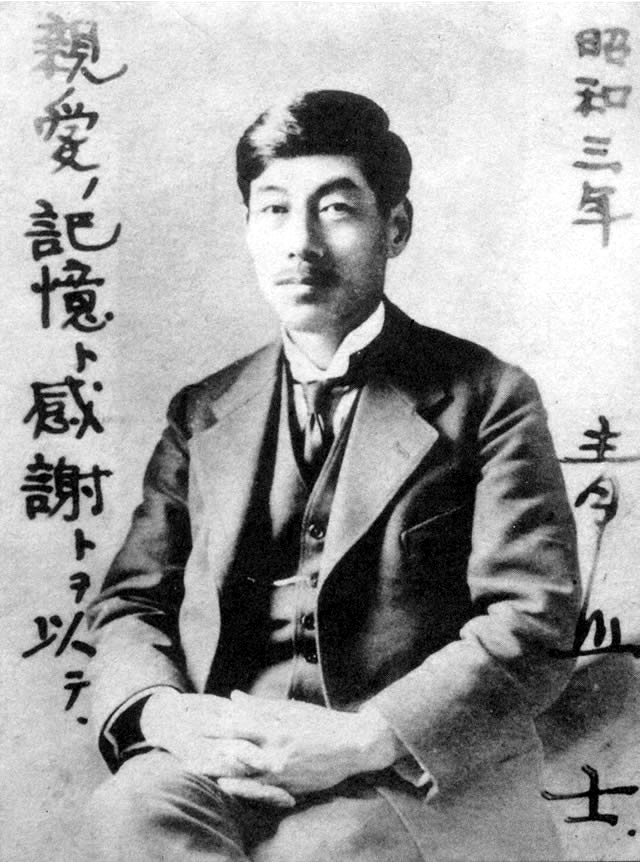
Akira Aoyama in 1928

In 1912, Aoyama started to work for the Home Ministry, and led for 19 years the construction of the drainage canal of the Arakawa River, Tokyo. When there was a major accident of the breakage of Ōkōzu diversion facility of the Shinano River, Niigata Prefecture, in 1927, he became the manager to construct the Ōkōzu diversion canal (Japanese: 大河津分水路), which was completed in 1931.

In 1934, Aoyama was appointed the fifth Engineer of the Home Ministry, and, while in that position, started the multi-purpose management of the Japanese rivers, initially proposed by Nagaho Monobe. From 1935, Aoyama served as the President of Japan Society of Civil Engineers. After retirement in 1946, Aoyama advised on Tokyo's committee on water quality and other activities.

In the Arakawa Museum of Acqua in Tokyo there is a current exhibition of Akira Aoyama and his life during Panama Canal construction.

He died in 1963 at his home in Iwata, Shizuoka Prefecture.

== Episodes ==
- Towards the end of World War II, the Japanese Imperial Navy, concerned that the Allied's battleships may be moved from the Atlantic arena to the Pacific at the possible defeat of Nazi Germany, tried to get Aoyama's consultation to make a hasty plan to destroy the Panama Canal. Aoyama rejected such consultation, and is said to have replied: "I know how to construct the Panama Canal, but do not know how to destroy it".

== See also ==
- United States construction of the Panama canal, 1904–1914, of the Panama Canal
