= Akira Furuya =

Japanese art director

- Born: Japan
- Occupation: Animation art director

Akira Furuya (古谷 彰, Furuya Akira) is a Japanese anime art director.

== Projects ==
All credits are for art director unless otherwise noted.

- Atashin'chi
- Esper Mami
- Hamtaro (TV series and movies)
- High School! Kimengumi (TV series and movie)
- Hare Tokidoki Buta
- Oishinbo (episodes 27–28 were special selections of the 27th Galaxy Award)
- Ultraman USA
