= Kugatachi =

Trial by ordeal in Shinto

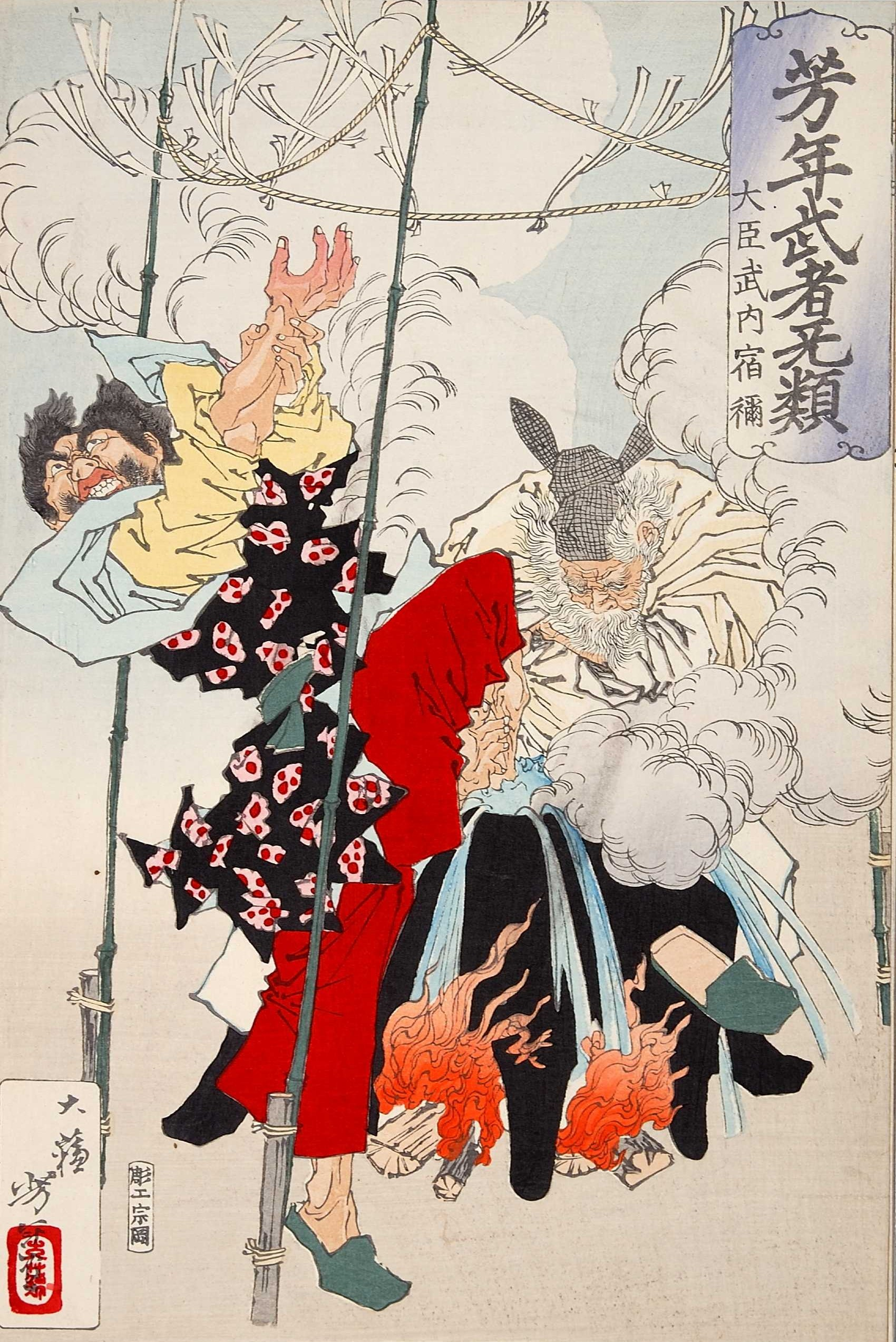
Minister Takenouchi no Sukune, painting by Hoshinen Tsukioka

Kugatachi (盟神探湯) is a kind of trial by ordeal that was conducted in ancient Japan. It was done through exposure to boiling water and it is believed that innocent people would not be scalded and guilty people would be scalded due to divine intervention by kami.

== See also ==
- Trial by ordeal
- Trial by fire (law)
- Bocca della Verità
