= Akira Arimura =

Japanese academic

- Born: December 26, 1923; Kobe, Hyōgo, Japan
- Died: December 10, 2007
- Education: Nagoya University School of Medicine (M.D., Ph.D.)
- Scientific career
- Fields: Endocrinology; Physiology; Biochemistry

Akira Arimura (有村 章, Arimura Akira; December 26, 1923 – December 10, 2007) was a Japanese-American professor of medicine at Tulane University, and the founding Director of the university's Hébert Research Center, working on neuroendocrinology and biochemistry research. He died in 2007 of multiple myeloma. His books have been collected by libraries worldwide.

== Career ==
Akira Arimura received his M.D. and Ph.D. in medicine in 1951 and in 1957, respectively, from the Nagoya University School of Medicine, completing his degrees despite a severe bout of pulmonary tuberculosis. Under Professor Shinji Ito, Arimura began his groundbreaking endocrinology dissertation on posterior pituitary hormones, ultimately getting published in Nature (Itoh and Arimura 1954) and attracting global attention. After moving to the United States, he became a Professor in the Department of Medicine in 1970 at Tulane University, and established his own laboratory in 1982. To further scientific relations between the US and Japan, Arimura formed a co-op between the two countries, called the US-Japan Cooperative Biomedical Research Laboratories at Tulane, continuing his research on PACAP and standing as the director of the program to his death.

== Education ==
Arimura graduated from the Zoshikan Academy of the Seventh Higher School and entered the Nagoya University School of Medicine in 1943. Once he graduated and completed an internship at the Nagoya University Hospital in 1956, he was given a Fulbright Fellowship, and he traveled to the United States to continue his research at the Yale University School of Medicine, where Arimura got to know Dr. Andrew V. Schally, and at Tulane University in 1958. Arimura returned to Japan to assist his old professor Ito at the Hokkaido University School of Medicine in 1961, and then moved back to the US to work with Dr. Schally, successfully beating the Schally lab's research competitor, Dr. Roger Guillemin's lab, in the race to purify and characterize the luteinizing-hormone releasing hormone.

== Awards ==
- Medal of Rouen University
