= Akira Hosomi =

Japanese chemist (1943–2018)

- Born: 1943; Osaka, Japan
- Died: 9 September 2018 (aged 74–75); Kyoto, Japan
- Education: Kyoto University
- Occupation: chemist
- Known for: research in organometallic and heteroatom chemistry
- Awards: see section

Akira Hosomi (1943 – 9 September 2018) was a Japanese chemist. He was professor emeritus at Tsukuba University, a fellow of the Chemical Society of Japan, a visiting professor at Chuo University, and an academic advisor at Kyushu University.

== Biography ==
Hosomi was born in Osaka, Japan, in 1943 and educated at Kyoto University. He obtained B. Eng., M. Eng. and Dr. Eng. degrees from Kyoto University under the supervisor of Makoto Kumada in 1965, 1967 and 1970, respectively. He was appointed as an assistant professor in 1970 and an associate professor in 1985 at Tohoku University. He worked with T. G. Traylor at the University of California, San Diego, during 1972-1974, as a visiting scientist. In 1985, he became a full professor of pharmaceutical sciences at Nagasaki University. In 1990, he moved to the department of chemistry (synthetic organic chemistry) of the University of Tsukuba. Afterwards he was the director of the Chemical Analytical Center in 1991–1994, Dean of Graduate School of Chemistry in 1994–1996, Dean of Department of Chemistry and Regent, University of Tsukuba in 1996–1998, and Director of the Isotope Center, University of Tsukuba in 1998-2001. In 2001, he became Dean of the Graduate School of Science and Engineering, University of Tsukuba and Director of the Venture Business Laboratory, University of Tsukuba, and, in 2003, he became Dean of the Graduate School of Pure and Applied Sciences, University of Tsukuba. After the retirement from University of Tsukuba, he became Professor of University Evaluation at the National Institution for Academic Degrees and University Evaluation until 2007. He was adjunct professor of the University of Tsukuba during 2005–2006, and also visiting professor of Gakushuin University during 2006–2009 and Kyoto Pharmaceutical University during 2006–2010. He was also a visiting professor at Chuo University.

Hosomi died on 9 September, 2018, in Kyoto, Japan.

== Awards and honors ==
He received the 26th Chemical Society of Japan Award for Distinguished Young Chemists (Allylsilanes in Organic Synthesis) in 1977, the 6th Inoue Award for Science (Organic Synthesis Using Organosilicon Compounds) in 1990, the 39th Society of Synthetic Organic Chemistry Award, Japan (Fine Organic Synthesis Using Organometallics) in 1997, and the 55th Chemical Society of Japan Award (Development of New Reagents of Silicon and Related Metals and Application to the Practical Organic Synthesis) in 2003, and the Society of Silicon Chemistry JAPAN Award 2012 (Development on New Reagents of Silicon and Related Metals and their Applications to Practical Organic Syntheses). In 2008 he got an honor of the Fellow of the Chemical Society of Japan.

== Research ==
His research interests lies in organometallic and heteroatom chemistry directed towards organic synthesis, synthetic methodology and reaction mechanisms, and organosilicon and organometallic chemistry, heterocyclic chemistry, and bio-organometallic chemistry. He is the author of more than 260 original papers and more than 50 review articles, and 22 books and book chapters. He found various synthetic reactions, e.g., the new transformation reaction from organosilicon compounds to organocopper reagents promoted by copper (I) salt, the "tailor-made" synthesis of non-stabilized 1,3-dipolar reagents, syntheses of the new lantanoid reagents and the ate-compounds of transition metals. He also found new fundamental reaction of organosilyl radicals. Especially he found the Hosomi reaction (the Hosomi-Sakurai) reaction using allylsilanes as one of the famous name reaction. This reaction is carbon-carbon formation using allylsilanes with carbon electrophiles promoted by Lewis acid (A.Hosomi, and H. Sakurai, Tetrahedron Lett. 1976, 1295-1298. A.Hosomi, and H. Sakurai, J. Am. Chem. Soc. 1977, 99, 1673-1674. As a review: A. Hosomi, Acc. Chem.Res., 1988, 21, 200-206.) He anticipates that the allylsilane indicates strong nucleophilicity because of its low ionization potential during the investigation of photoelectron spectra of allylsilanes.
