= Akira Suzuki (disambiguation) =

Akira Suzuki is a Japanese chemist and the creator of the Suzuki reaction.

Akira Suzuki may also refer to:

- Akira Suzuki (director) (すずき あきら), Japanese animator
- Akira Suzuki (writer) (鈴木 明, 1929–2003), Japanese writer and journalist

== See also ==
- Suzuki (disambiguation)
