= Akira Inoue =

Akira Inoue may refer to:

- Akira Inoue (film director) (井上 昭, 1928–2022), Japanese film director
- Akira Inoue (musician) (井上 鑑, born 1953), Japanese keyboardist, composer and producer
