= Li Zhe =

Li Zhe may refer to:

- Emperor Zhongzong of Tang (656–710), named Li Zhe, Chinese emperor of the Tang Dynasty
- Li Zhe (footballer) (born 1981), Chinese football player
- Li Zhe (Go player) (born 1989), Chinese Go player
- Li Zhe (tennis) (born 1989), Chinese tennis player
