= Akira Watanabe =

Akira Watanabe may refer to:

- Akira Watanabe (art director) (渡辺 明, 1908–1999), Japanese special effects art director
- Akira Watanabe (motorcyclist) (渡辺 明, born 1954), Japanese motocross racer
- Akira Watanabe (racing driver) (渡辺 明, born 1954), Japanese racing driver
- Akira Watanabe (Scouting) (渡辺 昭, 1901–2005), Japanese scouting leader
- Akira Watanabe (chess player) (渡辺 暁, born 1972), Japanese political scientist and chess player
- Akira Watanabe (shogi) (渡辺 明, born 1984), Japanese shogi player
- Akira Watanabe, director of the 1987 anime Zillion (anime)

== See also ==
- Watanabe
