= Chul, Lorestan =

Chul چول
- Village
- Location within Iran
- Coordinates: 33°08′09″N 48°37′14″E
- Country: Iran
- Province: Lorestan
- County: Khorramabad
- Bakhsh: Papi
- Rural District: Keshvar

Population (2006)
  - Total: 47
- Time zone: UTC+3:30 (IRST)
  - Summer (DST): UTC+4:30 (IRDT)

Chul (Persian: چول, also Romanized as Chūl) is a village in Keshvar Rural District, Papi District, Khorramabad County, Lorestan Province, Iran. At the 2006 census, its population was 47, in 9 families.
