= Chul, Khuzestan =

Chul چول
- Village
- Location within Iran
- Coordinates: 32°49′57″N 48°28′38″E
- Country: Iran
- Province: Khuzestan
- County: Andimeshk
- Bakhsh: Alvar-e Garmsiri
- Rural District: Qilab

Population (2006)
  - Total: 52
- Time zone: UTC+3:30 (IRST)
  - Summer (DST): UTC+4:30 (IRDT)

Chul (Persian: چول, also Romanized as Chūl) is a village in Qilab Rural District, Alvar-e Garmsiri District, Andimeshk County, Khuzestan Province, Iran. At the 2006 census, its population was 52, in 12 families.
