= Akira Tamura =

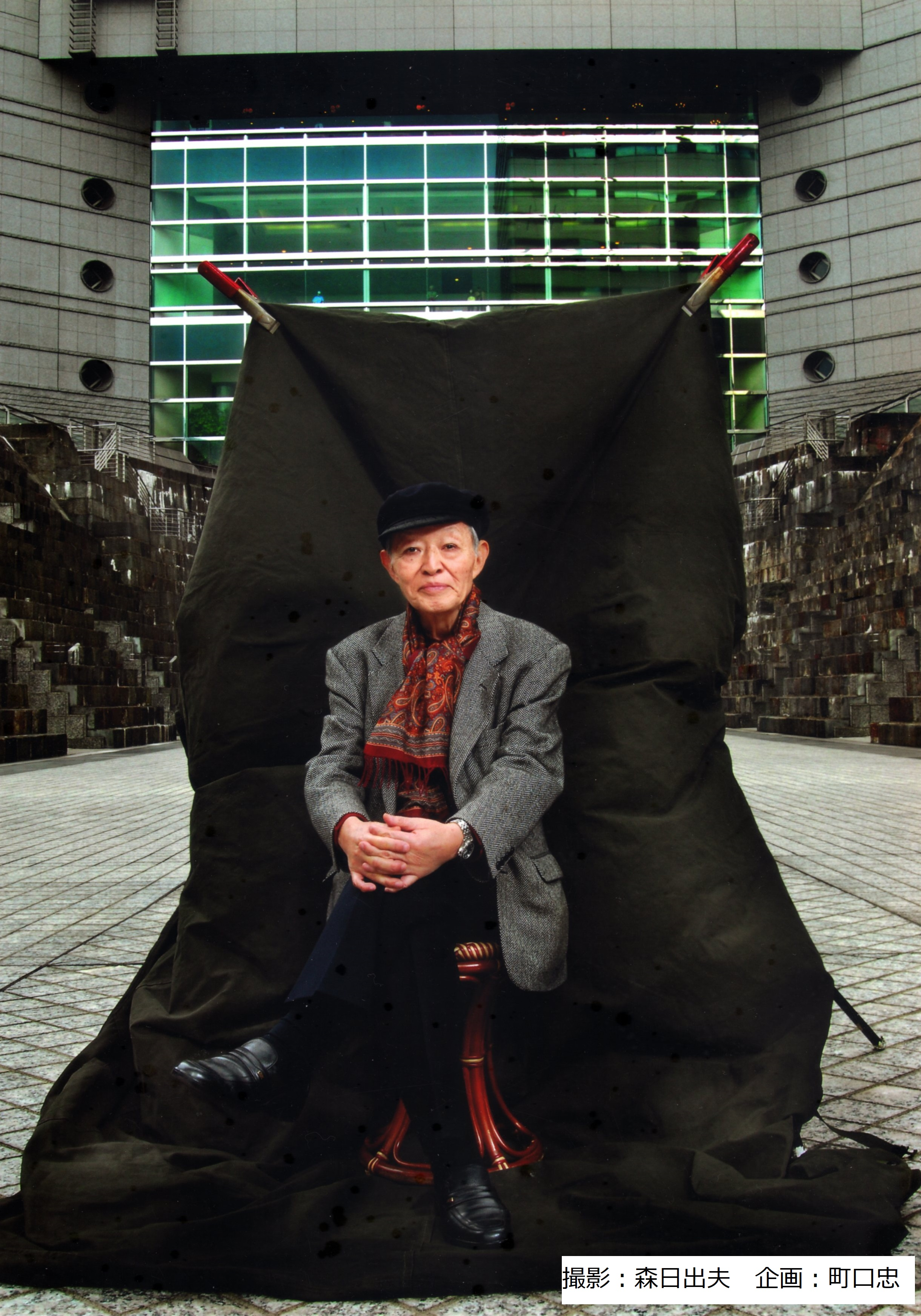
Portrait of Akira Tamura

Akira Tamura (田村明, 1926–2010) was a city planner in postwar Japan. He is notable for two phases of his career: one as the chief city planner of the Yokohama city government and the other as an evangelist of machi-zukuri (town-making) among local movements. Under Japan's then-highly centralized government system, Tamura advocated for the importance of local awareness and initiatives; this led to the strengthening of local government as an institution to achieve a quality environment for all residents. Although he stayed in Yokohama for a relatively brief period, from 1968 to 1981, he achieved some of the most innovative results in Japan's postwar town planning history. His influence on Yokohama's city planning, as well as on local residents throughout Japan, remains visible and notable to this day.

Tamura initially proposed major projects, called the "Six Spine Projects", to transform the structure of Yokohama in 1964, at the request of the newly elected socialist mayor Ichio Asukata. After becoming Yokohama's chief planner at the invitation of Asukata in 1968, Tamura introduced two additional planning measures: building and land control measures and urban design. As a new mechanism to reform the old administrative system, Tamura created the Bureau of Planning and Coordination, which linked the separate bureaus and forged a united entity of city government with a wider mandate.

In 2000, the Architectural Institute of Japan (AIJ), the country's supreme academic institution concerned with architecture and town planning, awarded Tamura its Grand Prize for "the establishment of a theory or technique and its implementation in city planning" (AIJ, 2000), for his work in Yokohama. Tamura remains the only practical planner in the field of city planning to have won the AIJ's Grand Prize; other recipients have all been academics or architects.

Tamura consistently endeavored to educate young planners by assigning them important works. Though he worked in Yokohama for only a short time, those young planners became his followers and passed on his concepts and style of work. This contributed to the success and continuation of projects, land control measures, and urban design. It is said that Tamura was initially not a master planner but gradually learned by listening to the opinions of others. His motto was "amorphous fluidity": he never remained in one place long and was always moving, searching for solutions.

== Early life ==
Akira Tamura was born in 1926 into a Christian middle-class family in Tokyo. As a child, he attended a primary school attached to Aoyama Teachers’ College (now a primary school attached to Tokyo Teachers’ University) and proceeded to the Municipal First Junior High School (now Hibiya High School), both of which remain prestigious schools in Tokyo.

Tamura did not advance to Tokyo's First High School (the premier high school in Japan for the elite before the war). Instead, during the Second World War (1941–1945) he attended Shizuoka High School in 1944, which was several hours away by train from Tokyo. He later explained that he wanted to live outside Tokyo to "broaden his horizons."

Tamura entered Tokyo University in 1945, enrolling in the Department of Architecture in the Faculty of Engineering because he thought that architecture would be a broad field, encompassing both arts and social science. His graduation thesis was titled A Study of the Change of Structure in a Big City. His dissertation adviser, a young associate professor named Kenzo Tange, went on to become a world-famous architect. During his studies, Tamura met Takashi Asada, a senior staff member in Tange's office at that time, who exerted a strong influence on Tamura. Asada was seven years older than Tamura and also intended to become a city planner.

== Early career ==
After his graduation, Tamura worked for one and a half years as an official in the Ministry of Transportation in charge of inbound travel planning. In addition, he studied in the Faculty of Law at the University of Tokyo and earned a bachelor's degree in law. After he left the Ministry of Transportation, he continued to seek a post in other ministries. After several challenging positions in various ministries, he moved to Osaka.

Real estate was regarded as a good investment when the Japanese economy was recovering in the 1950s. Nissay Life Insurance Mutual Company, the country's biggest life insurance firm, needed a specialist in real estate development, and Tamura seemed eminently qualified for this position. Tamura spent nine years in this position. During this time, married Makiko Saito, who was from the same Christian nonchurch movement (initiated by Kanzo Uchimura) as Tamura.

However, Tamura was not satisfied with his life as a salaried worker in a big company, and he wondered whether his vocation lay elsewhere. He recognized that his work in estate development only benefited his firm and was not his calling. He visited Tange to discuss his future; at that time, he again met Asada, who was now the facilitator of the "metabolism" architecture. Asada subsequently started Japan's first city-planning consulting firm in 1961.

Tamura began working as a part-time employee, returning to Tokyo every weekend. In January 1963, he returned to Tokyo to join the Environmental Development Center, Asada's planning firm, as one of only three staff members. Before starting there, Tamura wrote a proposal paper entitled Positioning of Regional Planning Machinery, emphasizing the importance of expert planners and urban designers.

== Chief city planner in Yokohama and the Six Spine Projects ==
In 1964, Tamura proposed the Six Spine Projects. This endeavor reconstructed the basic urban structure of the city on its devastated urban land, just after the land was at last returned by the occupation armies. The mayor, Asukata, thought it necessary to establish a new section of the city government to oversee the Six Spine Projects, which would require a new planning approach and coordination across internal sections and external institutions. Thus, Tamura founded a new bureau, Planning and Coordinating Bureau, a kind of secretariat for the mayor in charge of planning. Tamura became the chief of this section.

Tamura's first conflict with the national bureaucracy concerned the motorway, whose structure was originally to be elevated. Thanks to Tamura's efforts, this was successfully changed to a half-underground structure to preserve the landscape. After this success, Tamura consolidated his position in the administration. It has since become common among local government officials to become confident and independent as equal partners with the national ministries.

Tamura developed a new planning policy to integrate the Six Spine Projects with building and land control measures and urban design. These measures were combined to form a strategic planning tool for local government. Fumihiko Maki, an architect and urban designer who had just returned from teaching and practicing urban design in the United States, served as an adviser to Tamura. Maki worked on several urban design projects, including the Kanazawa reclamation project and its housing development, assigned by Tamura. It soon became clear that urban design needed an in-house team, since it had to handle cumbersome coordination among the city administration and concerned parties. In 1970, Shunsuke Iwasaki returned from an urban design course at Harvard University and joined Tamura's team. Tamura and his staff worked over these main objectives as follows:

- Minatomirai 21: Central business and commercial district redevelopment on the site of an old shipyard and freight train yard in the harbor area
- Kohoku: New town development with landscaped housing and urban agriculture districts through land readjustment as a model housing against urban sprawl
- Kanazawa seaside reclamation development: New seaside industrial and housing development accommodating the relocation of small factories moved from built-up inland areas with state-of-the-art antipollution provisions
- Local development exaction system: an innovative development control measure by the local government discretion to require developers to donate land for parks and community facilities
- Urban motorway network: Landscape-conscious motorway network planned and coordinated by the local initiative with part of its network underground
- Strategic use of the Town Planning Law of 1968: Widely zoned nonurban areas of Yokohama being used for urban agriculture
- Urban design: Pedestrian-conscious spaces designed, planned, and coordinated to maximize the natural landscape and historical buildings

Half a century has now passed since Tamura proposed the Six Spine Projects, and they have mostly been completed. It is noteworthy that the Six Spine Projects survived and were implemented by the four mayors who succeeded Asukata, none of whom were socialists.

== Adviser of local town-making movement ==
Asukata was elected to a fourth term as mayor, but his term ended abruptly when he became the new chairman of the Japan Socialist Party in 1978 and left Yokohama. Michikazu Saigo, Asukata's successor, won the mayoral election in 1978 with backing from both conservatives and socialists. He appointed Tamura to a nominal post. Although Saigo recognized the importance of the Six Spine Project, he did not believe that they should not be under the control of a single individual, even Tamura.

After completing his doctoral thesis, Local Development Exaction System, After obtaining his PhD from the University of Tokyo, Tamura became a professor of the Faculty of Law of Hosei University, a private university in Tokyo. He then launched a campaign to increase public awareness among people with an interest in local community by writing three books: Town-Making in Concept (1987), Town-Making in Practice (1995), and Town-Making and Townscape (2005). These three books are still widely read. In all, he wrote 11 books during his 15 years at Hosei University.

It was during this time that Tamura started using the term machi-zukuri (town-making) instead of "city planning," because the latter sounded to him like a "top-down" initiative from the national bureaucracy, whereas the former conveyed the idea of a grassroots activity by residents.

Tamura died at the age of 84, on January 25, 2010, with his wife, Makiko, at his side in his bedroom in Atagawa, Izu district, Shizuoka prefecture. His life was enriched by the pleasure he derived from town-making, and his wife suggested that his Christian faith had a strong influence on him.

== Influence ==
Even though Tamura authored over 40 books, empirical research on his works would strengthen his unparalleled achievement and provide younger generations materials to learn. Tamura was not inherently a theorist of city planning, but developed his own town-making theory by addressing the needs and circumstances of Yokohama.

Tamura developed his advisory activities for the public by going on a "pilgrimage" as an evangelist of town-making all over Japan, persuading citizens and local government workers to become confident in their local quality. Tamura put a higher priority on his relationship with ordinary citizens. Moreover, he was engaged in the foundation of the Japan Association of Local Government Policy Studies.

Tamura also helped young people form voluntary study groups on town-making in local areas all over Japan, consisting of residents, scholars, and local government workers. These activities are continuing even today. The non-profit organization "Akira Tamura Memorial—A Town Planning Research Initiative" was established in 2015. Although the NPO was not founded by Tamura himself, it retains the same atmosphere of the study groups as he started. To this day there are young people who, after reading Tamura's books, gain the confidence and opportunity to work locally with a wider perspective, and go on to become local government workers or community planners.

== Sources ==
- City of Yokohama (1982). Yokohama: Portrait of a City from Its Port Opening to the 21st Century. Booklet prepared for the Regional Congress of Local Authorities for Development of Human Settlements in Asia and the Pacific, organized by ESCAP, HABITAT, and the City of Yokohama.
- Taguchi, Toshio (2017). "A Chronological Study Regarding the Planning Process of the Central District of Minatomirai 21, a Waterfront Redevelopment Project in Yokohama, at Its Inception Stage." Journal of Architectural Planning, AIJ 82 (735): 1175–1185.
- Taguchi, Toshio (2018). "The Adoption and Abolition of the Local Development Exaction System by the City of Yokohama." Journal of Architectural Planning, AIJ 83 (753): 2173–2183.
- Tamura, Akira (1981). "Urban Development Control by Local Development Exaction System." PhD thesis, Tokyo University.
- Tamura, Akira (2006). Making Yokohama City Planning Work with Tamura. Gakugei.
