= Akira Takeuchi =

Akira Takeuchi may refer to:

- Akira Takeuchi (athlete) (竹内 章; born 1947), Japanese Olympic athlete
- Akira Takeuchi (fashion designer) (武内 昭; born 1977), Japanese fashion designer, founded the Theatre Products brand
- Akira Takeuchi (footballer) (竹内 彬; born 1983), Japanese footballer
