= Tetsu =

- Gender: Male

Origin
- Origin: Japanese
- Meaning: Different meanings depending on the kanji used

Tetsu (written: 哲, 徹, 鉄 or テツ in katakana) is a masculine Japanese given name. Notable people with the name include:

- Tetsu Iida (飯田 鉄; born 1948), Japanese photographer
- Tetsu Inada (稲田 徹; born 1972), Japanese voice actor
- Tetsu Inoue (テツ・イノウエ), Japanese musician
- Tetsu Katayama (片山 哲; 1887–1978), Japanese politician and Prime Minister of Japan
- Tetsu Komai (駒井 哲; 1894–1970), Japanese-American actor
- Tetsu Nagasawa (長澤 徹; born 1968), Japanese footballer and manager
- Tetsu Nakamura (中村 哲, 1946–2019), Japanese physician
- Tetsu Nakamura (actor) (中村 哲, 1909–1992), Japanese film actor and opera singer
- Tetsu Nishikawa (西川 哲; born 1968), Japanese golfer
- Tetsu Sawaki (沢木 哲; born 1982), Japanese actor
- Tetsu Shiratori (白鳥 哲; born 1972), Japanese voice actor
- Tetsu Sugiyama (杉山 哲; born 1981), Japanese footballer
- Tetsu Takano (高野 哲; born 1972), Japanese musician
- Tetsu Watanabe (渡辺 哲; born 1950), Japanese actor
- Tetsu Yamauchi (山内 テツ; 1946–2025), real name Tetsuo Yamauchi, Japanese musician
- Tetsu Yano (矢野 徹; 1923–2004), Japanese science fiction translator and writer
- Tetsushi Mizokami (born 1948), Japanese founder of Uncle Tetsu's Cheesecake
- Tetsuya (musician) (born 1969), formerly known as Tetsu, a musician

== See also ==
- Tetsuzō Iwamoto (1916–1955), Sub-Lieutenant fighter plane ace during World War II
- Tetsu (railfan) - Short for tetsudōfan (鉄道ファン), literally "railway fan" in Japanese.
