= Chul (Korean name) =

- Hangul: 철
- RR: Cheol
- MR: Ch'ŏl

Chul, also spelled Cheol or Chol, is a Korean given name. Notable people with the name include:

- Chŏng Ch'ŏl (1536–1593), Joseon dynasty statesman and poet
- Kim Chol (c. 1960–2012), North Korean politician
- Kang Chul (born 1971), South Korean football player
- Park Chul (born 1973), South Korean football manager
- Woo Chul (born 1978), South Korean swimmer
- Kim Chul (born 1980), South Korean field hockey player
- Hong Chul (born 1990), South Korean football player
- Pak Chol (born 1990), North Korean long-distance runner
- DinDin (born Lim Cheol, 1991), South Korean rapper
- Ahn Chol, North Korean freelance journalist

Fictional characters with the name Chul include:

- Kang Cheol, brother of Player 067 (Kang Sae-byeok) in the 2021 South Korean drama Squid Game

== See also ==
- List of Korean given names
