= Yamaguchi clan =

Common name of Japanese clans

The Yamaguchi clan (山口氏, Yamaguchi-shi) was a common name endorsed by several clans in Japan that claim descent from different origins.

== Yamaguchi clan (Chūgoku) ==
Yamaguchi 山口
- The Yamaguchi clan of Chūgoku shared its emblem (mon) with the Ōuchi clan
- Home province: Yamaguchi Prefecture
- Parent house: Ōuchi clan; Tatara clan
- Titles: Various
- Founder: Yamaguchi Mochimori (山口持盛)

Also known as the "Ushiku Yamaguchi (牛久山口)", the Yamaguchi clan of the Chūgoku region, specifically in present-day Yamaguchi Prefecture, was a Japanese clan that traced its roots to the Ōuchi clan (and in some cases, the Tatara clan) and is considered the most influential Yamaguchi clan in Japanese history with many modern people tracing their roots to it. They later became the lords of the Ushiku Domain, a feudal domain under the Tokugawa shogunate of Edo period Japan, located in Hitachi Province (modern-day Ibaraki Prefecture), Japan.

The clan was founded by Yamaguchi Mochimori (山口持盛) in the Muromachi period. Yamaguchi Mochimori (also known as Ōuchi Mochimori) was a member of the Ōuchi clan, one of the most powerful and important families in Western Japan during the reign of the Ashikaga shogunate in the 14th to 16th centuries. He almost became the heir to the Ōuchi clan, but soon abandoned the idea and found his own clan. His son, Yamaguchi Moriyuki (山口盛幸) became the first individual to get the Yamaguchi name officially recognized. Around this time, the powerful Ōuchi clan's influence was starting to wane due to the Tainei-ji incident which ultimately caused the clan's downfall. After the fall of the parent clan by the hands of the Sue clan and later, the Mōri clan, the Yamaguchi clan lost its prior glory of being descendants of the once powerful Ōuchi clan, resorting to becoming retainers to the Tokugawa shogunate in later years.

Due to the parent clan's fallen reputation and their loss of jurisdiction, Moriyuki's son, Yamaguchi Shigemasa (山口重政), eventually became a retainer to Tokugawa Ieyasu. Shigemasa worked his way to becoming a daimyo after impressing Tokugawa of his strategic prowess in the Battle of Sekigahara. For his efforts in the war, he was given 5,000 koku of Kazusa Province, and 5,000 koku of Musashi Province which made him eligible for being a daimyo. In 1611, he was given an additional 5,000 koku of Shimotsuke Province. However, on January 6, 1613, Shigemasa was stripped of his daimyo position due to his involvement in the Ōkubo Nanayasu incident, but due to his efforts in the Siege of Osaka, he was given 15,000 koku of Tōtōmi Province in 1629 which made him a daimyo again.

Shigemasa's son and second daimyo, Yamaguchi Hirotaka (山口弘隆) gifted his brother Yamaguchi Shigetsune (山口重恒) 5,000 koku of his Tōtōmi Province in 1635. During his reign, his domain was consolidated into Hitachi and Shimōsa provinces, and in 1669, he established the Ushiku Domain. The Ushiku Domain continued to be controlled by the Yamaguchi clan until it was abolished and established as a prefecture. The last lord of the domain, Yamaguchi Hirotatsu (山口弘達), was appointed governor of Ushiku Domain on June 23, 1869, and when the domain was returned to the Emperor, he served as governor until it was abolished and established as a prefecture on July 15, 1871. The placenames that share the pronunciation of the "Yamaguchi" are based on the Yamaguchi clan.

On June 17, 1869, administrative officials unified the nobility and feudal lords to create the peerage system, and the Yamaguchi family was also ranked as a daimyo family. On July 7, 1884, the Peers' Club act (華族令; かぞくれい) was enacted, and the peerage system was divided into five noble families. On July 8, Hirotatsu, as the governor of a former small domain, was ranked as a viscount. Hirotatsu served as a professor at Gakushuin and was elected as a viscount member of the House of Peers.

The legacy was later incorporated into the city of Yamaguchi.

== Yamaguchi clan (Owari) ==
Yamaguchi 山口
- Home province: Owari Province
- Parent house: Ōuchi clan; Tatara clan

Also known as the "Owari Yamaguchi (尾張山口)", the Yamaguchi clan was another cadet branch of the Ōuchi clan, similar to the Yamaguchi clan of Chūgoku, it adopted the Yamaguchi name due to the parent clan's name "Ōuchi" being prohibited by the Mōri clan after the latter successfully overthrew it.

The clan had jurisdiction over the Owari Province, but was relatively weaker than the sister clan of the Chūgoku region of the same name.

== Yamaguchi clan (Kofun period) ==
Yamaguchi 山口
- Titles: Various
- Founder: Yamaguchi no Sukune (山口宿禰)

The Yamaguchi clan of the Kofun period descended from Yamaguchi no Sukune (山口宿禰), the son of Yamaki no Atai (山木直) who in turn was the son of Tsuka no Omi (都加使主).

It is said that Tsuka no Omi came from Paekche with his father, Achi no Omi, who was considered as a brilliant scholar and the same person who introduced Wani to Emperor Ōjin during the Kofun period.

Yamaguchi no Sukune descends from the aforementioned Yamaki no Atai, who is in fact the older brother to Shido no Atai (志努直), the founder of the Yamato no Aya clan. Therefore, it can be considered that the Yamaguchi clan and the Yamato no Aya clan were related.

== Yamaguchi clan (Sakanoue) ==
Yamaguchi 山口
- Parent house: Sakanoue clan
- Titles: Various
- Founder: Yamaguchi no Atai (山口直)

The Sakanoue clan had a branch clan that was called the Yamaguchi clan.

It is said that the clan descends from Yamaguchi no Atai (山口直) and were related to the Yamaguchi clan of the Kofun period, as Yamaguchi no Atai was a distant relative of Yamaguchi no Sukune, and both being descendants of Achi no Omi.

Furthermore, due to the Sakanoue clan being a cadet branch clan of the Yamato no Aya clan, it can be considered as a lateral branch clan of the famous Aya clan.

== Yamaguchi clan (ancient) ==
Yamaguchi 山口
- Parent house: Hata clan (波多氏)
- Titles: Various
- Founder: Yamaguchi no Inukai (山口犬養)

An ancient clan named the Yamaguchi clan was founded by Yamaguchi no Inukai (山口犬養), a descendant of Hata no Yashiro (羽田矢代), the son of the famous Takenouchi no Sukune, who was also the founder of the Hata clan (波多氏; related to the Hata clan).

Later, the Sakanoue clan's Yamaguchi clan shared its titles such as Atai, Ason, and Imiki, with the Hata-related Yamaguchi clan which amalgamated the two clans that had foreign origins.

Due to the Hata clan (波多氏) being considered as the parent clan of the more famous Hata clan of the same name, it can be considered that the Yamaguchi clan under Hata no Yashiro and the Hata clans are related.

== Yamaguchi clan (Taira) ==
Yamaguchi 山口
- Parent house: Taira clan
- Founder: Yamaguchi Ietsugu (山口家継)

Also known as the "Musashi Yamaguchi (武蔵山口)", the Yamaguchi clan was founded by Yamaguchi Ietsugu (山口家継) who was a member of the Taira clan that descended from Emperor Kanmu, the 50th emperor of Japan.

It was a samurai clan that ruled Yamaguchi, Iruma County, Musashi Province (present-day Yamaguchi, Tokorozawa, Saitama Prefecture) from the end of the Heian period to the Sengoku period.

== Yamaguchi clan (Minamoto) ==
Yamaguchi 山口
- Parent house: Akai clan (赤井氏)
- Founder: Yamaguchi Naoyuki (山口直之)

The family was founded by Yamaguchi Naoyuki (山口直之), the fourth son of Akai Tokiie (赤井時家), who broke away from the Akai clan (赤井氏), a cadet branch of the Minamoto family, and took control of Yamaguchi in Shinano Province (present-day Yamaguchi, Nakatsugawa, Gifu Prefecture).

Naoyuki's eldest son, Yamaguchi Naotomo (山口直友), became a hatamoto of the Tokugawa shogunate, and Naotomo's younger brother, Yamaguchi Naoyuki (山口直行), served the Shimazu clan.

== See also ==
- Japanese clans
