= Sakanoue no Karitamaro =

Japanese general

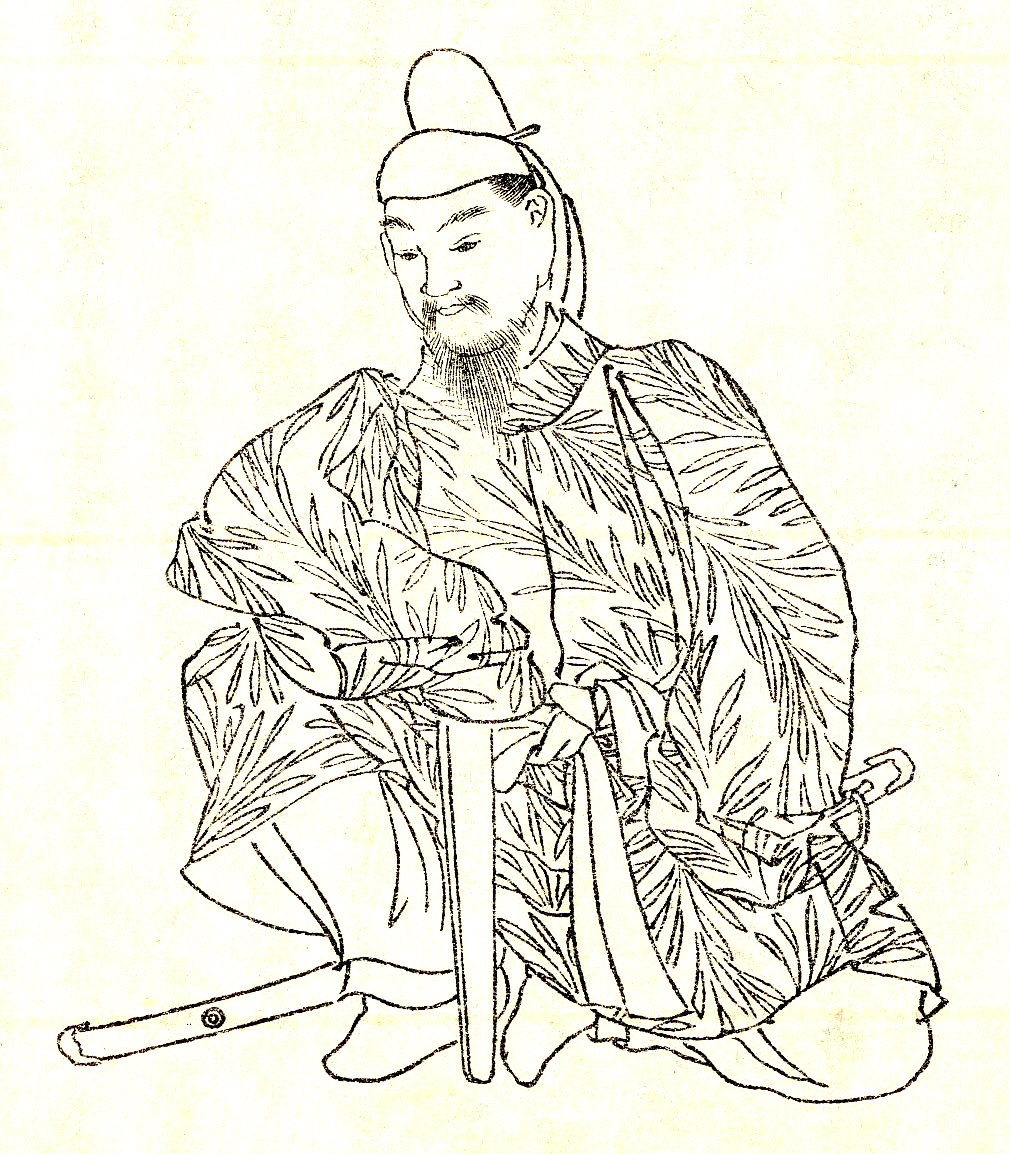
Illustration by Kikuchi Yōsai, from Zenken Kojitsu

Sakanoue no Karitamaro (坂上 苅田麿; 727 – February 14, 786) was a samurai commander, and later chinjufu-shōgun (Commander-in-chief of the defense of the North), during Japan's Nara period.

Karitomo's father was Sakanoue no Inukai of the Sakanoue clan.

In 764, Karitamaro aided in the repression of a revolt by Fujiwara no Nakamaro.

Karitomo's son was Tamuramaro, the first to hold the title Sei-i Taishōgun.

== See also ==
- Sakanoue clan
- Yamato no Aya clan
- Shinsen Shōjiroku
