= Achi no Omi =

- 阿知使主
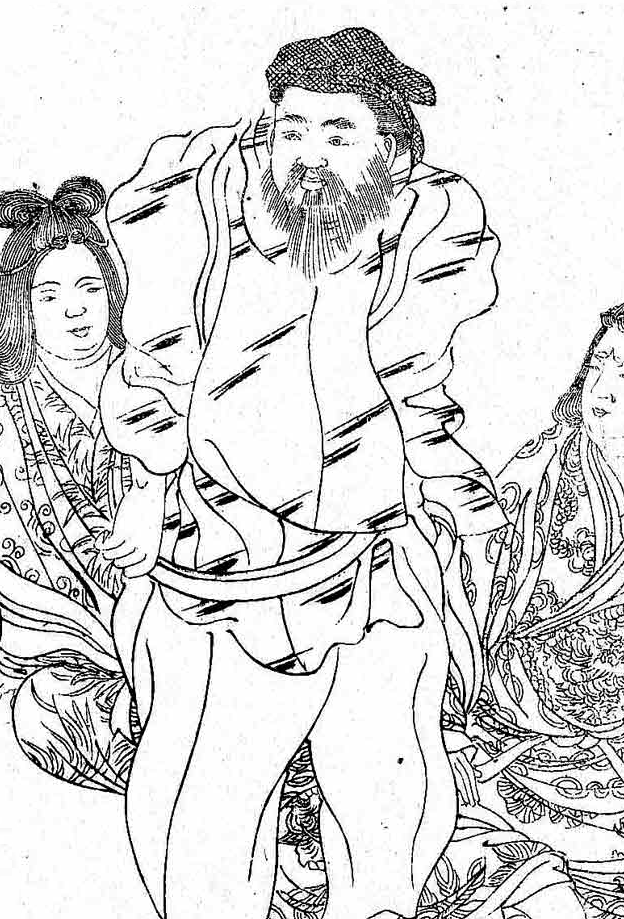
- Depiction of Achi no Omi by Kikuchi Yōsai from Zenken Kojitsu (1903)
- Pronunciation: あちのおみ
- Born: 3rd century? Paekche
- Died: Japan
- Other names: Achikishi (阿知吉師; あちきし); Achiki (阿直岐; あちき); Achi no Ō (阿智王; あちのおう)
- Occupations: Scholar; Instructor; Expatriate; Clan leader
- Family: Ōtomo clan (disputed); Yamato no Aya clan

Achi no Omi (阿知使主; 3rd–5th century CE) also known Achikishi (阿知吉師) as well as Achiki (阿直岐) or Achi no Ō (阿智王), was the legendary founder of the Yamato no Aya clan, an immigrant clan in ancient Japan who hailed from the kingdom of Paekche with his son Tsuka no Omi (都加使主). He is not to be confused with another individual named "Achi no Omi (安致臣)" found in the Nihon Shoki.

He is considered one of the three most influential Toraijins alongside Yuzuki no Kimi and Wani during the Kofun period.

== History ==
Originally from the kingdom of Paekche, he is first mentioned in the Kojiki (under Achikishi) as a stable master who took care of the horses brought over from Paekche.

『亦、百濟國主照古王、以牡馬壹疋・牝馬壹疋付阿知吉師以貢上。〔此阿知吉師者 阿直史等之祖〕』

"King Geunchogo of Baekje also gave Achikishi a stallion and a mare as tribute. (This Achikishi was the ancestor of Achishi and others.)"

— Kojiki

He is later mentioned again in the Nihon Shoki when discussing about his arrival in Japan. It parrots the same reason for his immigration to Japan from Paekche, but this time, under two different variations of his name: Achiki and Achi no Omi.

『百濟王遣阿直伎。貢良馬二匹。卽養於輕坂上廐、因以阿直岐令掌飼。故號其養馬之處、曰廐坂也。阿直岐亦能讀經典、卽太子菟道稚郎子師焉。於是天皇問阿直岐曰、如勝汝博士亦有耶、對曰、有王仁者、是秀也。時遣上毛野君祖荒田別・巫別於百濟、仍徵王仁也。其阿直岐者、阿直岐史之始祖也。』

"The King of Paekche sent Achiki (Achi no Omi) to deliver two horses. He was stationed at a stable in Karu where he took care of the horses. He was a master of reading scriptures and was placed as the mentor to Ujinowakiiratsuko. One day, the Emperor of Japan asked him "is there someone more talented than yourself?" and he replied, "a great scholar named Wani". The emperor dispatched his men to bring Wani from Paekche. He is also the ancestor of Achikishi (阿直岐史)."

— Nihon Shoki, June 4th year of the Enryaku era

『廿年 秋九月、倭漢直祖阿知使主、其子都加使主、並率己之黨類十七縣、而來歸焉。』

"20th year, Autumn, September. Achi no Omi, ancestor of the Atahe of the Aya of Yamato, and his son Tsuka no Omi immigrated to Japan, bringing with them a company of their people of seventeen districts."

— Nihon Shoki, September of the 20th year

He has three descendants depending on the source: Achishi or Achi no Fumi (阿直史; Kojiki), Achikishi (阿直岐史; Nihon Shoki), and Tsuka no Omi (都加使主; Nihon Shoki). It is unclear if all of them are related to one another, despite having names that sound similar. Interestingly, one of the descendants, Achikishi (阿直岐史), possess the same pronunciation of Achi no Omi's oldest name, Achikishi (阿知吉師), but under different characters (阿直/阿知) and titles (岐史/吉師).

== Origin ==
Due to conflicting details across several sources that claim different origins of Achi no Omi, several theories have been proposed by modern historians.

In the earliest accounts such as the Kojiki (712) and the Nihon Shoki (720) state that Achi no Omi and his clan had originated from the kingdom of Paekche.

However, according to Shoku Nihongi (797), it is said that he was the great-grandson of Emperor Ling of Han which is the reason why his clan was named "東漢" meaning "Eastern Han" in Chinese characters. In contrast, according to the claim made by the Sakanoue clan, Yamato no Aya's cadet branch clan, Achi no Omi was a descendant of Emperor Xian of Han being either his grandson or great grandson and not Emperor Ling in the Shinsen Shōjiroku (815). These claims made by blood relatives (Yamato no Aya–Sakanoue) conflict with each other causing genealogical confusion among modern historians.

It is very likely that the added information and claims are aggrandizations made by the authors to emphasize the clan's importance as older sources (Kojiki & Nihon Shoki) do not mention anything about Achi no Omi being related to Chinese royalty. According to historian Hiroshi Kurita (栗田 寛), it was common for Korean descendants to rely on prominent families for their lineage in order to raise their social status. (Note: 『社会的地位を引き上げるために、往々にして朝鮮系が名族に世系を仮託することはよくみられる現象である。』 "It is a common phenomenon for people of Korean descent to rely on noble families for their lineage in order to raise their social status." — 栗田 寛)

Modern Japanese scholars have indicated that Yamato no Aya clan and other "Aya (漢)" clans were all related and that they were generally classified under the same ethnic group. These mainly included: the Aya clan (漢氏), the Ayahito clan (漢人氏), the Yamato no Aya clan (東漢氏/倭漢氏) and the Kawachinoaya clan (西漢氏/河内漢氏). It is said that Yamato no Aya clan, Aya and Kawachinoaya, though not from the same founder, were ethnically related, most likely all immigrating from Paekche.

Source	Year	Claim
Kojiki	712	Written under "Achikishi (阿知吉師)", he was sent to Japan from Paekche and suggested/introduced Wani to the Yamato kingship as a fellow mentor.
Nihon Shoki	720	Written under "Achiki (阿直岐)" and "Achi no Omi (阿知使主)", it also states the same information as the Kojiki. It also adds that he immigrated to Japan from Paekche with his son Tsuka no Omi and their people from seventeen districts, and founded the Yamato no Aya clan.
Shoku Nihongi	797	Written under "Achi no Omi (阿智使主)", it adds the claim that he is a descendant of Emperor Ling of Han (through the Yamato no Aya clan).
Shinsen Shōjiroku	815	Written under "Achi no Ō (阿智王)", it adds the claim that he is a descendant of Emperor Xian of Han (through the Sakanoue clan).

Regardless of the claims found in the sources, the truth surrounding Achi no Omi and the other prominent immigrants such as Wani and Yuzuki no Kimi remain skeptical with modern historians considering them as fictional individuals whose stories were added later to help create origin stories for clans with foreign backgrounds.

== Name ==
Achi no Omi's name is often referenced differently depending on the source with four names in particular, "Achikishi", "Achiki", "Achi no Omi", and "Achi no Ō" being the main four candidates.

Chronology of Achi no Omi's names
Names	Sources	Notes
Achikishi (阿知吉師)	Kojiki (712)	"-Kishi" title is first introduced. Said to be the ancestor to Achishi (阿直史).
Achiki (阿直岐) Achi no Omi (阿知使主)	Nihon Shoki (720)	"Achiki" variant is first introduced. The "知" character is changed to "直", seen previously in his descendant's name in the Kojiki. (阿知→阿直) "-Omi" title is first introduced.
Achi no Omi (阿知使主)	Shoku Nihongi (797)	-
Achi no Omi (阿智使主) Achi no Ō (阿智王)	Shinsen Shōjiroku (815)	"Achi no Omi" is written differently and is a name claimed by the Yamato no Aya clan. The "知" character is changed to "智". (阿知→阿智) "-Ō" title is first introduced and is a name claimed by the Sakanoue clan.

All of his names share the "Achi (あち)" pronunciation; however, depending on the character, some are confused as to whether these names were alluding to the same individual. In essence, the oldest name "Achikishi" is represented by the "阿知" characters in the Kojiki. This name is referenced again in the Nihon Shoki under "Achi no Omi" alongside another name, "Achiki" with the same pronunciation, but different spelling under "阿直". Though the premise of both names are similar, it is not specifically stated in the Nihon Shoki that these two are the same people, nor does it specify any instances that allude to the possibility of them being related. However, due to the Kojiki claiming that an individual of a similar name "Achishi (阿直史)" was the descendant of "Achikishi (Achi no Omi)", it can be deduced that "Achi" under "阿直" or "阿知" are in fact related. Furthermore, it is said that the Sakanoue clan's stables are related to the stables brought by Achiki from Paekche which supports the theory that Achiki and Achi no Omi were indeed the same individual. (Note: 『阿直伎と坂上の厩が結び付いていますから、阿直伎と坂上氏も同族ということになり、阿直岐は漢人の祖、阿智使主の別名とすることができます。』 "Since Achiki and Sakanoue clan's stables are connected, Achiki and the Sakanoue clan are also of the same clan, and Achiki can be considered another name for Achi no Omi, the ancestor of the Aya clans." — 塚田 敬章, 帰化人 漢氏と文氏)

== Titles ==
The "-kishi (吉師)" title in "Achikishi" is believed to be an allusion to the title "-gilji (吉支)", or "-kichi" in Old Korean, of Paekche when addressing their royalty, specifically to that of the king. In Paekche, the king was called "Geongilji (Korean: 건길지; Hanja: 鞬吉支; RR: Geongilji; MR: Kŏn'gilchi)" and it is believed that the title was given to Achikishi when depicting him of Paekche descent (also seen in Wanikishi).

The "-Omi (使主)" title in "Achi no Omi" is a variation of "Omi (臣)" a title under the Kabane system. However, the variation found in Achi no Omi's name is widely considered a version reserved more for Toraijins (immigrants). It is also shared by fellow individuals from Korea known as Mantoku no Omi from Goguryeo, Zenna no Omi (善那使主), as well as Tsurugamashi no Omi (津留牙使主) and his descendant, Sue no Omi (末使主) from Paekche, adding credence to his Korean origin.

This sentiment is further examined in his alternate name, "Achi no Ō (阿智王)" or "King Achi" despite not referencing him of being royalty. It is believed that Achi no Omi and other invented clan founders were given the "King" title (also seen in Yuzuki no Ō) to elevate their importance in their respective clan's founding stories.

== Legacy ==
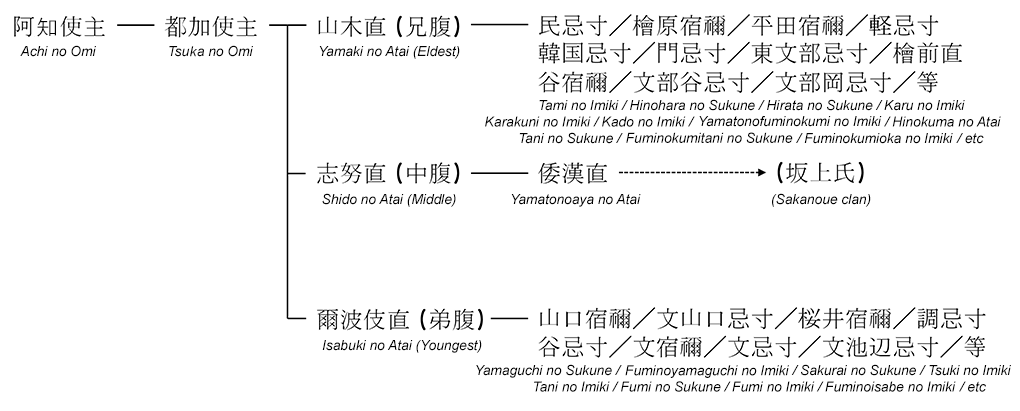
Genealogy of Achi no Omi and his descendants.

Achi no Omi's son, Tsuka no Omi became father to three sons; Yamaki no Atai (山木直), Shido no Atai (志努直), and Isabuki no Atai (爾波伎直), who all became ancestors to many powerful clans including the Yamato no Aya clan, Sakanoue clan, and many more. They all trace their lineage to Tsuka no Omi and thus, Achi no Omi.

The Yamato no Aya clan, became the parent clan to many of its cadet branches including the famous Sakanoue clan. The said clan became famous for Sakanoue no Tamuramaro, who became a loyal servant to Emperor Kanmu where many of his children married into the imperial family.

It is also said that Achi no Omi was in fact the ancestor to the Ōtomo clan, another immigrant clan from Korea, according to the Sakanoue clan's genealogy. However, due to the conflicting claims made by the Sakanoue clan and the Ōtomo clan itself in regards to their respective founders, (Note: The Ōtomo clan claims that Mantoku no Omi, a Goguryeo individual was their founder.) it is considered unlikely that Achi no Omi was the founder of the Ōtomo clan.

== See also ==
- Yamato no Aya clan: Achi no Omi's clan.
- Toraijin
  - Wani
  - Yuzuki no Kimi
