= Shinsen Shōjiroku =

Imperially commissioned Japanese genealogical record

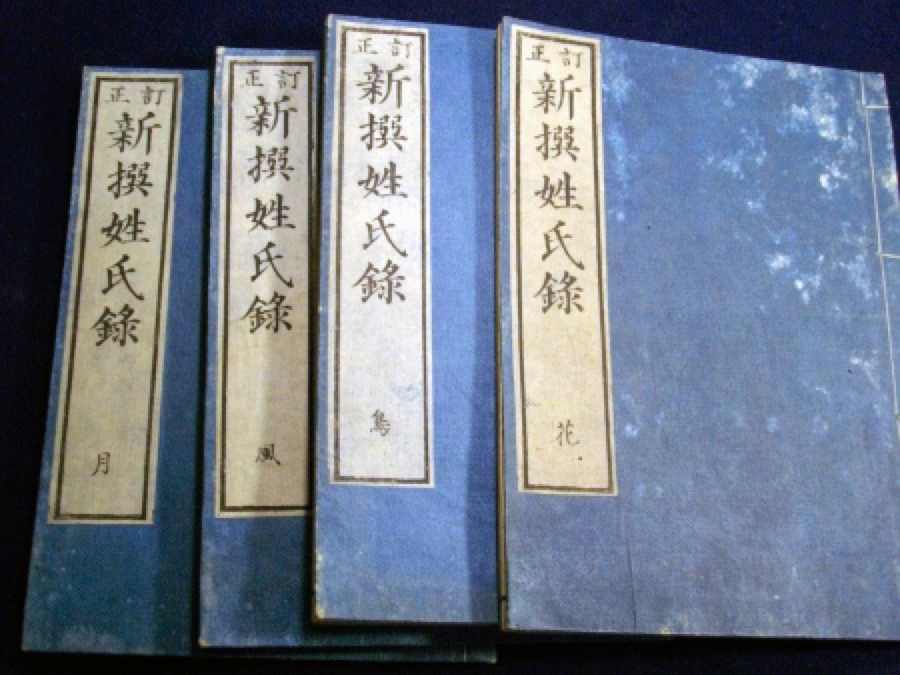
- The abridged version of the lost Shinsen Shōjiroku and the only remaining contents of the book today.
- Original title: しんせんしょうじろく (新撰姓氏録)
- Language: Classical Chinese
- Subject: History of Japan
- Genre: Ancient history
- Publication date: 815
- Publication place: Japan

Shinsen Shōjiroku (新撰姓氏録; "Newly Selected Record of Hereditary Titles and Family Names") (Note: The book title is "Newly Selected (新撰) Shōjiroku (姓氏録)". But the book Shōjiroku hadn't existed formerly. There was the plan to compile a book which had the same purpose, but was not completed. Therefore, the book compiled and completed had the name with "newly selected".) was an imperially commissioned Japanese genealogical record from Heian period Japan.

The book itself has been lost, but its abridged version and fragments remain.

== History ==
It was first conceived during Emperor Kanmu's reign in 799 to properly track the clans' then ambiguous lineages, but was not completed before his death in 806. The project was later carried over by his son, Emperor Saga. Thirty volumes in length, it was compiled by the Emperor's brother, Imperial Prince Manda (万多親王, 788–830) and by the late Emperor Kanmu's associates such as Fujiwara no Otsugu, and Fujiwara no Sonohito et al. It was initially completed in 814, but underwent a revision to be recompleted in 815.

The original book is believed to have existed until the Kamakura period, but only its abridged version that supposedly contains 1/10 of the information survives today. The abridged version includes the preface and table of contents from the original as well as very brief summaries of the clans and their lineages.

All of the information provided is based on the abridged version.

== Contents ==
According to the preface, the record contains genealogical records for 1182 families living in the Heian-kyō capital and the Kinai region (encompassing Izumi [和泉], Kawachi [河内], Settsu [摂津], Yamashiro [山城], Yamato [和]), which means "close to capital"; but the preface warns even this record comprises less than half of all the surnames in circulation there.

The four main categories in Japanese are called kōbetsu (Imperial ancestry), shinbetsu (Divine ancestry), shoban (Foreign ancestry), and uncategorized:

=== Imperial ancestry ===
皇別 (kōbetsu): 335 families

- Scholars have noted that at least one family, the Yoshida clan (吉田氏), is listed under kōbetsu but was likely of foreign origin. According to Japanese historian Yoko Sugasawa (菅澤 庸子), the Yoshida family falsely claimed kōbetsu after claiming that Shiodaretsuhiko (塩垂津彦命), the son of Emperor Kōshō (who they claim descent) migrated to Kaya and became royalty and that their clan founder, Kitta no Yoroshi (吉田連) was a returning Japanese noble who had royal ties in both lands. In actuality, the Yoshida family was most likely only of Korean descent (specifically Paekche) and thus embraced the story of Emperor Kōshō's son of becoming royalty in Kaya to create legitimacy for having both ties with the imperial line and Korea. The general consensus is that the Yoshida family nor Kitta no Yoroshi was related to Shiodaretsuhiko or the imperial line.

=== Divine ancestry ===
神別 (shinbetsu): 404 families; of which 246 were of direct heavenly descent claiming to be born of gods who came down to Japan with Ninigi-no-Mikoto, 128 were of heavenly cadet descent, and 30 of 地祇 (chigi, earthly divine) as from gods who already existed in Japan before Ninigi descended.

=== Foreign ancestry ===
諸蕃 (shoban): 326 families; of which, 163 were of 漢 (Kan; かん), 104 of 百済 (Kudara; くだら), 41 of 高句麗 (Kōkuri; こうくり), 9 of 新羅 (Shiragi; しらぎ), and 9 of 任那 (Mimana; みまな) origin. They mainly claim descent from ancient Toraijins who came to Japan from the mainland during the Jōmon period to the Asuka period. Historically, shoban also meant "barbarian".

- "漢 (Kan)" is written as the Han dynasty of ancient China. However, as the character is read as both "から; Kara" or "あや; Aya" which means "the continent (China)", it most likely meant "of Chinese descent", not specifically alluding to the Han dynasty but rather China in general.
  - Some shoban families under "漢" are believed to be classified wrongfully according to modern research. Famous families such as the Hata clan were originally classified under "漢" but were later revised by modern historians. See controversy surrounding the book.

Notable families under 漢 (Kan/かん)
Classification	Yuzuki no Kimi (Hata)	Achi no Omi (Yamato no Aya)	Wani (Kawachinofumi (西文))	Tarisusu (太利須須)	Shamonei (沙門詠)	Mantoku no Omi (Ōtomo)	Hachita no Kusushi (蜂田薬師)	Others	Total
Number of associated clans	31	30	7	4	3	2	2	84	163
Claim	Originates from Paekche. Claims descent of Qin Shi Huang.	Originates from Paekche. Claims descent of Emperor Ling of Han.	Originates from Paekche. Claims descent of Emperor Gaozu of Han.	Originates from Paekche. Claims origin of Wu state.	Originates from Paekche. Claims descent of unspecified Chinese emperor.	Originates from Koma. (Note: "高麗/Koma", an alternate pronunciation and spelling of "高句麗/Kōkuri" meaning Goguryeo.) Claims descent of Emperor Gaozu of Han.	Originates from Paekche. Claims descent of Sun Quan.	Claims descent of notable figures such as: Cao Cao, Cao Pi, Emperor Yang of Sui, Gongsun Yuan, etc.	
Note	Name of the founder/clan. Includes all branch clans. Suspected of aggrandization thus revised as Silla descent.	Name of the founder/clan. Includes all branch clans. Suspected of aggrandization thus revised as Kaya descent.	Name of the founder/clan. Includes all branch clans. Suspected of aggrandization thus revised as Paekche descent.	Name of the founder. (Note: Most like related to Tarisusu (多利須須) under "百済 (Kudara)" who also came from Baekje that has the same pronunciation and almost exact spelling.) Includes all branch clans. Suspected of aggrandization thus revised as Paekche descent.	Name of the founder. Includes all branch clans. Suspected of aggrandization thus revised as Paekche descent.	Name of the founder/clan. Includes all branch clans. Revised as Silla descent.	Name of the founder. Includes all branch clans. Suspected of aggrandization thus authenticity of claim is questioned.	Some are suspected of aggrandization thus authenticity of claim is questioned.	

- "百済 (Kudara)" is the Japanese pronunciation for Paekche of ancient Korea. Due to the strong affinity between the two kingdoms, it is recorded as the largest origin for families of Korean descent.
  - Like with "漢", there are certain claims that are questioned by modern historians such as the origins of Yuzuki no Kimi, Achi no Omi, and Wani of whether or not Kudara/Paekche was indeed their country of origin and whether they truly existed. See controversy surrounding the book.

Notable families under 百済 (Kudara/くだら)
Classification	Ukyo	Sakyo	Kawachi	Settsu	Izumi	Yamashiro	Yamato	Total
Number of associated clans	46	14	15	9	8	6	6	104
Claim	Originates from Paekche. Claims descent of notable figures such as: Uija, Tokusa-Ō, Geungusu, Biyu, etc of Paekche.	Originates from Paekche. Claims descent of notable figures such as: Muryeong, Hye, Munju, etc of Paekche.	Originates from Paekche. Claims descent of notable figures such as: Jinsa, Jeonji, Dongseong, Buyeo Gonji, etc of Paekche.	Originates from Paekche. Claims descent of less notable figures of Paekche.	Originates from Paekche. Claims descent of notable figures such as: Ju, and less notable figures of Paekche.	Originates from Paekche. Claims descent of notable figures such as: Biryu, etc of Paekche.	Originates from Paekche. Claims descent of notable figures such as: Muryeong, etc of Paekche.	
Note	"Ukyo" means "the right side of the capital (Heian)" now known as Kyoto.	"Sakyo" means "the left side of the capital (Heian)" now known as Kyoto.	"Kawachi" means Kawachi Province in Osaka.	Name of an ancient province.	Name of an ancient province.	Name of an ancient province.	Name of the Yamato Kingship.	

- "高句麗 (Kōkuri)" is the Japanese pronunciation for Goguryeo of ancient Korea.

Notable families under 高句麗 (Kōkuri/こうくり)
Classification	Sakyo	Ukyo	Yamashiro	Yamato	Settsu	Kawachi	Total
Number of associated clans	15	9	5	6	3	3	41
Claim	Originates from Goguryeo. Claims descent of notable figures such as: Anryu, Yeonjeon, etc of Goguryeo.	Originates from Goguryeo. Claims descent of notable figures such as: Dongmyeong, Gwanggaeto, etc of Goguryeo.	Originates from Goguryeo. Claims descent of notable figures such as: Kusagi, Buryeon, etc of Goguryeo.	Originates from Goguryeo. Claims descent of less notable figures of Goguryeo.	Originates from Goguryeo. Claims descent of less notable figures of Goguryeo.	Originates from Goguryeo. Claims descent of less notable figures of Goguryeo.	
Note	"Sakyo" means "the left side of the capital (Heian)" now known as Kyoto.	"Ukyo" means "the right side of the capital (Heian)" now known as Kyoto. Some are suspected of aggrandization thus authenticity of claim is questioned.	Name of an ancient province.	Name of the Yamato Kingship.	Name of an ancient province.	"Kawachi" means Kawachi Province in Osaka.	

- "新羅 (Shiragi)" is the Japanese pronunciation for Silla of ancient Korea.
  - Similar to other immigrant clans, families under "Shiragi/Silla" origin are also questioned due to Amenohiboko having a legendary status. See controversy surrounding the book.

Notable families under 新羅 (Shiragi/しらぎ)
Classification	Ukyo	Sakyo	Yamashiro	Yamato	Settsu	Kawachi	Izumi	Total
Number of associated clans	3	1	1	1	1	1	1	9
Claim	Originates from Silla. Claims descent of notable figures such as: Amenohiboko, etc of Silla.	Originates from Silla. Claims descent of Amenohiboko of Silla.	Originates from Silla. Claims descent of less notable figures of Silla.	Originates from Silla. Claims descent of Amenohiboko of Silla.	Originates from Silla. Claims descent of Amenohiboko of Silla.	Originates from Silla. Claims descent of less notable figures of Silla.	Originates from Silla. Claims descent of less notable figures of Silla.	
Note	"Ukyo" means "the right side of the capital (Heian)" now known as Kyoto. Some are suspected of aggrandization thus authenticity of claim is questioned.	"Sakyo" means "the left side of the capital (Heian)" now known as Kyoto. It is suspected of aggrandization thus authenticity of claim is questioned.	Name of an ancient province.	Name of the Yamato Kingship. It is suspected of aggrandization thus authenticity of claim is questioned.	Name of an ancient province. It is suspected of aggrandization thus authenticity of claim is questioned.	"Kawachi" means Kawachi Province in Osaka.	Name of an ancient province.	

- "任那 (Mimana)" is the Japanese pronunciation for Kaya confederacy of ancient Korea.

Notable families under 任那 (Mimana/みまな)
Classification	Sakyo	Settsu	Yamato	Yamashiro	Total
Number of associated clans	3	3	2	1	9
Claim	Originates from Kaya. Claims descent of notable figures such as: Gasil, etc of Kaya.	Originates from Kaya. Claims descent of notable figures such as: Punggwi, etc of Kaya.	Originates from Kaya. Claims descent of Irigumo and Jwari of Kaya.	Originates from Kaya. Claims descent of Irigumo of Kaya.	
Note	"Sakyo" means "the left side of the capital (Heian)" now known as Kyoto.	Name of an ancient province.	Name of the Yamato Kingship. Some are suspected of aggrandization thus authenticity of claim is questioned.	Name of an ancient province. It is suspected of aggrandization thus authenticity of claim is questioned.	

- A total of 117 are listed as unclassified (未定雜姓).
  - Some families under "未定雜姓" have specific names that may allude to foreign origin. These include names such as 百済 (Kudara; くだら) for Paekche in Kudara clan (百済氏), "加羅 (Kara/から)" for Kaya in Kara clan (加羅氏), "韓 (Kara; から)" for Korea (in general) in Karanoamabenoobito clan (韓海部首), Wiman for the Fude clan (筆氏), Oh (surname) in Go clan (呉氏), etc. However, they are still considered "unclassified".

== Controversy surrounding the book ==
=== Historical inaccuracy ===
Due to the inconsistencies found within the records, modern historians are cautious as to deeming the Shinsen Shōjiroku as a reliable source at face value, especially in regards to the foreign "shoban" families and several imperial "kōbetsu" families.

The biggest criticism stems from the lack of evidence and that much of the sources found in the book are mostly baseless claims. Places like the city of Kyoto and Fushimi Inari-taisha, when revising the origins of the Hata clan, specifically stated their sentiments in regards to the Shinsen Shōjiroku as "unreliable" (Note: 『以上の来歴は、実際にはあまりあてにならず』 "The historical accounts are not very reliable" — Fushimi Inari-taisha) with having to rely on more reliable historical sources and archaeological evidence to draw up an accurate conclusion.

It is also worth noting that many of the claims found in the shoban allude to famous figures of great importance, such as influential emperors of China and kings and nobles of Korea. Though not all baseless, many families (like the aforementioned Hata clan) have conflicting origin stories that contradict one another without providing substantial evidence. Yuzuki no Kimi, for example, is considered as the founder of the Hata clan who was first mentioned in the Nihon Shoki as a refugee from the kingdom of Paekche. It was only when Shinsen Shōjiroku was published centuries later where the claim of Yuzuki no Kimi of being a descendant of Emperor Qin of the Qin dynasty was added. As mentioned above, the current consensus for the origin of the Hata clan is believed to be Silla and neither of the aforementioned places. Similar phenomena happen with notable shoban families such as Yamato no Aya clan under Achi no Omi, clans such as the Kawachinofumi clan under Wani, etc, all individuals who appear with different origin stories than those found in the Shinsen Shōjiroku. (Note: However, none of the individuals mentioned appear in Korean or Chinese records.)

		Yuzuki no Kimi	Achi no Omi	Wani
Source	Year	Claim	Claim	Claim
Kojiki	712	-	It states that he was sent to Japan from Paekche and suggested/introduced Wani to the Yamato kingship as a fellow mentor.	It states that he was sent to Japan from Paekche by the order of Emperor Ōjin to send any wise men as tribute from Geunchogo of Baekje.
Nihon Shoki	720	It states that he immigrated to Japan from Paekche with 120 clan members from an unspecified family.	It states that he immigrated to Japan from Paekche with his son Tsuka no Omi and their people from seventeen districts, and founded the Yamato no Aya clan.	It states that he was recommended by a fellow Paekche individual and immigrant, Achiki (Achi no Omi) where Emperor Ōjin sent two individuals to escort said individual from Paekche. It also states that he is the founder of the Fuminoobito clan and Kawachinofumi clan.
Shinsen Shōjiroku	815	Adds the claim that he is a descendant of Emperor Qin.	Adds the claim that he is a descendant of Emperor Ling of Han. (Note: In another instance, it is said that he is a descendant of Emperor Xian of Han. This claim is made through the Sakanoue clan, a cadet branch clan of the Yamato no Aya clan. Both clan names are present within the book while claiming descent from different emperors despite being related, thus making the nature of their claims questionable.)	Adds the claim that he is a descendant of Emperor Gaozu of Han. (Note: This parrots a claim found in the Shoku Nihongi (797).)

Interestingly, the general consensus in Japan is that many of the supposed founders were fictional due to the lack of mentioning in their respective kingdoms of origin, most likely created to help provide agency and legitimacy for immigrant clans to remain in their positions which was later exacerbated with the creation of the Shinsen Shōjiroku to aggrandize the already fictional claims made prior to the book's completion. Hence, positing possibilities of certain families of not truly being Chinese or Korean descent, only claiming to be related to their royalty for political and social influence.

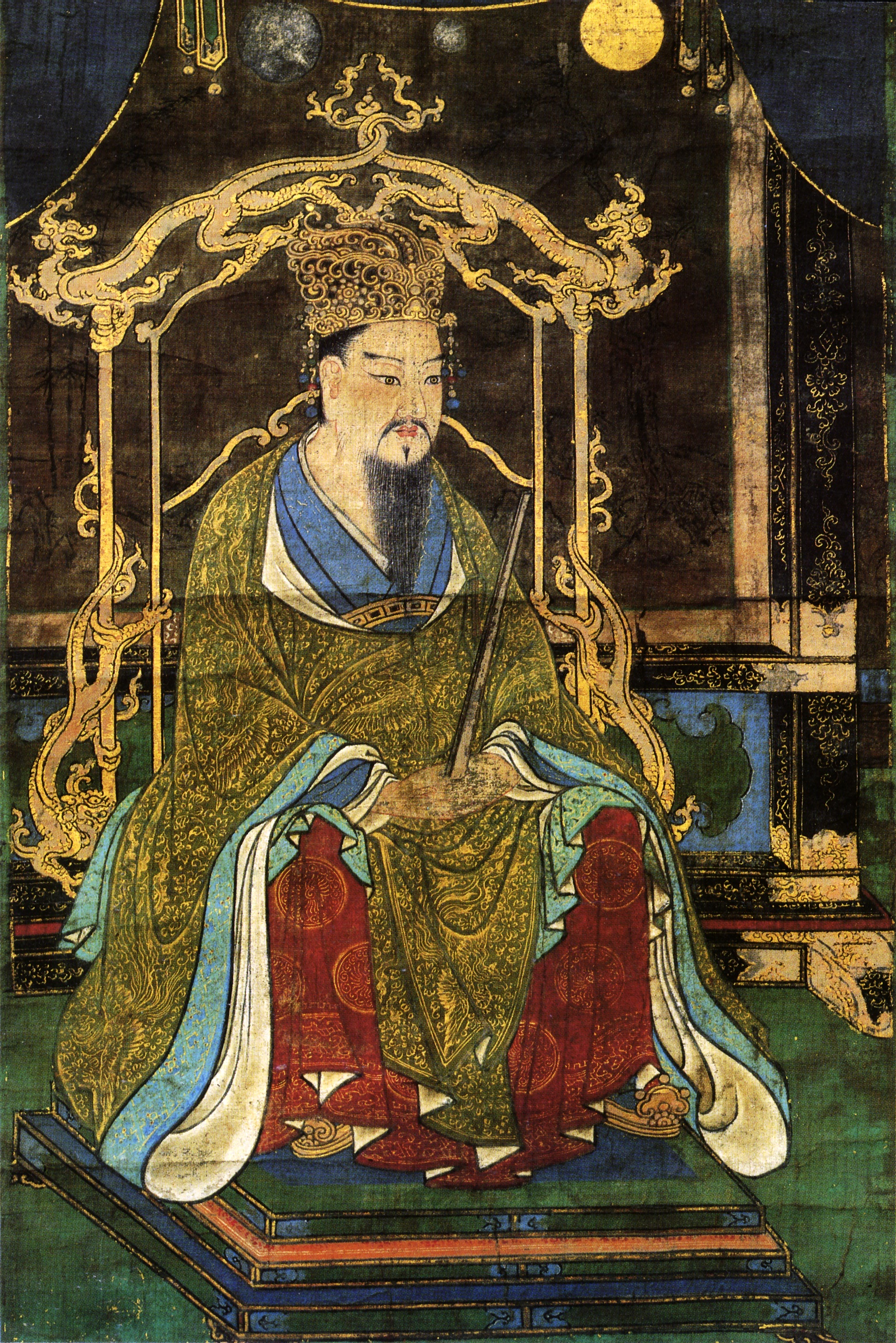
Emperor Kanmu, the first emperor to have commissioned a genealogical record in Japanese history.

It is believed that when Emperor Kanmu first ordered a genealogical record of the families in 799, his intention was to properly track the clans' then ambiguous lineages. This notion is evident as Kanmu was the emperor known for bestowing honorary names (such as the Taira clan) for his relatives in order to prevent an overcrowding of the imperial line. This was carried over to his children such as Emperor Saga with the Minamoto clan. It may also have been due to Kanmu's own lineage of being of Paekche descent (through Yamato no Fuhito clan) where he became personally invested in family lines in general. With the emperor's intention of officially recording down families of different origins, it is believed that many members ennobled their ancestors in order to distinguish themselves from other clans of foreign origins. Therefore, openly embracing their newly appointed identities regardless of their historical accuracy. In fact, according to historian Hiroshi Kurita (栗田 寛), it was common for Korean descendants to rely on prominent families for their lineage in order to raise their social status. (Note: 『社会的地位を引き上げるために、往々にして朝鮮系が名族に世系を仮託することはよくみられる現象である。』 "It is a common phenomenon for people of Korean descent to rely on noble families for their lineage in order to raise their social status." — 栗田 寛)

=== Frequent embellishment ===
Similar to shoban clans claiming descent from famous figures throughout the history of East Asia, other native Japanese clans also participated in embellishing their heritage to become closer to the divine shinbetsu family or the imperial kōbetsu family. After declaring the standards of each category through the publication of the book in 815, many future samurai clans who were from lesser important clans begun to claim descent from those who were of the shinbetsu line (such as the Fujiwara clan) or the kōbetsu line (such as the Taira clan, the Minamoto "Genji" clan and the Tachibana clan).

Famous cases include:

- The Oda clan claiming descent from the Taira clan (when it most likely came from the Inbe clan).
- The Sō clan claiming descent from the Taira clan (when it most likely came from the Koremune clan).
- The Tokugawa clan claiming descent from the Kawachi Genji (when it most likely came from the Matsudaira clan).
- The Sanada clan claiming descent from Seiwa Genji (when it most likely came from the Shigeno clan).
- The Shimazu clan claiming descent from Seiwa Genji (when it most likely came from the Koremune clan).
- The Toyoda clan claiming descent from the Fujiwara clan (disputed).
- The Saitō clan claiming descent from the Fujiwara clan (disputed).
- The Ii clan claiming descent from the Fujiwara clan (disputed).
- The Asakura clan claiming descent from the Kusakabe clan (disputed).
- The Chōsokabe clan claiming descent from the Hata clan (disputed).
- etc

It is believed that by doing this, they were able to elevate their positions within their ranks similar to the shoban families.

=== Ownership of foreign lineages ===
The book also presents claims that encompass not only the Japanese lineage, but heritage found outside of Japan as well. According to the book, Inahi no Mikoto, the brother of Emperor Jimmu who was the first emperor of Japan, was the ancestor to the kings of Korea, specifically to that of Silla. This narrative was carried over by other similar claims made by separate but related Japanese sources such as the Kojiki, Nihon Shoki, and Shoku Nihongi, and was utilized by Meiji era Japanese historians and anthropologists to create the Nissen dōsoron.

Similar to the criticisms above, these claims are also scrutinized by modern historians.

== See also ==
- Imperial House of Japan: The dynasty that claims descent of Amaterasu that majority of the kōbetsu families under Shinsen Shōjiroku claim origin of.
  - Japanese clans#Imperial clan: List of Imperial clans of Japan.
- Tenson kōrin: The descent of Amaterasu's grandson Ninigi-no-Mikoto from Heaven, and the event which includes many gods that majority of the shinbetsu families under Shinsen Shōjiroku claim origin of.
- Toraijin: Immigrants that arrived in Japan predominantly from the southern Korean peninsula that majority of the shoban families under Shinsen Shōjiroku claim origin of.
  - Japanese clans#Immigrant clans: List of Toraijin clans of different origins.
  - Nissen dōsoron: A Meiji era theory that revolves around Japan and Korea's demographics' genealogy impacted by ancient Toraijins that cites Shinsen Shōjiroku as a major source.

== Bibliography ==
- Kubota, Jun (2007). Iwanami Nihon Koten Bungaku Jiten [Iwanami Dictionary of Japanese Classical Literature] (in Japanese). Tokyo: Iwanami Shoten. ISBN 978-4-00-080310-6. OCLC 122941872.
- Nihon Koten Bungaku Daijiten: Kan'yakuban [A Comprehensive Dictionary of Classical Japanese Literature: Concise Edition]. Tōkyō: Iwanami Shoten. 1986. ISBN 4-00-080067-1. OCLC 22820487.
- Murayama, Izuru 1983 (23rd ed. 2005) Ōtomo no Tabito, Yamanoue no Okura: Yūshū to Kunō. Tokyo : Shintensha.
