= Ōtomo clan (immigrant) =

Ancient Japanese clan

Ōtomo 大友
- Home province: Silla (most likely); Goguryeo (according to the Shoku Nihongi; disputed); Paekche (according to the Nihon Shoki; disputed); Han dynasty (according to the Shinsen Shōjiroku; disputed)
- Parent house: Yamato no Aya clan (disputed); Sakanoue clan (disputed)
- Titles: Imiki; Sukune
- Founder: Mantoku no Omi (according to the Shoku Nihongi); Achi no Omi (according to the Nihon Shoki); Emperor Gaozu of Han (according to the Shinsen Shōjiroku); Emperor Ling of Han (according to the Shinsen Shōjiroku); Emperor Xian of Han (according to the Shinsen Shōjiroku)
- Cadet branches: Shiga clan (志賀氏)

Ōtomo clan (大友氏, Ōtomo-shi), was an immigrant clan from Korea that was active in Japan since the Kofun period.

== Origins ==
The clan is one of the many Toraijin clans that immigrated to Japan from Korea during the Kofun period.

Ancient sources provide conflicting origins ranging from chronologically confusing to contradictory claims.

Regardless, many have suggested different kingdoms throughout history starting from Goguryeo, Paekche, Han dynasty to Silla.

=== Traditional accounts ===
==== Goguryeo ====
According to the Shoku Nihongi (797), the Ōtomo clan descend from Mantoku no Omi, an immigrant from the kingdom of Goguryeo (written under "Koma; 高麗", an alternate pronunciation and spelling of "Kōkuri; 高句麗" meaning Goguryeo) through his descendant Ōtomo no Kuhaharanofuhito (大友桑原史).

==== Han dynasty ====
Later, the Shinsen Shōjiroku (815) added the claim that Mantoku no Omi was in fact the descendant of Emperor Gaozu of Han.

==== Paekche ====
A separate Japanese clan of foreign origin known as the Sakanoue clan claimed that the Ōtomo clan descended from Achi no Omi, founder of the Yamato no Aya clan (another immigrant clan from Korea and parent clan of the aforementioned Sakanoue clan), who is said to have come from the kingdom of Paekche according to the Nihon Shoki (720). The claim made by the Sakanoue clan is found in the family's genealogy.

However, it is said the Achi no Omi was a descendant of Emperor Ling of Han following the claim made by the Yamato no Aya clan in the Shinsen Shōjiroku, while a claim made by the Sakanoue clan asserts that Achi no Omi was a descendant of Emperor Xian of Han. These claims are found simultaneously with the previous claim made by the Ōtomo clan itself in regards to Mantoku no Omi being a descendant of Emperor Gaozu of Han within the Shinsen Shōjiroku.

==== Silla ====
Despite not being mentioned by any traditional accounts, modern historians speculate that the Ōtomo clan originated from the kingdom of Silla.

=== Modern analysis and accounts ===
In recent years, the claims made in ancient accounts are deemed unreliable and implausible by modern Japanese historians, which makes the Ōtomo clan and its origin stories difficult to accept at face value.

On the other hand, through the discovery of historical evidence as well as religious evidence, historians point to Silla as the true kingdom of origin for the clan.

==== Historical inaccuracy ====
The earliest record of Ōtomo clan and its founder, Mantoku no Omi, is believed to be a self-proclamation made by immigrants who moved to Japan from Korea. (Note: 『万徳使主の名は、今のところ『新撰姓氏録』以上のことは分からない。この段で言う「桑原邑」は葛上郡の桑原郷であろう。渡来した一族が、その祖は高句麗の万徳使主であったと自称し、やがて各地に広がったと思われる。』 "At present, we know nothing more about the name of Mantoku no Omi other than what is found in the Shinsen Shojiroku. The "Kuwabara Village" mentioned in this section is likely Kuwabara-go in Katsuragi County. It is believed that the family that migrated there claimed to be Mantoku no Omi of Goguryeo as their ancestor, and eventually spread to various places." — 上代語で読む日本書紀)

Similar practice can be found again during the Heian period while compiling the Shinsen Shōjiroku where the descendants added the claim of Mantoku no Omi, an already self-proclaimed founder, being a descendant of Emperor Gaozu of Han. These aggrandization and embellishment of certain clans and their supposed ancestors were common during the Heian period and are heavily criticized by modern Japanese historians today (see controversy surrounding the Shinsen Shōjiroku).

This problem was further exacerbated by the Sakanoue clan claiming that the Ōtomo clan was originally from Achi no Omi, who was recorded as an individual from Paekche originally, but was added later to be a descendant of Emperor Ling of Han in the Shinsen Shōjiroku. On top of that, it is said that the Yamato no Aya clan claimed Emperor Xian of Han as Achi no Omi's ancestor in said Shinsen Shōjiroku, making five distinct claims (Goguryeo=Mantoku no Omi; Gaozu of Han=Mantoku no Omi; Paekche=Achi no Omi; Ling of Han=Achi no Omi; Xian of Han=Achi no Omi) as possible origins for the Ōtomo clan. In essence, the conflicting arguments make their legitimacy questionable for modern historians. (Note: All of these claims are made from Japanese sources. There are no Korean or Chinese records mentioning any names of said individuals despite their alleged places of origins.)

In fact, the Ōtomo clan shares much similarities with a fellow clan of speculated Silla origins, the Hata clan. The Hata, a family said to have originally come from Paekche, also self-proclaimed their founder as Yuzuki no Kimi, an individual who at first had no ties with the Hata clan. It was only when they added the claim during the compilation of the Shinsen Shōjiroku this was first mentioned, while also claiming that Yuzuki no Kim was a descendant of Emperor Qin of China. However in actuality, recent studies have shown that the clan was originally from Silla, (Note: 『以上の来歴は、実際にはあまりあてにならず、近年では、秦氏は朝鮮半島の新羅地方出身であろうと考えられています。』 "The historical accounts are not very reliable, therefore in recent years, the Hata clan is believed to have come from Silla of Korea." — Fushimi Inari-taisha 『古代に朝鮮半島から渡来した氏族。《日本書紀》応神天皇条に，秦始皇帝(しんのしこうてい)子孫という伝承をもつ弓月君（ゆづきのきみ）が多数の民を率いて渡来したのに始まるとしますが，「はた」は古代朝鮮語で海の意であり，実際は5世紀中頃に新羅から渡来した氏族集団と考えられます。』 "[The Hata clan is] a clan that migrated from the Korean Peninsula in ancient times. The section on Emperor Ōjin in the Nihon Shoki states that the clan began when Yuzuki no Kimi, who is said to be a descendant of Emperor Qin Shi Huang, led a large group of people to Japan. However, "hata" means "ocean" in ancient Korean, and it is believed that the clan actually migrated from Silla in the mid-5th century." — History of the City: Hata clan, City of Kyoto) and therefore, it is likely that the Ōtomo clan is probably the same.

==== Connections to Shinra Myōjin and other kamis ====
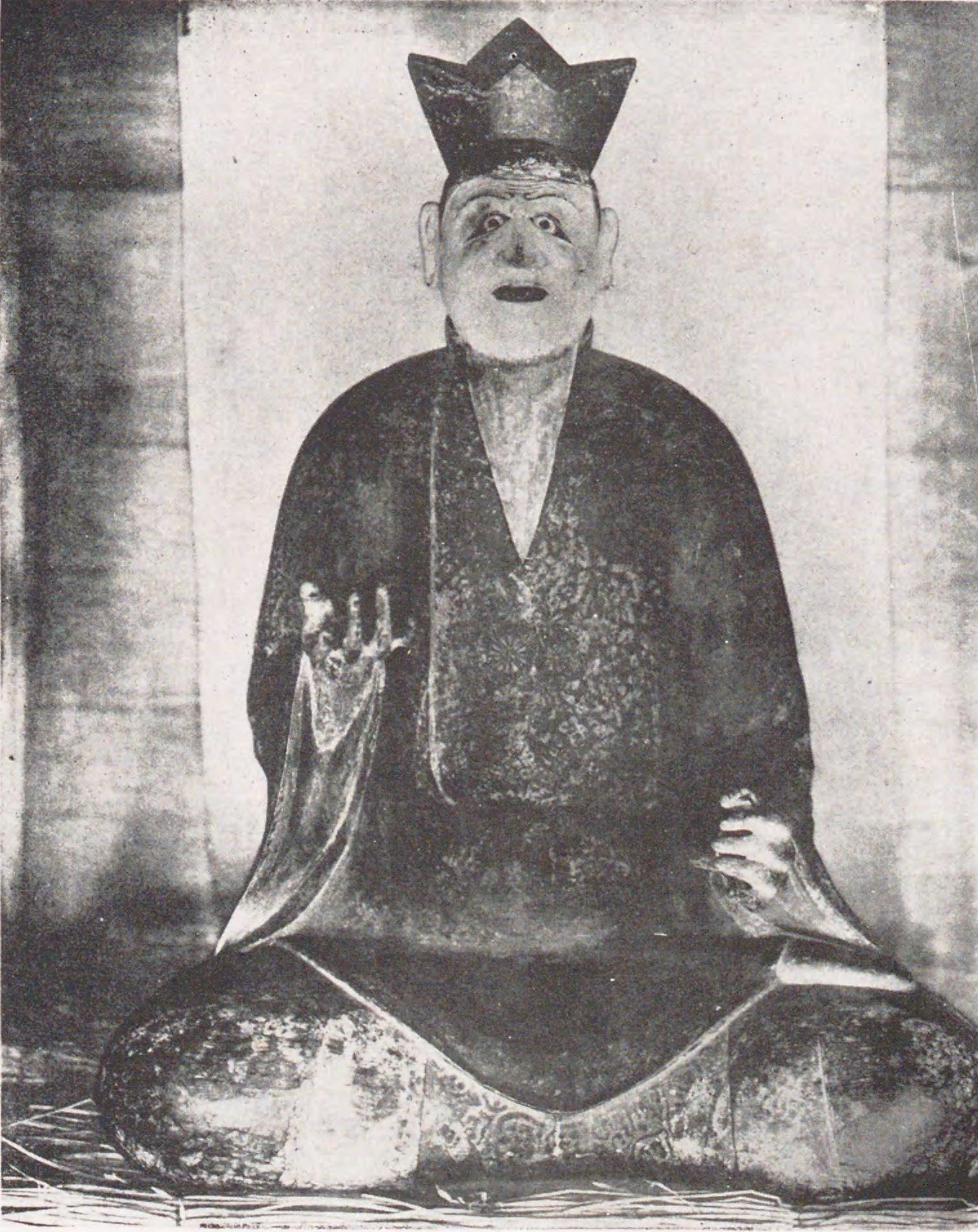
A statue of Shinra Myōjin, the kami from Silla. Found in Mii-dera, Shiga Prefecture.

It is said that the history of the Ōtomo clan was heavily intertwined with Shinra Myōjin (lit. 'Shining deity of Silla'), a Buddhist god associated with the Jimon branch of Tendai, a school of Japanese Buddhism. His name is derived from the name of a historical Korean kingdom, Silla.

Professor Sujung Kim (김수정) at DePauw University of religious studies who specializes in history of Buddhism in East Asia, claims that the Ōtomo clan's special ties to deities such as the Shinra Myōjin may provide an insight to the clan's possible origins.

It is said that the Ōtomo clan was one of the earliest clans to commemorate Shinra Myōjin and was involved in promoting the veneration of said deity. Kim posited that the Shinra Myōjin originally being a Silla god sheds light on the possibility of the clan being Silla immigrants as it was common for immigrants from specific regions to be left with commemorating gods from the same origins as seen with the Hata clan and the kami Inari.

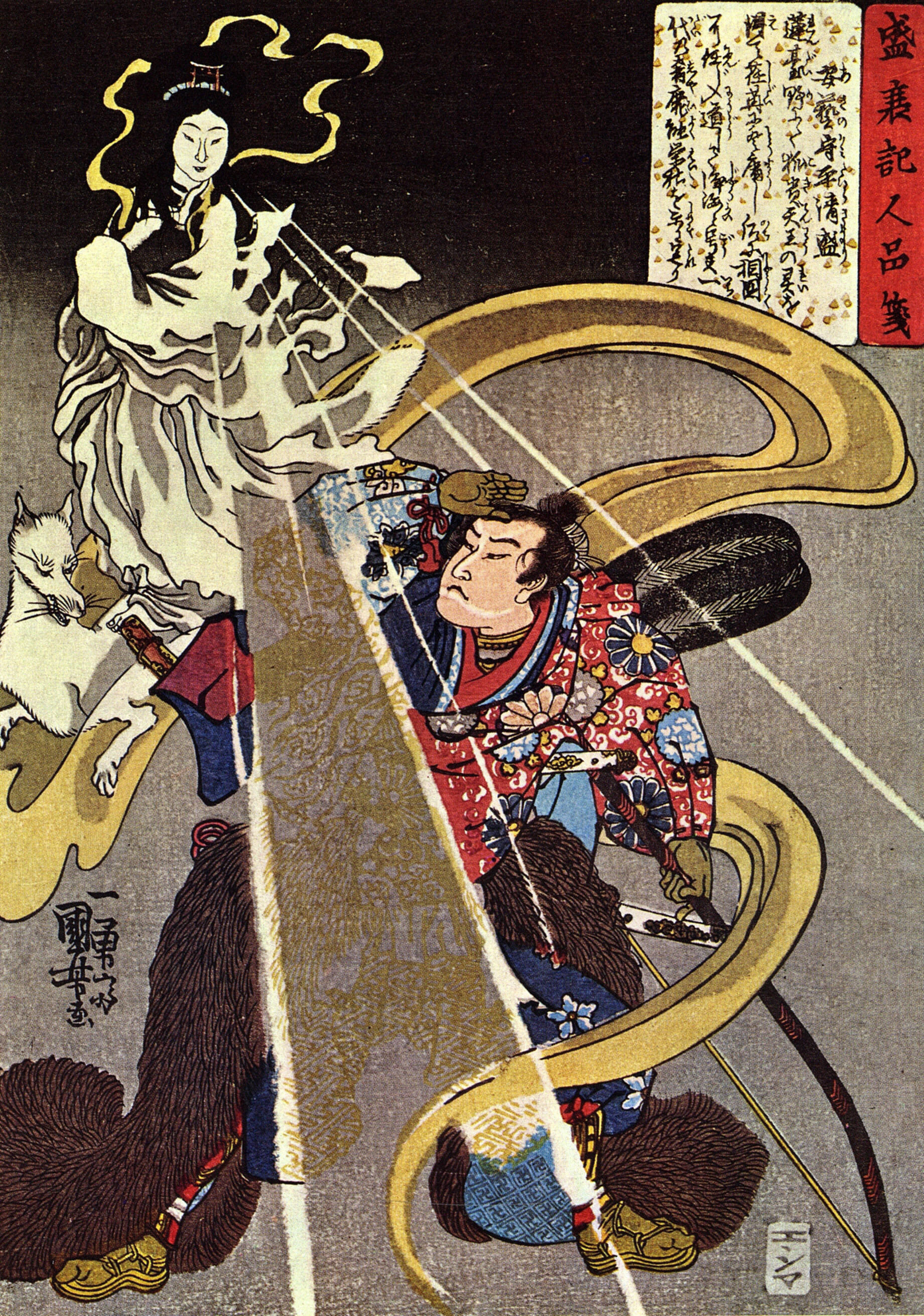
Kami Inari appearing in front of a warrior.

Fushimi Inari-taisha, the same shrine built by the Hata clan and one of the most influential shrines to officially celebrate the god Inari, stated that the fox deity was most likely not of Japanese origin and had most likely arrived in Japan from the kingdoms of the Korean peninsula. It states that during the Three Kingdoms of Korea period, foxes were widely celebrated as gods and were deified as protectors of agriculture and prosperity due to the influence of Buddhism. Scholars such as Kazuo Higo (肥後 和男) suggest that the Hata clan began the formal worship of Inari as an agriculture kami in the late 5th century as the name "Inari" does not appear in classical Japanese mythology which most likely indicates that the god is foreign.

This concept of an agricultural deity was later carried over to the Japanese archipelago by other immigrant clans which arrived in Japan in the earlier centuries and was given the name "稲荷 (いなり)" in kanji which means "carrying rice", (literally "rice load") first found in the Ruijū Kokushi in 892 AD.

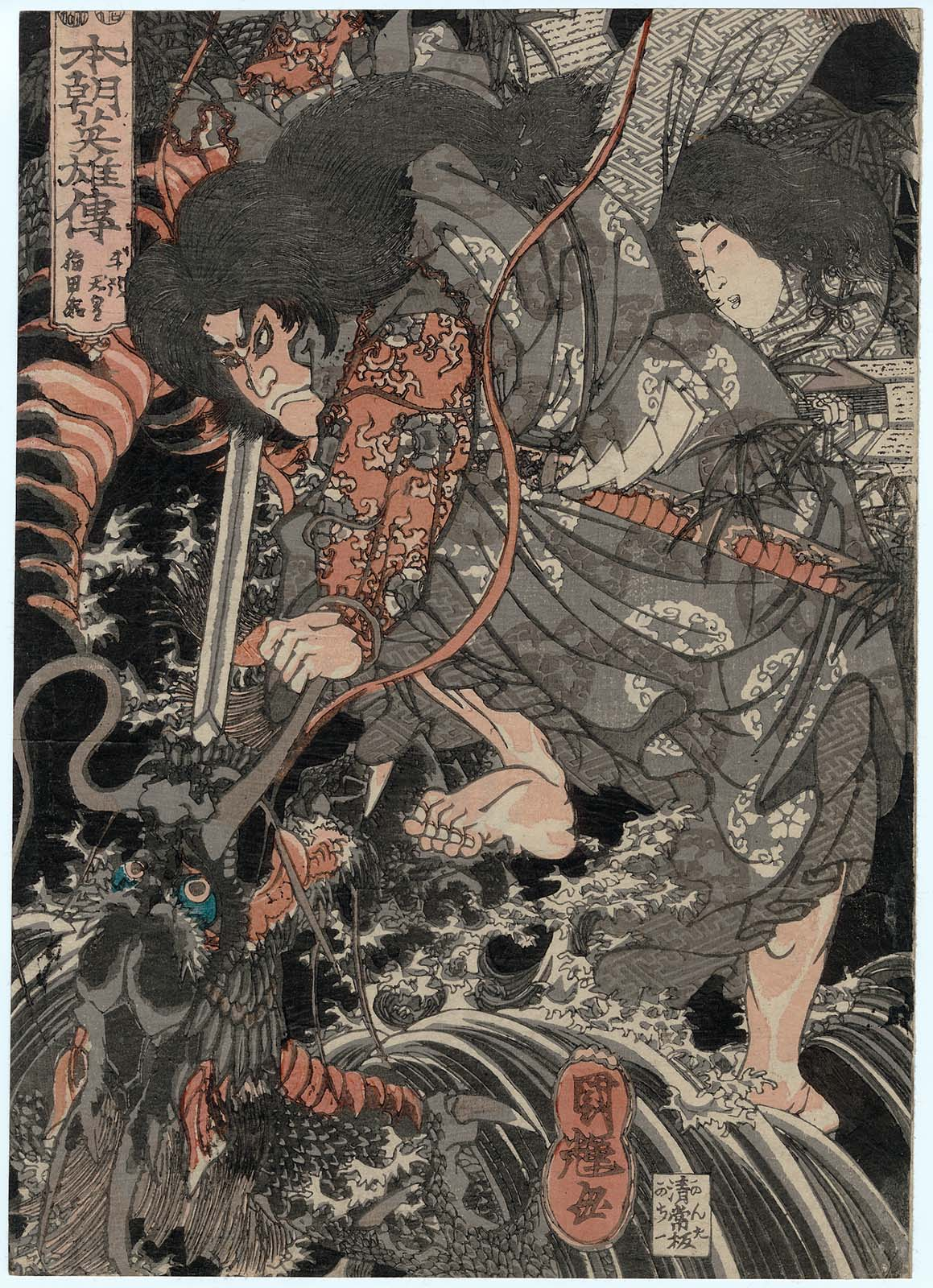
Susanoo kills the Yamata no Orochi. (Utagawa Kuniteru)

Other kamis such as Susanoo-no-Mikoto, and in turn, Gozu Tennō are also often speculated to have foreign origins as well, specifically to that of Silla. Their amalgamation and heavy Silla influence in regards to their origin stories posit the aforementioned theory about Korean gods being introduced to Japan by immigrants.

The theories surrounding Shinra Myōjin being introduced to Japan as a foreign god coincide with other kamis such as Inari, Susanoo, and Gozu Tennō, which may have been introduced in a similar fashion. Their Silla roots (Shinra Myōjin–Ōtomo; Inari–Hata; Susanoo/Gozu Tennō–Soshimori/Silla) may indicate that the kamis were originally from the peninsula until they were brought over to Japan by Korean immigrants.

== Legacy ==
The clan is most well-known for its member Ōtomo no Kuronushi, a famous poet who was part of the Rokkasen.

Many of their descendants today commemorate Shinra Myōjin and his temple, Mii-dera.

== See also ==
- Japanese clans#Immigrant clans: List of Toraijin clans of different origins.
  - Hata clan
  - Yamato no Aya clan
  - Tatara clan
  - Toyoda clan
