= 東漢 =

東漢 or 东汉 is an East Asian character for a word or morpheme that means Eastern Plains.

It may refer to:

- Eastern Han, a period of Han dynasty
- Yamato no Aya clan, an immigrant clan
