= Tatara clan (Japan) =

Ancient Japanese clan

Tatara 多々良
- Home province: Kaya confederacy
- Parent house: Kaya royalty; Prince Imseong? (disputed); Gimhae Kim clan? (disputed)
- Founder: Irigumo of Kaya?
- Founding year: 6th century
- Dissolution: Unknown (likely succeeded or absorbed by cadet branch clans)
- Cadet branches: Ōuchi clan; Yamaguchi clan (Chūgoku); Yamaguchi clan (Owari); etc

The Tatara clan (Japanese: 多々良氏, Hepburn: Tatara-shi) was an immigrant clan from Korea that was active in Japan since the Kofun period that claimed descent from King Irigumo of the Kaya confederacy according to the Shinsen Shōjiroku (815).

== Origin ==
The clan is one of the many Toraijin clans that immigrated to Japan from Korea during the Kofun period.

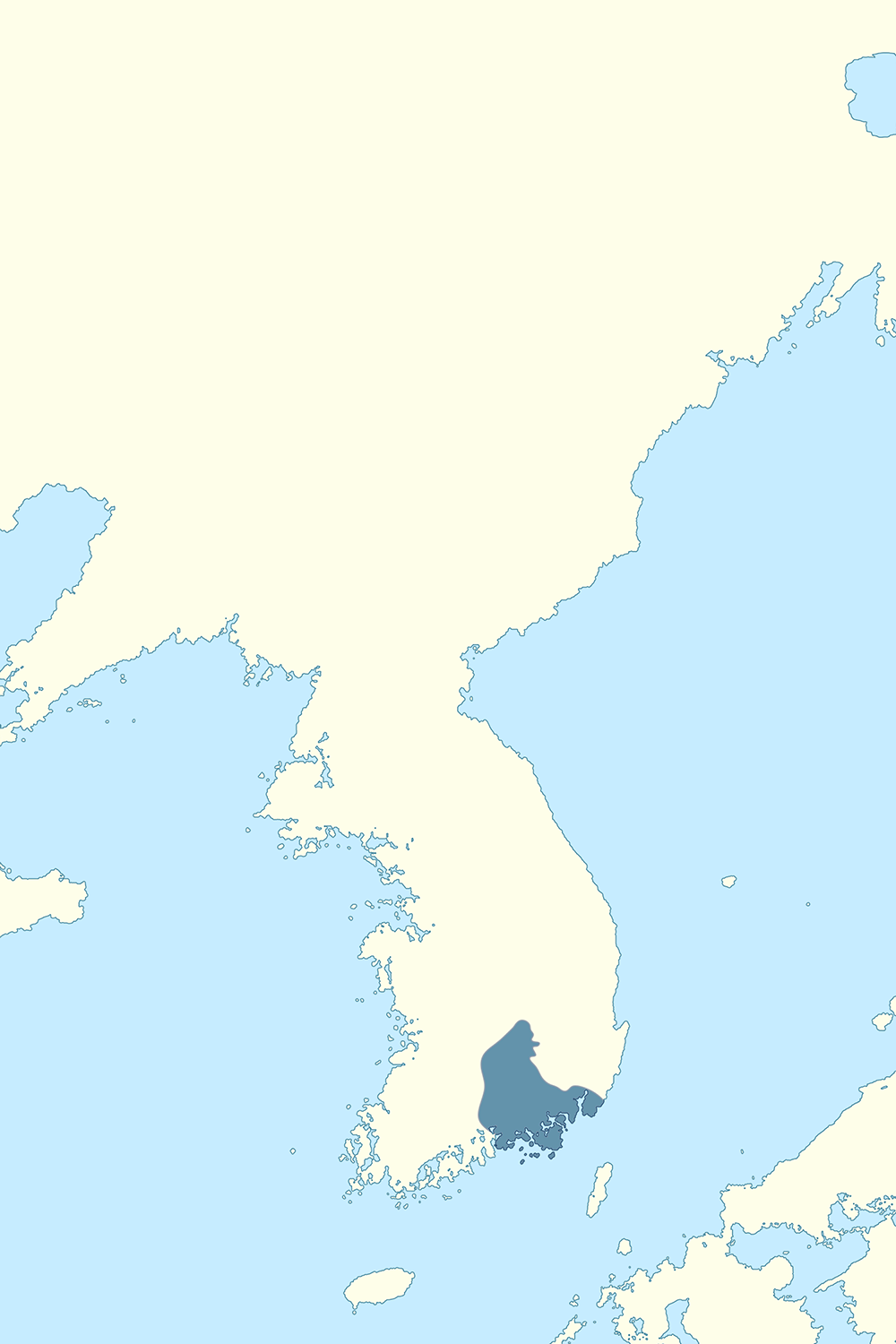
Kaya confederacy in the 6th century. The home kingdom of King Irigumo and the Tatara clan.

According to the Shinsen Shōjiroku, it is said that the Tatara clan claimed descent from King Irigumo of the "Mimana kingdom (御間名国主)". The kingdom, although written in different characters, was an alternate spelling of the Kaya confederacy which is commonly known as Mimana (任那) in Japan.

Japanese: 天國排開広庭天皇[謚欽明。]御世。投化。献金多々利金乎居等。天皇誉之。賜多々良公姓也。

— Shinsen Shōjiroku, Japanese: 出自御間名国主尓利久牟王也

According to historical records, the clan presented tributes to Emperor Kinmei such as the "Kintatari (金多多利)" and "Kinkakyo (金乎居)" upon naturalizing, however, the true meaning behind these tributes is unknown and is speculated to be ritualistic weapons such as the Seven-Branched Sword or the Inariyama Sword, due to the names containing the "metal (金)" character. The confederacy was also known for its metal (iron) productions.

In other instance, the names could represent people as Kaya was known to be the birthplace of the Kaya "Kim" of Korea which uses the same metal character; the Gimhae Kim clan (金海 金氏) being the most populous surname with more than six million present day Koreans claiming descent from the family. However, due to Kaya being a confederacy of smaller kingdoms, it is unknown whether King Irigumo was from Geumgwan Gaya (home province of the Gimhae Kim clan) or another state, as information surrounding the king is scarce and heavily limited. (Note: His name only appears in the Shinsen Shōjiroku and in no other sources. The name is not found in Korea or Japan, outside the book.) The nature of the Shinsen Shōjiroku, being a historically unreliable book also creates skepticism in regards to the existence of Irigumo as his original kingdom is neither mentioned or specified. However, due to the reign of Emperor Kinmei overlapping with the fall of Kaya, it can be assumed that the clan was most likely refugees from the recently fallen confederacy.

Regardless, the tributes given by the clan satisfied the emperor where he bestowed the name "Tatara (多々良)" to the newly arrived immigrants.

== History ==
The Tatara clan became a local government official with jurisdiction in the Suō Province.

- In the year 1152 August 1st: the Suō Province office decree dated August 1st, states that three of the nine office bearers who signed the decree were Tatara.
- In the year 1178 October 5th: Tatara Moriyasu (多々良盛保), Tatara Morifusa (多々良盛房), Tatara Hiromori (多々良弘盛), and Tatara Tadato (多々良忠遠) were spared from exile.
- In the year 1182 April 28th: Among the ten local government officials who co-signed the petition for the Nodera monk Benkei, the highest ranking person appears to be Gonsuke Tara (Morobusa).
- In the year 1187 February: Local government officials jointly signed a petition to the Imperial Court alleging that vassals in Suō Province had obstructed the transport of timber for the construction of Todaiji Temple, and the name of Tatara no Sukune Hiromori appears among the 13 local government officials who jointly signed this letter of dismissal. On the other hand, in 1191, Hiromori himself was sued by Chogen in Kamakura for obstructing the transport of pillars for the construction of Todaiji Temple, but the shogunate dismissed the petition, stating that Ōuchi no Suke (Hiromori) was "not a person under the jurisdiction of the Kanto region," and recommended that he report to the Imperial Court. This series of contradictory actions is said to have been due to the fact that the Ōuchi clan needed cooperative relationships with kokushi and deputies in order to use the provincial government organization as a foothold to organize the various local powerful families under their control.
- In the year 1250: Ōuchi no Suke Tatara Hirosada was assigned the responsibility for the construction of the Kan'in Imperial Palace in Kyoto, which was overseen by the shogunate. Also, when a dispute arose between the lord of Yoda no Yasu and Komon the following year, Rokuhara instructed Ōuchi no Suke to handle the matter. Therefore, it is believed that the Tatara clan (Ōuchi clan) at this time was essentially akin to a shugo (military constable).

== Legacy ==
The powerful Ōuchi clan is famous for claiming descent from the Tatara clan, despite also claiming that Prince Imseong of Paekche was their clan founder. However, modern historians have long questioned this claim and speculate that it is most likely only of Kaya (Tatara) descent and not the prince's evident in the clan members claiming descent from the Tatara clan in the Shinsen Shōjiroku and the Sue clan (a lateral branch clan of the Ōuchi) adopting the character from a pottery style that is famous for its Kaya roots. The clan is also heavily related to the Toyoda/Toyota clan, known for the famous car manufacturer, the Toyota Group. According to the official Toyota Family Genealogy (豊田家系譜; とよたけいふ; Toyotakeifu), the clan descends from Prince Imseong who in turn was a descendant of King Dongmyeong of Goguryeo. According to this narrative, it makes the Toyota clan a relative family to the Tatara clan, as well as its cadet branch, the Ōuchi clan.

In recent times, at the north of the current provincial government office in Hōfu City, Yamaguchi Prefecture, there is a place called "Tatara (same spelling)" and a mountain called "Mount Tatara (多々良山)", which are thought to be the remains of the Tatara clan.

== See also ==
- Japanese clans § Immigrant clans: List of Toraijin clans of different origins.
  - Hata clan
  - Yamato no Aya clan
  - Ōtomo clan
- Ōuchi clan
- Toyoda clan
