= Wani (scholar) =

Semi-legendary East Asian scholar

- 王仁
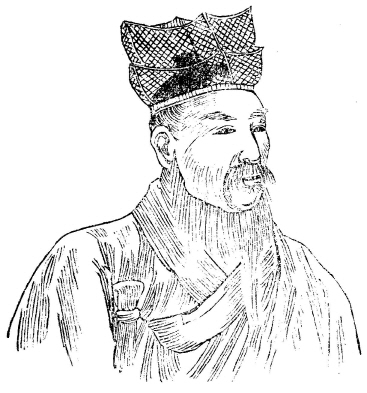
- A depiction of Wani in 1908, Korea
- Other names: Wani (和邇; わに)
- Occupations: Scholar; Philosopher; Expatriate; Clan leader
- Title: Kishi (吉師; きし)

Academic work
- Discipline: Confucianism

Wani (王仁) originally known as Wanikishi (和邇吉師), was a semi-legendary scholar who is said to have been sent to Japan by Paekche of southwestern Korea during the reign of Emperor Ōjin. He used to be associated with the introduction of the Chinese writing system to Japan.

He is considered one of the three most influential Toraijins alongside Yuzuki no Kimi and Achi no Omi during the Kofun period.

== Original sources and analysis ==
Wani is mentioned only in Japanese history books; he is not recorded in Korean or Chinese sources. The main sources of Wani's biography are the Kojiki (712) and the Nihon Shoki (720).

"[...] and, [the Emperor Ōjin] ordered [Geunchogo, the King of] Paekche, "If there is any wise man, offer him up as tribute." The person whose name, offered by the command, was Wani-kishi (和邇吉師). And, [the King] gave, as tributes, along with him, ten volumes of the Analects and one volume of the Thousand Character Classic. This Wani-Kishi is the progenitor of the Fumi-no-Obito clan."

— Kojiki, middle volume (Note: Original text: 又，科賜百濟國，若有賢人者，貢上。故受命以貢上人名，和邇吉師。即論語十卷・千字文一卷，并十一卷，付是人即貢進。此和邇吉師者，文首等祖。)

In the 15th year [of the Emperor Ōjin's reign] (AD 284), in autumn, in August, new moon of rén-xū, dīng-mǎo (the sixth), the King of Paekche dispatched Achiki (Achi no Omi) and offered up two good horses as a tribute [to Japan, along with him]. Then, they were reared in the stable (umaya) atop the hill (saka) of Karu. And, Achiki was entrusted to raise them. Therefore, the place where the horses were raised was called Umayasaka. Achiki also read the Confucian classics well. Then, Prince Uji-no-Waki-Iratsuko took him as his teacher. Now, the Emperor inquired to Achiki, saying, "Is there any scholar superior to you?" He replied, "There is a man called Wani. He is excellent." Then, the Emperor dispatched Aratawake and Kamunagiwake (a male oracle), who were ancestors of the Kamitsuke-no-Kimi clan, to Paekche, to summon Wani. This Achiki is the progenitor of the Achiki-no-Fubito clan. In the 16th year, in spring, in February, Wani had come. Then, Prince Uji-no-Waki-Iratsuko took him as his teacher, learned various classics under him and there was nothing he didn't become thoroughly acquainted with. This so-called Wani was the progenitor of the Fumi-no-Obito clan.

— Nihon Shoki, Vol. 10 (Note: Original text: 十五年秋八月壬戌朔丁卯，百濟王遣阿直岐，貢良馬二匹。即養於輕阪上廄、因以阿直岐令掌飼。故號其養馬之處曰廄阪也。阿直岐亦能讀經典。及太子菟道稚郎子師焉。於是天皇問阿直岐曰，如勝汝博士亦有耶。對曰，有王仁者。是秀也。時遣上毛野君祖荒田別・巫別於百濟，仍徵王仁也。其阿直岐者阿直岐史之始祖也。十六年春二月、王仁來之。則太子菟道稚郎子師之，習諸典籍於王仁莫不通達。所謂王仁者，是書首等始祖也。)

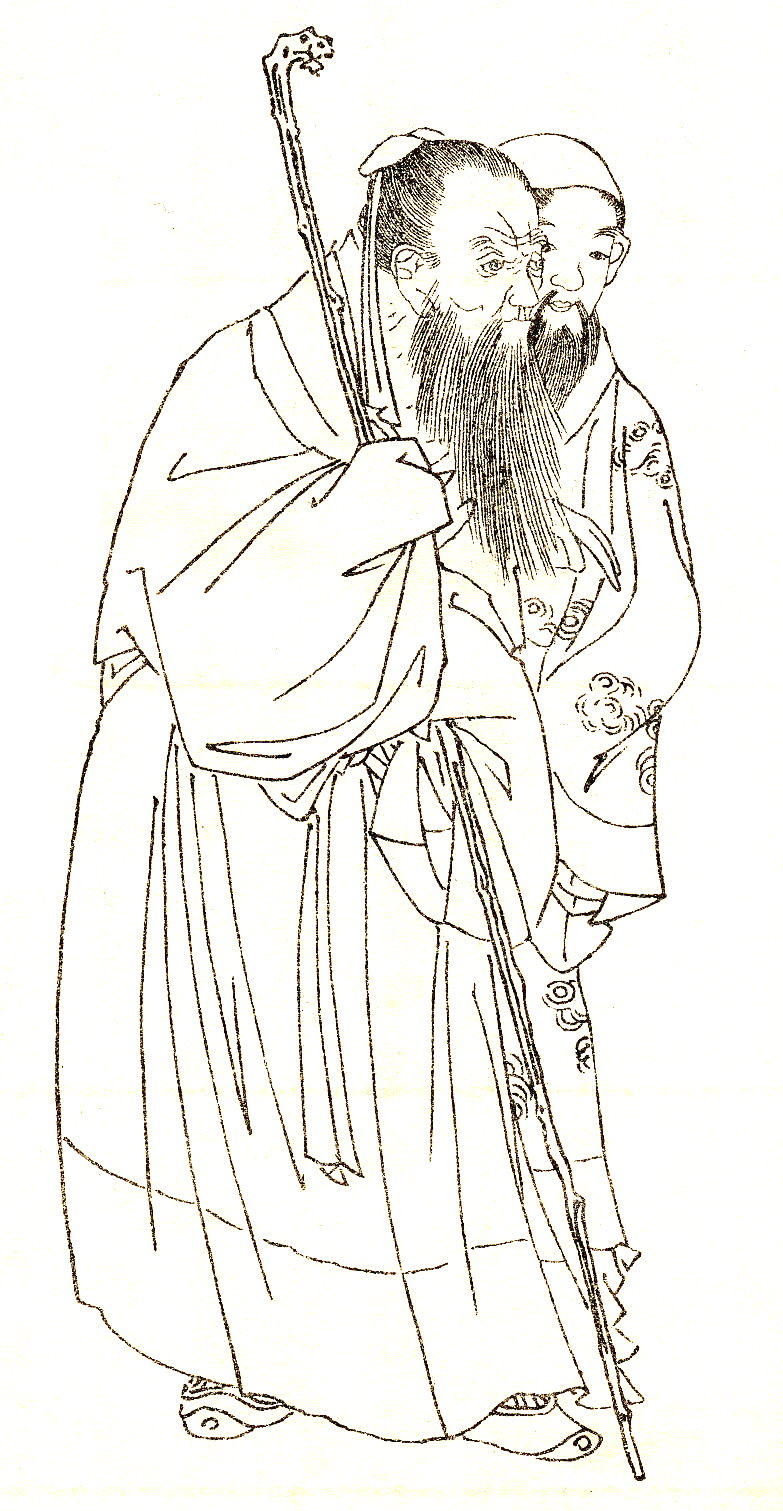
Wani as imagined in 19th-century Japanese drawing

These stories have long been questioned by scholars. Ten volumes are too much for the Analects, and more importantly, his alleged arrival predates the composition of the Thousand Character Classic (the early 6th century). Arai Hakuseki (1657–1725) considered that Wani had brought a certain book of Elementary Learning which the Kojiki had confused with the Thousand Character Classic. Motoori Norinaga (1730–1801) claimed that it was pointless to care about details because the Thousand Character Classic was mentioned just as a typical book of Elementary Learning. Some assume a different version of the Thousand Character Classic was brought but this theory has no clear basis. In short, it is not unnatural for people like Wani to have come to Japan around that time, but there is no strong evidence determining whether Wani really existed.

Dating the alleged arrival of Wani is rather difficult since there are long-lasting disputes over the accuracy of these sources on early events. According to the traditional dating, it would be 285 though is considered too early by historians. Based on the reign of King Akue (阿花王; identified as King Asin 阿莘王) of Paekche, who, according to the Nihon Shoki, died in the 16th year of Emperor Ōjin's reign, it would be 405. However, this theory contradicts the description of the Kojiki, which says that Wani's arrival was during the reign of King Shōko (照古王; usually identified as King Geunchogo 近肖古王, r. 346-375) of Paekche. The Kojiki suggests that Wani arrived sometime after 372.

== Origin ==
Due to the peculiar nature of the records, the origins of Wani is often questioned, bringing up several theories in regards to his identity.

The most popular and widely accepted theory is that Wani (alongside many other clan founders) was a by product of a political move in Japan that provided clans of foreign origins their founders with legendary qualities in return for political stability and cooperation. Much like Yuzuki no Kimi and Achi no Omi, who also lack records of respective kingdoms they allegedly hail from (Silla and Paekche), Wani's origins are also considered more symbolic than historically accurate in recent times.

Another less popularized theory is that Wani was a Chinese individual who naturalized to Paekche after the fall of the Four Commanderies of Han. According to this theory, Wani's surname was "王 (Ō)", a character that is widely used by Chinese individuals, which thus alludes to a Chinese origin. In 791 Wani's descendants including Fumi no Mooto (文最弟) and Takefu no Makata (武生真象) made a successful attempt to elevate their kabane or family rank. According to the Shoku Nihongi (797), their appeal was as follows:

Luan (鸞) was a descendant of Emperor Gaozu of Han. Luan's descendant Wang Gou (王狗) moved to Paekche. During the reign of King Kuso of Paekche, the imperial court sent envoys to summon literati. King Kuso offered Gou's grandson Wang Ren (Wani) as a tribute. He was the founder of Fumi, Takefu and other clans. (Note: The article of the wuxu day, the 4th month, Enryaku 10 (791), from the Shoku Nihongi: 漢高帝之後曰鸞, 鸞之後王狗転至百済. 百済久素王時, 聖朝遣使徴召文人. 久素王即以狗孫王仁貢焉. 是文, 武生等之祖也.)

However, modern Japanese scholars have criticized the claim that he was the descendant of a famous Chinese emperor as the character only makes its first appearance in Nihon Shoki and an entirely separate character "和 (Wa)" is used to represent his name in the much older, Kojiki. Skeptics argue that the two characters were merely there for phonetic reasons (Kun'yomi) as the correct pronunciation of "王仁" in On'yomi is in fact, "Ō Jin" or "Ō Nin" not "Wani". To elaborate, Wanikishi, the original name Wani was first recorded under includes a suffix, "-kishi (吉師)" that is thought be of Paekche origin as found in titles found in Paekche royalty recorded as "-gilji (吉支)", pronounced "-kichi" in Old Korean. For further context, the alternate name for fellow Paekche immigrant Achi no Omi, "Achikishi (阿知吉師)" was also recorded with the suffix "-kishi", indicating a commonality between said individuals. In addition, the original characters "和邇" is indeed pronounced "Wani" as seen in Wani (dragon) therefore, it can be deduced that his name was pronounced "Wani", regardless of the Chinese characters. Many stress the change from "和邇" to "王仁" was due to many Chinese Confucianists having the surname "王 (Wang in Chinese)" at the time and that his name was changed to fit more with the idea of him being a "Confucianist" rather than basing it on his ethnicity.

A similar story can be found in the description of the Fuminosukune (文宿禰) clan by the Shinsen Shōjiroku (815) which is thought to have been influenced by the aforementioned story. However, much like the other founders of influential clans of foreign origin, the claim that Wani was from a Chinese imperial line is considered a fabricated story made by their descendants to elevate their ranks as similar attempts are found within Yuzuki no Kimi and Achi no Omi's stories (both allegedly descendants of Emperor Qin and Emperor Ling of Han, respectively). Modern Japanese historians deduced that archeological, genealogical and historical evidence showed that the individuals were in fact of Korean origin (Note: 『古代に朝鮮半島から渡来した氏族。《日本書紀》応神天皇条に，秦始皇帝(しんのしこうてい)子孫という伝承をもつ弓月君（ゆづきのきみ）が多数の民を率いて渡来したのに始まるとしますが，「はた」は古代朝鮮語で海の意であり，実際は5世紀中頃に新羅から渡来した氏族集団と考えられます。』 "A clan that immigrated from the Korean peninsula in ancient times. In the Emperor Ōjin section of Nihon Shoki, it is said that Yuzuki no Kimi, who is said to have been a descendant of the First Qin Emperor, led a large group of people to Japan. However, "Hata" means "sea" in ancient Korean, and it is thought that the tribe actually came from Silla in the mid-5th century." — Kyoto City, History of the City 01 [Hata clan] 『以上の来歴は、実際にはあまりあてにならず、近年では、秦氏は朝鮮半島の新羅地方出身であろうと考えられています。』 "The historical accounts are not very reliable, and in recent years it has been thought that the Hata clan came from the Silla region of the Korean peninsula." — Fushimi Inari-taisha 『特別史跡のキトラ古墳、高松塚古墳をはじめ数多くの史跡が残る奈良県明日香村は、“列島の古代”がそっくり眠っている場所。この地に根を張ったのが、新羅系の秦氏と共に古代の職能集団を束ねた百済系の漢氏（東漢氏）でした。』 "Asuka Village in Nara Prefecture is home to many historic sites, including the Kitora tombs and Takamatsuzuka tombs, which are special historical sites, and is a place where the "ancient times of the archipelago" remains intact. The Yamato no Aya clan of Baekje, which together with the Hata clan of Silla, had roots in this area, led an ancient professional group." — 片岡伸行, 神々のルーツ 明日香の地と「今木神」) and that their stories (which were in truth added much later after their first mentions in older sources) created by their descendants were simply a means to an end for political dominance.

Source	Year	Claim
Kojiki	712	Written under "Wanikishi", it states that he was sent to Japan from Paekche by the order of Emperor Ōjin to send any wise men as tribute from Geunchogo of Baekje.
Nihon Shoki	720	Written under "Wani", it states that he was recommended by a fellow Paekche individual and immigrant, Achiki (Achi no Omi) where Emperor Ōjin sent two individuals to escort said individual from Paekche. It also states that he is the founder of the Fumi no Obito clan and Kawachi no Fumi clan.
Shoku Nihongi	797	Adds the claim that he is a descendant of Emperor Gaozu of Han.

According to Japanese historian Junichi Shida (志田諄一), Wani being "a Han dynasty-era Chinese individual that naturalized to become Korean in Paekche who then immigrated to Japan to become Japanese" is unlikely and that in the best case scenario, was just a Korean individual with the surname "Wang". (Note: However, Shida's theory does not mention the fact that the surname "Wang" in Korean, though having no relations with China's surname of the same character, first emerged during the Goryeo dynasty, long after Wani's supposed arrival in Japan.) However, Shida is also cautious in regards to this claim and is inclined to remain skeptical about Wani's existence.

=== Modern interpretations ===
The article of the Nihon Shoki was traditionally interpreted as the introduction of Confucianism and/or Chinese literature although not clearly stated in the history book.

According to the preface to the Kokin Wakashū (905), a famous Waka poem starting with "Naniwa-zu" was traditionally attributed to Wani. (Note: To be precise, this speculation was given as an old commentary to an obscure passage in the Kokin Wakashū. Other interpretations are also possible, and the poem referred to as "Naniwa-zu" in the statement in question might be a different one. An important candidate is the first tanka by Emperor Nintoku since it was created at the palace of Naniwa.) At that time, the imperial throne was vacant for three years because the future Emperor Nintoku (successor to Emperor Ōjin) and his brother Crown Prince Uji no Waki Iratsuko renounced succession to the throne to crown the other. Historians and philologists are skeptical about the attribution to Wani because it cannot be found in earlier sources. From the early 10th century on, this poem was regarded as a chorus that praises Emperor Nintoku. As a result, Wani was portrayed as a sage submitting to the emperor's virtue.

From the Heian period onward, references to Wani mostly involved the Naniwa-zu poem. Some commentaries to Waka poems describe Wani as a man from Silla in southeastern Korea. Although this error was corrected by Fujiwara no Norikane's Waka dōmōshō (1145–53) and Kenshō's Kokinshū jo chū (1183) with the reference to the Nihon Shoki, it survived for a long time. To solve the contradiction, Reizei Tamesuke even claimed in 1297 that Wani had been transferred from Paekche to Silla and then from Silla to Japan. A possible reason for this error is that Wani's arrival at Japan was interpreted as a result of Empress Jingū's conquest of Silla, which was recorded in the Nihon Shoki.

The general consensus is that Wani was an individual who was created to give political agency to Japanese clans of foreign origins at the time, which is why his existence is nowhere to be found outside of Japanese records. It is also the reason why he was recorded under multiple names across several sources (despite having the same pronunciation), many of them putting emphasis on the symbolism of his accomplishments.

Much like the other prominent immigrants such as Yuzuki no Kimi and Achi no Omi, modern historians consider Wani to be a fictional individual whose story was added later to help create origin stories for clans with foreign backgrounds.

== Influence ==
The descendants of Wani, or more precisely, those who claimed Wani to be their ancestor, were collectively called the Kawachi no Fumi clan and the Kawachi no Aya clan. They lived in Kisaichi of Kawachi Province together with their branch families. The head family had the uji "Fumi" [literature] after their duty as scribes, and similarly their branch families were given the kabane "Fuhito" [scribe].

Despite Wani's fame as a scholar, the Kawachi no Fumi clan was not so active as secretaries for administration. A rare exception was Fumi no Nemaro (文禰麻呂; ?–707). Instead of being active in civil administration, he rose to a rank unusually high for a mid-level bureaucrat for his military performances in the Jinshin War (672). Some historians consider that this was the reason why the legend of Wani was recorded in the Kojiki and the Nihon Shoki. It is known that scribes of foreign origin had similar and mutually conflicting legends about their founders. Features common in their stories include the arrival during the reign of Emperor Ōjin, the introduction of Chinese literature and/or Confucianism, and the surname Wang. The legend of Wani was chosen with the rest of them ignored because the Kawachi no Fumi clan was relatively powerful at the time of the compilation of the history books.

== Name ==
As mentioned above, Wani was originally recorded under "Wanikishi (和邇吉師/わにきし)" and was later given new characters of "王仁" later on.

The "-kishi (吉師)" suffix in Wanikishi is believed to be an allusion to the title "-gilji (吉支)", or "-kichi" in Old Korean, of Paekche when addressing their royalty, specifically to that of the king. In Paekche, the king was called "Geon'gilji (鞬吉支/건길지)" and it is believed that the title was given to Wanikishi when depicting him of Paekche descent (also seen in Achikishi).

In Korean, he is known as "Wang-in (왕인)" based on his "王仁" characters. However, following his original name of Wanikishi, he should be called "Hwa-i'gilsa (화이길사)" based on his "和邇吉師" characters.

== Contemporary misusage ==
=== Hirakata ===
An alleged tomb of Wani is said to be located in Hirakata, Osaka Prefecture. It is, however, most likely that the tomb identified in the 18th century has nothing to do with Wani.

The supposed "tomb" was located in Fujisaka Village, Kawachi Province (part of the modern-day Hirakata city). It was originally a pair of stones known to local people as "Oni Tomb" (於爾墓). In other words, they were not associated with Wani. The situation changed in 1731 when the Confucian scholar Namikawa Seisho (並河誠所) visited there for the purpose of compiling a geography monograph named Gokinaishi (五畿内志). He claimed that he discovered an old document at Wada Temple of Kin'ya Village (also part of the modern Hirakata) that read the name "Oni Tomb" was the corrupt form of Wani Tomb. At his recommendation, a stonetomb was built behind the stones. It is generally considered that the "tomb" in Hirakata is Namikawa's fabrication. There is no ancient record that refers to Wani's burial site. Archaeologically speaking, there was no such custom of setting a tombstone on a mound before the introduction of Buddhism.

The new myth spread as the Kokugaku movement became active. Wani was praised as a talented and faithful servant to the ancient emperors. In 1827, a monument in honor of Wani was erected near the tomb, on which his name was engraved by Prince Arisugawa. After the Meiji Restoration, a ceremony was held at the tomb in 1899 to commemorate the 1500-year anniversary of the death of Emperor Nintoku.

After the annexation of Korea, another symbolic role was given to Wani in relation to modern Korea/Koreans. As part of an effort to integrate Korea into the empire, conciliatory approaches were adopted. Wani was utilized as a historical precedent for serving the emperor loyally in spite of non-Japanese root. In 1927 a society was set up in Tokyo to build a shrine for Wani. Its member included Uchida Ryōhei from the Black Dragon Society. The project for building a shrine in the site of the Wani tomb began in 1930. In 1932 the society celebrated the 1650-year anniversary of Wani's arrival there. The construction of Wani shrine started in 1940 but was never completed. In addition to Wani Shrine, a pair of monuments was built in honor of Wani in Tokyo's Ueno Park in 1939.

With the disintegration of the Japanese Empire, the political role of Wani ceased to exist. Instead, Wani was targeted by Korean political exploitation. Koreans, in turn, use Wani as a symbol of ancient Korea's "cultural superiority" over Japan. Since the 1980s Korean nationals in Japan have led various events visualizing Wani's alleged arrival at Japan. President Kim Dae-jung sent a personal letter to a ceremony at the tomb in 1998, and Prime Minister Kim Jong-pil visited there in 1999.

=== Yeongam ===
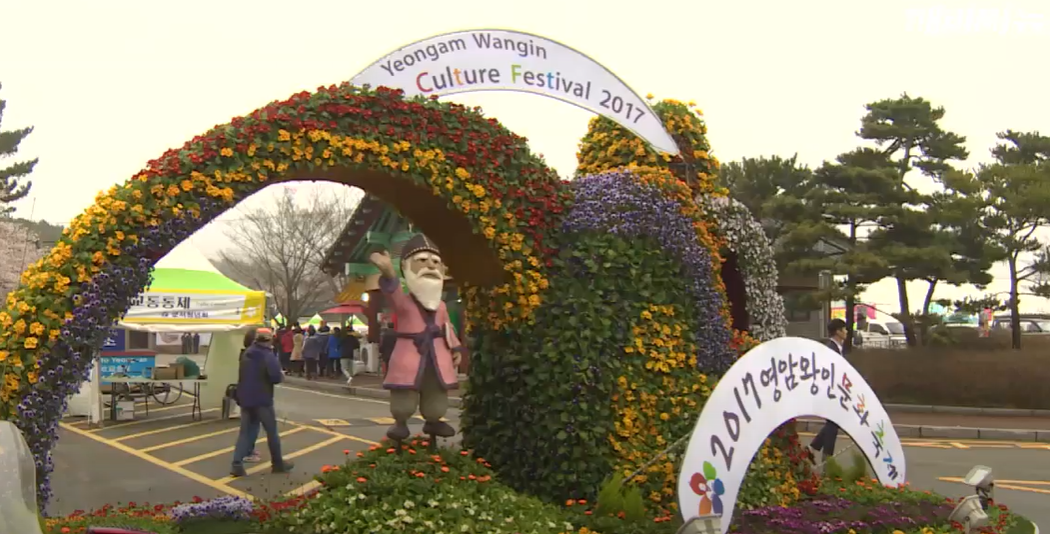
Entrance of 2017 Yeongam Wang-in culture festival.

Even though Korea has no historical records on Wani, "Doctor Wang In's Historical Sites" (Wang-in is the Koreanized form of Wani, 왕인) are located in Gurim Village, Yeongam County, South Jeolla Province, South Korea today. It is based on a new myth that can date back only to the early 20th century.

Earlier geography books including the Taekriji (1751) never link Wani to Yeongam. The first known record that associates Wani with Yeongam is the Joseon Hwanyeo Seungnam (朝鮮寰輿勝覧; 1922–37) by Yi Byeong-yeon (이병연, 李秉延). It claims without providing any evidence that Wani was born in Yeongnam. (Note: The Joseon Hwanyeo Seungnam makes mention of Wani's "tomb" in Hirakata.) It is known that around the same time, a Japanese monk named Aoki Keishō claimed on the basis of "oral tradition" that Yeongam was Wani's homeland. In 1932 he made a failed appeal to erect a bronze statue of Wani in Yeongam.

A new myth about Wang-in was publicized in South Korea in the 1970s. In 1972 the social activist Kim Changsu reported a series of essays titled "Korean spirit embodied in Japan". In the framework of Korean national history, Wani was regarded as a Korean. Upon being informed by a reader from Yeongam, Kim issued a statement identifying Yeongam as the birthplace of Wani in the next year. In spite of the weakness of the evidence, Wani's "relic site" was designated as Cultural Asset No. 20 of South Jeolla Province in 1976.

The development of Wani's "historical sites" was led by the governments of South Jeolla Province and Yeongam County. The governor of South Jeolla Province was from Yeongam County. The construction was carried out from 1985 to 1987, "restoring" the "birthplace", schools where Wani allegedly studied, and others. Yeongam County started to fully exploit the old-looking new theme park as a tourist attraction because the introduction of local autonomy of 1990 forced the local government to look for its own source of revenue. For example, Youngam County began to host the annual "Wang-in Culture Festival" in 1997 that was previously organized by local people under the name of "Cherry blossom festival". The exploitation was not done without opposition. In fact, it is criticized by a faction who attempts to use Buddhist monk Doseon (827–898) as the main tourism resource of Yeongam.

== See also ==
- Korean influence on Japanese culture
- Toraijin
  - Yuzuki no Kimi
  - Achi no Omi
