= Toyoda clan =

Ancient Japanese clan

Toyoda/Toyota 豊田
- Home province: Paekche
- Parent house: Paekche royalty (self-proclaimed; disputed); Fujiwara clan (self-proclaimed; disputed)
- Founder: Prince Imseong (self-proclaimed) Fujiwara no Michitaka (self-proclaimed)
- Founding year: 7th century

The Toyoda clan (豊田氏, Toyoda-shi) was an immigrant clan from Korea that was active in Japan since the Kofun period that claims descent from Prince Imseong of Paekche.

== Origin ==
The clan is one of the many Toraijin clans that immigrated to Japan from Korea during the Kofun period.

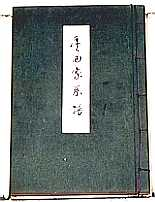
The Toyota Family Genealogy

『抑ゝ先祖ハ百済国ノ始祖都慕大王に始まり其第拾参代威徳王第三王子琳聖太子推古天皇之十九年本朝に移り来里同帝能思召に因りて山陽八箇國を賜はり子々孫々相嗣ぎ武を煉り勇を磨き傍ら殖産工業及び鉱業を奨め尚ほ海外貿易を司り其富強海内無雙と称えられ且は第四十弐代大内義弘に至りて南北両朝統一に盡して大功有り。 [...] 本書一子相傳不出門外不繙妄者此儀堅相守可申者也』

"Our ancestors begin with King Domo (Tomo), the founding ruler of the kingdom of Paekche. From his line, the third prince of King Wideok, the 13th sovereign, Prince Rinshō, came to Japan in the 19th year of Empress Suiko’s reign. By the gracious favor of that sovereign, he was granted the eight provinces of the San’yō region. Thereafter, his children and descendants succeeded one another generation after generation, cultivating martial skill and polishing valor, while also encouraging industry, production, and mining, and furthermore managing overseas trade, so that their wealth and power were said to be unmatched throughout the realm. Moreover, by the time of the 42nd-generation lord Ōuchi Yoshihiro, he rendered distinguished service in bringing about the unification of the Northern and Southern Courts. [...] This book is to be transmitted only from parent to child and must not leave the household. It must not be opened or shown carelessly to others. These rules are to be strictly observed."

— Toyota Family Genealogy

According to the clan's genealogy, the Toyota Family Genealogy (豊田家系譜; とよたけいふ; Toyotakeifu), the family claims descent from Prince Imseong who in turn was a descendant of King Dongmyeong of Goguryeo.

However, modern historians question the authenticity of the evidence alluding to the existence of Prince Imseong, positing that the prince was a fabricated individual who never truly existed, and someone many Japanese clans of foreign origin utilized to proclaim a clan founder. The general consensus is that even though the prince may be a fictional individual, most clans of self-proclaimed foreign origin have roots outside of Japan.

Later in history, the family also claimed to have been descended from Fujiwara no Michitaka of the Fujiwara clan during the Sengoku period. However, due to inconsistency surrounding the genealogy and historicity of the claim, it is regarded as an embellishment and an attempt to elevate their status.

== Names ==
While "Toyoda" is the most common way of reading the characters "豊田", it is also known under the pronunciation of "Toyota", though it is not frequently used and may create confusion for readers.

== Legacy ==
It is believed that the family is related to the Tatara clan, and in turn, the Ōuchi clan, due to the latter also claiming to have descended from Prince Imseong. For the same reason, it is speculated that the Toyoda clan's prevalence in the Yamaguchi Prefecture is because of its similar origin with the Yamaguchi clan of Chūgoku, a cadet branch of the aforementioned Ōuchi clan, and a prominent family that ruled over the area throughout its history.

The clan's descendants in modern days have elevated the clan's name into recognizable titles, such as the Toyota Group founded by Sakichi Toyoda of the Toyoda family.

Due to the influence of the Toyoda family, the city that the group is based in changed its name to "Toyota city (豊田市)" from the original "Kuromo city (挙母市)" on January 1, 1959.

== See also ==
- Japanese clans § Immigrant clans: List of Toraijin clans of different origins.
  - Hata clan
  - Yamato no Aya clan
  - Tatara clan
  - Ōtomo clan
- Ōuchi clan
