= List of Toraijin people =

Pre-modern immigrants to Japan

This page compiles notable figures under the Toraijin classification of lesser importance and lack of information. Many of them have conflicting background stories with Korea being the place of origin in their respective original texts, but being given royal heritage from Chinese emperors later in the Shinsen Shōjiroku. According to historian Hiroshi Kurita (栗田 寛), it was common for Korean descendants to rely on prominent families for their lineage in order to raise their social status. (Note: 『社会的地位を引き上げるために、往々にして朝鮮系が名族に世系を仮託することはよくみられる現象である。』 "It is a common phenomenon for people of Korean descent to rely on noble families for their lineage in order to raise their social status." — 栗田 寛)

Generally, like with most notable Toraijin figures, they are considered fictional regardless of their supposed place of origin or self-proclaimed lineage.

== Hachita no Kusushi ==
Hachita no Kusushi
- 蜂田薬師
- Pronunciation: はちたのくすし
- Born: Paekche
- Died: Japan
- Occupation: Clan leader

Hachita no Kusushi (蜂田薬師, hachita no kusushi) was an individual from Paekche, who is later said to be a descendant of Sun Quan according to the Shinsen Shōjiroku (815). But due to conflicting information from different sources, and the natures of said books, Hachita no Kusushi may be a fictional individual that was created by his descendants. Such sentiment is posited by historians such as Hirose Yoichi (廣瀬 陽一) who states that descendants that claimed heritage from Hachita no Kusushi is not genealogically accountable.

== Irigumo of Kaya ==
Irigumo
- 尓利久牟
- Pronunciation: いりぐも
- Born: Kaya confederacy
- Died: Japan
- Occupation: King
- Family: Tatara clan

Irigumo (尓利久牟, irigumo) was a king from the Kaya confederacy and the founder of the Tatara clan according to the Shinsen Shōjiroku (815).

天國排開広庭天皇[謚欽明。]御世。投化。献金多々利金乎居等。天皇誉之。賜多々良公姓也。

— Shinsen Shōjiroku, 出自御間名国主尓利久牟王也

According to the book, it is said that the king hailed from Kaya, however, due to Kaya being a confederacy, it is difficult to identify which kingdom Irigumo is from. (Note: His name only appears in the Shinsen Shōjiroku and in no other sources. The name is not found in Korea or Japan, outside the book.)

In addition, because the book is also criticized by modern historians for being unreliable to be viewed as a primary source, it is entirely possible that a king named "Irigumo" is fictional.

== Mantoku no Omi ==
Mantoku no Omi
- 万徳使主
- Pronunciation: まんとくのおみ
- Born: Goguryeo
- Died: Japan
- Occupation: Clan leader
- Family: Ōtomo clan

Mantoku no Omi (万徳使主, mantoku no omi) was an individual from Goguryeo (spelled "Koma/高麗") according to the Shoku Nihongi (797) and the founder of the Ōtomo clan. It was later added in the Shinsen Shōjiroku (815) that he was a descendant of Emperor Gaozu of Han, however, much like the other claims found in the books, these claims are scrutinized.

== Shamonei ==
Shamonei
- 沙門詠
- Pronunciation: しゃもんえい
- Born: Paekche
- Died: Japan
- Occupation: Clan leader

Shamonei (沙門詠, shamonei) was an individual from Paekche according to the Shoku Nihongi (797) and the grandfather to Takaoka no Hiramaro (高丘宿禰比良麻呂/高丘比良麻呂). His origin is changed in the Shinsen Shōjiroku (815) to have come from China, however, this may be an aggrandization by his descendants.

There is a theory positing that Shamonei was a member of the Sa clan or the Sataek clan (沙宅氏/사택씨), famous for Sataku Jyōmyō (沙宅紹明), of Paekche.

== Tarisusu ==
Tarisusu
- 多利須須
- Pronunciation: たりすす
- Born: Paekche
- Died: Japan
- Other names: 太利須須
- Occupation: Clan leader

Tarisusu (多利須須/太利須須, tarisusu) was an individual from Paekche according to the Shinsen Shōjiroku (815).

His name is written twice under different characters each classified under different categories. His first and original name, "多利須須" contains a footnote that he was from Paekche. However, an alternate spelling under "太利須須" with only a single character difference is classified under "Kan (漢)" which meant mainland China. It is said that he has roots in the Wu state.

There is a possibility that the two names are from different individuals, but the likelihood is low and is most likely the result of his descendants claiming different origins of their founder by putting a minor distinction in his name.
