= Aya clan =

Japanese immigrant clans

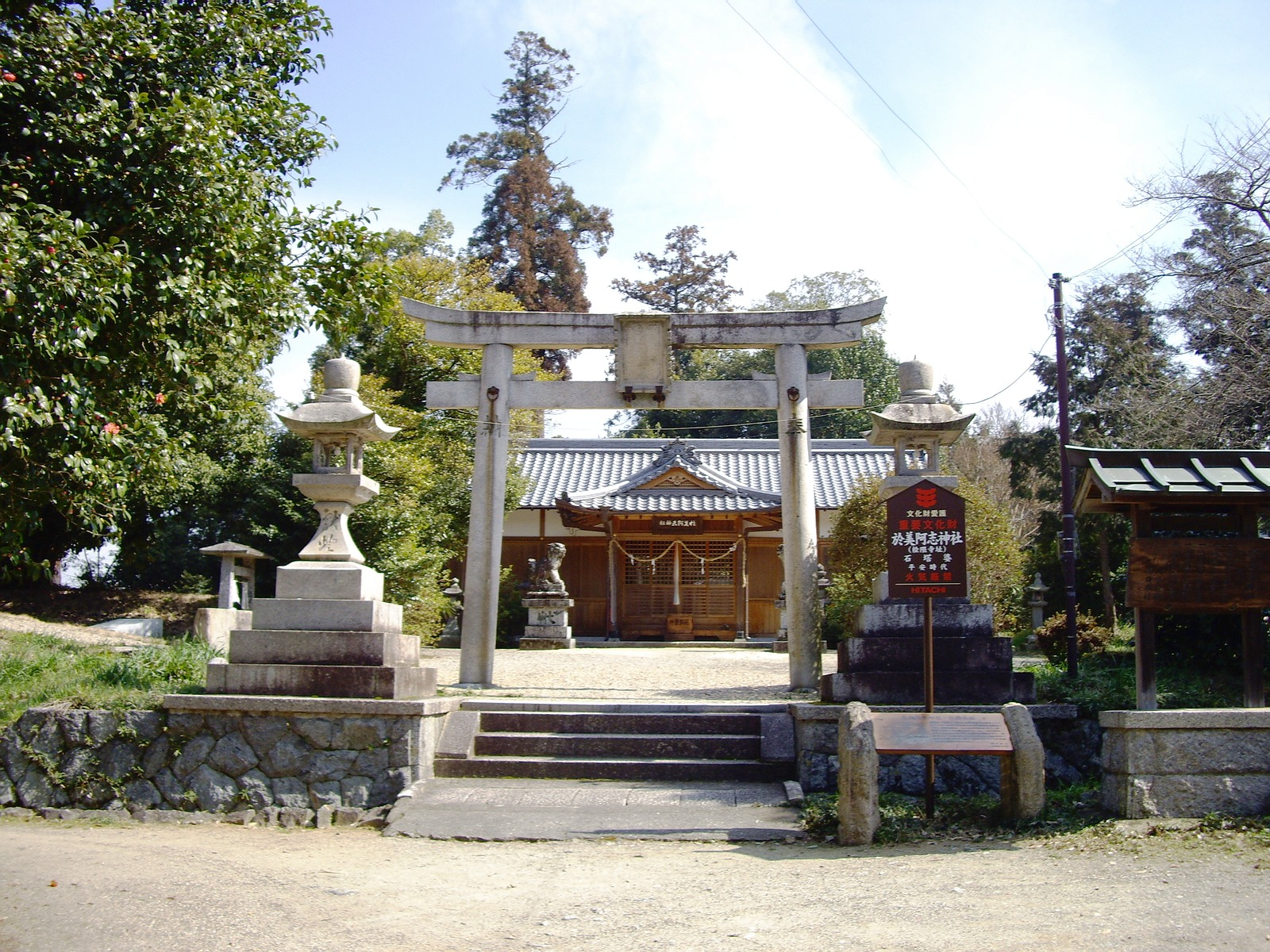
Omiashi-jinja of the Yamato no Aya clan

Aya clans (漢氏, Aya-shi) were collectively known immigrant clans from Korea that were active in Japan since the Kofun period according to the Kojiki (712), Nihon Shoki (720), and Shoku Nihongi (797).

The three main branches of the Aya clan included the Yamato no Aya clan, Kawachi no Aya clan, and the Ayahito clan; though claiming different founders, they all shared the same character of "Aya" in their names and are considered ethnically related.

== Overview ==
Japanese scholars have indicated that the Aya clans were all related and that they were generally classified under the same ethnic group. These mainly included: the Yamato no Aya clan, the Kawachi no Aya clan, and the Ayahito clan. It is said that the Yamato no Aya clan, the Kawachi no Aya clan, and the Ayahito clan, though not from the same founder, were ethnically related, most likely all immigrating from Paekche.

The Kawachi no Aya clan, in particular, is thought to be related with the Yamato no Aya clan.

Yamato no Aya clan also had a related clan called the Sakanoue clan (the clan that Sakanoue no Karitamaro hails from) which was once part of the bigger and more influential Yamato no Aya clan, but later broke off to form a clan of their own.

After the formation of the clans, the next immigrants were mainly called "Imaki no Ayabito (今来漢人/新漢人)" lit. 'Korean people who have just arrived'.

== Etymology ==
In recent times, the character for "Aya (漢)" is analogous with the ancient Han dynasty, hence why the character is heavily associated with China today. However, looking at the character's etymology, it is believed to have been used more leniently than its modern equivalent. The pronunciation of "Aya (あや)" is believed to have derived from the "Kingdom of Aya (安邪国)" and was only given the character of Han (漢) later on. Similar to "Hata (はた)" being written as "Qin (秦)" but having roots in the Koreanic word "Pada/Hada (波多)", and "Kara (から)" being written as "Tang (唐)" but having roots in the "Kingdom of Kara (加羅国)", it is believed to have been directly associated with Korean kingdoms at first, then later expanded to China over several millennia, adopting different characters and interchanging when necessary.

Similar usage of Chinese characters has been observed in Korean as well, with Koreans using "Han (韓; 漢; 幹; 刊)" to represent the native word "Han (한)" meaning "big" or "grand" using the Idu system. Interestingly, the native Korean word "Han" which is directly associated with the Samhan or "three Hans" of Korea, is believed to be the root of the word "Kara" in Japanese as the word "Han" would have been pronounced as "Kar" in Old Korean. Therefore, pronunciations such as "Aya; Hata; Kara" (despite stemming from different roots) were likely brought over by Korean immigrants, whose descendants later incorporated more influential characters to better represent themselves.

== Yamato no Aya clan ==
Yamato no Aya 東漢/倭漢
- Home province: Ara Gaya; Paekche (according to the Kojiki; disputed); Han dynasty (according to the Shoku Nihongi; disputed)
- Titles: Various
- Founder: Achi no Omi (disputed)
- Cadet branches: Ōtomo clan (disputed); Sakanoue clan; Aratai clan; Fumi clan; Ikebe clan; Tani clan; etc

Yamato no Aya clan (東漢氏 or 倭漢氏, Yamatonoaya-shi) was one of the most influential Aya clans in its period.

=== Origins ===
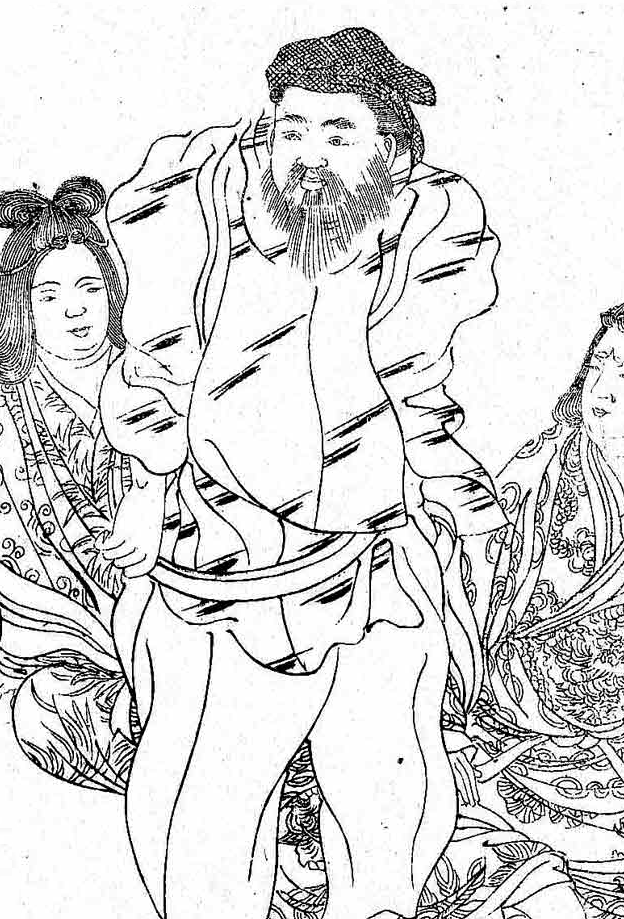
Achi no Omi, the founder of the Yamato no Aya clan from Paekche. (Kikuchi Yōsai, 1903)

Originally, according to ancient Japanese records, Nihon Shoki and Kojiki, Yamato no Aya clan was one of the many clans that arrived from the Korean kingdoms during the reign of Emperor Ōjin. It is said that the clan came from Paekche alongside their ancestor, Achi no Omi and his son, Tsuka no Omi (都加使主).

『廿年 秋九月、倭漢直祖阿知使主、其子都加使主、並率己之黨類十七縣、而來歸焉。』

"20th year, Autumn, September. Achi no Omi, ancestor of the Atahe of the Aya of Yamato (Yamato no Aya), and his son Tsuka no Omi immigrated to Japan, bringing with them a company of their people of seventeen districts."

— Nihon Shoki, September of the 20th year

It is said that the clan started off small but gradually grew as other clans integrated themselves to the clan, later becoming one of the most influential clans in Japan.

It is also said that "Hinokuma no Sato (檜前郡鄕)", present day "Hinokuma (檜前)" of Nara prefecture was a place Yamato no Aya clan had jurisdiction over as well as being a well-known "Paekche town" also known as "Kudara no Sato (百済の里)" in Japanese.

Although oldest sources such as the Kojiki (712) and Nihon Shoki (720) state that the clan and its founder, Achi no Omi, originate from the kingdom of Paekche, the Shoku Nihongi (797) claims that Achi no Omi was a descendant of Emperor Ling of Han. Later, according to the Shinsen Shōjiroku (815), it states that he was rather a descendant of Emperor Xian of Han following the claim made by the Sakanoue clan. (Note: However, due to the Sakanoue clan being blood-relatives of the Yamato no Aya clan, their conflicting claims are causing genealogical confusion among modern historians as both claims are found within the Shinsen Shōjiroku simultaneously under their respective family names.) However, it is believed that the claims of his supposed royal heritage is an embellishment to make him seem more important as his name is recorded under "King Achi (阿智王)" (instead of his given name) likely to emphasize on the idea that he was of noble background. (Note: Similar embellishment happened with Yuzuki no Kimi as "King Yuzuki (弓月王)" of the Hata clan. Historically, neither names were given the title of "king" when they were first recorded in their earliest records.) In actuality, the general consensus by modern historians is that Achi no Omi was likely a fictional individual, as according to historian Hiroshi Kurita (栗田 寛), it was common for Korean descendants to rely on prominent families for their lineage in order to raise their social status. (Note: 『社会的地位を引き上げるために、往々にして朝鮮系が名族に世系を仮託することはよくみられる現象である。』 "It is a common phenomenon for people of Korean descent to rely on noble families for their lineage in order to raise their social status." — 栗田 寛)

According to Teiji Kadowaki (門脇禎二) at Kyoto University, the name "Yamato no Aya" was widely used by Korean immigrants to apply dominance in their newly found home. Similarly with the Hata clan from Silla being wrongfully credited as a kingdom from the Qin dynasty, Yamato no Aya clan is thought to have been misinterpreted as a clan from the Han dynasty and was wrongfully credited as such when in fact, they were originally from Paekche or more recently, Kaya based on historical and archaeological evidence.

=== Etymology ===
"Yamato" in Yamato no Aya meant "east (東)" in Old Japanese as seen in the older spelling of the clan name, thus, "Yamato no Aya" meant "Aya clan of the east". The word "Aya", written as "漢 (Kan; かん)" in on'yomi, does not have a native Japanese etymology and scholars suspect it to be a loanword from a different language as explained above.

Modern Japanese historians theorize that Yamato no Aya clan and its founder Achi no Omi, originated from the Kaya confederacy, specifically from the kingdom of "Aya (安邪)" or "Anra (安羅)" (old name for Ara Gaya) where the placename became the etymology of the Aya clans. According to the theory, the immigrants brought many Paekche technologies from Ara Gaya and were considered as close kin to the people of Paekche. Some nationalist historians used this to support the claims over the Mimana controversy stating that Mimana (Kaya) was in fact Japanese due to the relations between the kingdom of Aya and the Aya clans of Japan. Despite the lukewarm reception in Korea, evidence alludes to the possibilities of Japonic speakers in the region.

=== Achievements ===
It is written both in the Nihon Shoki and the Kojiki that the clan specialized in architecture and carpentry.

There were also heavily militarized, often guarding and protecting high-ranking members of the Soga clan who also had deep connections with the Korean peninsula, specifically the kingdom of Paekche.

=== Legacy ===
On top of being one of the most influential immigrant clans in Japan, clans related to Yamato no Aya became much more prominent after its fall.

The clan was divided into clans with distinct surnames, such as the aforementioned Sakanoue clan, the Fumi clan, the Min clan, the Ikebe clan, and the Aratai clan.

== Kawachi no Aya clan ==
Kawachi no Aya 西漢/河内漢
- Home province: Paekche (according to the Kojiki and Nihon Shoki; disputed); Han dynasty (according to the Shoku Nihongi; disputed)
- Titles: Various
- Founder: Wani (disputed)

Kawachi no Aya clan (西漢氏 or 河内漢氏, Kawachinoaya-shi) was one of the most influential Aya clans in its period. Though it is less known than the Yamato no Aya clan of the east, the clan is known to have been quite influential in western Japan.

=== Origins ===
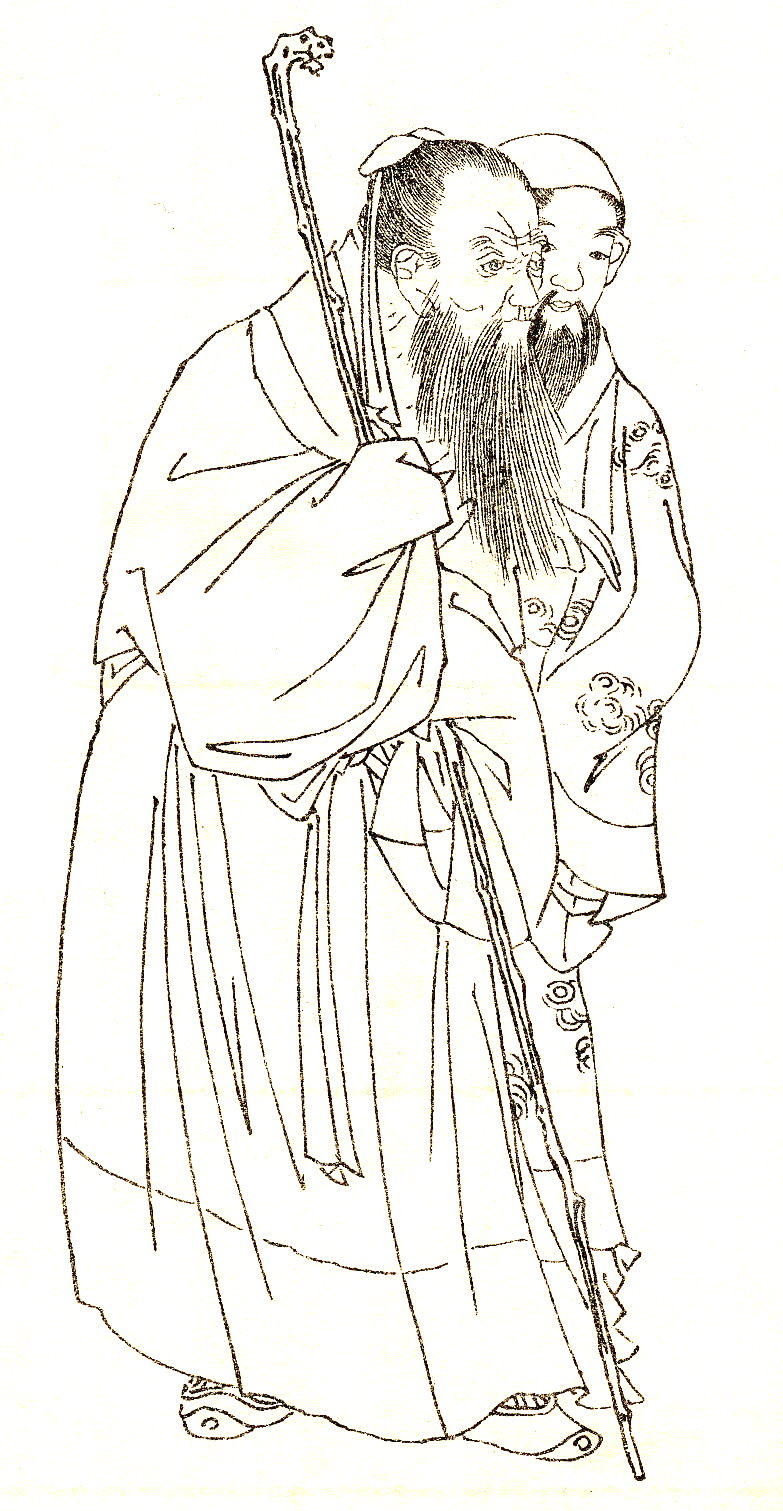
Wani, the founder of the Kawachi no Aya clan from Paekche.

According to the family's genealogy, the clan descends from a Paekche scholar named Wani (originally known as "Wanikishi").

Records such as the Kojiki (712) and Nihon Shoki (720) state that Wani arrived from Paekche under the order of Emperor Ōjin.

"[...] and, [the Emperor Ōjin] ordered [Geunchogo, the King of] Paekche, "If there is any wise man, offer him up as tribute." The person whose name, offered by the command, was Wani-kishi (和邇吉師). And, [the King] gave, as tributes, along with him, ten volumes of the Analects and one volume of the Thousand Character Classic. This Wani-Kishi is the progenitor of the Fumi-no-Obito clan."

— Kojiki, middle volume (Note: Original text: 又，科賜百濟國，若有賢人者，貢上。故受命以貢上人名，和邇吉師。即論語十卷・千字文一卷，并十一卷，付是人即貢進。此和邇吉師者，文首等祖。)

"In the 15th year [of the Emperor Ōjin's reign] (AD 284), in autumn, in August, new moon of rén-xū, dīng-mǎo (the sixth), the King of Paekche dispatched Achiki (Achi no Omi) and offered up two good horses as a tribute [to Japan, along with him]. Then, they were reared in the stable (umaya) atop the hill (saka) of Karu. And, Achiki was entrusted to raise them. Therefore, the place where the horses were raised was called Umayasaka. Achiki also read the Confucian classics well. Then, Prince Uji-no-Waki-Iratsuko took him as his teacher. Now, the Emperor inquired to Achiki, saying, "Is there any scholar superior to you?" He replied, "There is a man called Wani. He is excellent." Then, the Emperor dispatched Aratawake and Kamunagiwake (a male oracle), who were ancestors of the Kamitsuke-no-Kimi clan, to Paekche, to summon Wani. This Achiki is the progenitor of the Achiki-no-Fubito clan. In the 16th year, in spring, in February, Wani had come. Then, Prince Uji-no-Waki-Iratsuko took him as his teacher, learned various classics under him and there was nothing he didn't become thoroughly acquainted with. This so-called Wani was the progenitor of the Fumi-no-Obito clan."

— Nihon Shoki, Vol. 10 (Note: Original text: 十五年秋八月壬戌朔丁卯，百濟王遣阿直岐，貢良馬二匹。即養於輕阪上廄、因以阿直岐令掌飼。故號其養馬之處曰廄阪也。阿直岐亦能讀經典。及太子菟道稚郎子師焉。於是天皇問阿直岐曰，如勝汝博士亦有耶。對曰，有王仁者。是秀也。時遣上毛野君祖荒田別・巫別於百濟，仍徵王仁也。其阿直岐者阿直岐史之始祖也。十六年春二月、王仁來之。則太子菟道稚郎子師之，習諸典籍於王仁莫不通達。所謂王仁者，是書首等始祖也。)

According to Japanese scholars, Wani and Achi no Omi of the Yamato no Aya clan, founded Kawachi no Aya and Yamato no Aya clan respectively, both being of Paekche origin and influential ethnic Koreans in Japan at the time. They shared the same character "Aya" but separated one another with the use of cardinal directions ("Kawachi; 西" meaning West and "Yamato; 東" meaning East) as Wani's Kawachi no Aya clan resided in "Furuichikoori (河内国古市郡)", (present day Furuichigun (古市郡) in Osaka) located in the west of Japan, while Achi no Omi and his Yamato no Aya clan resided in the Yamato Kingdom found in the east.

However, similar to Achi no Omi, where it was later added in the Shoku Nihongi (797) that he was of Han dynasty origin, the founder of Kawachi no Aya clan, Wani was also later added to have come from Han dynasty in the same book. Similar to Achi no Omi, the modern consensus is that this is also an aggrandization with many believing that the founders were more likely fictional than factual. In actuality, the clan is most likely an immigrant (Toraijin) clan which subsequently claimed Wani as their ancestor.

=== Etymology ===
"Kawachi" in Kawachi no Aya meant "west (西)" as well as "river-side (河内)" in Old Japanese as seen in the older spelling of the clan name, thus, "Kawachi no Aya" meant "Aya clan of the west" or "Aya clan of the river-side". The word "Aya", written as "漢 (Kan; かん)" in on'yomi, does not have a native Japanese etymology and scholars suspect it to be a loanword from a different language as explained above.

== Ayahito clan ==
Ayahito 漢人
- Home province: Paekche
- Titles: Various
- Founder: Tayaka (多夜加; disputed)

Ayahito clan (漢人氏, Ayahito-shi) was one of the Aya clans that claimed to have hailed from Paekche.

=== Origins ===
According to the family's genealogy, the clan descends from a Paekche individual named "Tayaka (多夜加)" though records surrounding him are scarce.

Similar to the other Aya clans, it is speculated that the Ayahito clan was a cadet branch clan of the bigger Aya family and only claimed Tayaka as their founder later on. His existence is also under scrutiny by modern Japanese historians.

== Relations with the Fumi clans ==
As mentioned above, it is believed that the Aya clans in general, though each self-proclaiming to have descended from different individuals, were most likely ethnically related people from a common group. Likewise, it is believed that the Fumi clans were related to the Aya clans as well. (Note: 『漢氏の祖、都加使主と文忌寸の祖、都賀直は同一人物なので坂上氏と文氏は、ここに記されている通りの同族です。王仁は書首（文首）の祖とされ、阿知使主、都加使主は漢人の祖とされて、別の氏族のように扱われていますが、実際には、文氏、漢氏はごく近い親戚なのです。』 "The ancestor of the Aya clans, Tsuka no Omi, and the ancestor of Fumi no Imiki, Tsuga no Atai, are the same person, so the Sakanoue clan and the Fumi clan are actually of the same clan. Wani is considered the ancestor of the Kawachinoaya no Fubito (Fumi no Kōbi), and Achi no Omi and Tsuka no Omi are considered the ancestors of the Aya people, and they are treated as separate clans, but in reality, the Fumi clans and the Aya clans are very close relatives." — 塚田 敬章, 帰化人 漢氏と文氏) It is believed that the ancestor of the Aya clans, Tsuka no Omi (son of Achi no Omi), was also written as "Tsuka no Atai (都賀直)" and the name Tsuka no Atai is said to have been the ancestor to many of the Fumi clans, according to their self-proclaimed genealogies.

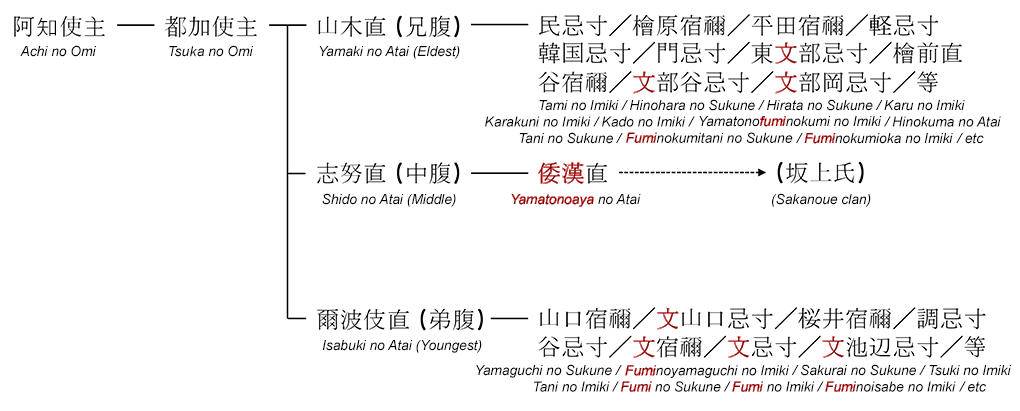
Genealogy of Achi no Omi and his descendants. Several of the Fumi clans were descendants of the Yamato no Aya clan's ancestor, Tsuka no Omi.

In essence, Yamato no Aya clan claims descent from Yamato no Aya no Atai (倭漢直), who in turn descends from Shido no Atai (志努直). Shido no Atai was the second son of Tsuka no Omi, and had one older brother, Yamaki no Atai (山木直), and one younger brother, Isabuki no Atai (爾波伎直). Both Yamaki no Atai and Isabuki no Atai were ancestors to many Fumi-related clans (such as the Yamato no Fumi clan [東文氏]) which are believed to have been related with the clans founded by Wani. Despite the modern consensus declaring that legendary individuals such as Achi no Omi and Wani most likely being fictional characters, their genealogies show hints of possible historical connections with clans in ancient Japan at the time.

Many of the branch clans of the Yamato no Aya clan later incorporated names under their parent clan's cousin clans; names including the Fumi clan (書氏), the Tami clan (民氏), the Ikebe clan (池辺氏), and the Aratai clan (荒田井氏) were reused. (Note: ・The Fumi clan (書氏) reused the meaning from the related Fumi (文氏) clans. ・The Tami clan (民氏) reused the meaning from Tami no Imiki (民忌寸)'s clan. ・The Ikebe clan (池辺氏) reused the meaning from the Fumiisabe no Imiki (文池辺忌寸)'s clan.)

== Notable members ==
- Achi no Omi - Founder of the Yamato no Aya clan.
- Wani - Founder of the Kawachi no Aya clan.

== See also ==
- Japanese clans#Immigrant clans: List of Toraijin clans of different origins.
  - Hata clan
  - Tatara clan
  - Toyoda clan
  - Ōtomo clan
