= Sakanoue clan =

Japanese samurai clan

Sakanoue 坂上
- Home province: Soekami
- Parent house: Yamato no Aya clan
- Titles: Various
- Founder: Sakanoue no Atai Shina
- Founding year: 7th century
- Dissolution: Unknown (likely succeeded or absorbed by cadet branch clans)
- Cadet branches: Ōtomo clan (disputed); Tamura clan; Hata clan (not to be confused with the Hata clan); Hirano clan; Karakuchi clan; Karakuni clan; Sueyo clan; Yamaguchi clan; etc

Sakanoue clan (坂上氏, Sakanoue-shi) was a Japanese clan during the Asuka period that claimed descent from the Yamato no Aya clan.

== Origin ==
Its parent clan (Yamato no Aya clan) is believed to have immigrated to Japan from Korea during the Kofun period.

It is said that the early members of the Sakanoue clan (still called "Yamato no Aya") began to stray away from its parent clan due to political friction. From the 6th to the 7th century, the offshoot families adopted names of provinces and workplaces to identify themselves. However, since they were still recorded under "Yamato no Aya", now using "倭漢" instead of "東漢", it is believed that they did not achieve full autonomy from their parent clan.

It wasn't until the end of Jinshin War when the members were given different titles for their efforts, where the name "Sakanoue" was given with the title of "Imiki (忌寸)" in 685. Imiki was a common title that was given to clans of foreign origin under the kabane system.

== History ==
=== Asuka period ===
The Sakanoue clan's base was Soekami, Yamato Province. One of Sakanoue Shizuna's children, Sakanoue no Komako (坂上駒子), had a son named Sakanoue no Yumitaka (坂上弓束), who was also known as Sakanoue no Sumina (坂上首名), Sakanoue no Okuni (坂上大国), and Sakanoue no Kunimaro (坂上国麻呂), played an active role on the side of Prince Ōama (Emperor Tenmu) during the Jinshin War.

=== Nara period ===
Sakanoue no Okuni (坂上大国), who rose to the rank of Captain of the Right Guard in the early Nara period, was a military officer and the first member of the Sakanoue clan whose military career is known. Okuni's son, Sakanoue no Inukai (坂上犬養), was recognized for his military qualities and favored by Emperor Shōmu.

=== Heian period ===
The clan reached its peak with Sakanoue no Tamuramaro, son of Sakanoue no Karitamaro and a famous shōgun of the Heian period. His descendants later gained jurisdiction in Tōhoku region and intermarried with several of the nobles until they moved to Tokyo during the Meiji period.

== Legacy ==
Later in the Heian period, Sakanoue no Tamuramaro founded a cadet branch clan called the Tamura clan. The clan became an important family during the Sengoku period and the Edo period, marrying many of its women into more powerful clans such as the Date clan.

The third son of Sakanoue no Atai Shina, Sakanoue no Ara (坂上阿良) left the family to create his own clan. This newly founded clan known as the "Hata clan (波多氏)" carried over an ancient spelling claimed previously by a clan of the same name, but one that hails from Silla. For context, the older Hata clan, though currently written as "秦", had a parent clan that was recorded under "波多" and is believed to have roots in the Korean word "Pada (바다)" meaning "ocean", since the immigrants most likely arrived in Japan from the seas (see etymology of the Hata clan's name). It is likely that the foreign element in the word "波多" was a desirable choice of rebranding for a descendant clan that also had a parent clan that had roots outside of Japan. (Note: However, unlike the original Hata clan, Sakanoue no Ara's Hata clan is believed to have roots in Paekche and not Silla (through the Yamatonoaya clan). Interestingly, the claim of Paekche roots is under scrutiny in recent years due to archaeological and historical inconsistency, and is believed to have come from Gaya, specifically of Ara Gaya. In essence, the consensus is that these clans share a common Korean root, regardless of the specific kingdoms.) This is evident in the clan's bestowment of the name "Imiki" which was shared with the Hata clan and its descendants, likely creating a sense of bond and familiarity across clans of foreign origin.

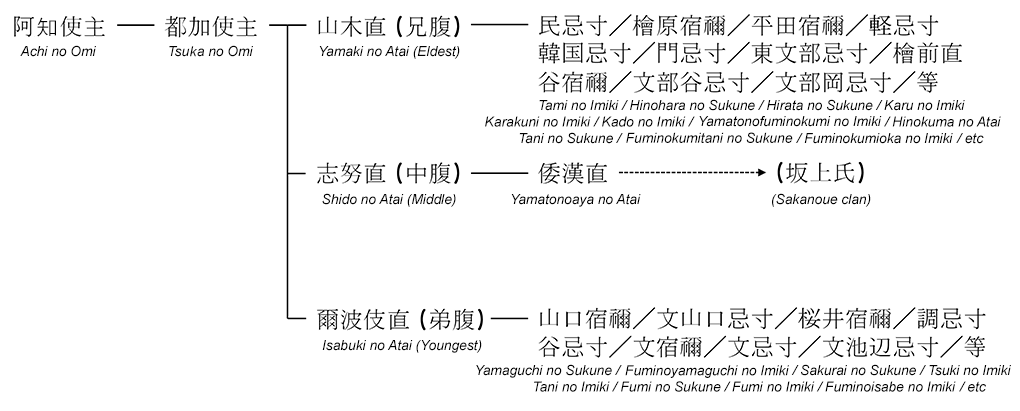
Genealogy of Achi no Omi and his descendants.

According to the family's genealogy, Achi no Omi's son Tsuka no Omi's eldest son Yamaki no Atai (山木直) became the ancestor to several descendant clans, one of which was the Karakuni clan (韓国氏) literally meaning the "Nation of Korea" clan, and the Karakuchi clan (韓口氏) literally meaning the "Mouth of Korea" clan. The name is deemed to have carried a sentiment similar to the aforementioned "Hata clan" of Sakanoue no Ara.

The clan also claimed lineage of a separate immigrant clan known as the Ōtomo clan which is believed to have come from Goguryeo. However, despite not having any shared heritage historically, the clan claimed that the Ōtomo clan descended from Achi no Omi, founder of the Yamato no Aya clan, which ultimately made the Ōtomo clan's lineage historically and genealogically inconsistent and messy.

Several of the clan descendants married into the Japanese Imperial family, specifically daughters of Sakanoue no Tamuramaro. Emperor Kanmu, who was also of foreign origin (through his mother Takano no Niigasa's clan, Yamato no Fuhito clan to the kingdom of Paekche), married with several women of foreign ancestry including women from the Sakanoue clan and the Kudara no Konikishi clan.

== Notable members ==
- Sakanoue no Karitamaro
- Sakanoue no Tamuramaro

== See also ==
- Yamato no Aya clan
- Tamura clan
