= Shoku Nihongi =

Ancient Japanese history text

The Shoku Nihongi (続日本紀) is an imperially-commissioned Japanese history text. Completed in 797, it is the second of the Six National Histories, coming directly after the Nihon Shoki and followed by Nihon Kōki. Fujiwara no Tsugutada and Sugano no Mamichi served as the primary editors. It is one of the most important primary historical sources for information about Japan's Nara period.

The work covers the 95-year period from the beginning of Emperor Monmu's reign in 697 until the 10th year of Emperor Kanmu's reign in 791, spanning nine imperial reigns. It was completed in 797 AD.

The text is forty volumes in length. It is primarily written in kanbun, a Japanese form of Classical Chinese, as was normal for formal Japanese texts at the time. However, a number of senmyō (宣命) or "imperial edicts" contained within the text are written in a script known as "senmyō-gaki", which preserves particles and verb endings phonographically.

Although the period it covers was marked by a fundamental crisis of imperial authority, after 765, during the reign of Empress Shōtoku, the emperors' real power entered a terminal decline in favor of the court clans, a shift that eventually led to the transfer of the capital to Heian and the establishment of the shogunate, the Shoku Nihongi largely minimizes these developments, continuing to celebrate the authority of Emperors Shōtoku, Kōnin, and Kanmu even as most of their real power had already dissipated.
