= Sue clan =

Japanese samurai clan

Sue 陶
- The Sue clan shared its emblem (mon) with the Ōuchi clan
- Home province: Suō
- Parent house: Migitashi clan
- Founder: Sue Hirokata
- Final ruler: Sue Harukata
- Dissolution: 1555

Sue clan (陶氏, Sue-shi) was a Japanese clan during the Heian period that claimed descent from the Migitashi clan (右田氏), a cadet branch clan of the Ōuchi family therefore in turn, the ancient Tatara clan.

== Etymology ==
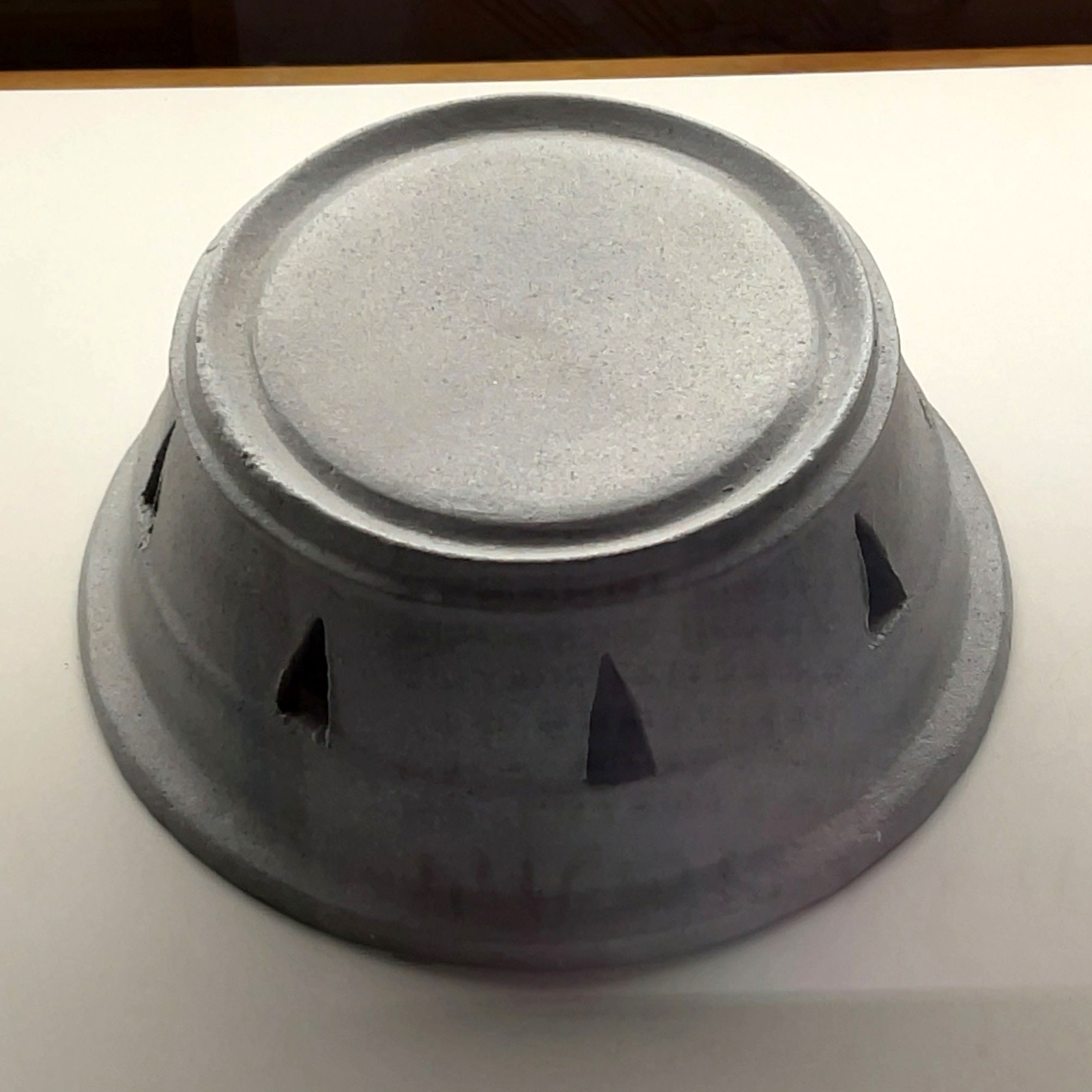
An example of Sue pottery, the style the Sue clan took its name.

Historically. Toraijins from the Kaya confederacy, regarded as the main pillars of Sue pottery in Japan, naturalized and became separate clans. One of which was given the name "Sue (陶/すえ)". The name derives from "Sueki (須恵器/すえき)", the official name for Sue-style pottery, where later in the Heian period, it was written as "Suemono (陶器/すえもの)" in alternate characters.

== Origin ==
The origins of the Sue clan is rather convoluted with multiple accounts made through chronologically confusing and historically inconsistent events. According to the clan's genealogy, the founder of the clan, Sue Hirokata (陶弘賢) was a member of the Migitashi clan. The Migitashi clan was a cadet branch clan of the powerful Ōuchi clan which claims descent from Prince Imseong of Paekche. However, according to the Shinsen Shōjiroku (815), the Ōuchi also claimed descent from another ancient clan of different origin known as the Tatara clan. The Tatara family is believed to have come from Kaya confederacy rather than Baekje which contradicts the claims found in the clan's genealogical records. Modern Japanese scholars began questioning the legitimacy of the claim over the Ōuchi clan's heritage, positing whether the prince was their actual ancestor. Despite the descendants firmly believing that their royal lineage to the Korean prince is true, historians postulate that their true origin most likely lies in Kaya rather than Baekje evident in the clan members claiming descent from the Tatara clan in the Shinsen Shōjiroku and the Sue clan adopting the character from a pottery style that is famous for its Kaya roots.

However, it is unclear if the Tatara clan was a parent clan of the Ōuchi family or just a sister clan as the name is included separately in the Shinsen Shōjiroku alongside the claim made by the family.

== History ==
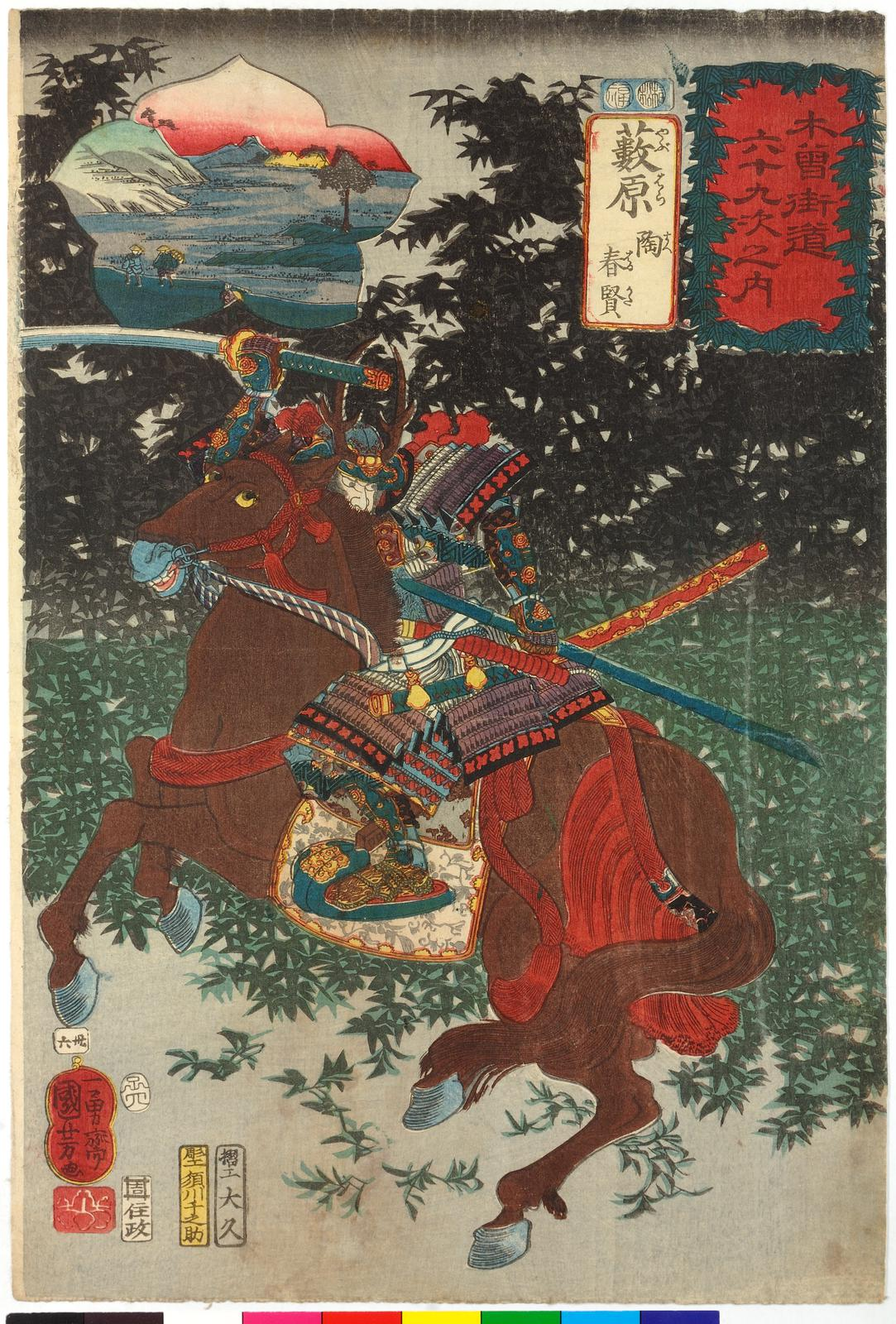
Sue Harukata, the most famous member of the Sue clan and its final ruler.

During the Kamakura period and Sengoku period, the Sue clan was given special treatment from another Korea-originating, but more powerful Ōuchi clan for having similar roots. This is evident in the fact that many of the Sue clan's members were hereditary retainers to the Ōuchi family. (Note: The Sue family was a lateral branch clan of the Ōuchi (through the Migitashi clan) similar to the Sō and Shimazu clan to the Hata clan (through the Koremune clan) making them distant, but related families.)

Eventually in 1551, a senior retainer of the Ōuchi clan, Sue Harukata successfully overthrew his master, Ōuchi Yoshitaka during the Tainei-ji incident. Harukata put Ōuchi Yoshinaga as the head of the Ōuchi family despite Yoshinaga not being part of the clan (he was originally from the Ōtomo clan). Harukata's reign continued with Yoshinaga acting as a puppet ruler and head of clan in name only until Mōri Motonari, another retainer of the Ōuchi clan, revolted and deposed both Yoshinaga and Harukata, ending the Ōuchi clan and Sue clan's reign.

== Notable members ==
- Sue Harukata

== See also ==
- Sue pottery
- Ōuchi clan
- Tatara clan
- Mōri clan
