= Sue pottery =

Type of pottery from Japan and Korea

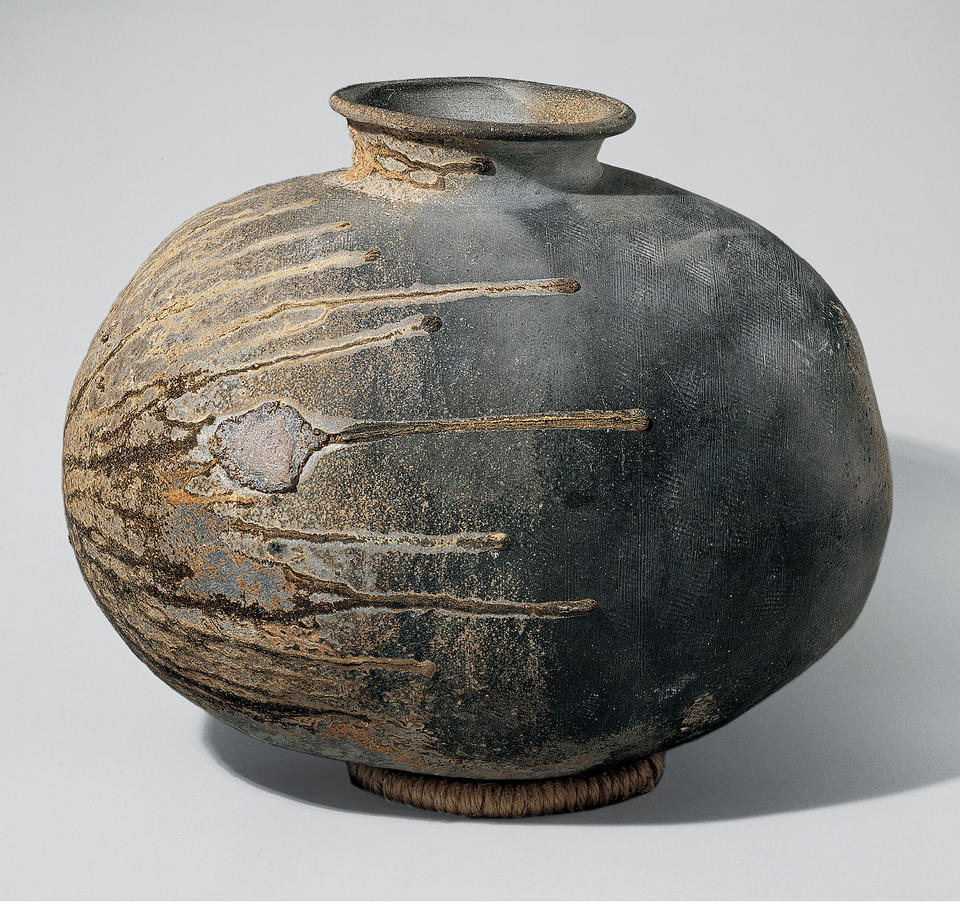
Sue stoneware recumbent bottle (yokobe) with partial covering of natural ash glaze, late Kofun period, 6th century

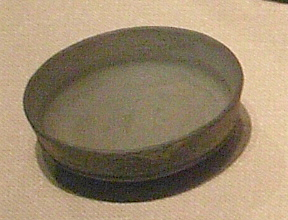
Sue pottery vessel, excavated in Aomori Prefecture, Kofun period, 5th century CE

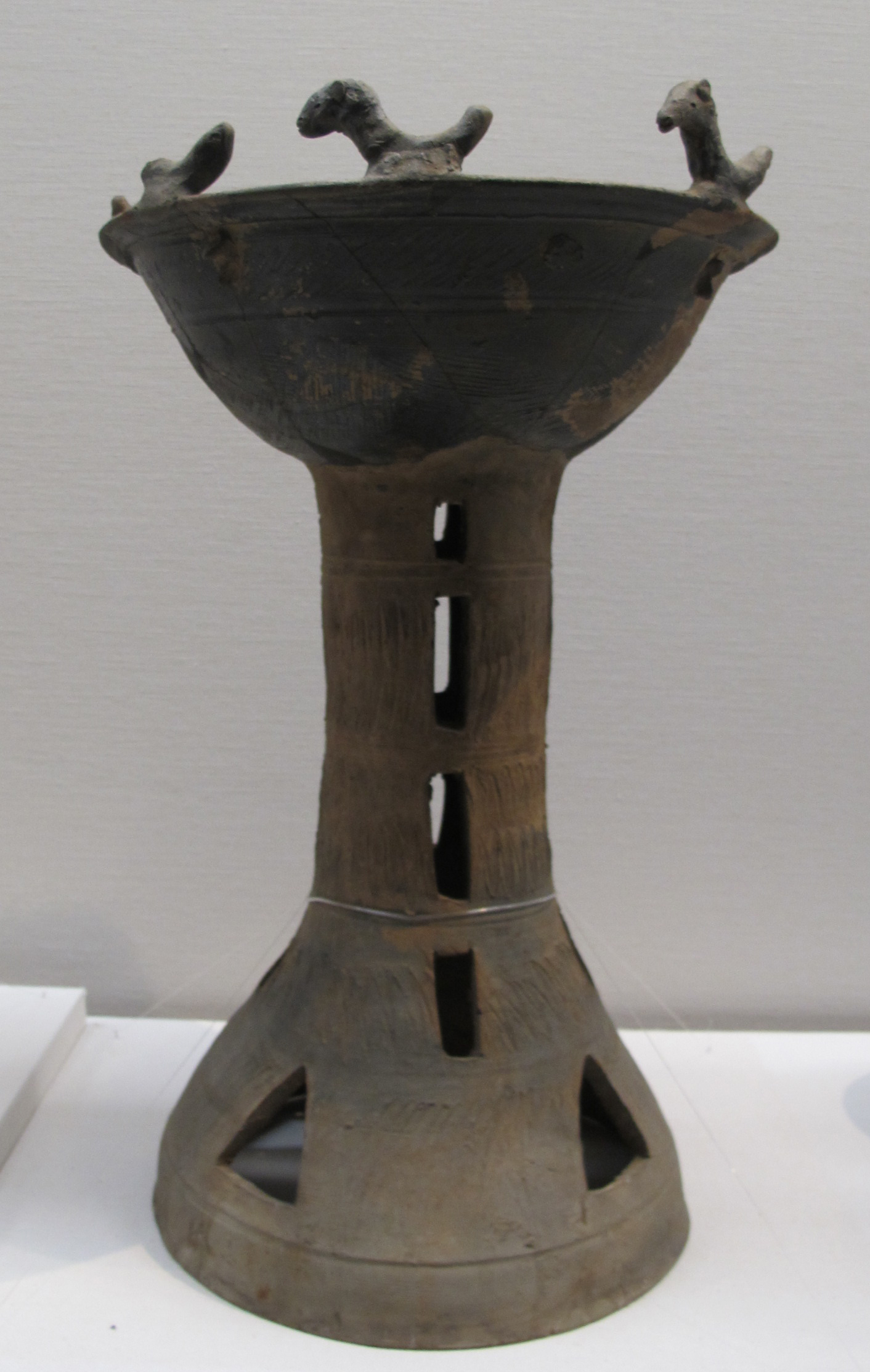
Sue pottery jar with birds decoration, Kofun period, 6th century

Sue pottery (須恵器, sueki; literally offering ware) was a blue-gray form of stoneware pottery fired at high temperature, which was produced in Japan and southern Korea during the Kofun, Nara, and Heian periods of Japanese history. It was initially used for funerary and ritual objects, and originated from Korea to Kyūshū. Although the roots of Sueki reach back to ancient China, its direct precursor is the grayware of the Three Kingdoms of Korea.

== History ==
The term Sue was coined in the 1930s by the archaeologist Shuichi Goto (後藤 守一) from a reference to vessels mentioned in the 8th century Japanese classical poetry anthology Man'yōshū. Previous to this, the terms iwaibe doki (祝部土器) or Chōsen doki (朝鮮土器 lit. 'Korean pottery') were in more common use.

Sue pottery is believed to have originated in the 5th or 6th century in the Gaya region of southern Korea, and was brought to Japan by immigrant craftsmen. It was contemporary with the native Japanese Haji pottery, which was more porous and reddish in color. Sue ware was made from coils of clay, beaten and smoothed or carved into shape, and then fired in an oxygen-reduction atmosphere of over 1000 °C. The resulting stoneware was generally unglazed, but sometimes displays an accidental partial covering of ash glaze, which melted in drips onto the ceramic pieces' surfaces as they were being fired.

Sue pottery was produced in numerous locations around Japan, including southern Osaka Prefecture, along the coast of the Inland Sea and parts of eastern Honshū. It was used for the roof tiles of the Kokubunji system of Provincial temples erected in the Nara period. By the end of early 7th century, its position as an elite product was eroded by mass production, and by the imports of the new three-color ceramics from Tang China. By the Heian period, Sue ware had become a utilitarian pottery, and it became the ancestor of a number of regional ceramics such as Bizen ware.

== Legacy ==
In Heian period, Sue pottery was written as "陶器 (Suemono/すえもの)" in alternate characters.

Toraijins from Gaya confederacy, regarded as the main pillars of Sue pottery in Japan, were given the name "Sue (陶)" for their newly founded clan. During the Kamakura period and Sengoku period, the Sue clan was given special treatment from another Korea-originating, but more powerful Ōuchi clan for having similar roots. Eventually in 1551, Sue Harukata successfully overthrew his master, Ōuchi Yoshitaka during the Tainei-ji incident. Harukata put Ōuchi Yoshinaga as the head of the Ōuchi family despite Yoshinaga not being part of the clan (he was originally from the Ōtomo clan). Harukata's reign continued with Yoshinaga acting as a puppet ruler and head of clan in name only until Mōri Motonari, another retainer of the Ōuchi clan, revolted and deposed both Yoshinaga and Harukata, ending the Ōuchi clan and Sue clan's reign.
