= Wakayama Castle (Suō) =

Castle ruins in Shūnan, Yamaguchi, Japan

- 若山城
- Shūnan, Yamaguchi, Japan
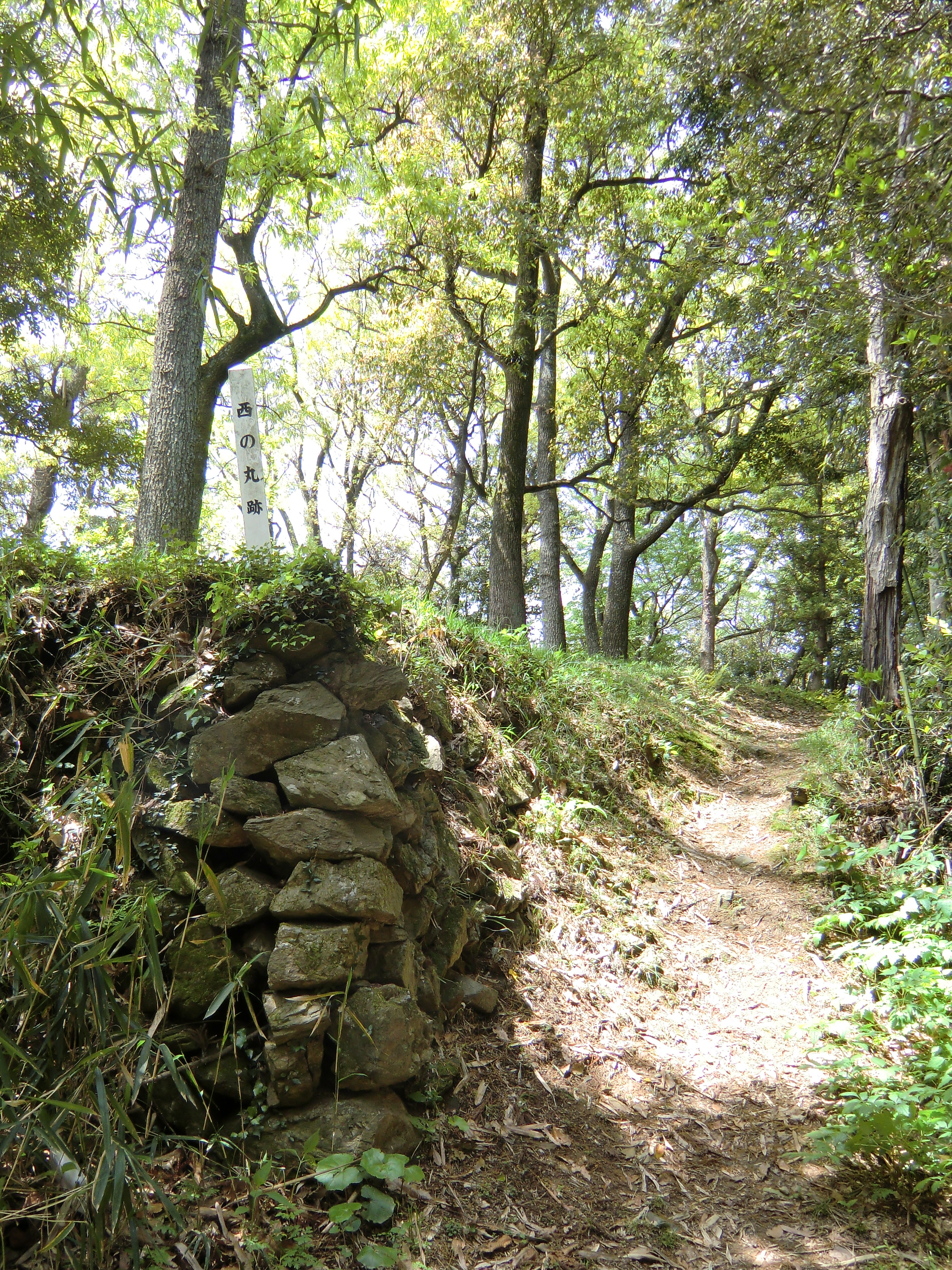
- Wakayama Castle ruins

Site information
- Type: yamajiro-style Japanese castle
- Condition: ruins

Location
- Wakayama Castle Wakayama Castle (Japan)
- Coordinates: 34°05′3.62″N 131°43′40.08″E

Site history
- Built: 15th century
- Demolished: c.1557
- Yamaguchi Prefecture Historic Site

Wakayama Castle (若山城, Wakayama-jō) was a Sengoku period yamajiro-style Japanese castle located in Tomita, Tsuno District, Suō Province in what is now the city of Ube, Yamaguchi Prefecture, Japan. The ruins have been protected as a Yamaguchi Prefectural Historic Site since 1968. It is located on a 217-meter mountain.It was the stronghold of the Sue clan, a cadet branch of the Ōuchi clan.

== Overview ==
Wakayama Castle was a typical yamajiro fortress built to take advantage of the uneven terrain of a mountain, making it difficult for enemies to attack. Near the summit, there are numerous interconnected enclosures (kuruwa) protected by earthen ramparts and dry moats. Mountain castles were only used during wartime; normally, people lived on the flat land at the foot of the mountain. Wakayama Castle was located with the main bailey at the summit of Mount Wakayama (217 meters above sea level) at its center. The second and third baileys were located on the ridge extending to the east, and the western bailey and storehouses were located on the ridge extending to the west. These multi-bailey sections spanned approximately 400 meters. There were dry moats and vertical moats in various places, and many traces of ridge-shaped vertical moats remain, especially on the northeast side of the main bailey. Stone walls can also be seen in part of the western bailey. Located at a strategic point overlooking the San'yōdō highway and the Seto Inland Sea, Wakayama Castle features terraced enclosures called danshō on the section connecting the second bailey to the main bailey and on the eastern ridge, designed to defend against attacks from the sea. The castle is also protected to the west by the Matoba River. To the east, across a deep valley, is Mount Takeyama (364 meters), and beyond that, in the plain, are the remains of the residence and flatland castle of the Sue clan.

In the mid-14th century, Sue Hiromasa (the second head of the Sue clan) moved from Sue Village in Yoshiki District to Tomita-ho in Tsuno District. The Sue clan's entry into Tomita-ho is believed to have been in opposition to the Washizu clan, a branch of the Ōuchi clan based in Washizu-sho (present-day Kudamatsu) in the same district, and there is a theory that Wakayama Castle was built at this time. In 1470, during the Ōnin War, while Ōuchi Masahiro was serving as a general for the Western Army in Kyoto, his uncle, Ōuchi Noriyuki, sided with the Eastern Army and launched a rebellion (the Doton Rebellion). Because local lords of Iwami, such as the Yoshimi clan, also joined the rebellion, Sue Hiromori (7th head of the Sue clan), who was in charge of defending the Ōuchi territory, built Wakayama Castle for defense. Sue Hiromori defeated Ōuchi Noriyuki and suppressed the rebellion, but was later assassinated by Yoshimi Nobuyori at a banquet.

In 1550, Sue Takafusa (Sue Harukata), who was in conflict with Ōuchi Yoshitaka, renovated the castle in preparation for rebellion. The following year, Sue Takafusa raised an army at Wakayama Castle. After attacking Yamaguchi and forcing Yoshitaka to commit suicide (the [[Tainei-ji incident]), he brought Ōtomo Haruhide (Yoshitaka's nephew) from Bungo Province and installed him as Ōuchi Yoshinaga, while he himself changed his name to Harukata and seized real power within the Ōuchi clan.

In 1555, Sue Harukata, who had advanced his army into Aki Province, suffered a crushing defeat at the Battle of Itsukushima against Mōri Motonari and committed suicide. Harukata's son, Nagafusa, who was defending Wakayama Castle, was ambushed by Sugi Shigesuke and his forces of over 200 men, who harbored resentment towards Harukata, and the third bailey was occupied. Nagafusa escaped the castle but was pursued and committed suicide (there are other theories regarding Nagafusa's death, including 1556 and 1557).

In the same year, the Mōri clan's conquest of Suō and Nagato provinces began. In 1557, after the death of Sue Nagafusa, the remaining retainers of the Sue clan defended Wakayama Castle. However, they responded to the Mōri's surrender demands, appointing Nagaya Kojirō as castle commander and defending it with over 200 soldiers. At that point, over 2,000 soldiers from the Sue side advanced from the Yamaguchi area, and the surrendered retainers responded by setting fire to the castle, causing its fall. Subsequently, the castle was abandoned by the Mōri clan.

In 1973, Nanyō Town (the former name of Shin-Nanyō City) established a hiking trail. In 1987, it was designated a cultural property of Yamaguchi Prefecture. From around 1991, local volunteers (now the Association for the Development of the Sue Trail) took the lead in maintaining the castle ruins and hiking trails, planting sakura trees, holding events, and campaigning to attract an NHK taiga drama|historical drama series]]. In 2010, a monument was erected and events were held to commemorate the 540th anniversary of the castle's construction. The path formerly used by retainers of the Sue clan to ascend to the castle is known locally as "Sue no Michi" and was selected in 2004 as one of the "500 Most Beautiful Walking Trails in Japan" by the Japan Walking Association.

Currently, the site is maintained as the Wakayama Castle ruins and are a 20-minute walk from Fukugawa Station on JR West San'yō Main Line (to the trailhead at the base of the mountain), although it is possible to drive up to the second and third baileys.

== See also ==
- List of Historic Sites of Japan (Yamaguchi)
