= Sagara Taketō =

Sagara Taketō

Sagara Taketō (相良 武任; 1498 – 1551) was a samurai and retainer of the Ōuchi clan and a son of Sagara Masato.

Originally from Higo Province, he served the Ōuchi clan as his father had become a retainer of the clan. From around 1543 with the support of Ōuchi Yoshitaka, he led a faction of retainers who preached a softer approach, as opposed to the faction led by Sue Harukata, which preached a hard-line stance. One of the reasons for the internal feud of the Ōuchi clan was a result of Taketo and Harukata arguing over the future course of the clan. In 1550, facing an impending clash with Harukata, he tried to flee to Chikuzen Province, but was captured and placed under house arrest. Taketo tried to appease Harukata by having his daughter marry Harukata's son, but the relationship remained cold.

In 1551, Harukata revolted and Taketo was killed in Hanao Castle during the Tainei-ji incident, during which Yoshitaka also died.
