= 防州 =

防州 may refer to:

- Fang Prefecture (防州), a prefecture between the 11th and 12th centuries in modern Mongolia
- Suō Province, abbreviated name was Bōshū (防州), province of Japan located in what is today the eastern part of Yamaguchi Prefecture
