= Sue Harukata =

16th-century Japanese samurai

- 陶 晴賢
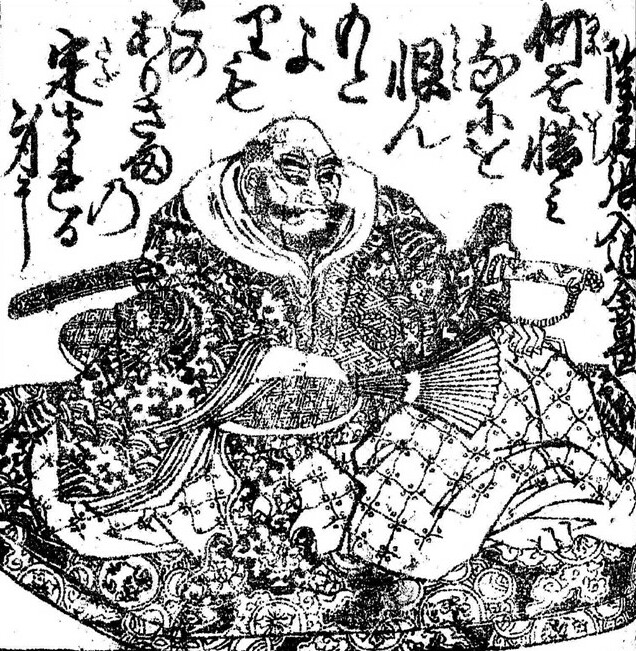
- Born: 1521
- Died: October 16, 1555 (aged 33–34); Itsukushima, Japan
- Other name: Sue Takafusa
- Occupation: Shugodai of Suō Province
- Known for: Siege of Gassantoda Castle; Tainei-ji incident Battle of Miyajima
- Family: Sue clan

Sue Harukata (陶 晴賢; 1521 – October 16, 1555) was a Japanese samurai who served as a senior retainer of the Ōuchi clan in the Sengoku period in Japan. He was the second son of Sue Okifusa, a senior retainer of the Ōuchi clan. His childhood name was Goro, and he previously had the name Takafusa (隆房).

== Biography ==
Harukata was born to the Sue clan (derived from Sue pottery), which was related to the Ōuchi clan, and served as shugodai of Suō Province. As a boy, he served Ōuchi Yoshitaka, a childhood friend. After genpuku, he was given the name Takafusa after Ōuchi Yoshitaka.

In 1539, after his father Okifusa died of illness, he became the head of the Sue clan. Being an able retainer, he became known as the Samurai General Without Peer in the Western Provinces (Saigoku-musō no Samuraidaishō).

From 1540 to 1542, he worked as the general, replacing Ōuchi Yoshitaka, in the war with the Amago clan. However, when Ōuchi's troops lost heavily in 1542, Yoshitaka's interest in war faded, and he began to incline to cultural activities. Because of this, the civil official Sagara Taketō became close to Yoshitaka, and Harukata's relationship with Yoshitaka declined.

In 1551, Harukata succeeded in the coup against Ōuchi Yoshitaka, killing Sagara Taketō and leading Yoshitaka to commit suicide. The next year Harukata secured the control of the Ōuchi clan by making the adopted son of Yoshitaka, Ōuchi Yoshinaga (who was Ōtomo Haruhide, the half-brother of Ōtomo Sōrin), the head of the clan. At this time he changed his name from Takafusa to Harukata, as his master changed from Yoshitaka to Haruhide. Subsequently, he conducted a large military expansion, but this led to discontent among the retainers of the Ōuchi clan.

In 1554 Yoshimi Masayori of Iwami Province, Yoshitaka's brother-in-law, and Mōri Motonari of Aki Province rebelled against Harukata.

In the Battle of Oshikibata, Sue Harukata's retainer Takagawa, was defeated by Mori Motonari.

In 1555 Harukata lost the Battle of Itsukushima to Mōri Motonari, and committed suicide after the battle. After the loss, his son Nagafusa was attacked by the Mōri clan and committed seppuku in Wakayama castle and the Ōuchi clan declined considerably. Two years later, Mōri Motonari annihilated the clan.

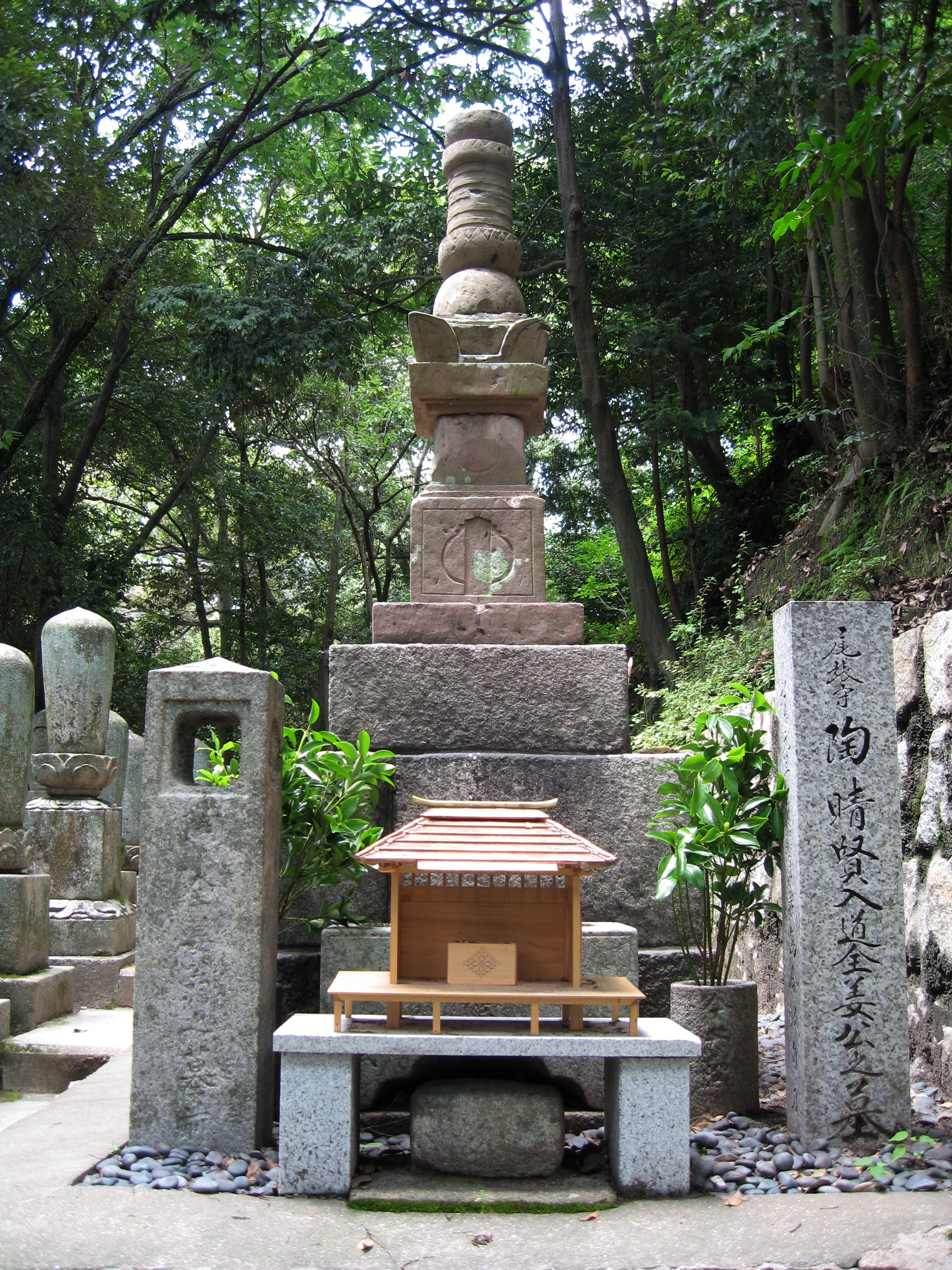
Sue Harukata's grave in the grounds of Tōun-ji, Hatsukaichi, Japan
