= Tainei-ji incident =

Coup attempt in 1551 in Japan

- Part of the Sengoku period
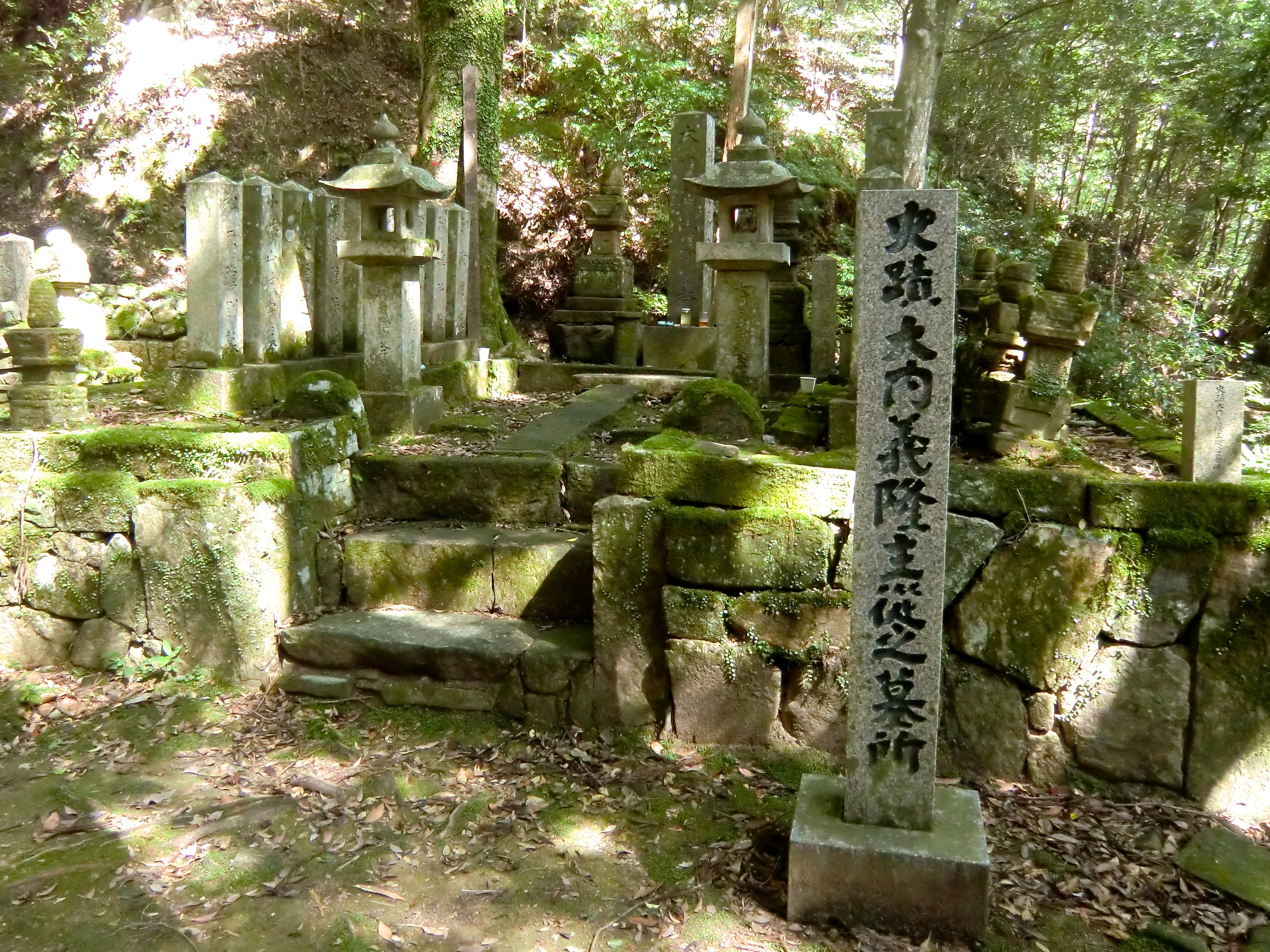
- The graves of Ōuchi Yoshitaka and his valet in the grounds of Tainei-ji, Nagato, Yamaguchi
Date	September 28–30, 1551
Location	Tainei-ji temple, Nagato Province (present-day Yamaguchi Prefecture), Japan 34°19′40″N 131°9′46″E
Result	Sue victory

Belligerents
Ōuchi forces under Sue Takafusa	Close retainers of Ōuchi Yoshitaka

Commanders and leaders
Sue Takafusa; Sugi Shigenori; Naitō Okimori	Ōuchi Yoshitaka ‡‡; Sagara Taketō †

Strength
5,000	Originally 3,000, but only 20 left in the end after defections and desertions

The Tainei-ji incident (大寧寺の変, Taineiji no Hen) was a coup d'état in September 1551 led by Sue Takafusa (later known as Sue Harukata) against Ōuchi Yoshitaka, hegemon and shugo daimyō of western Japan, which ended in the latter's forced suicide in Tainei-ji, a temple in Nagato Province. The coup put an abrupt end to the prosperity of the Ōuchi clan, though they ruled western Japan in name for another six years under the figurehead Ōuchi Yoshinaga, who was not related to the Ōuchi by blood.

== Background ==
The Ōuchi clan was one of the most powerful and important families in Japan during the reign of the Ashikaga shogunate in the 12th to 16th centuries. Expanding out from Suō Province towards the western end of Honshu, the Ōuchi domains at their height comprised six provinces. They were among the primary families involved in foreign trade and relations, particularly with Ming China. Under the patronage of the 31st family head Ōuchi Yoshitaka, the Ōuchi home city Yamaguchi prospered greatly from the cultivation of the arts and foreign trade, attracting famed artists, Chinese merchants, and Jesuit missionaries (such as Francis Xavier) to his city.

At the same time, Yoshitaka fostered a close relationship with Emperor Go-Nara in Kyoto, and sponsored many imperial rites that the imperial court could not have afforded otherwise. On March 27, 1551, the embattled emperor appointed Ōuchi Yoshitaka as Acting Governor of Yamashiro (山城権守), the home province where the imperial capital Kyoto was located, in a bid to leverage the Ōuchi against the ravages of the warlord Miyoshi Nagayoshi, who occupied the capital. Yoshitaka, as Acting Governor of Yamashiro and, by extension, the protector of the court, embarked on a daring plan to relocate the emperor and the court to Yamaguchi. High-ranking courtiers and performers of imperial rites moved to Yamaguchi, including dignitaries such as former regent (kampaku) Nijō Tadafusa and retired Grand Minister (Sadaijin) Sanjō Kin'yori (三条公頼; father-in-law of daimyō Takeda Shingen). By the end of the eighth month of 1551, nearly the whole court, save for the emperor himself and the palace ladies, was in Yamaguchi.

The military establishment of the Ōuchi opposed Yoshitaka's plan to settle the imperial court in Yamaguchi: such a move would see privileges accorded to the courtiers and undermine the military's standing in the Ōuchi clan. In addition, the plan was prohibitively expensive. This faction, represented by Sue Takafusa, also felt that Yoshitaka had become "weak" due to his complete obsession with the arts to the detriment of military matters after the failed siege of Gassantoda Castle in 1543 against the Amago clan. Sue Takafusa, one of Yoshitaka's deputy shugodai, also took personal offence at the rise of the calligrapher Sagara Taketō, who benefitted from Yoshitaka's inward turn toward literary and courtly pursuits.

Takafusa's dissatisfaction was such that another of Yoshitaka's shugodai, Sugi Shigenori (杉重矩), warned that Takafusa had started conspiring against Yoshitaka by extension. However, Yoshitaka dismissed the threat, which caused Shigenori to lose confidence in Yoshitaka's judgement and to throw his lot in with Takafusa. Yoshitaka apparently placed his faith in his ally Mōri Motonari to come to his rescue in case trouble came from within; he did not know that Takafusa had already gotten Motonari's tacit approval for his coup. At the eve of his rebellion, Takafusa not only gained the support of fellow Ōuchi shugodai Sugi Shigenori and Naitō Okimori (内藤興盛), but also that of the Ōuchi's rival daimyō Ōtomo Sōrin in Kyushu. He was also supported financially by the merchants of Sakai, who were incensed at Yoshitaka's tolerance and patronage of the Murakami pirates collecting tolls on the Seto Inland Sea's traffic lanes.

== Coup ==
On 28 September, the rebel forces were assembled and started to march on Yamaguchi. Yoshitaka remained convinced that Sugi and Naitō would remain loyal, such that when the combined forces of Sue, Sugi and Naitō reached Yamaguchi, Yoshitaka could not mount an effective defence and had to flee the city, which the rebels set on fire. Yoshitaka and his close retainers assembled up to 2,000 men at the temple Hōsen-ji (法泉寺) in Ube, where they intended to make the mountain temple a stronghold in which they could fortify themselves; however, this plan evaporated in the night as the defenders deserted or defected to the enemy. Five thousand rebel troops surrounded Hōsen-ji the next day. The former regent Nijō Tadafusa went down the mountain to negotiate with the rebels, where he suggested Yoshitaka could be forced to retire in favour of his heir, but the rebels would not agree to this.

Yoshitaka and his entourage of courtiers and close retainers abandoned Hōsen-ji and made their way to the northern coast of Nagato Province, where they hoped to escape to Iwami Province by boat. However, unfavourable winds pushed them back, and the entourage had to return to shore and seek refuge at the temple Tainei-ji (大寧寺) in Nagato. By this time, only 20 men remained with Yoshitaka. Seeing no way out of their predicament, Yoshitaka composed his death poem and committed seppuku (ritual suicide) on September 30. The rest of his entourage, including his prepubescent sons, his close retainers, and courtiers from the imperial court, soon perished, either following Yoshitaka in suicide or killed by the rebel forces.

Both the victor
and the vanquished are
but drops of dew,
but bolts of lightning –
thus should we view the world.

— Ōuchi Yoshitaka's death poem

== Aftermath ==
After the coup, Takafusa invited the younger brother of Ōtomo Sōrin, Haruhide, as the new head of the Ōuchi clan since this was promised to the Ōtomo in order to gain their support. Ōtomo Haruhide hence became known as Ōuchi Yoshinaga, but Sue Takafusa (known as Sue Harukata after the coup) remained the one pulling the strings behind the scenes. This arrangement alienated his co-conspirators, since they agreed only that Yoshitaka be overthrown in favour of his son. Now that both were dead, Sue Harukata placed the blame on Sugi Shigenori and put him to death. Apprehensive of further purges by Harukata, Naitō Okimori went into retirement and died in 1554.

Mōri Motonari bided his time until 1554, when he declared that the emperor ordered him to punish those who killed Yoshitaka, and rebelled against the nominal Ōuchi government. Sue Harukata was driven to suicide by his defeat at the hands of Motonari in the Battle of Itsukushima in 1555, and in 1557 Ōuchi Yoshinaga followed. The Mōri came to possess the Ōuchi lands in western Honshu thereafter.

The city of Yamaguchi burned during the coup, and looting and violence ran rampant for days after the coup had ended. The Jesuit Juan Fernández, who was at the scene of the chaos in Yamaguchi with Cosme de Torres, described the ensuing violence as "so destructive and deadly that the town was on fire and overflowed with blood for the space of eight days; for with the laws in abeyance, victorious wickedness raged everywhere with impunity, murder and plunder in all directions". The missionaries, despite being harassed during the chaos, escaped harm thanks to the protection given to them by the wife of Naitō Okimori, who was friendly to the Christians. Much was lost when the Ōuchi manor was sacked, including the family archives, countless artifacts, and documents of court rites brought from Kyoto by the courtiers anticipating the move of the capital. (Even the cranes in the Ōuchi household garden were butchered.) Despite efforts at rebuilding, the city was burned again in 1557 and 1569, respectively, in the warfare between the Mōri and the Ōuchi claimants, such that in a space of thirty years after the coup, "no sign of its earlier prosperity remained".

The downfall of the Ōuchi had far-reaching consequence beyond western Honshu. Since the courtiers in Yamaguchi were slaughtered, the imperial court in Kyoto became at the mercy of Miyoshi Nagayoshi. Warriors across Japan no longer ruled through the court, but only used it to confer legitimacy. The once-peaceful Ōuchi territories in northern Kyushu descended into warfare among the Ōtomo, the Shimazu, and the Ryūzōji, who struggled to fill the vacuum. The Ōtomo came to control much of these former Ōuchi domains in northern Kyushu, and their city of Funai flourished as a new centre of trade after the fall of Yamaguchi. At sea, foreign trade with Ming China also suffered. The Ōuchi had been the official handlers of the Japan-China trade, but the Ming Chinese refused to acknowledge the usurpers and cut off all official trade between the two countries. Clandestine trade and piracy replaced the official trade of the Ōuchi, as the Ōtomo, the Sagara, and the Shimazu vied with each other to send ships to China. In the end, it was the Portuguese traders, with their near exclusive access to the Chinese market, who became the most successful intermediaries of the Japan–China trade for the rest of the 16th century.

== See also ==
- Honnō-ji Incident
