= Prince Imseong =

Baekje prince (577–657)

- Hangul: 임성태자
- Hanja: 琳聖太子
- RR: Imseong taeja
- MR: Imsŏng t'aeja

Prince Imseong (琳聖太子, Rinshō Taishi; 577 – November, 657), was the third son of King Seong of Baekje who died in battle with Silla forces in 554. Because of the discrepancies in dates it is thought he was actually third son of Wideok of Baekje. Another way to read or write his name is Rimseong.

In Japan, the legend of Prince Imseong is closely associated with the Ōuchi clan and the introduction of advanced iron-making technology and Myōken faith from Korea.

== Japan ==
Japanese legend has it that after a divine revelation from the deity Hokushin Myōken, Prince Imseong arrived on the shores of Suō Province near present-day Yamaguchi (city) in 597 and was received by Prince Shōtoku. Recognizing the significance of the divine revelation and Prince Imseong's arrival, Prince Shotoku appointed him as the ruler of Suo Province.

The Japanese called him "Rinshō Taishi" because of the Japanese reading of the characters in his name. The Prince's descendants took on the surname Tatara (多々良), which means "cupola furnace" or "foot-operated bellows" in Japanese and later referred to iron-making and forging specialists. The term was related to an ancient Korean port controlled by the Kaya confederacy (which was also famed for its abundant iron mines and their plate armor) in what is now called "Dobijin (蹈鞴津)", which means "Port of Bellows" and was written as "Dadara (多多羅)" for its pronunciation. This place was the major route for exporting iron to Japan. The Tatara clan later changed its name to "Ōuchi", the traditional base of the clan before Ouchi Hiroyo (1325-1380) founded and relocated the clan's base to Yamaguchi.

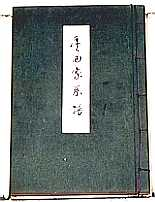
The Toyota Family Genealogy

Another family that stems from the prince is the famous Toyoda/Toyota clan, known for the famous car manufacturer, the Toyota Group. According to the official Toyota Family Genealogy (豊田家系譜; とよたけいふ; Toyotakeifu), the clan descends from Prince Imseong who in turn was a descendant of King Dongmyeong of Goguryeo. This makes the Toyota clan a relative family to the Tatara clan, as well as its cadet branch, the Ōuchi clan.

Historically the Ōuchi clan emphasized their Korean heritage along with their Japanese identity to establish economic power based on international trade and wield political power. The Ouchi clan established their base around Yamaguchi city and later emerged as one of the most powerful clans in Japanese history, particularly during the Muromachi period during which the clan had on a monopoly on trade with Korea (Joseon), with China under the Ming dynasty and with Ryukyu kingdoms, holding so much power that they served as administrators for the shogunate for a time.

According to the Veritable Records of the Joseon Dynasty, in the first year of King Jeongjong's reign (1399), Ōuchi Yoshihiro sent an envoy with a request to confirm his genealogical connection to Paekche royalty, as well as a provocative request for grants of ancestral lands in Chungcheong Province. In response, King Jeongjong provisionally acknowledged Ōuchi Yoshihiro as a descendant of King Onjo of Paekche, even though historical records were insufficient to substantiate the connection. During the reign of King Danjong of Joseon, Ōuchi Norihiro once again requested evidence to verify his lineage. Throughout the years into the next century, the Ōuchis became the most welcomed among the various tributary daimyos from Muromachi Japan, and eventually asked for the cherished Tripitaka Koreana, under the assumption that the now pro-Confucian and anti-Buddhist Joseon dynasty might be willing to part with it. However, the request was declined.

The Ōuchis have been claiming their ancestor had come from Paekche even among the Japanese, when it was more popular to claim connections to Fujiwaras, Heikes, and Genjis, lending credence to their claims. And their Tatara name, connected to the Dadara in Korea, had appeared both in the Shinsen Shōjiroku and Mokkan wooden relics dating from the 9th century.

== Fallen Star Legend ==
A famous legend intertwines the arrival of Prince Imseong, Empress Suiko, Prince Shōtoku, and the introduction of Myōken faith to Japan:

- In ancient times, during the reign of the one-hundred sixth emperor of Japan, Go-Nara-in of Chinzei there was a man named Tandai Ōuchi Tatara Ason Nii Hyōbugyō Yoshitaka. His ancestor was called Prince Rinshō [Imseong], the third son of King Seong of Paekche. Incidentally, on the eighth day of the ninth month of 595 in the reign of Empress Suiko, a big radiant star suddenly fell from the heavens in Aoyanagai no Ura, Washizunoshō Tsuno District, Suō Province and landed on top of a pine tree. It was like the light sent out by a full moon, and it shone for seven days and nights. The various peoples of the region were very surprised and thought it strange. They immediately engaged a shamaness. She spoke, "I am Hokushin Myōken Sonshō, three years from now on the second day of the third month, Prince Imseong of Paekche should come to this country. I have announced this fact to Prince Shōtoku and he has agreed that Prince Imseong should stay. Accordingly, I humbly reported the gist of this to the Empress in Kyoto. Empress Suiko was delighted, and on the second day of the third month of the same fifth year of 597, when over one-hundred imperial court nobles arrived at Tataranohama in Suō Province, the Empress boarded the boat of Prince Imseong and landed at Tataranohama. The prow of the boat was designed as a dragon head and the neck of a fabulous seabird, befitting a noble. She immediately had a palace built in Nagato no Kuni Ōuchi Province and bade him live there. Accordingly, a palace was built promptly for Prince Imseong on Washizuyama. They prayed for the arrival of the deity Hokushin Myōken Sonshō-o, named the place the Star Palace, and fixed the date of worship as the eighteenth day of the ninth month.

This legend continues to be remembered and revered in Japanese folklore, historical narratives and Ouchi clan geneaology books. The fallen star legend about Prince Imseong is central to the history of Kudamatsu (下松) in Yamaguchi Prefecture, a city named after the legendary pine tree where the star is said to have fallen. The legend is commemorated in the city's Star Tower (Hoshi no Tō) in Kudamatsu Park and also features prominently in the city's tourism material. The legend of Prince Imseong's arrival is retold during local festivals and events, reinforcing the city's heritage.

Myōkengu Juto-ji Temple (妙見宮鷲頭寺), located in Kudamatsu, is said to have been established by Prince Imseong in the 7th century after his arrival and became the birthplace of the worship of the deity Myōken Daibosatsu (妙見大菩薩). Under the patronage of the Ōuchi clan, it flourished as the home of the clan's guardian deity.

== Descendants ==
Prince Imseong became the progenitor of the Ōuchi clan took its name from the place name where they held power. The family possess a document of their descent in the Ōuchi family tree (Ō uchi Tatarashi fuch ō, 大内多々良氏譜牒).

On 17 April 2009, the 45th generation descendant, Ōuchi Kimio (大內公夫), visited Iksan, Korea to pay tribute to his Paekche ancestors buried at Ssangneung (Twin Tombs), believed to be the burial site of King Mu of Baekje and his wife, Queen Seonhwa.

In November, 657 there is a record stating that Imseong died when he was 81 years old.

=== Family Tree ===
- Note: Imseong probably came to Japan with his son Imryeong because of his age when he arrived and because his son has a Korean name.

琳聖太子 (Imseong Taeja; Japanese: Rinshō Taishi, founder of Ōuchi clan)[16][1]
 　┃
琳龍太子 (Imryeong Taeja; Japanese: Rinryu Taishi)[1]
 　┃
阿部太子 (Abe Taishi)[1]
 　┃
世農太子 (Atoyo Taishi)[1]
 　┃
世阿太子 (Azusa Taishi)[1]
 　┃
阿津太子 (Atsu Taishi)[1]
 　┃
大内正恒 (Ōuchi Masatsune)[1]

== See also ==
- Soga clan
- Ōuchi clan
- Toyoda clan
- Paekche
- Monarchs of Korea
