= Ōuchi-shi Yakata =

Castle ruins in Yamaguchi, Japan

- 大内氏館
- Yamaguchi Prefecture, Japan
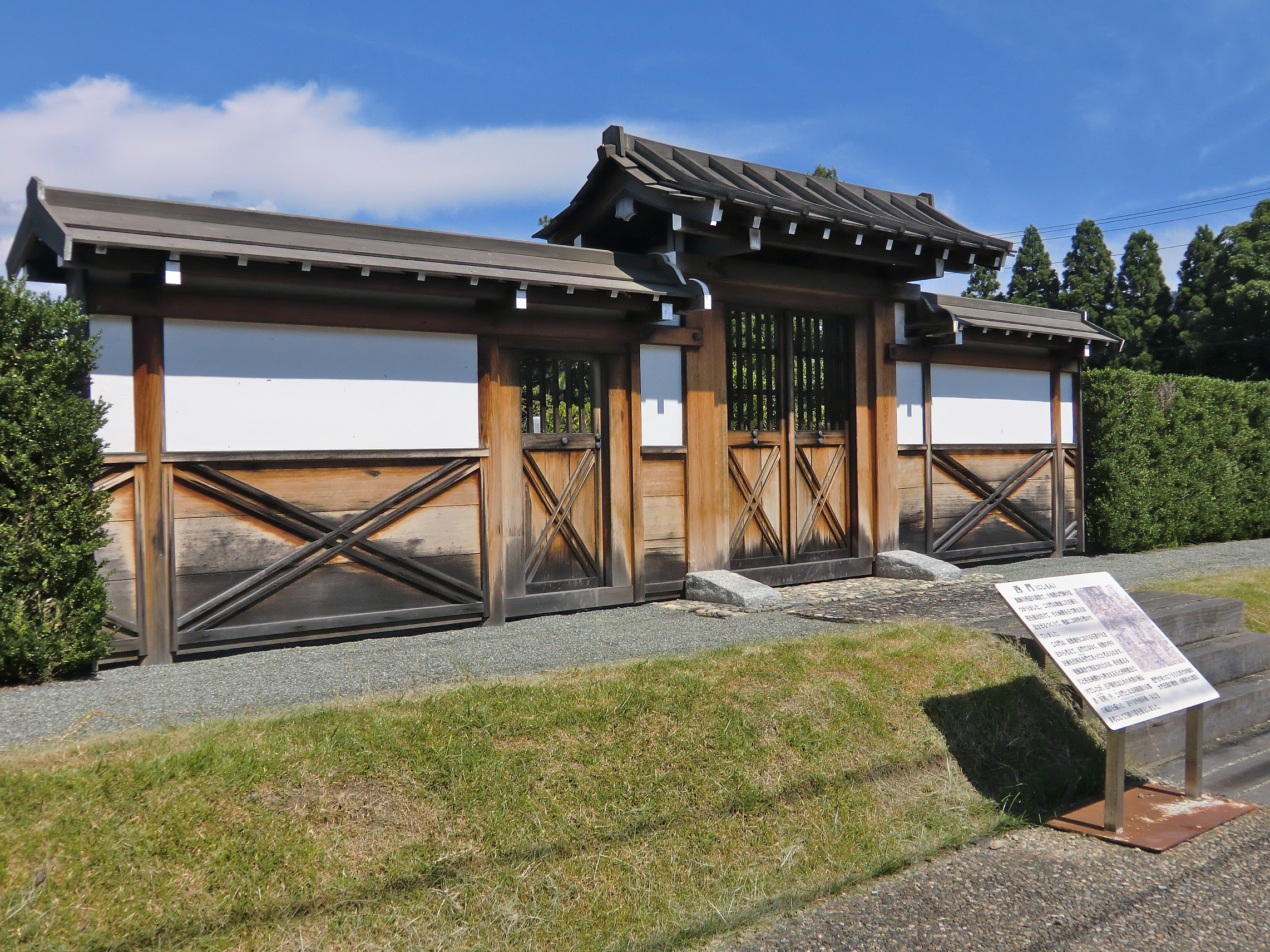
- Reconstructed west gate

Site information
- Type: Flatstyle castle
- Owner: Ōuchi clan
- Condition: ruins

Site history
- Built: 14C
- Built by: Ōuchi Hiroyo or Ōuchi Norihiro
- Demolished: 1557

Garrison information
- Past commanders: Ōuchi Yoshinaga

Ōuchi-shi Yakata (大内氏館, Ōuchi-shi Yakata) was the fortified residence of the Ōuchi clan in Yamaguchi, Japan. Ōuchi-shi Yakata has been designated as a National Historic Sites along with Ryōun-ji temple.

It was a base of the Ōuchi clan who were feudal lords and thrived during the Muromachi period to Sengoku period. Its ruins have been protected as a nationally designated historic site.

In 1556, Ōuchi Yoshinaga built Kōnomine Castle as a supporting castle of Ōuchi-shi Yakata because Ōuchi-shi Yakata was considered unsuitable for withstanding a siege. but Mōri Motonari`s army advanced to Suō Province, Ōuchi Yoshinaga left Ōuchi-shi Yakata and Kōnomine Castle without resistance.

The castle was listed as one of the Continued Top 100 Japanese Castles in 2017.

== Gallery ==
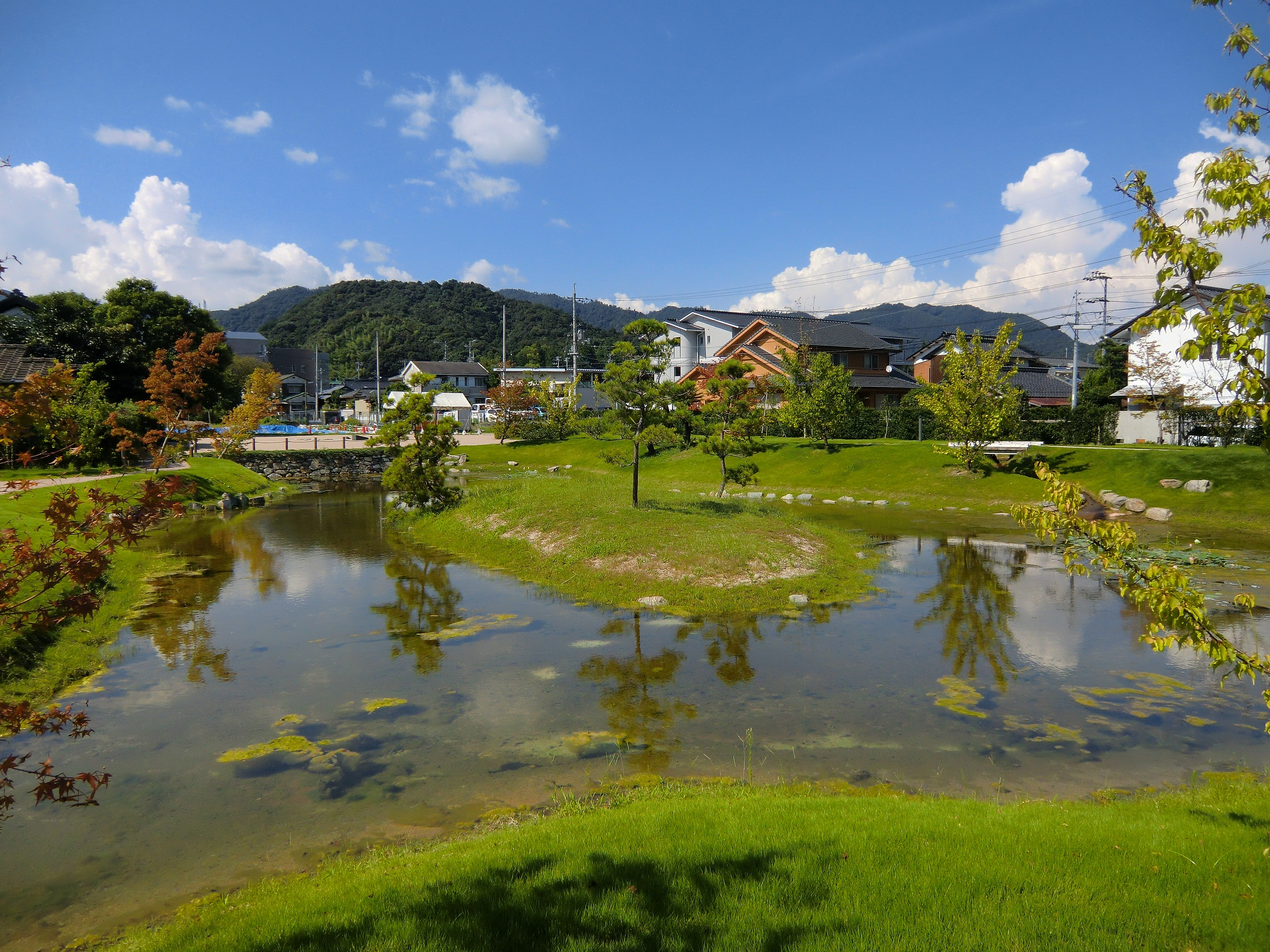
Reconstructed Garden

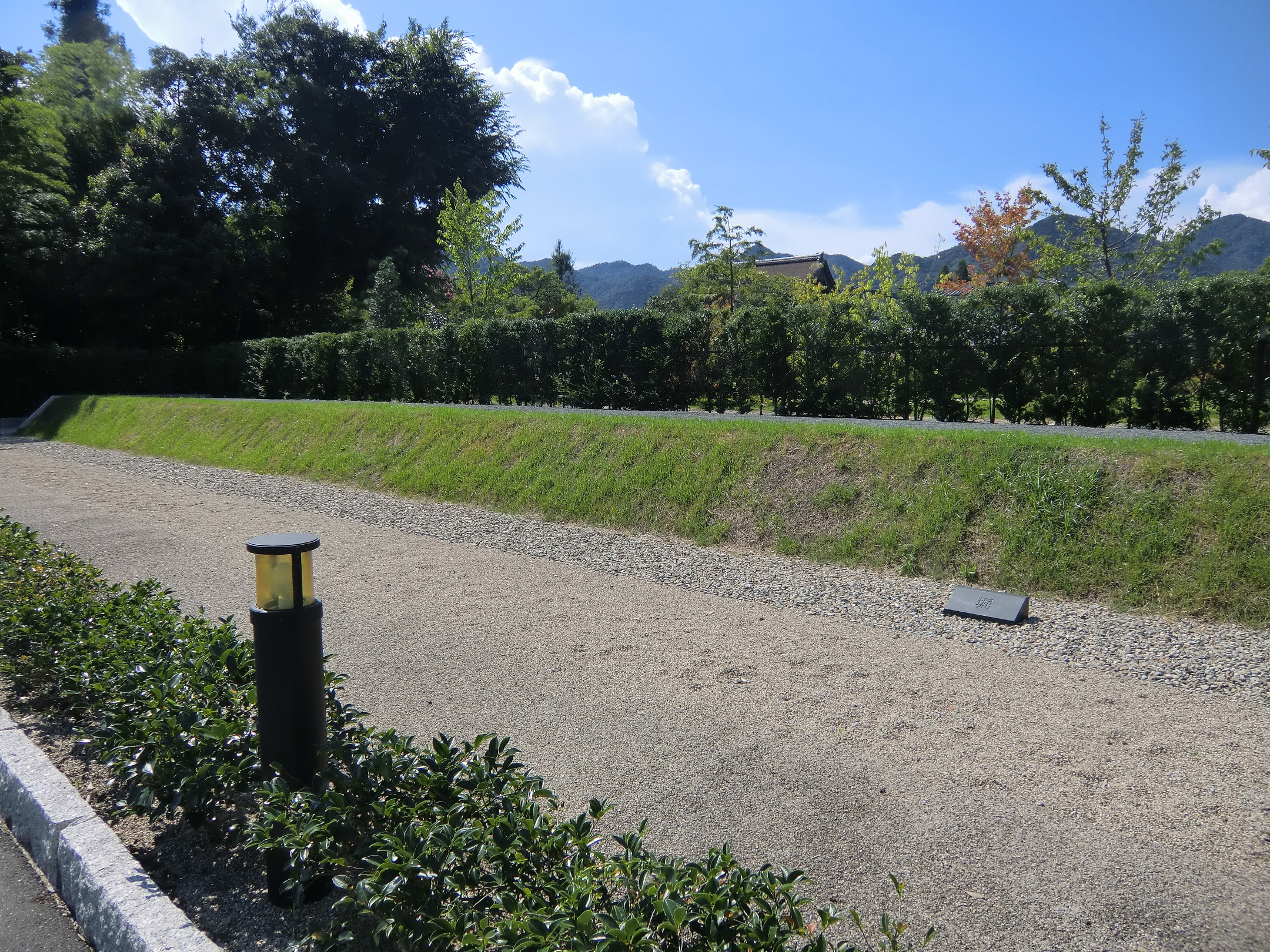
Restored moat and earthwork
