= Tokuyama Domain =

Administrative division in western Japan during the Edo period (1617-1871)

Tokuyama Domain (1650–1871) 徳山藩 Kudamatsu Domain (1617–1650) 下松藩
- Domain of Japan
- 1617–1871
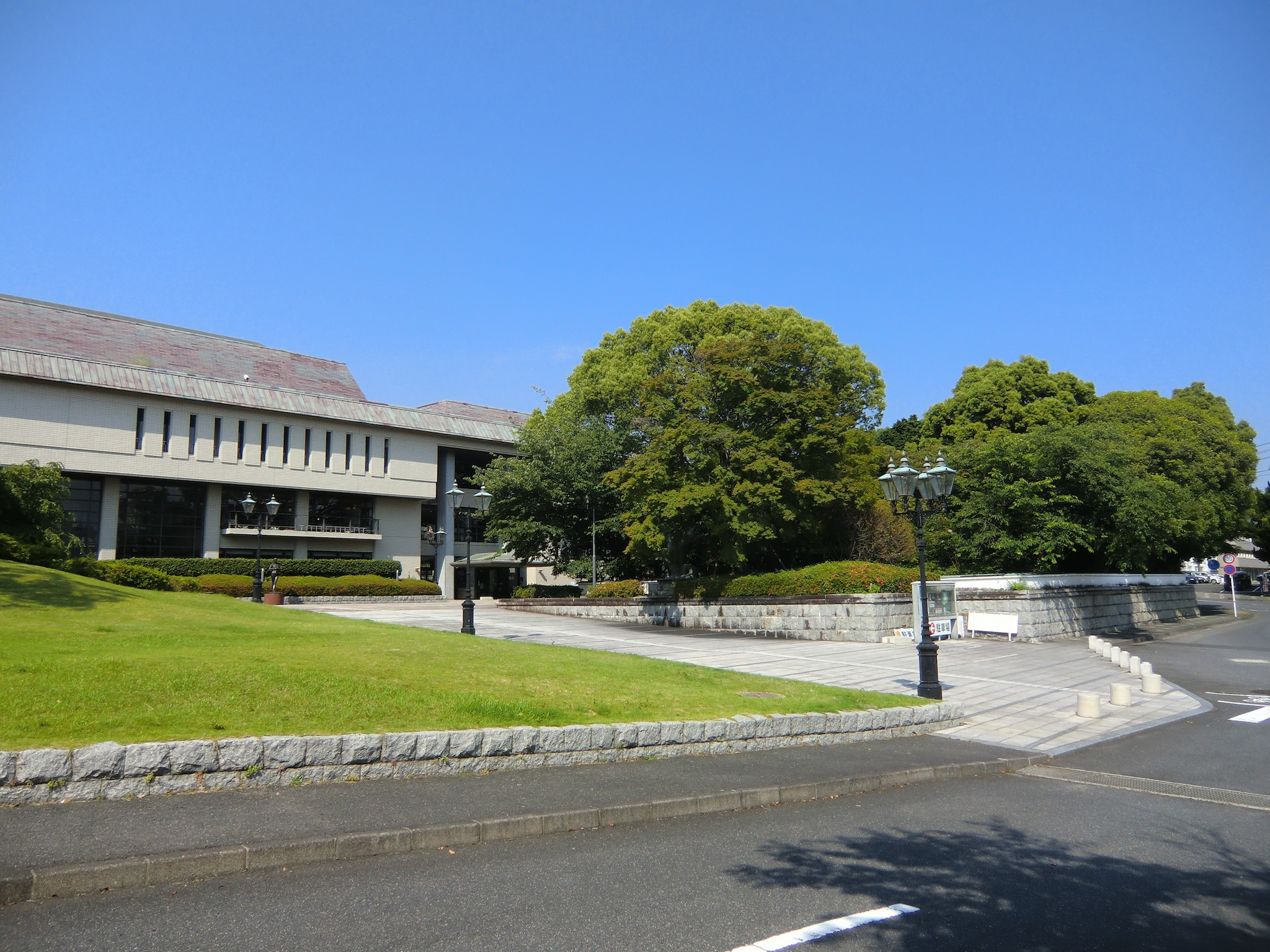
- site of Tokuyama Castle, now Shunan City Cultural Center

- Mon of the Mōri clan
- Capital: Kudamatsu jin'ya (1617–1650); Tokuyama jin'ya (1650–1871)
- Area
  - Coordinates: 34°03′41.3″N 131°48′47.7″E
- Historical era: Edo period
  - Established: 1617
  - Abolition of the han system: 1871
- Contained within
  - Province: Suō Province
- Today part of: Yamaguchi Prefecture

Location of Tokuyama Castle
Tokuyama Domain (Japan)

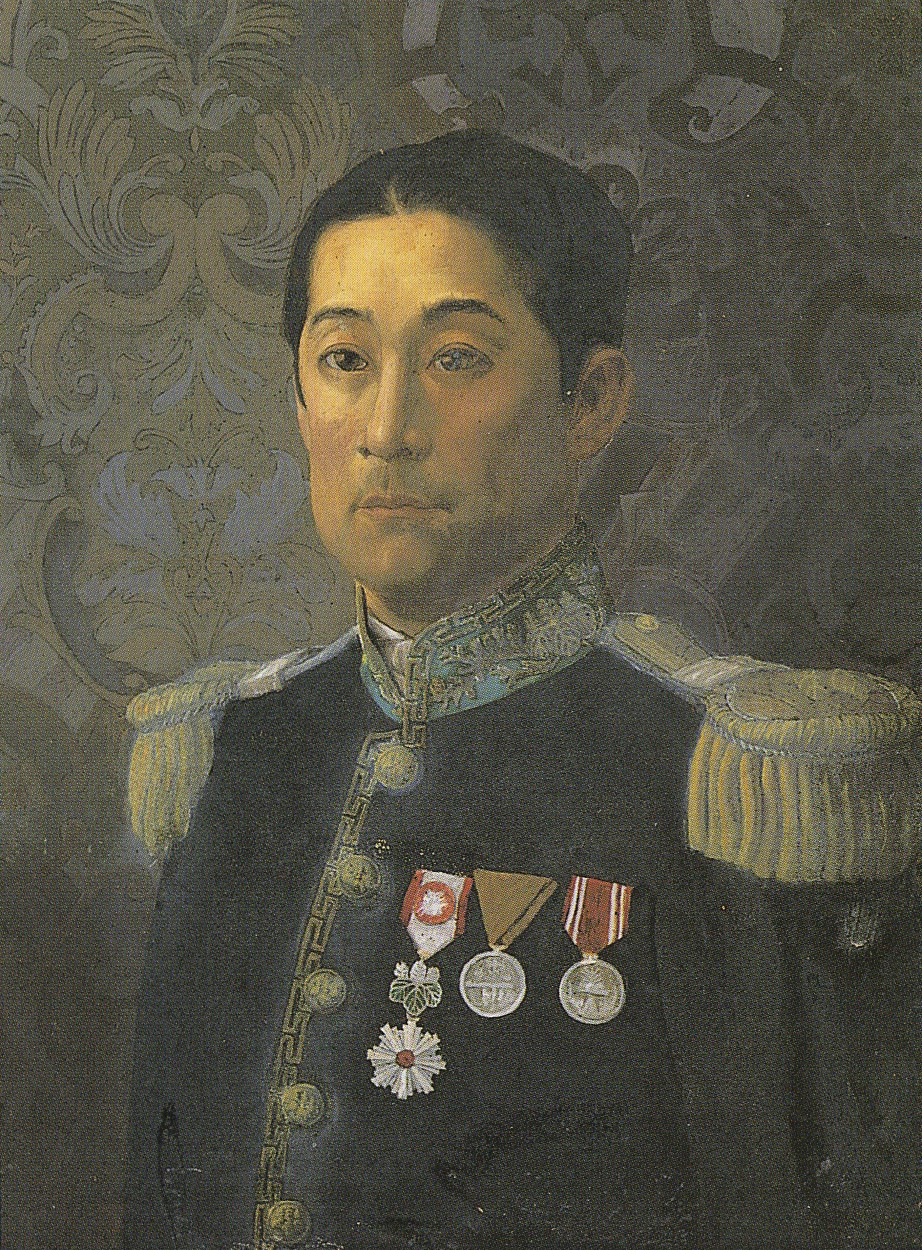
Viscount Mōri Motoisha, son of the last daimyo of Tokuyama

Tokuyama Domain (徳山藩, Tokuyama-han) was a feudal domain under the Tokugawa shogunate of Edo period Japan, in what is now southeastern Yamaguchi Prefecture. A subsidiary domain of Chōshū Domain, it was centered around Tokuyama jin'ya in what is now part of the city of Shūnan, Yamaguchi, and was ruled throughout its history by a cadet branch of the Mōri clan. Tokuyama Domain was dissolved in the abolition of the han system in 1871.

== History ==
=== As Kudamatsu Domain ===
Mōri Narikata, a son of Mōri Terumoto and brother of Mōri Hidenari was granted estates with a kokudaka of 31,000 koku and was authorized to establish a cadet branch of the Mōri clan. As his seat was initially located in Kudamatsu, Suō Province, the domain was initially referred to as "Kudamatsu Domain". In a land survey of 1625, it was estimated that his actual kokudaka was more than 40,000 koku. The domain received official recognition by the Tokugawa shogunate only in 1634. Mōri Narikata spent most of his time in Edo, visiting his estates only in 1634. For the most part, his holdings were administered by officials from the parent domain dispatched from Hagi; however, many of the domain's samurai were originally ronin made masterless by the Battle of Sekigahara, or else third sons of retainers of the parent domain who had poor prospects for employment closer to home.

=== As Tokuyama Domain ===
In June 1650, Mōri Narikata moved his seat to a place called Nogami, which he renamed "Tokuyama". The new location was more convenient for trade and commerce, and the domain was renamed "Tokuyama Domain". In 1716, under the third daimyō, Mōri Mototsugu, there was a heated dispute between Tokuyama Domain and the parent domain over the felling of trees (the Manyakuyama incident), which resulted in intervention of the shogunate and attainder of Tokuyama Domain for "disrespect". However, through the efforts of Mototsugu's son Mōri Mototaka and senior retainers, the domain was revived in 1719, albeit with a reduction in kokudaka to 30,000 koku. In 1836, the eighth daimyō, Mōri Hiroshige, was raised in status to "castle-holding daimyō", and Tokuyama jin'ya was renamed "Tokuyama Castle" and the domain's kokudaka reverted to 40,000 koku. His successor, Mōri Motomitsu, ruled to the Meiji restoration. At the time of the abolition of the han system in 1871, it was estimated that the domain's actual kokudaka was more than 69,000 koku.

On July 26, 1945, Tokuyama Castle was destroyed by the Tokuyama Air Raid.

== Holdings at the end of the Edo period ==
As with most domains in the han system, Tokuyama Domain consisted of several discontinuous territories calculated to provide the assigned kokudaka, based on periodic cadastral surveys and projected agricultural yields, g.

- Suō Province
  - 1 village in Kumage District
  - 26 villages in Tsuno District
  - 2 villages in Saba District
- Nagato Province
  - 2 villages in Abu District

== List of daimyō ==
#	Name	Tenure	Courtesy title	Court Rank	kokudaka
Mōri clan, 1617-1871 (Tozama)
1	Mōri Naritaka (毛利就隆)	1617 - 1679	Hyuga-no-kami (日向守)	Junior 5th Rank, Lower Grade (従五位下)	45,000 koku
2	Mōri Motokata (毛利元賢)	1679 - 1690	Hyuga-no-kami (日向守)	Junior 5th Rank, Lower Grade (従五位下)	45,000 koku
3	Mōri Mototsugu (毛利元次)	1690 - 1715	Hida-no-kami (飛騨守)	Junior 5th Rank, Lower Grade (従五位下)	45,000 koku
4	Mōri Mototaka (毛利元尭)	1715 - 1721	Hyuga-no-kami (日向守)	Junior 5th Rank, Lower Grade (従五位下)	45,000 -> 30,000 koku
5	Mōri Hirotoyo (毛利広豊)	1721 - 1758	Yamashiro-no-kami (山城守)	Junior 5th Rank, Lower Grade (従五位下)	30,000 koku
6	Mōri Hironori (毛利広寛)	1758 - 1764	Shima-no-kami (志摩守)	Junior 5th Rank, Lower Grade (従五位下)	30,000 koku
7	Mōri Nariyoshi (毛利就馴)	1764 - 1796	Iwami-no-kami (石見守)	Junior 5th Rank, Lower Grade (従五位下)	30,000 koku
8	Mōri Hiroshige (毛利広鎮)	1796 - 1837	Hyuga-no-kami (日向守)	Junior 5th Rank, Lower Grade (従五位下)	30,000 -> 40,000 koku
9	Mōri Motomitsu (吉川経賢)	1837 - 1871	Awaji-no-kami (淡路守)	Junior 5th Rank, Lower Grade (従五位下)	40,000 koku

== See also ==
- List of Han
- Abolition of the han system
