= Ōuchi Yoshihiro =

Ōuchi Yoshihiro (大内 義興, 1356–1400), also known as Ouchi Sakyo-no-Tayu, was a Muromachi period samurai clan head and military leader.

Yoshirio was the second son of Ōuchi Hiroyo, and a member of the Ōuchi clan which served under Ashikaga Takauji. The Ōuchi became known as the shugo of Suō and Nagato in 1363 for assisting the Ashikaga against many other opponents. Yoshihiro along with his father both also assisted Imagawa Sadayo in his Kyūshū campaign. After Yoshihiro's father died during the year of 1379, Yoshihiro and his brother both became involved in a power struggle. Yoshihiro ended up defeating his brother at Sakariyama in 1380. During the year of 1391, in the name of the shōgun, Ashikaga Yoshimitsu, Yoshihiro led an army against the Southern Court adherents in the Capital region. Due to Yoshihiro's actions, Yoshimitsu awarded him with two more provinces.

Yoshihiro's greatest contribution to the Ashikaga took place during the year of 1392, When Yoshihiro convinced the Southern Court Emperor to surrender, thus bringing to a close the Nanboku-chō period, also known as the Northern and Southern Courts period. Afterwards, the shogun told Yoshihiro to build him a villa at Kitayama. Yoshihiro thought this was an unreasonable demand. Due to this ironic fact, the Ōuchi revolted against the Bakufu. Yoshihiro was supported by many other Shugo, and withdrew his forces from Kyoto to the city of Sakai. The shogun, Yoshimitsu however wanted to solve the problem peacefully, but Yoshiro insisted on fighting. Due to this fact, the shogun made the first move. Yoshimitsu gathered the armies of Hatakeyama, Hosokawa, and the Shiba, and moved to the land of Sakai. Yoshihiro however made an agreement with some Inland Sea pirates to create a naval blockade against the enemy forces.

Yoshimitsu was then assisted by Ashikaga Mitsukane who promised that he would assist him. All was not going well for Yoshihiro due to his Iwami and Izumi troops proving to be unreliable. Due to this fact, Yoshihiro's army seemed generally stubborn and incompetent. During the 12th month of 1399 Bakufu troops managed to set fire to the city, and Yoshihiro ended up having to commit suicide to avoid the invading forces under Yoshimitsu. Apart from military actions, Yoshihiro was involved with trading between China and worked towards securing Ōuchi dominance in that area.

== See also ==
- Ōei Rebellion (応永の乱, Ōei no Ran)
