= Ōuchi Yoshitaka =

16th-century daimyo in Japan

- 大内 義隆
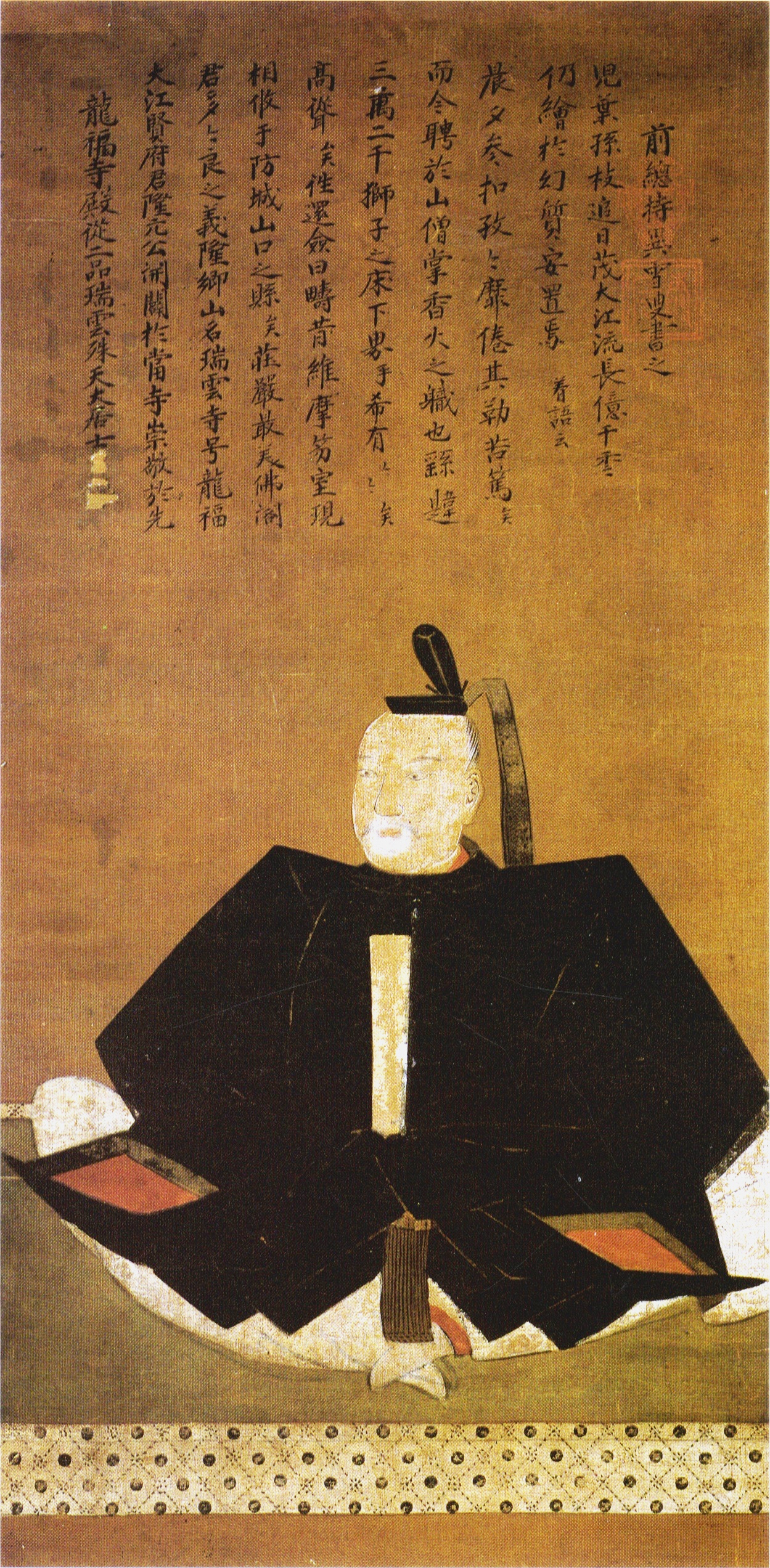

Shugo daimyō of Suō, Nagato, Iwami, Buzen, and Chikuzen provinces
- Preceded by: Ōuchi Yoshioki
- Succeeded by: Ōuchi Yoshinaga

Personal details
- Born: December 18, 1507 Yamaguchi, Japan
- Died: September 30, 1551 (aged 43) Tainei-ji Temple, Nagato, Japan

Ōuchi Yoshitaka (大内 義隆; December 18, 1507 – September 30, 1551) was the daimyō of Suō Province and the head of the Ōuchi clan, succeeding Ōuchi Yoshioki.

In 1522, he fought the Amago clan along with his father, Yoshioki, to win the control of Aki Province. Upon Yoshioki's death in 1528, Yoshitaka became the head of Ōuchi clan. In the 1530s, he led military actions in the northern Kyūshū, defeating Shōni clan to win control of the area. With his back then secure, in 1540 he again started combating the Amago clan and by 1541, managed to gain complete control the Aki province.

However, in 1542, an invasion into Izumo Province ended in a disaster, with Yoshitaka losing his adopted son Ōuchi Harumochi along with a large number of troops against Amago Haruhisa. His 1542–43 Siege of Toda Castle ended in failure. He completely lost his ambitions of expanding his domains and devoted his energy to the arts and culture. His retainers split into two factions. Those led by Sagara Taketō wanted the Ōuchi clan to simply do nothing more than maintain the control of their current domains, while those led by Sue Harukata wanted to continue expanding. Yoshitaka sided with the former.

Under the patronage of Yoshitaka, foreign trade and the arts flourished, and the Ōuchi home city Yamaguchi prospered greatly. In addition, Yoshitaka also attracted the Spanish missionary Francis Xavier, and allowed him to proselytize while he was in Yamaguchi. At the same time, Yoshitaka fostered a close relationship with Emperor Go-Nara in Kyoto, and sponsored many imperial rites that the imperial court could not have afforded otherwise. On March 27, 1551, the embattled emperor appointed Ōuchi Yoshitaka as Acting Governor of Yamashiro (山城権守), the home province where the imperial capital Kyoto was located, in a bid to leverage the Ōuchi against the ravages of the warlord Miyoshi Nagayoshi, who occupied the capital. Yoshitaka, as Acting Governor of Yamashiro and, by extension, the protector of the court, embarked on a daring plan to relocate the emperor and the court to Yamaguchi. High-ranking courtiers and performers of imperial rites moved to Yamaguchi, including dignitaries such as former regent (kampaku) Nijō Tadafusa and retired Grand Minister (Sadaijin) Sanjō Kin'yori (三条公頼; father-in-law of Takeda Shingen). By the end of the eighth month of 1551, nearly the whole court, save for the emperor himself and the palace ladies, was in Yamaguchi.

The military establishment of the Ōuchi resented Yoshitaka's apparent "weakness" and his plan to settle the imperial court in Yamaguchi — such a move would see privileges accorded to the courtiers and undermine their own standing within the Ōuchi clan. In September 1551, the faction led by Sue Harukata revolted and attempted to take over the Ōuchi clan. With the control of troops in Harukata's hand, it was over in few days—the courtiers and ministers were massacred and Yoshitaka was forced to perform seppuku at the Tainei-ji Temple (大寧寺) in Nagato Province after composing his death poem:

Both the victor
and the vanquished are
but drops of dew,
but bolts of lightning –
thus should we view the world.
