= Nijō Tadafusa =

Japanese noble

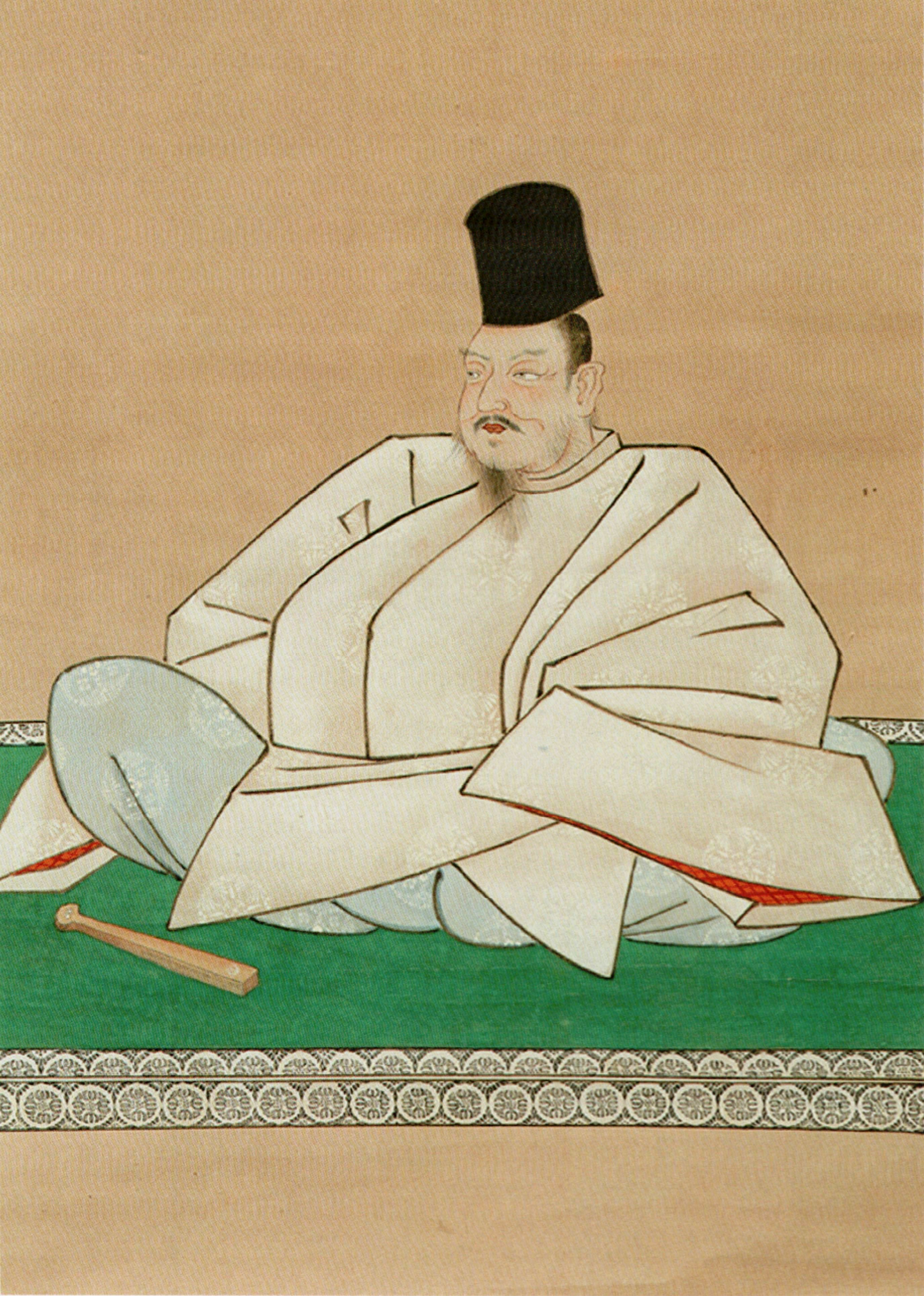
Nijō Tadafusa

Nijō Tadafusa (二条 尹房; November 16, 1496 – September 29, 1551), son of regent Nijō Hisamoto, was a Japanese kugyō (court noble) of the Muromachi period (1336–1573). He held a regent position kampaku two times from 1518 to 1525 and from 1534 to 1536. His wife was a daughter of regent Kujō Hisatsune who gave birth to Nijō Haruyoshi. He was killed in the Tainei-ji incident of 1551.
