= Ōuchi clan =

Japanese clan. famous as powerful daimyo of Muromachi period

Ōuchi 大内
- The emblem (mon) of the Ōuchi clan
- Home province: Suō
- Parent house: Paekche royalty (disputed); Tatara clan
- Titles: Various
- Founder: Ōuchi Morifusa (大内盛房)
- Final ruler: Ōuchi Yoshinaga
- Founding year: 12th century
- Dissolution: 1557
- Ruled until: 1557, Ōuchi Yoshinaga commits seppuku
- Cadet branches: Migitashi clan (parent clan of the Sue clan); Yamaguchi clan (Chūgoku); Yamaguchi clan (Owari); etc

Ōuchi clan (大内氏, Ōuchi-shi) was one of the most powerful and important families in Western Japan during the reign of the Ashikaga shogunate in the 14th to 16th centuries. Their domains, ruled from the castle town of Yamaguchi in the western tip of Honshu island, comprised six provinces at their height, and the Ōuchi played a major role in supporting the Ashikaga in the Nanboku-cho Wars against the Southern Imperial Court. The Ōuchi remained powerful up until the 1550s, when they were eclipsed by their former vassals, the Mōri clan.

== Origin ==
The genealogical record specifies that the Ōuchi clan were descended from a prince of the royal house of Paekche, who immigrated to Japan in the 7th century. According to the Ōuchi Tatarashi fuchō and the Ōuchi-shi Jitsruroku, Prince Imseong is their first ancestor.

In modern times, books such as the Ōuchi-shi Jitsruroku (大内氏実録), a work of the historian Kondō Kiyoshi (近藤清石, 1833–1916), adopted this narrative. However recently, some scholars dispute this circumstance and point to traditions that might seem contradictory to each other. Despite the scrutiny, modern day members of the Ōuchi clan state that there is no dispute, and that they strongly identify with Paekche (Korea).

In other instances, the clan is believed to have descended from the Tatara clan, a Toraijin clan that arrived from the Kaya confederacy during the Kofun period according to the Shinsen Shōjiroku. Some scholars suspect that the inclusion of this claim hints at a possible Kaya-related root rather than Paekche and may possibly be the reason why the clan had a close kinship with the Sue clan (the clan of Sue Harukata), another family with Tatara roots which ultimately became Ōuchi's downfall. However, a consensus is yet to be reached with the only concrete evidence alluding to a Korean origin.

The clan is also heavily related to the Toyoda/Toyota clan, known for the famous car manufacturer, the Toyota Group. According to the official Toyota Family Genealogy (豊田家系譜; とよたけいふ; Toyotakeifu), the clan descends from Prince Imseong who in turn was a descendant of King Dongmyeong of Goguryeo. This makes the Toyota clan a relative family to the Tatara clan, as well as its cadet branch, the Ōuchi clan.

== History ==
Based in Suō Province, towards the western end of Honshū, the Ōuchi were among the primary families to be involved in foreign trade and relations, particularly with the Joseon dynasty of Korea, and Ming dynasty of China.

Historically the Ōuchi clan emphasized their Korean heritage along with their Japanese identity to establish economic power based on international trade and wield political power. According to Korean records, the clan was officially called the "Daenae clan (大内氏; 대내씨)" and called the head of the clan "Daenaejeon (大內殿; 대내전)", a direct translation of "Ōuchi-tono (大内殿; おおうちとの)" meaning "Lord Ōuchi", using the pronunciation of the clan's Chinese characters, and was treated as a Korean diaspora to the Joseon government. To secure its influence over Korea, the Ōuchi clan fought with other neighboring clans in the region of Chūgoku and Kyushu, such as the Sō clan of Tsushima, who themselves were also of Korean descent (through the Koremune clan and thus the Hata clan) and sought to become the sole trading partner with Joseon. In the 15th century, the Ōuchi clan was able to remove the Sō clan from Kyushu and become an integral trading partner with Korea.

The clan is thought to have utilized its heritage as a leverage to request lands and treasures from Korea at the time. According to the Veritable Records of the Joseon Dynasty, there were hundreds of official visits from the clan to Korea. In one instance, Ōuchi Yoshihiro officially requested the Joseon government to certify the clan's genealogy in order to verify if they were indeed of Prince Imseong descent in 1399. The request came with the rights for a fief within the lands of Korea. According to the records, the request span from the reigns of King Jeongjong to King Danjong, where the latter almost considered it much to the outcry from his imperial court. Due to multiple rejections, the request for a fief was later curtailed to simply "adding the Ōuchi name into the genealogy" which was granted. In another instance, the clan requested the Tripitaka Koreana, the oldest intact version of Buddhist canon in Chinese characters in history, under the assumption that Korea was no longer a Buddhist nation due to its "Anti-Buddhist policy" or "Eokbul Jeongchaek (抑佛政策)" and pro-Confucianist ideology. The Tripitaka was considered as a sacred relic of Buddhism to Japan which unlike Joseon, was still a Buddhist nation, and most likely provided religious dominance if such items were possessed by a Japanese clan. It is believed that the Ōuchi tried obtaining the scriptures by using their heritage as a leverage. King Sejong, someone who was a heavy believer in Confucianism, considered granting the request due to his lack of interest in Buddhism and the never-ending demand from the clan, but was again met with the outcry from his court and ultimately declined. Instead, the government provided books that were created from the Tripitaka (which contained 52,330,152 characters in total) to give as gifts to envoys who sought knowledge from the Tripitaka itself.

The clan sought for trade with China as well. Following the Ōnin War (1467–1477), a strong rivalry developed between the Ōuchi and the Hosokawa family, who were then in power. The two clashed at Ningbo in 1523, and as a result the Chinese closed Ningbo to Japanese traders. After the incident, the Ōuchi ships were only allowed to trade in China in 1540 and 1549. The Ōuchi also housed the Portuguese Jesuit missionary Francis Xavier for a time in 1551. As a result of their wealth and trading contacts, the Ōuchi gained renown in the worlds of art and culture as well. They possessed countless items of cultural and artistic significance and beauty, from Japan and China, as well as from further abroad. Particularly famous was the invitation by Ōuchi Masahiro of the famous painter Sesshū to Yamaguchi in 1486.

In 1551, the daimyō Ōuchi Yoshitaka tried to move Emperor Go-Nara and his court from war-torn Kyoto to Yamaguchi. But the Ōuchi's chief military vassals opposed this plan, fearing that imperial courtiers would displace them. This led to the Tainei-ji incident, in which Yoshitaka was forced to commit suicide. Sue Harukata of the Sue clan (a lateral branch of the Ōuchi clan), also the leader of the rebellion, installed Ōuchi Yoshinaga as a puppet clan chief. Despite being the newly appointed head of the Ōuchi clan, Yoshinaga was actually the younger brother of long-time Ōuchi rival Ōtomo Sōrin. This ended the Ōuchi line proper.

In 1555, Mōri Motonari, another former vassal of Yoshitaka, defeated Sue Harukata in the Battle of Miyajima. Two years later, Yoshinaga committed suicide, ending the Ōuchi clan.

== Clan heads ==
1. Ōuchi Morifusa (大内盛房)
2. Ōuchi Hiromori (大内弘盛)
3. Ōuchi Mitsumori (大内満盛)
4. Ōuchi Hironari (大内弘成, ? –1244)
5. Ōuchi Hirosada (大内弘貞, ? –1286)
6. Ōuchi Hiroie (大内弘家, 1274?–1300)
7. Ōuchi Shigehiro (大内重弘, ? –1320)
8. Ōuchi Hiroyuki (大内弘幸, ? –1352)
9. Ōuchi Hiroyo (大内弘世, 1325–1380)
10. Ōuchi Yoshihiro (大内義弘, 1356–1400) – Led a revolt against Shogun Ashikaga Yoshimitsu.
11. Ōuchi Moriakira (大内盛見, 1377–1431)
12. Ōuchi Mochiyo (大内持世, 1394–1441)
13. Ōuchi Norihiro (大内教弘, 1420–1465)
14. Ōuchi Masahiro (大内政弘, 1446–1495) – one of Yamana Sōzen's chief generals in the Ōnin War.
15. Ōuchi Yoshioki (大内義興, 1477–1529) – Restored the shogun Ashikaga Yoshitane to power after a fifteen-year absence in 1508.
16. Ōuchi Yoshitaka (大内義隆, 1507–1551) – The lord who oversaw the height of Ōuchi power and saw it end abruptly.
17. Ōuchi Yoshinaga (大内義長, 1532?–1557) – The last Ōuchi lord, he was the son of Sengoku daimyō, Ōtomo Yoshiaki, and thus not of Ōuchi blood.

== Notable retainers ==
- Sue Harukata
- Sue Nagafusa
- Hironaka Takakane
- Iida Okihide

== Prominent castles ==
- Ōuchi-shi Yakata : Ōuchi clan's main bastion
- Kōnomine Castle : Supporting castle of Ōuchi-shi Yakata
- Wakayama Castle : Sue clan's main bastion
- Katsuyama Castle
- Tsuwano Castle
- Tsuchiyama Castle

== See also ==
- Toraijin
- Tatara clan
- Toyoda clan
- Sue clan
- Mōri clan
