= Ōuchi Yoshinaga =

16th-century Japanese Kyushu warrior

Ōuchi Yoshinaga

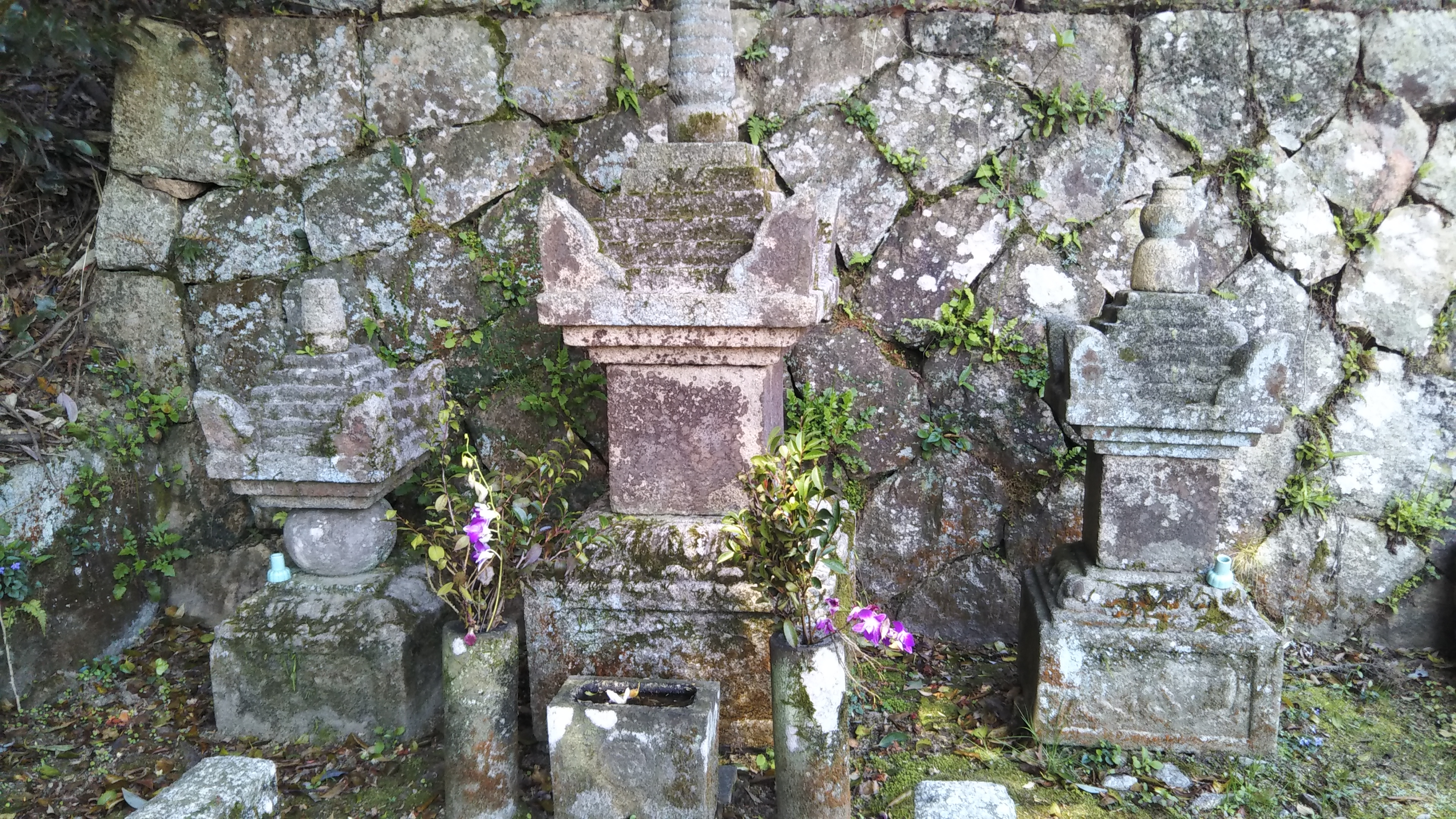
Yoshinaga's grave in Kozanji-temple

Ōuchi Yoshinaga (大内 義長; 1532 – 1 May 1557), formerly Ōtomo Haruhide (大友 晴英), was a 16th-century Kyushu warrior who was invited by Sue Harukata, who had just taken control of the Ōuchi clan, to serve as the official head of the Ōuchi while Sue pulled the strings from behind. Yoshinaga was the younger brother of Ōtomo Sōrin.

Following Mōri Motonari's victory over Sue in 1555 at Miyajima, Yoshinaga's position became quite vulnerable. Yoshinaga was forced to kill himself at Chōfukuji Temple in 1557, effectively causing the Ōuchi clan to become extinct.
