= Suō Province =

Historical province in Japan

Coordinates: 34°03′28″N 131°35′11″E

Map of Japanese provinces (1868) with Suō Province highlighted

Suō Province (周防国, Suō no Kuni; Japanese pronunciation: [sɨ́.ò̞ò̞ (nò̞ kɯ̈̀.ɲ̟ì)]) was a province of ancient Japan in the area that is today the eastern part of Yamaguchi Prefecture. Suō bordered on Aki, Iwami, and Nagato Provinces.

Its abbreviated form name was Bōshū (防州). In terms of the Gokishichidō system, Suō was one of the provinces of the San'yōdō circuit. Under the Engishiki classification system, Suō was ranked as one of the "superior countries" (上国) in terms of importance, and one of the "far countries" (遠国) in terms of distance from the imperial capital, Kyoto. The provincial capital was located in what is now the city of Hōfu, Yamaguchi. The ichinomiya of the province is the Tamanooya Shrine also located in Hōfu.

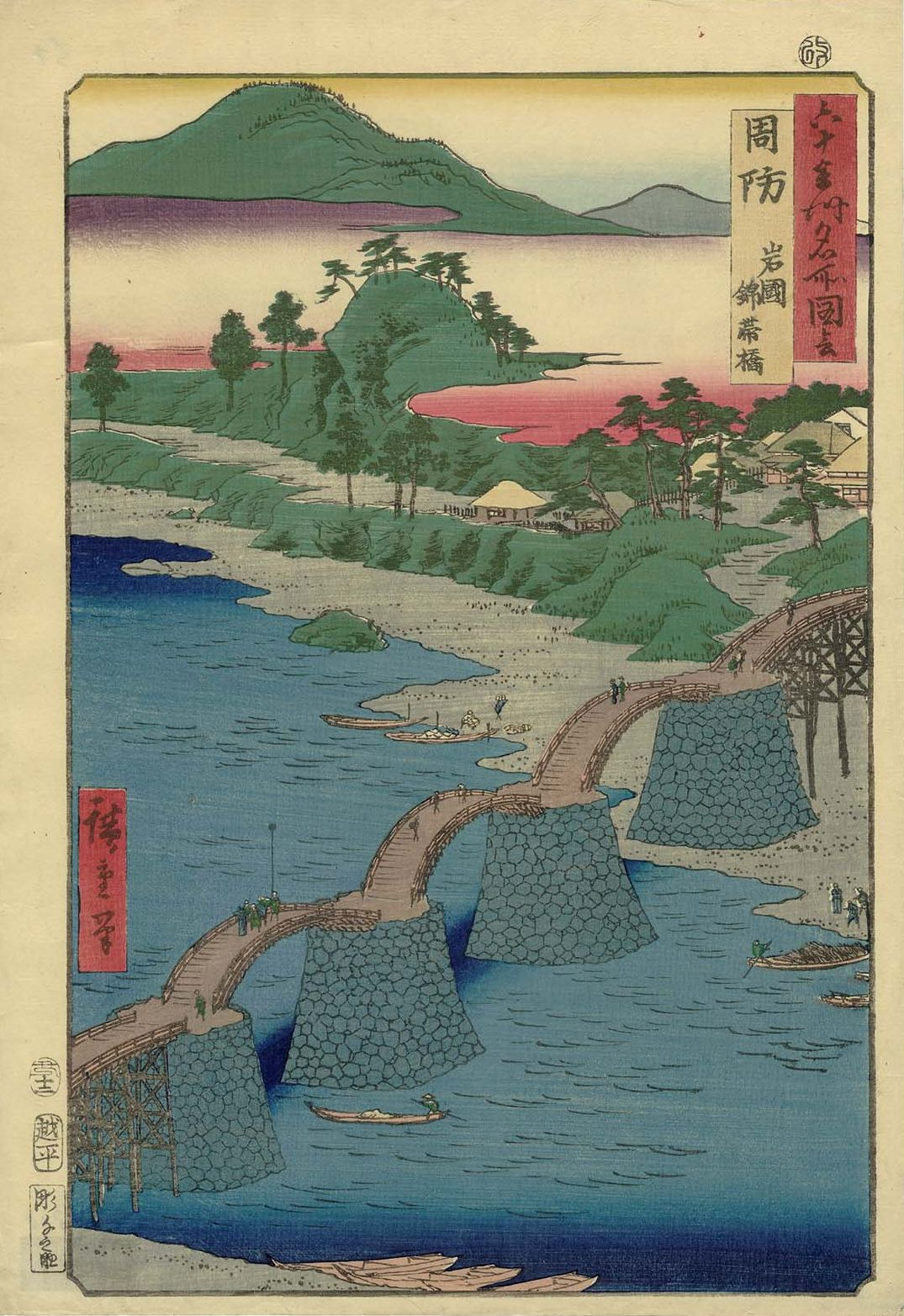
Hiroshige ukiyo-e "Suo" in "The Famous Scenes of the Sixty States" (六十余州名所図会), depicting the Kintai Bridge

== History ==
Before the establishment of the Ritsuryō system, the area of Suō was under control of various semi-independent kuni no miyatsuko: Ōshima Kuni (Suō-Ōshima), Suō Kuni (Kumage County, Kuga County), Hakuki Kuni (Kishiki County), Tsunu Kuni (Tono County), and Sawa Kuni (Sawa County) . These were united to form the Ritsuryo province, which initially consisted of five counties: Oshima, Kumage, Tsuno, Sawa, and Kisiki. Kuga County was divided from Kumage in 721 to form the sixth counties. In the Asuka period, the Iwakisan Kōgoishi mountain fortification was constructed against a possible invasion by Tang dynasty China and the Kingdom of Silla in Korean peninsula. Wooden tally strips bearing the name of 'Suho Province', 'Shuyō Province' and 'Suō Province' have been found at the ruins of Fujiwara-kyō and Heijō-kyō and the names were used interchangeably in Nara period records, such as the Nihon Shoki.

During the Kamakura period, the ruling Hōjō clan were the shugo of the province, and were replaced in the Muromachi period by the Ōuchi clan. During the Sengoku period, the Mōri clan supplanted the Ōuchi, and the province became part of the holdings of Chōshū Domain in the Edo Period. Following the Meiji restoration, the province became part of Yamaguchi Prefecture. The area of former Suo Province is now divided between the cities of Hōfu, Kudamatsu, Iwakuni, Hikari, Yanai, Shūnan, Ōshima District, Kuga District, Kumage District, and most of Yamaguchi city (excluding the former Ato Town), and a portion of Ube.

Bakumatsu period domains
Name	Clan	Type	kokudaka
Chōshū	Mōri clan	Tozama	369,000 koku
Tokuyama	Mōri clan	Tozama	40,000 koku
Iwakuni	Kikkawa clan	Tozama	60,000 koku

== Meiji period ==
Following the Meiji restoration, Suō was divided into six districts. Per the early Meiji period Kyudaka kyuryo Torishirabe-chō (旧高旧領取調帳), an official government assessment of the nation’s resources, the province had 295 villages with a total kokudaka of 548,861 koku.

Districts of Suō Province
District	kokudaka	Controlled by	at present	Currently
Ōshima (大島郡)	35,446 koku	21 villages: Chōshū, Iwakuni		Suō-Ōshima
Kuga (玖珂郡)	119,966 koku	112 villages: Chōshū, Iwakuni		Iwakuni, Waki
Kumage (熊毛郡)	87,846 koku	39 villages: Chōshū, Tokuyama		Hikari, Kaminoseki, Tabuse, Hirano, parts of Shūnan, Yanai
Tsuno (都濃郡)	103,817 koku	47 villages: Chōshū, Tokuyama	dissolved	Kudamatsu, most of Shūnan
Saba (佐波郡)	90,192 koku	41 villages: Chōshū, Tokuyama	dissolved	most of Hofu, part of Yamaguchi, Shūnan
Yoshiki (吉敷郡)	111,591 koku	35 villages: Chōshū	dissolved	most of Yamaguchi, part of Hōfu, Ube

== Gallery ==
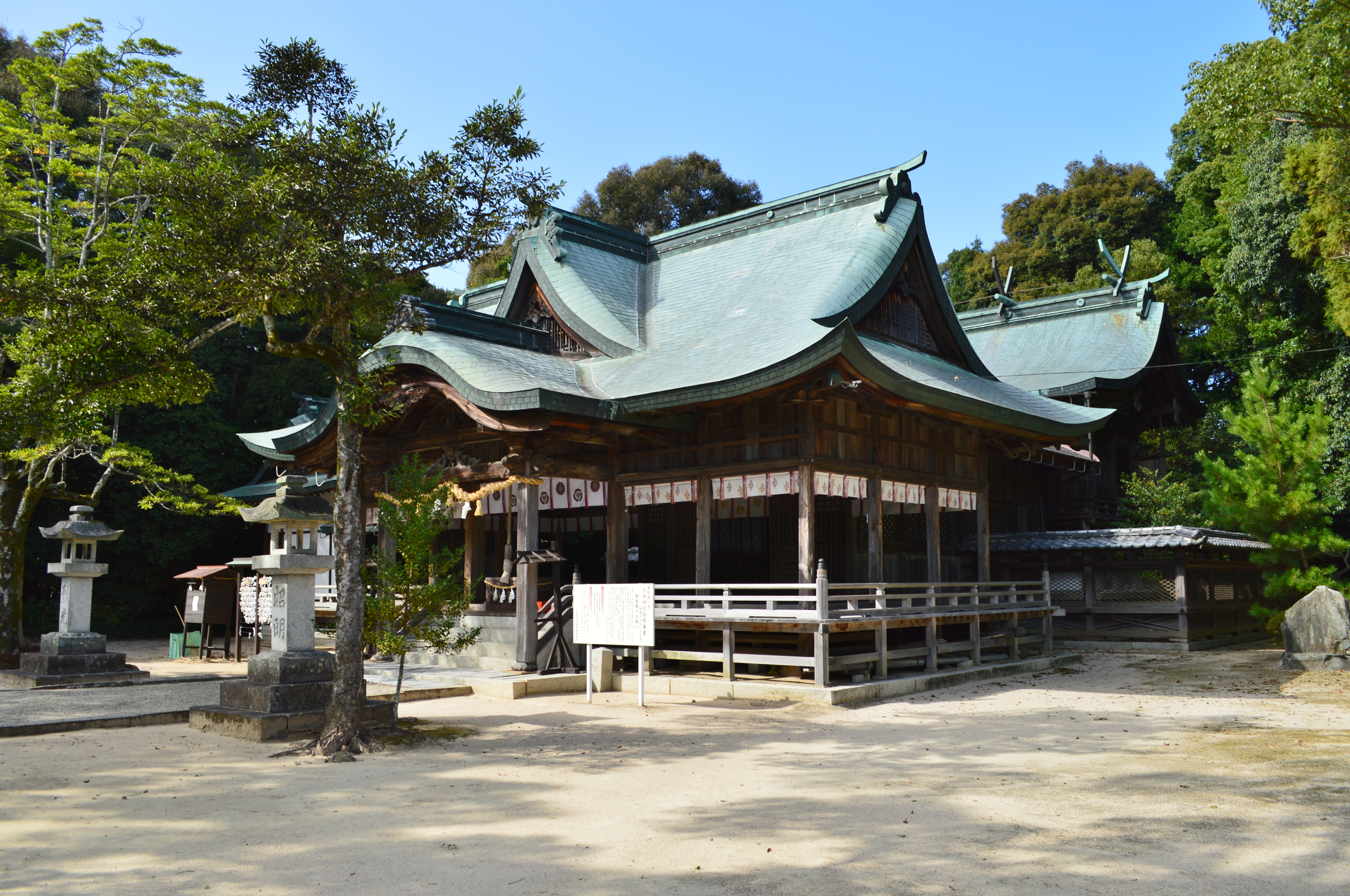
Tamanooya Shrine, ichinomiya of the province

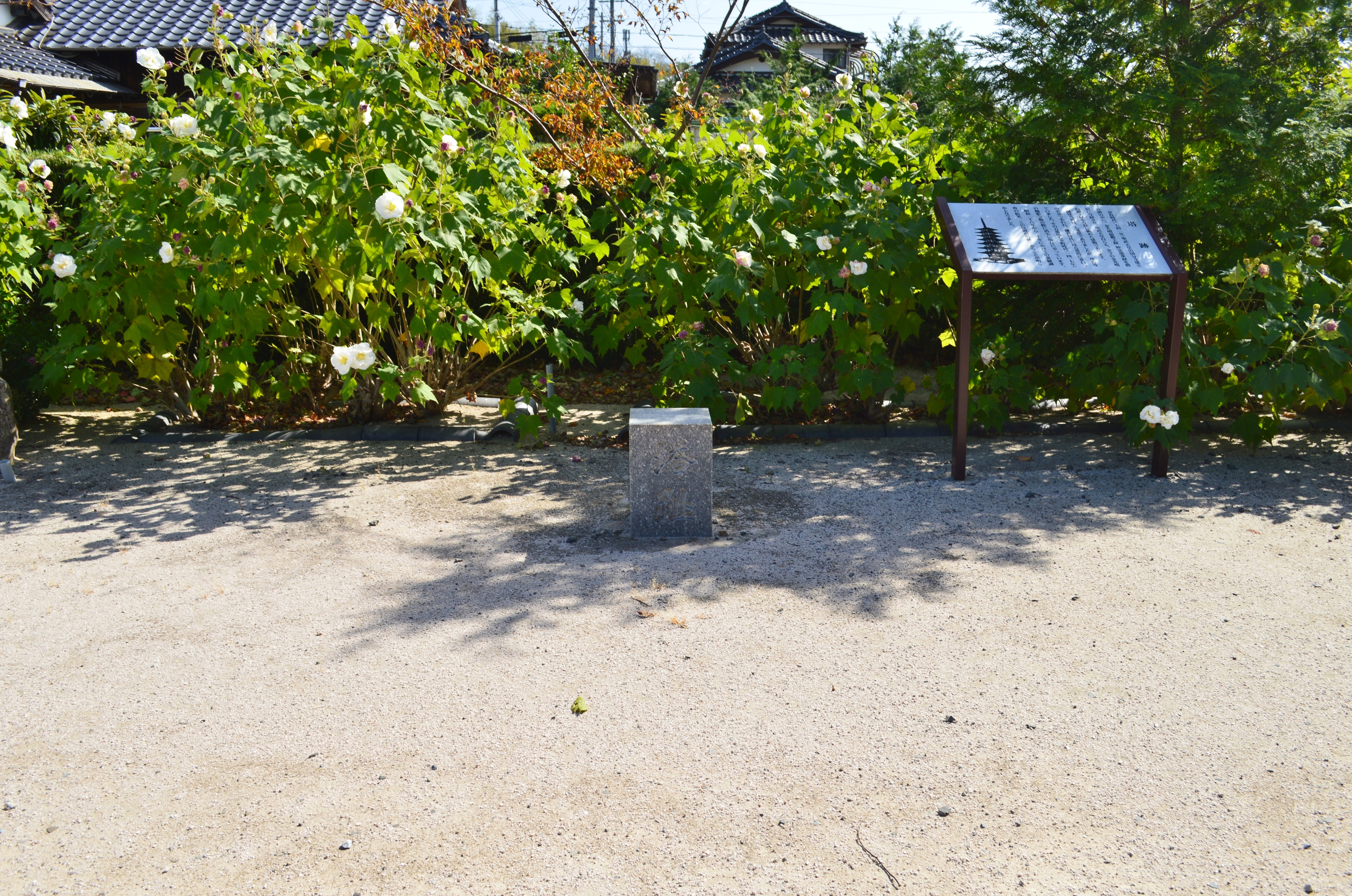
Ruins of Suo Kokubun-ji

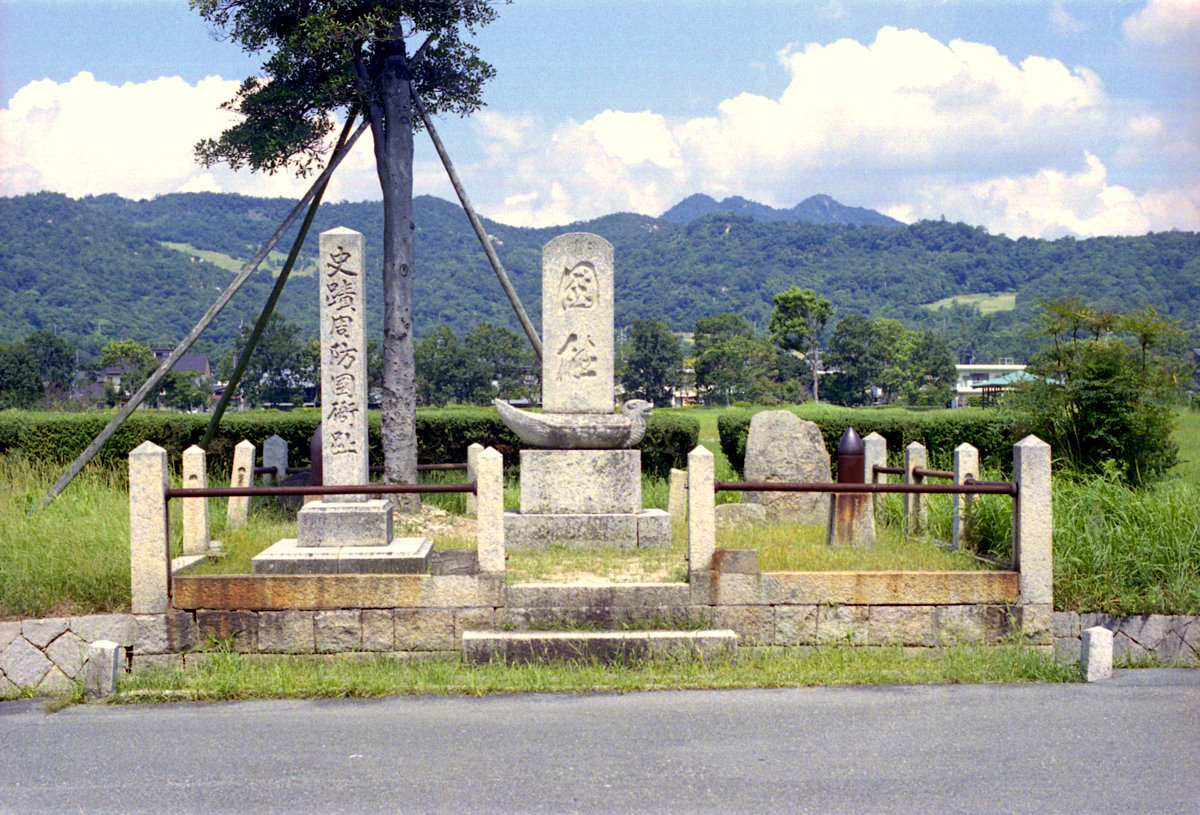
Ruins of Suo Kokuga

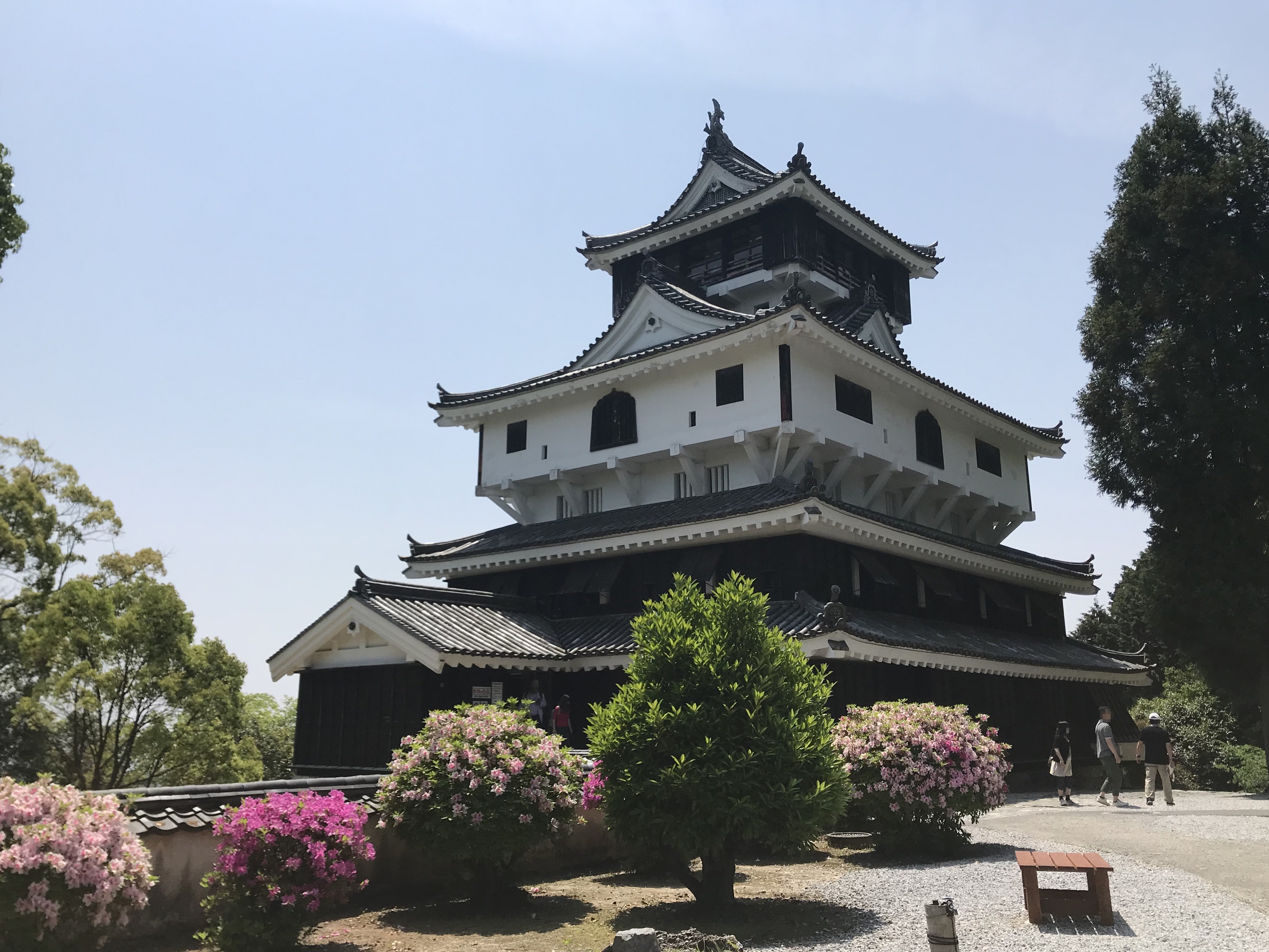
Iwakuni Castle

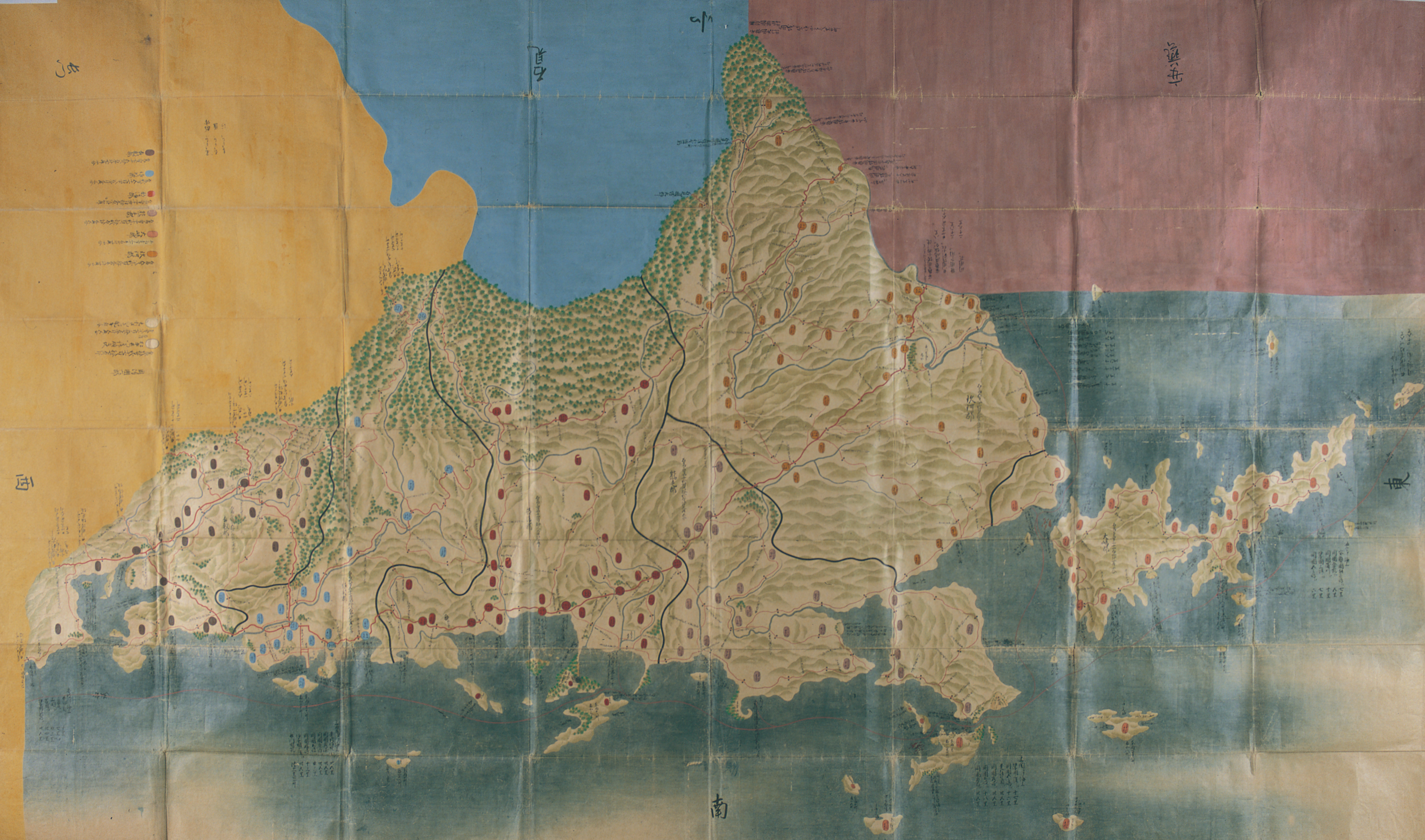
Shōhō Kuniezu - Suō Province, with Nagato in yellow, Iwami in blue, and Aki in pink (Yamaguchi Prefectural Archives)

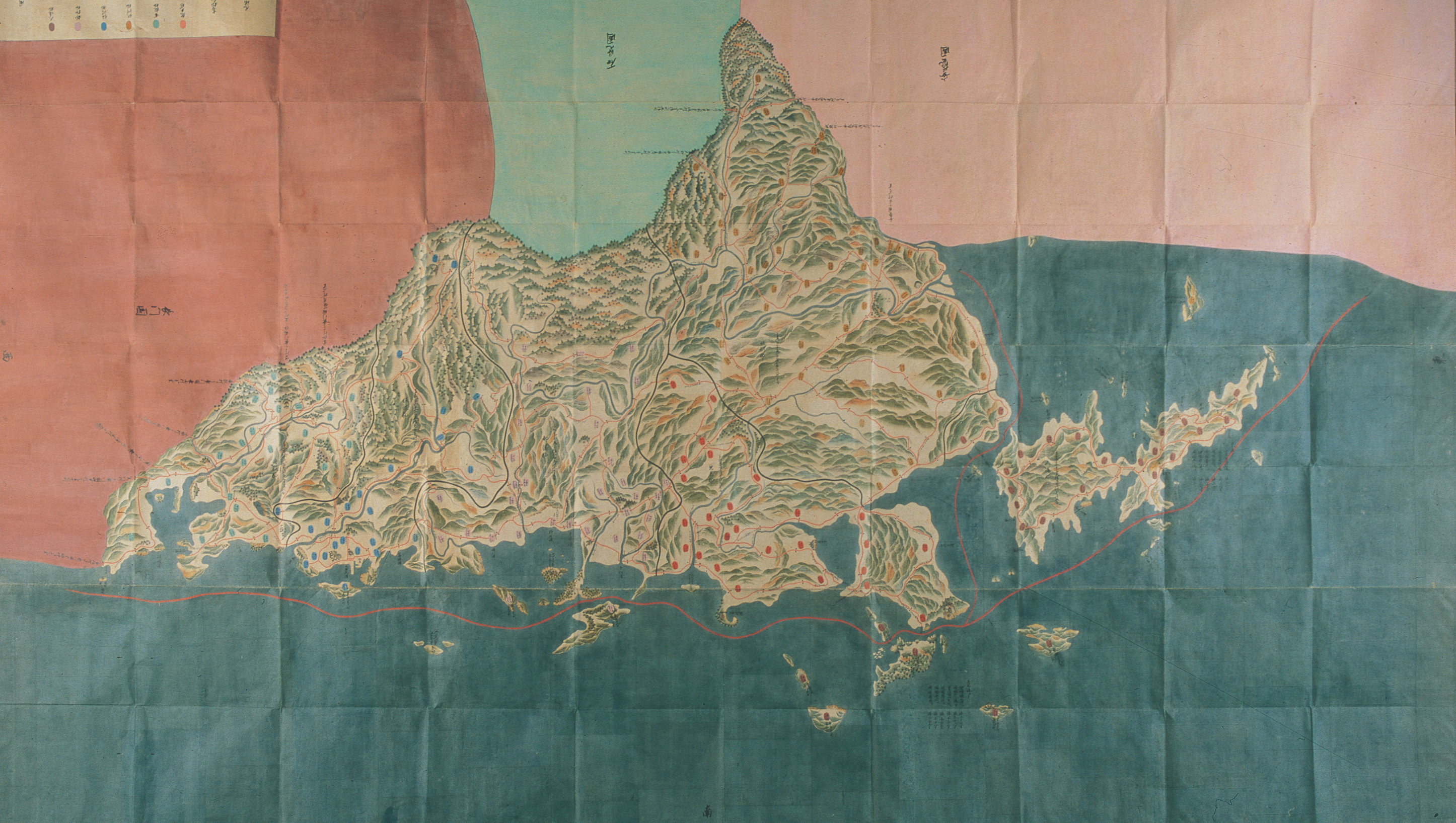
Genroku Kuniezu - Suō Province, with Nagato in red, Iwami in green, and Aki in pink (Yamaguchi Prefectural Archives)

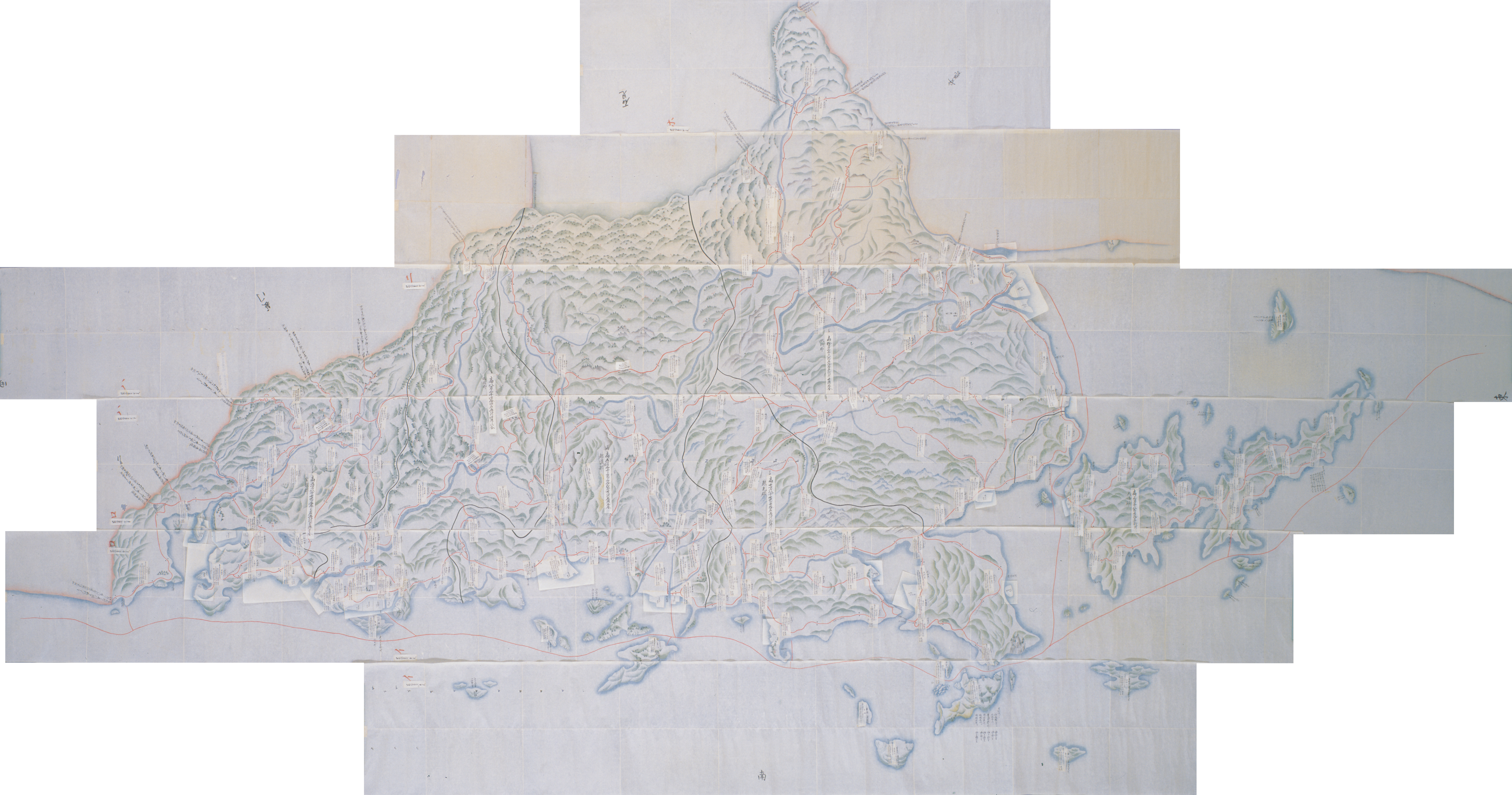
Tenpō Kuniezu - Suō Province (Yamaguchi Prefectural Archives)

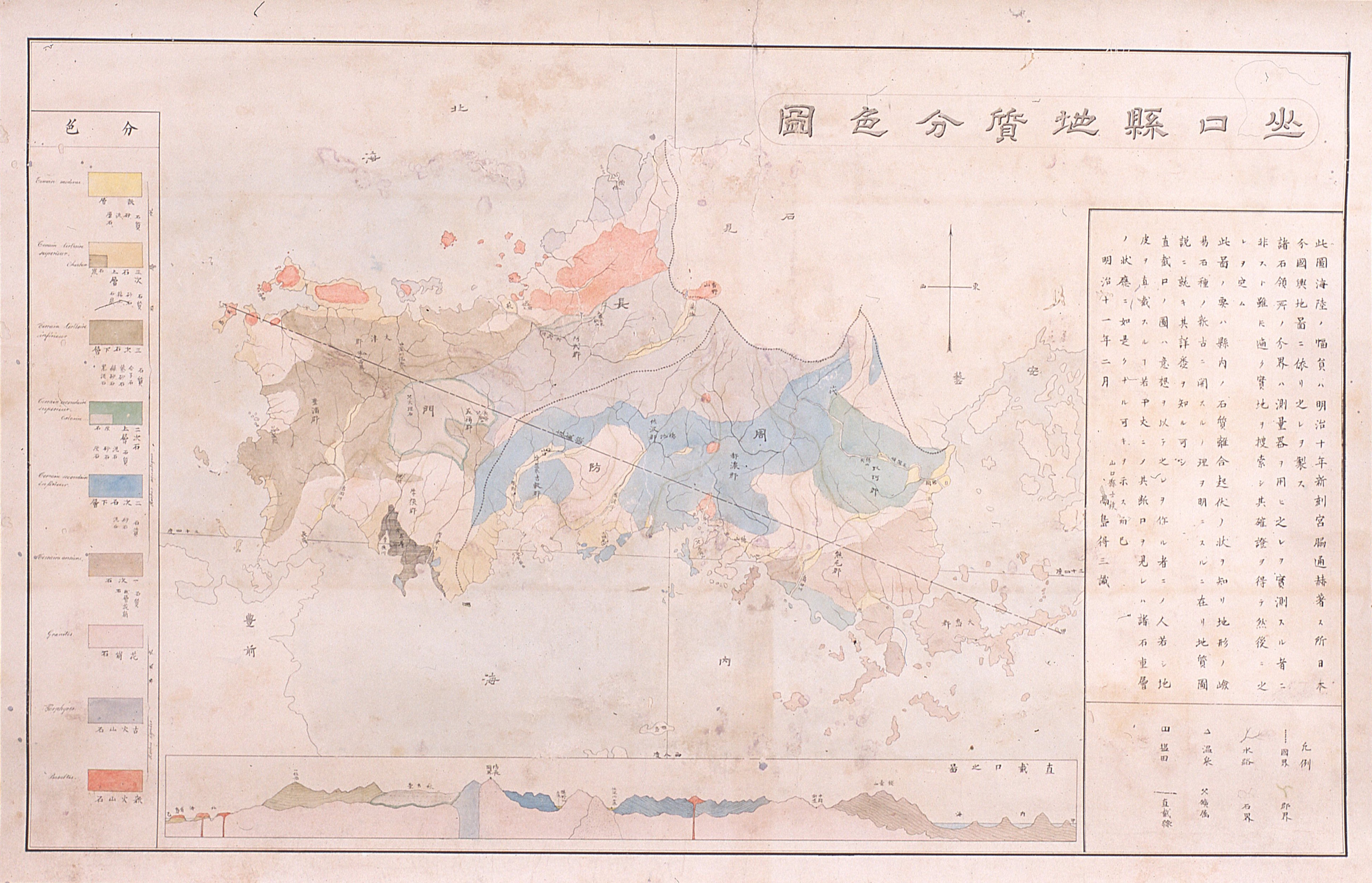
1878 map of Yamaguchi Prefecture, marked with its two constituent provinces of Suō (周防) and Nagato (長門), as well as neighbouring Iwami (石見) and Aki (安藝) (Yamaguchi Prefectural Archives)
