= Japanese missions to Ming China =

Japanese missions to Ming China represent a lens for examining and evaluating the relationships between China and Japan in the 15th through the 17th centuries. The nature of these bilateral contacts encompassed political and ceremonial acknowledgment as well as cultural exchanges. The evolution of diplomatic ties accompanied the growing commercial ties which grew over time.

Nineteen trade missions traveled from Japan to China between 1401 and 1547. The main trade goods exported from Japan were Japanese swords, copper, and sulfur; from China, copper coins, raw silk, and silk fabrics. Every one of these missions were headed by a Zen Buddhist monk from one of the so-called Kyoto Gozan (京都五山, Kyoto gozan) or "five great Zen temples of Kyoto", consisting of Nanzen-ji, Tenryū-ji, Shokoku-ji, Kennin-ji, Tofuku-ji and Manju-ji.

== Tally trade ==
The economic benefit of the Sinocentric tribute system was profitable trade. The tally trade (勘合貿易, kangō bōeki in Japanese and kanhe maoyi in Chinese) was a system devised and monitored by the Chinese. The tally trade involved exchanges of Japanese products for Chinese goods. The Chinese "tally" was a certificate issued by the Ming. The first 100 such tallies were conveyed to Japan in 1404. Only those with this formal proof of Imperial permission represented by the document were officially allowed to travel and trade within the boundaries of China; and only those diplomatic missions presenting authentic tallies were received as legitimate ambassadors.

Over time, the conditions of this mutually beneficial tally trade would evolve beyond its initial perimeters.

== Selected missions ==
Year	Sender	Envoys	Chinese monarch	Comments
1401–1402	Yoshimochi	Soa (祖阿)	Yongle	The formal diplomatic letter conveyed to the Emperor of China was accompanied by a gift of 1000 ounces of gold and diverse objects; returned with Ming ambassadors Tianlun Daoyi (天倫道彝) and Yian Yiru (一庵一如)
1403–1404	Yoshimochi	Kenchū Keimitsu (堅中圭密)	Yongle	Keimitsu was chief abbot of Tenryū-ji monastery. the mission party returned with Ming ambassadors Zhao Juren (趙居任) and Zhang Hong (張洪); also accompanied by monk Daocheng (道成); conveyed "Yongle tallies"
1404–1405	Yoshimochi	Myōshitsu Bonryō (明室梵亮)	Yongle	First tally vessel, returned with Ming ambassador Yu Shiji (俞士吉)
1405–1406	Yoshimochi	Minamoto no Michikata (源通賢)	Yongle	On orders of Ming emperor, repatriated captured Chinese pirates; returned with Ming ambassadors Pan Ci (潘賜) and Wang Jin (王進)
1406–1407	Yoshimochi	Kenchū Keimitsu (堅中圭密)	Yongle	Tribute mission of gratitude to the Ming; returned with Ming ambassador
1407	Yoshimochi	Kenchū Keimitsu (堅中圭密)	Yongle	With an embassy of 73, Keimitsu paid tribute and returned captured pirates
1408–1409	Yoshimochi	Kenchū Keimitsu (堅中圭密)	Yongle	the large mission party consisted of 300; Keimitsu paid tribute, offered captured pirates, and returned with Ming ambassor Zhou Quanyu (周全渝)
1410–1411	Yoshimochi	Kenchū Keimitsu (堅中圭密)	Yongle	Bringing news of installation of Shōgun Yoshimochi; returned with Ming ambassador Wang Jin
1433–1434	Yoshinori	Ryūshitsu Dōen (龍室道淵)	Xuande	Embassay of 220; returned with Xuande tallies; accompanied by Ming ambassadors Pan Ci and Lei Chun (雷春)
1435–1436	Yoshinori	Jochū Chūsei (恕中中誓)	Zhengtong	Returned with remaining Yongle tallies
1453–1454	Yoshimasa	Tōyō Inpō (東洋允澎)	Jingtai	Embassy of 1200 (350 reached the capital); returned with Jingtai tallies
1468–1469	Yoshimasa	Tenyo Seikei (天與清啓)	Chenghua	Returned left over Jingtai tallies to Ming and returned with Chenghua tallies
1477–1478	Yoshihisa	Jikuhō Myōbō (竺芳妙茂)	Chenghua	Embassy of 300
1484–1485	Yoshihisa	Ryōhaku Shūi (了璞周瑋)	Chenghua	
1495–1496	Yoshizumi	Gyōbu Jumei (堯夫壽蓂)	Hongzhi	Returned with Hongzhi tallies
1509	Yoshitane	Song Suqing (宋素卿)	Zhengde	Solo Hosokawa mission
1511–1513	Yoshitane	Ryōan Keigo (了庵桂悟)	Zhengde	Party of 600; returned with Zhengde tallies; returned leftover tallies from the Jingtai and Chenghua eras
1523	Yoshiharu	Sōsetsu Kendō (宗設謙道); Rankō Zuisa (鸞岡瑞佐)	Jiajing	Ōuchi had over 100 in party; Hosokawa had over 100; each domain sent own chief ambassador; parties clashed at Ningbo
1539–1541	Yoshiharu	Koshin Sekitei (湖心碩鼎)	Jiajing	Party of 456; solo Ōuchi mission
1547–1549	Yoshiteru	Sakugen Shūryō (策彥周良)	Jiajing	Party of 637; Ōuchi vessels; returned Hongzhi and Zhengde tallies

== See also ==
- Sinocentrism
- Japanese missions to Sui China
- Japanese missions to Tang China
- Japanese missions to Joseon
