= Song Suqing =

Chinese-Japanese businessperson (died 1525)

Song Suqing (宋素卿; died 1525), also known as Sō Sokei from the Japanese pronunciation of his name, was a Chinese-born diplomat of Muromachi and Sengoku period Japan. He was sold as a child to Japanese envoys in 1496, but came back to Ming China in 1509 and 1523 as an envoy of the Hosokawa clan. In the latter mission to China, he became embroiled in the Ningbo incident where the rival mission sent by the Ōuchi clan attacked him and plundered the cities of Ningbo and Shaoxing. Song Suqing was judged to have caused the incident and was thrown in jail where he died.

== Early life: the 1496 mission ==
Song Suqing was born in Yin County (鄞縣; present-day Yinzhou, Ningbo, Zhejiang) with the name Zhu Gao (朱縞). Because his father had died, he stayed with his uncle Zhu Cheng (朱澄), who worked as a lacquerware merchant. To support himself, Zhu Gao learned to sing and performed on the streets as a child. In 1496, he caught the attention of Tōshigorō (湯四五郎), a Japanese dealer who came with that year's tributary mission. At the time, the Japanese could only trade with China through the Chinese tributary system, where foreign envoys would present tribute to the Ming emperor in return for gifts from the emperor. Additionally, once the Japanese envoys landed at Ningbo, their designated port, they would have the opportunity to engage in trade with the local merchants in a controlled environment. This was how Tōshigorō chanced upon Zhu Gao in Yin County, near Ningbo, where he was impressed by the boy's voice and charms and started a close relationship with him. Tōshigorō then entrusted Zhu Gao and his uncle to sell his merchandise of Japanese swords and fans in return for Chinese lacquerware.

For some reason, Zhu Cheng could not uphold his end of the deal by the time the Japanese envoys were scheduled to return to Japan. By all accounts the Japanese goods were successfully sold, but the money from the transaction was squandered (either by himself or by another middleman) and Zhu Cheng could not fulfill the order of lacquerware. To prevent the Japanese from going to the authorities, Zhu Cheng settled the matter with Tōshigorō by handing over his nephew Zhu Gao as an indemnity. The boy was taken to Japan.

== Rise to fame: the 1509 mission ==
In Japan, Zhu Gao became known as Song Suqing. The Chinese source Shuyu Zhouzi Lu (殊域周咨錄) says the new name comes from the fact that his surname Zhu 朱 was written like the character Song 宋, while "Suqing" 素卿 shares the meaning of his name "Gao" 縞, which means "plain white silk". The Japanese source Sanetaka-kō ki (実隆公記) records that Zhu Gao considered "Suqing" his courtesy name, and this was what he identified himself by.

Since disembarking the Japanese envoy ship in the port city of Sakai, Song Suqing became somewhat of a celebrity for his talent in song and poetry. (Some Chinese sources allege that he pretended he was of imperial lineage.) Despite not knowing how to speak Japanese at first, he was able to communicate with the locals in writing, since Japan and China shared the same written language at the time. He was recruited into the service of the Hosokawa clan and was especially close with the daimyō Hosokawa Masamoto and the shōgun Ashikaga Yoshizumi. He was even granted a position in the Ministry of the Imperial Household (司農卿) and gained access into the imperial court in Kyoto. The Chinese source Shuyu Zhouzi Lu says that he was so respected that he was given the hand of "the daughter of the king", though the identity of the king in question is unclear. He had ten sons, amongst them one variously called Song Dongzhan (宋東瞻) or Song Yi (宋一) who eventually followed his father's footsteps as an envoy.

The Hosokawa was one of two clans who had the privilege to represent the Ashikaga shōgun to trade in China. In 1508, the other clan with this privilege, the Ōuchi, helped the exiled shōgun Ashikaga Yoshitane reclaim his position from Ashikaga Yoshizumi, who was supported by the Hosokawa. As a result, the Ōuchi was rewarded with the right to send two ships to China and the Hosokawa only one. The Hosokawa, unhappy about this arrangement, pre-empted the official mission by making Song Suqing the head envoy of an unofficial mission to China ahead of schedule. From Sakai, Song Suqing's ship sailed south around the Ōuchi controlled waters and reached Ningbo in 1509, two years ahead of the legitimate Ōuchi mission led by Ryōan Keigo.

As the Hosokawa mission made its way to the capital Beijing, Song Suqing's uncle Zhu Cheng recognized him but did not dare make himself known. Instead, he followed the mission to Suzhou, where he boarded Song Suqing's ship and reunited with his nephew. At this point it became known to the Ming officials that the Japanese head envoy was in fact a Chinese deserter, now liable for the death penalty since the maritime prohibition laws at the time banned Chinese people from going overseas under pain of death. Song Suqing bribed the powerful eunuch Liu Jin with a thousand ounces of gold in Beijing and he was exonerated: the official mitigating reasons being his position as the head envoy of a foreign country, and that he had confessed to his crimes. Song Suqing's mission did not have the proper memorial to the throne like an official mission, and consisted of only one ship out of the allotted 3, so the Chinese Ministry of Rites only rewarded the mission only one-third of the usual silver. Despite this, Song Suqing personally received favour from the Zhengde Emperor, and he was granted a robe with the flying-fish pattern—a robe indicating high rank—a practice unprecedented for foreign envoys.

When the official Ōuchi mission led by Ryōan Keigo finally arrived in October 1511, the Chinese considered Song Suqing's 1509 mission to have fulfilled Japan's quota of tributary missions for the decade. Even if Ryōan Keigo's mission was considered to be part of the same mission as Song Suqing's, Ryōan Keigo brought three ships which exceeded the allotted three since Song Suqing had already brought one in 1509. Thus the official Ōuchi mission was not as successful as the Hosokawa mission led by Song Suqing, and a dissatisfied Ryōan Keigo threatened a revival of Japanese piracy if the Chinese did not make concessions on trade. However, Ryōan Keigo managed to bring back the official tallies of the Zhengde emperor to the Ōuchi, with which the Ōuchi could prove the legitimacy of their future missions.

== Downfall: the 1523 mission ==
Encouraged by the success of the 1509 mission, the Hosokawa sent Song Suqing on another mission to Ming China in 1523, with the monk Rankō Zuisa (鸞岡端佐) as the head envoy. This time, however, they arrived in Ningbo a few days after the Ōuchi delegation, who also carried the most up-to-date Zhengde tallies. Song Suqing and Rankō Zuisa only had the outdated tallies of the Hongzhi Emperor, predecessor of Zhengde, but they managed to get preferable treatment after Song Suqing bribed the head eunuch of the Office of Shipping Trade (市舶司), Lai En (賴恩). The Hosokawa ship was allowed to unload first, and Rankō Zuisa was given the seat of honour at a welcoming banquet. Enraged, the Ōuchi delegation led by Kendō Sōsetsu (謙道宗設) went up in arms. They killed Rankō Zuisa, burned the Hosokawa ship, and chased Song Suqing to the walls of Shaoxing. Failing to find Song Suqing there, the Ōuchi band burned and plundered their way back to Ningbo, kidnapped a Chinese official, and made off to sea on commandeered ships.

Song Suqing was arrested by Ming Chinese officials for his part in the disturbance. (Both his patrons of the 1509 mission, Liu Jin and the Zhengde Emperor, were dead by this time.) Song Suqing claimed that the Ōuchi had stolen their tallies, leaving them no choice but to use the outdated tallies. The Ministry of Rites deemed Song Suqing's words untrustworthy, but recommended that since Song Suqing had been pardoned by the previous emperor, he should be allowed to return to Japan and have the shōgun sort out the matter of tallies. The recommendation was tentatively approved by the Jiajing Emperor, but members of the Censorate objected, saying Song Suqing's crimes were too grave to be pardoned. An investigation was hence opened by the Censorate, and in 1525 a verdict was reached: Song Suqing was sentenced to death along with two Ōuchi envoys that the Chinese managed to catch, but they all languished and died in prison in Hangzhou by spring of that year. The shōgun, not knowing the fate of Song Suqing, repeatedly made requests that he be returned to Japan, continuing as late as 1540.

== Cultural legacy ==
Song Suqing's story, or at least his name, left its mark in Japanese literature and theatre. The Japanese Confucian writer Tsuga Teishō (都賀庭鐘; 1718–1794) wrote a fictionalized account of Song Suqing's life in his Shigeshige ya wa (繁野話), putting emphasis on the tragedy befalling the man stuck between two worlds. In the story, Song Suqing has to abandon his wife and children to go to Japan, and although he gains fame and fortune in Japan, he finds his children living in extreme poverty in China. Finally, he is executed by the Ming dynasty for the crimes of his Japanese associates. In the kabuki play Sanmon Gosan no Kiri, Song Suqing's name is invoked by the character of Sō Sokei (宋蘇卿; a homonym of Song Suqing in Japanese). The kabuki version of Sō Sokei is ordered by the emperor of China to take over Japan, but is killed by Mashiba Hisayoshi (真柴久吉; kabuki alias for Toyotomi Hideyoshi). His orphaned son, the notorious outlaw Ishikawa Goemon, vows to avenge him.
