= Kenchū Keimitsu =

Kenchū Keimitsu (堅中圭密) was a Japanese Zen Buddhist monk and diplomat in the Muromachi period. He was the chief envoy of a mission sent by the Ashikaga shogunate to the court of the Yongle Emperor in Nanjing. He would return to China at the head of four subsequent missions to the Chinese Imperial court in Beijing.

== Tenryū-ji abbot ==
In 1403, Keimitsu was the chief abbot of Tenryū-ji monastery.

During the 1430s, the temple entered into a tributary relationship with the Imperial Court of Ming Dynasty China. Chinese imperial policy at the time forbade formal trade outside of the Sinocentric world order, and both the Japanese imperial court and Ashikaga shogunate refused to submit to Chinese suzerainty. This arrangement with the Tenryū-ji allowed for formal trade to be undertaken between the two countries, in exchange for China's control over the succession of chief abbot of the temple. This arrangement gave the Zen sect, and Tenryū-ji more specifically, a near monopoly on Japan's legitimate trade with China. In conjunction with the temple of the same name in Okinawa, as well as other Zen temples there, Tenryū-ji priests and monks played major roles in coordinating the China-Okinawa-Japan trade through to the 19th century.

== Missions to China ==
The economic benefit of the Sinocentric tribute system was profitable trade. The tally trade (kangō bōeki or kanhe maoyi in Chinese) involved exchanges of Japanese products for Chinese goods. The Chinese "tally" was a certificate issued by the Ming. The first 100 such tallies were conveyed to Japan by Kenchū Keimitsu in 1404. Only those with this formal proof of Imperial permission represented by the document were officially allowed to travel and trade within the boundaries of China; and only those diplomatic missions presenting authentic tallies were received as legitimate ambassadors.

Year	Sender	Envoys	Chinese monarch	Comments
1403–1404	Yoshimochi	Keimitsu	Yongle	Returned with Ming ambassadors Zhao Juren (趙居任) and Chang Hung (張洪); also accompanied by monk Daocheng (道成); conveyed "Yongle tallies"
1406–1407	Yoshimochi	Keimitsu	Yongle	Tribute mission of gratitude to the Ming; returned with Ming ambassador
1407	Yoshimochi	Keimitsu	Yongle	With an embassy of 73, Keimitsu paid tribute and returned captured pirates
1408–1409	Yoshimochi	Keimitsu	Yongle	the large mission party consisted of 300; Keimitsu presented tribute, offered captured pirates, and returned with Ming ambassor Zhou Quanyu (周全渝)
1410–1411	Yoshimochi	Keimitsu	Yongle	Bringing news of installation of Shōgun Yoshimochi; returned with Ming ambassador Wang Jin

== See also ==
- Japanese missions to Ming China
