= Keigo (given name) =

- Gender: Male

Origin
- Origin: Japanese
- Meaning: Different meanings depending on the kanji used

Keigo (written: 敬吾, 敬悟, 奎吾, 圭吾, 桂吾, 桂悟, 啓吾, 啓悟 or 慶悟) is a masculine Japanese given name. Notable people with the name include:

- Keigo Abe (阿部 圭吾; born 1938), Japanese karateka
- Keigo Higashi (東 慶悟; born 1990), Japanese footballer
- Keigo Higashino (東野 圭吾; born 1958), Japanese writer
- Kiyoura Keigo (清浦 奎吾; 1850–1942), Japanese politician
- Kotokasuga Keigo (琴春日 桂吾; born 1977), Japanese sumo wrestler
- Ryōan Keigo (了庵 桂悟; 1425–1514), Japanese Zen Buddhist monk and diplomat
- Keigo Masuya (桝屋 敬悟; born 1951), Japanese politician
- Keigo Numata (沼田 圭悟; born 1990), Japanese footballer
- Keigo Ōuchi (大内啓伍; 1930–2016), Japanese politician
- Keigo Oyamada (小山田 圭吾; born 1969), known as Cornelius, Japanese musician and producer
- Keigo Shimizu (清水 啓吾; born 1939), Japanese swimmer
- Keigo Sonoda (園田 啓悟; born 1990), Japanese badminton player
- Keigo Yamashita (山下 敬吾; born 1978), Japanese Go player
- Keigo Sato (佐藤 景瑚; born 1998), Japanese idol, member of JO1

== Fictional characters ==
- Keigo Takami (鷹見啓悟), also known as Hawks, a character from the manga and anime My Hero Academia
- Keigo Kazama, a character from the game and anime Dream Festival!

== See also ==
- Keigo (敬語; literally "respectful language" in Japanese)
