= Sakugen Shūryō =

Japanese diplomat

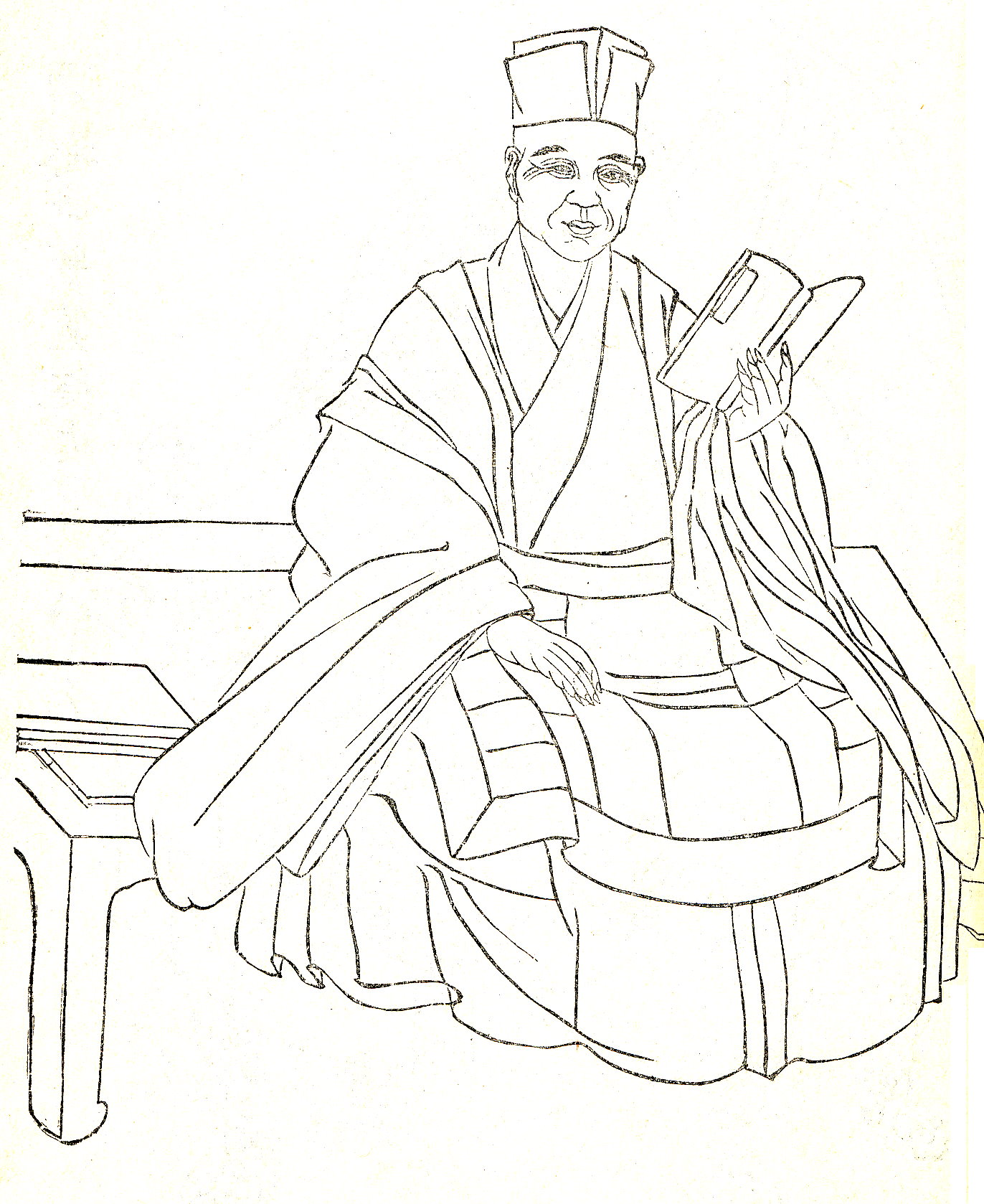
Sakugen Shūryō, from Shūko-Jyusshu (19th century)

Sakugen Shūryō (策彦 周良; April 19, 1501 – July 23, 1579) was a Japanese Zen Buddhist monk, a poet and diplomat in the Muromachi period. He was the chief envoy of a 1547 mission sent by the Ashikaga shogunate to the court of the Jiajing Emperor in Beijing.

== Tenryū-ji abbot ==
Sakugen was a member of the community of monks at Tenryū-ji before his travels in China from 1538 to 1541 and from 1546 to 1550.

He was the vice envoy of the mission which traveled to China in 1541. The trade negotiations proceeded smoothly, and in the leisurely months of his stay, Sakugen spent his time sightseeing, visiting Chinese poets and studying Chinese styles of composition. He would later write several books about his experiences in China.

In China, Sakugen bought or received as gifts 17 books which were later copied and distributed in Japan.

He would be named abbot of the Tenryū-ji monastery.

== Missions to China ==
The economic benefit of the Sinocentric tribute system was profitable trade. The tally trade (kangō bōeki or kanhe maoyi in Chinese) involved exchanges of Japanese products for Chinese goods. The Chinese "tally" was a certificate issued by the Ming. The first 100 such tallies were conveyed to Japan in 1404. Only those with this formal proof of Imperial permission represented by the document were officially allowed to travel and trade within the boundaries of China; and only those diplomatic missions presenting authentic tallies were received as legitimate ambassadors.

Year	Sender	Envoys	Chinese monarch	Comments
1539–1541	Yoshiharu	Koshin Sekitei, chief envoy Sakugen Shūryō, vice envoy	Jiajing	Party of 456; solo Ōuchi mission
1547–1549	Yoshiteru	Shūryō	Jiajing	Party of 637; Ōuchi vessels; returned Hongzhi and Zhengde; tallies; reported that some of the Hongzhi tallies had been stolen.

== See also ==
- Japanese missions to Ming China
