= Ningbo incident =

1523 brawl in Ningbo, China

The Ningbo incident (Chinese: 寧波之亂; Japanese: 寧波の乱) was a 1523 brawl between trade representatives of two Sengoku Japanese daimyō clans — the Ōuchi and the Hosokawa — in the Ming Chinese southeastern coastal city of Ningbo. The Ōuchi pillaged and harmed local residents, causing massive damage. The turmoil resulted in the interruption of the Ming-Japanese trade and led to a surge in piratical (wokou) activity on the Chinese coast. The episode is also known by the names Ningbo tribute conflict (寧波争貢事件), Mingzhou incident (明州之亂, Mingzhou being an ancient name for Ningbo), or the Sōsetsu incident (宗設之亂).

== Background ==
Ming China considered Japan a tributary state in its Sinocentric world order. Under the Ming tributary system, Japan could present tribute to the Chinese imperial court and be rewarded in the form of gifts by the emperor. This was essentially an exchange of Japanese products for Chinese goods, and, being the only legal form of trade between China and Japan during the Ming's maritime prohibitions, was extremely profitable. The Japanese were assigned the city of Ningbo as their port of entry into China, and only those with tallies granted by the emperor were officially allowed to travel and trade within the boundaries of China. Hence, the Ming-Japan trade was called the "tally trade" (勘合貿易, kangō bōeki in Japanese and kānhé màoyì in Chinese).

The handling of the tally trade on the Japanese side was the responsibility of the "King of Japan", as the Chinese called the Ashikaga shōgun. However, after the Ōnin War broke out in Japan in 1467, the Ashikaga shōguns were reduced to such powerlessness that control of the lucrative China trade became contested between the nominal Ashikaga vassals the Hosokawa clan in Kyoto and the Ōuchi clan of Yamaguchi.

== The tribute conflict ==
In May 1523, trade fleets from both the Hosokawa and the Ōuchi clans arrived in Ningbo. The Ōuchi delegation, led by Kendō Sōsetsu (謙道宗設), carried the most up-to-date tally from the Zhengde Emperor and reached Ningbo before the Hosokawa delegation led by Rankō Zuisa (鸞岡端佐) and Song Suqing, who carried the outdated tallies of Zhengde's predecessor Hongzhi. Despite this, Song Suqing was able to use his connections to bribe the head eunuch of the Office of Shipping Trade (市舶司), Lai En (賴恩), so the Hosokawa party was received first and got preferential treatment. Enraged, the Ōuchi party went up in arms, killed Rankō Zuisa, burned the Hosokawa ship, and chased Song Suqing to the walls of Shaoxing. Failing to find Song Suqing there, the armed band burned and plundered their way back to Ningbo. They kidnapped a garrison commander Yuan Jin (袁璡) and made off to sea on commandeered ships. A Ming flotilla gave chase under the command of Liu Jin (劉錦), the Regional Commissioner against the Wokou (備倭都指揮), but the Ōuchi party defeated them in battle and killed the commander.

== Aftermath ==
One of Kendō Sōsetsu's ships was blown to the coast of Joseon Korea by storm during their escape. Joseon Korea, being an ally and vassal of Ming China, killed 30 of the crew and captured two prisoners, Nakabayashi (中林) and Magotaro (望古多羅), who were handed over to Ming China. In China, Nakabayashi and Magotaro were subjected to investigation along with Song Suqing. Song Suqing claimed that the Ōuchi had stolen their tallies, leaving them no choice but to use the outdated tallies; however, the Ministry of Rites deemed Song Suqing's words untrustworthy. In 1525, all three were sentenced to death, but they had all languished and died in prison before the sentence was carried out. A Ryukyu envoy was instructed to relay a message to Japan urging the rendition of Kendō Sōsetsu and the return of Yuan Jin and other captive coastal inhabitants, otherwise China would close its ports to Japan and consider a punitive expedition.

The Chinese investigation also uncovered the extent of the corruption involving foreign trade by Lai En and his henchmen. For these reasons, the port of Ningbo was closed to foreign trade, but Lai En retained his post until 1527 and actually had his powers expanded to deal with military emergencies. Although Japan continued to send tributary fleets to Ningbo, only two more (sent by the Ōuchi) were received in 1540 and 1549, after which the downfall of the Ōuchi family ended the official Ming-Japan trade. The cessation of foreign trade at Ningbo turned local merchants wishing to trade with the Japanese and other foreigners to engage in illicit trading on the offshore islands of Zhejiang and Fujian provinces like Shuangyu. Some Chinese merchants and influential families began to owe the foreigners huge sums of debt as a result of this unregulated trade, which they would try to clear by informing the authorities to militarily clamp down on the illegal trade centers. To protect their goods and recover their losses, the participants of the foreign trade armed themselves against the Ming military and engaged in piratical and smuggling activities. This led to the widespread Jiajing wokou raids that terrorized the coast of China in the 1550s.
