= Tōfuku-ji =

Buddhist temple in Kyoto, Japan

Tōfuku-ji 東福寺
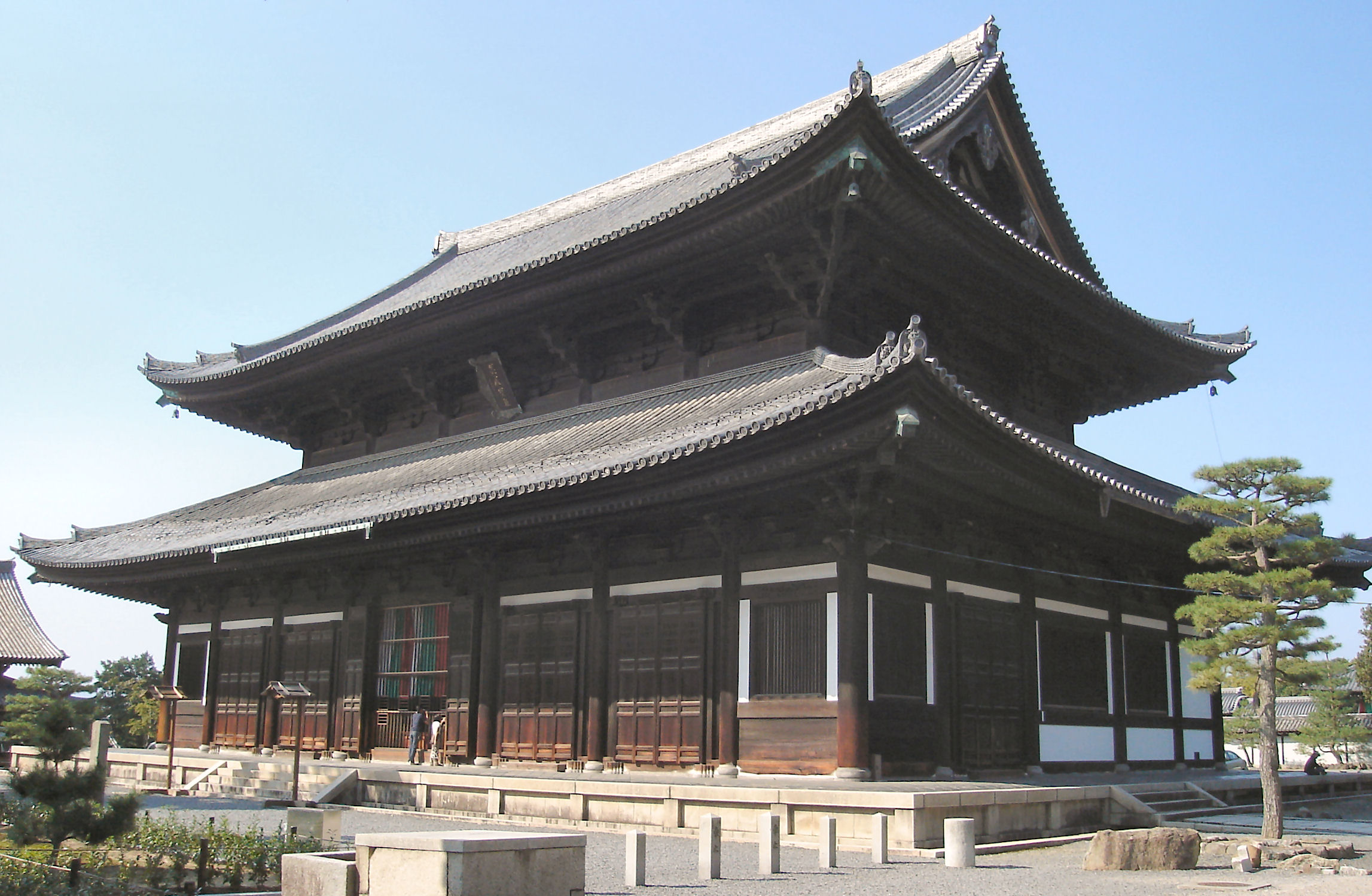
- Main Hall

Religion
- Affiliation: Tōfuku-ji Rinzai, Fuke
- Deity: Shaka Nyorai (Śākyamuni)
- Status: Head temple, Five Mountain Temple (Kyoto)

Location
- Location: 15-Chōme 778 Honmachi, Higashiyama-ku, Kyōto, Kyoto Prefecture
- Country: Japan
- Interactive map of Tōfuku-ji 東福寺
- Coordinates: 34°58′37.38″N 135°46′26.74″E

Architecture
- Founder: Enni Ben'en and Kujō Michiie
- Established: 1236
- Completed: 1917 (Reconstruction)

Website
- http://www.tofukuji.jp/

Tōfuku-ji (東福寺) is a Buddhist temple in Higashiyama-ku in Kyoto, Japan. Tōfuku-ji takes its name from two temples in Nara, Tōdai-ji and Kōfuku-ji. It is one of the Kyoto Gozan or "five great Zen temples of Kyoto". Its honorary sangō prefix is Enichi-san (慧日山).

== History ==
Tōfuku-ji was founded in 1236 by the imperial chancellor Kujō Michiie. He appointed the monk Enni as founding priest, who had studied Rinzai Zen Buddhism in China under the monk Wuzhun Shifan and who founded Jōten-ji temple in Hakata upon his return to his homeland. Tōfuku-ji temple burned down but was rebuilt in the 14th century according to original plans. It was because of this fire damage that a merchant ship was sent to Yuan China to replace damaged artifacts and to obtain special construction materials. The ship, however that later became known as the Shinan ship sank on her return journey close to Korean shores.

Tōfuku-ji temple was regarded as a remarkable replica of the Chinese public monasteries in Zhejiang Province, which Japanese monks frequently visited in the thirteenth century.

Tofuku-ji was one of the five temples of the Five Mountain System.

The temple was greatly reduced in size from 70 buildings to 25 during the Meiji era after the Shinbutsu bunri decree. In 1881, a fire burned down many major buildings such as the Main Hall, the Hōjo, the Hattō and the statue of Sakyamuni Buddha. During the Russo-Japanese War, the temple area was requisitioned and became a prisoner-of-war camp for Russians.

Both the main hall and the Hattō were rebuilt in 1917, and a new statue of Sakyamuni Buddha was later relocated to the temple in 1934.

== Abbots ==
In 1486 Ryōan Keigo became the 171st abbot of Tōfuku-ji. At the end of the 16th century Ankokuji Ekei was appointed abbot. From 1980 to 2009 Tōfuku-ji has been led by head abbot Keidō Fukushima.

== Architecture ==
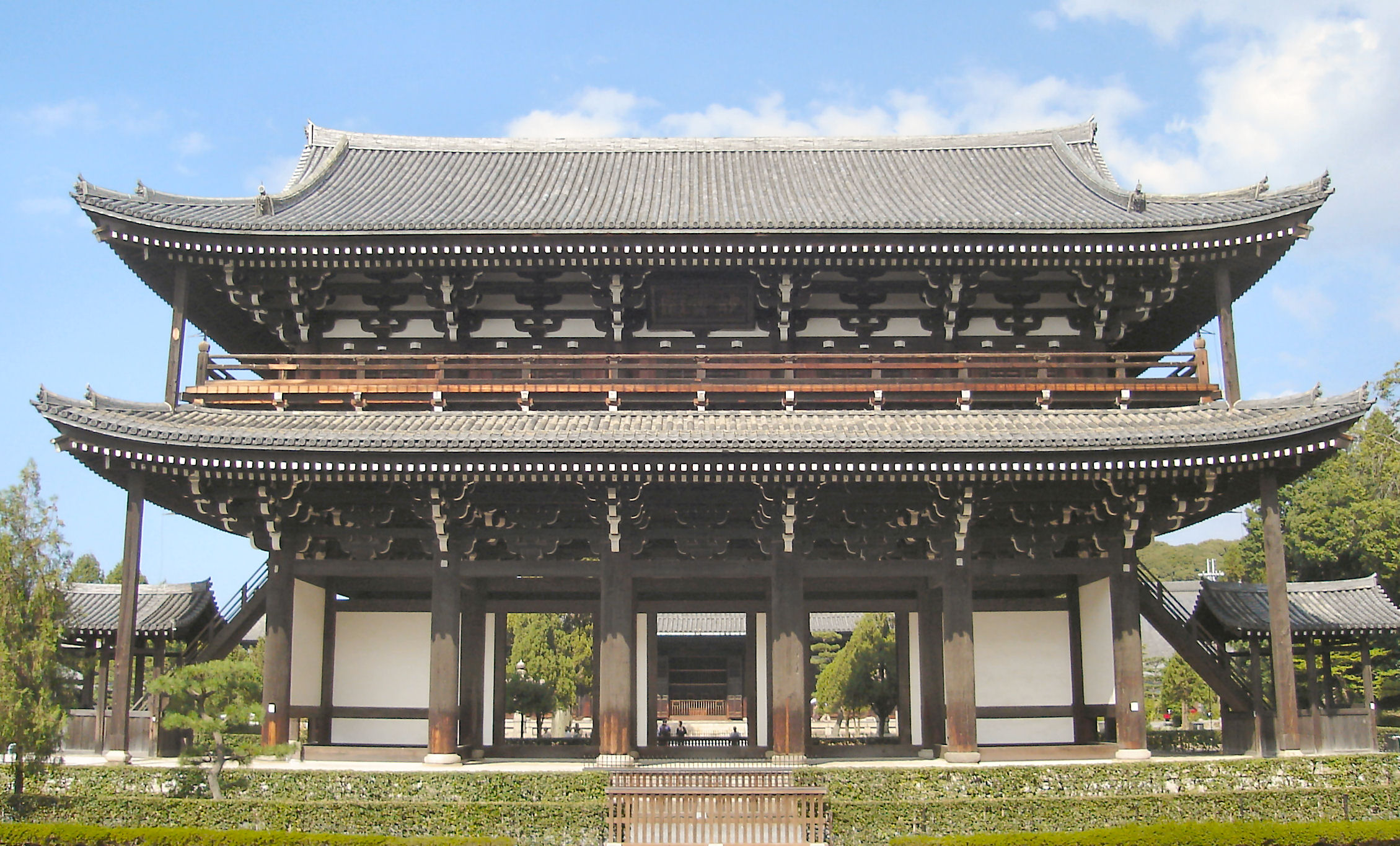
The main gate

Tōfuku-ji's main gate is the oldest sanmon in Japan. It is a National Treasure of Japan. It is two stories high and five bays wide. The central three bays are doors.

Currently, the Tōfuku-ji complex includes 24 sub-temples, though in the past the number has been as high as 53.

The complex includes Japan's oldest communal toilet, which was built in the first half of the muromachi period. In October 2022, a car crashed through and damaged the wooden doors and supporting pillars at the entrance to the toilet.

== Artwork ==
Tōfuku-ji's large nehan-zu painting depicts Buddha on his death bed. This massive image (7 x 14 meters) is the second largest in Japan. The image at nearby Sennyū-ji is the largest of its kind in Japan, measuring 8 x 16 meters. Both images are rarely displayed, most recently in 2003 for three days only.

A 1238 portrait painting of Wuzhun Shifan along with an inscription by an anonymous author was brought to the temple by Enni in the 1240s and remains there today. Plaques of Wuzhun's calligraphy are also kept at Tōfuku-ji.

In 1933 the Nihonga painter Inshō Dōmoto painted the large and vivid "Blue Dragon" ceiling painting for one of the halls, which he painted in 17 days.

== Garden ==
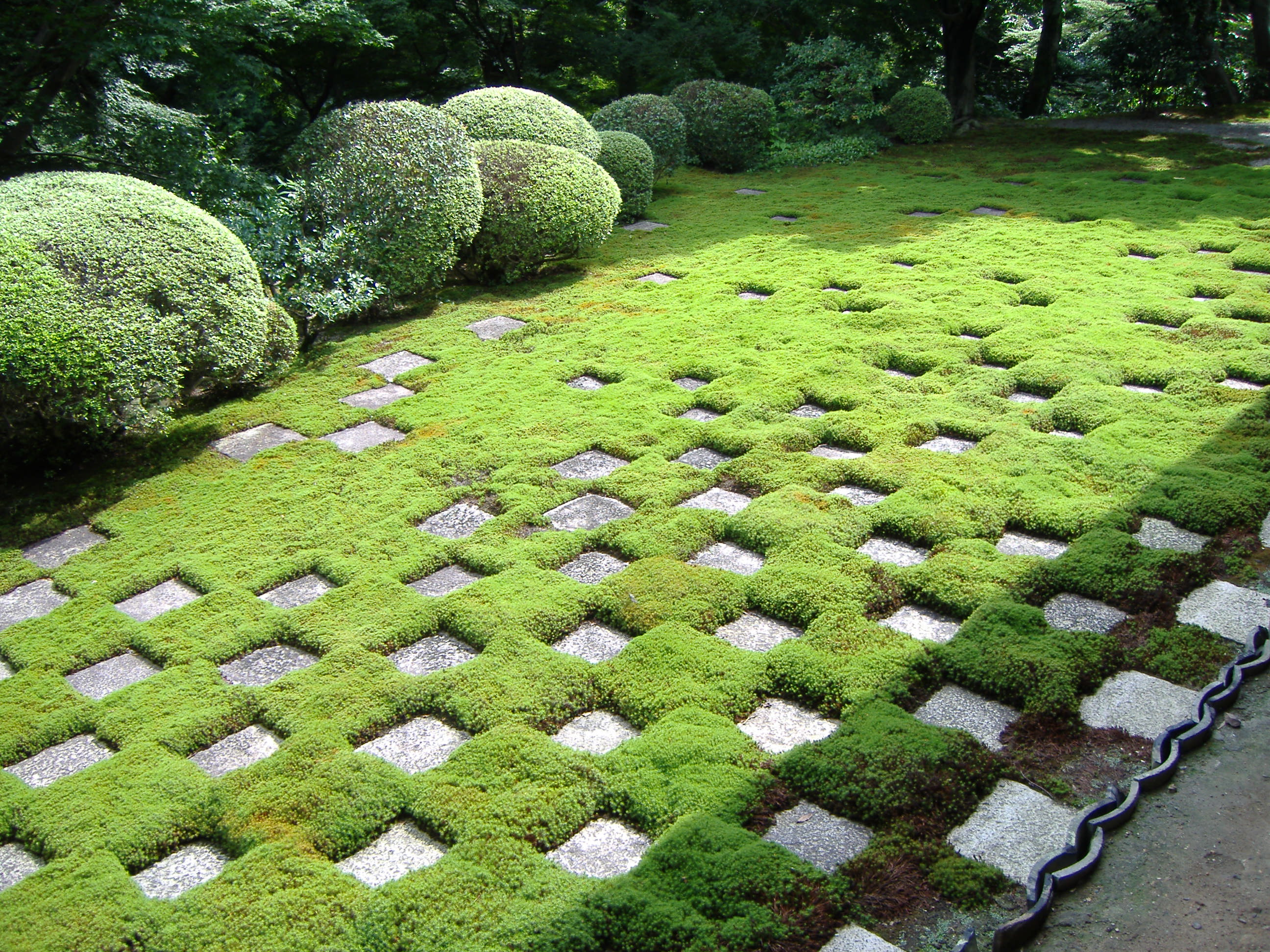
The moss garden

There are a number of gardens in the various precincts of Tōfuku-ji. The current gardens were designed by landscape architect Mirei Shigemori in the summer and autumn of 1939. The moss garden in particular has been emblematic of the renewal of Japanese gardening principles in the 20th century.

The temple features a large number of Japanese maple trees, and is most crowded during the autumn season when people flock to see the autumn foliage. It is a tradition to view the leaves from the Tsūten-kyō bridge.

== Images ==
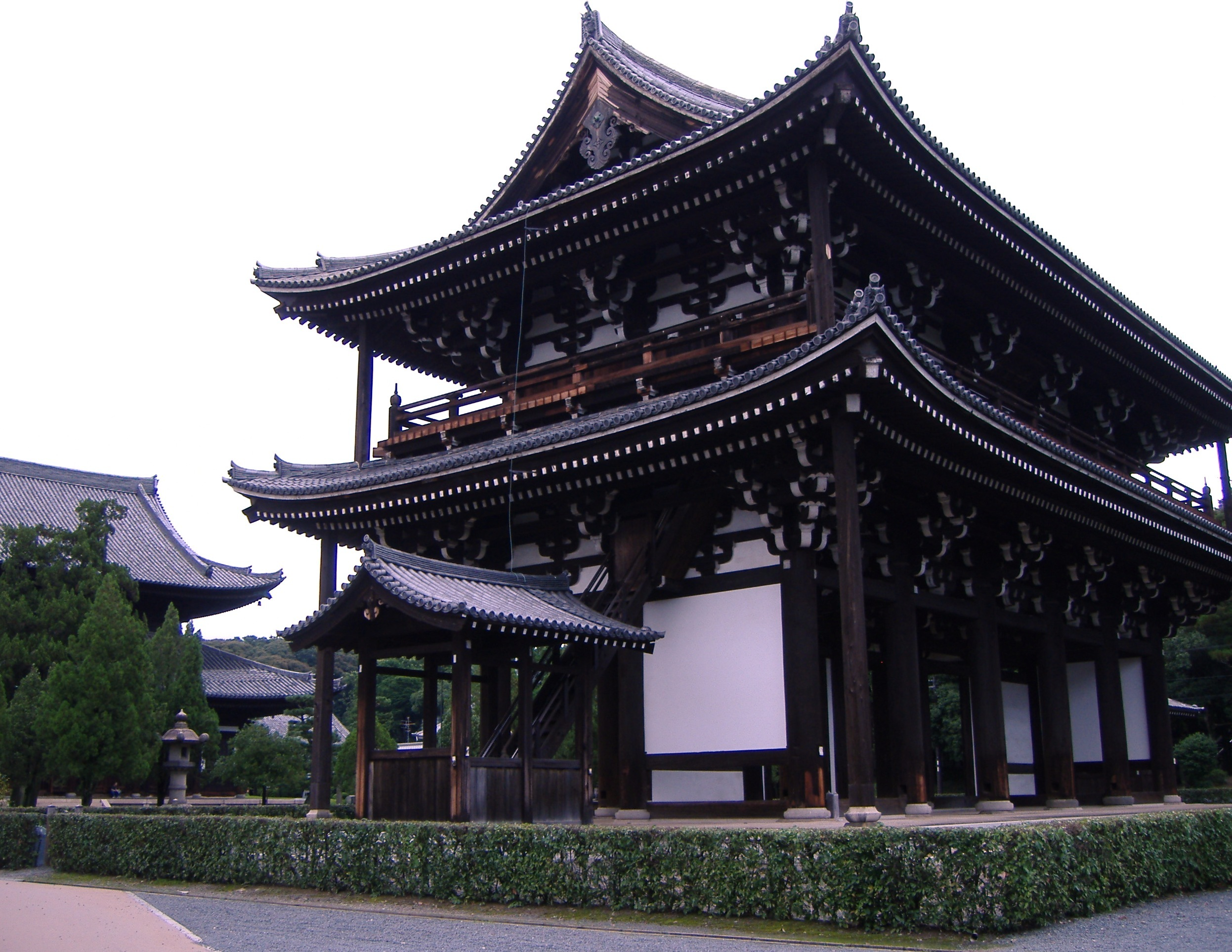
Main gate, side view

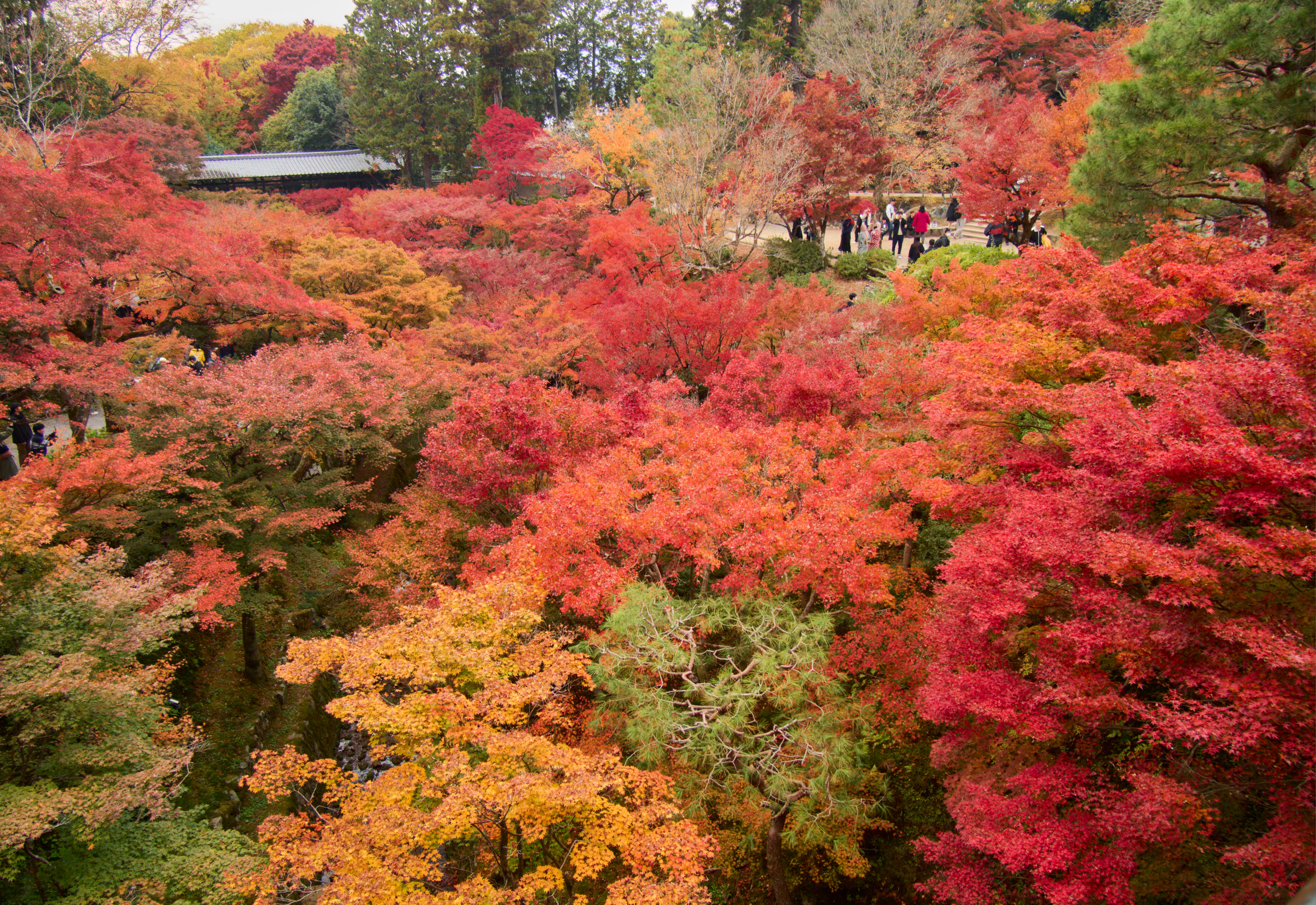
Autumn foliage over the ravine garden

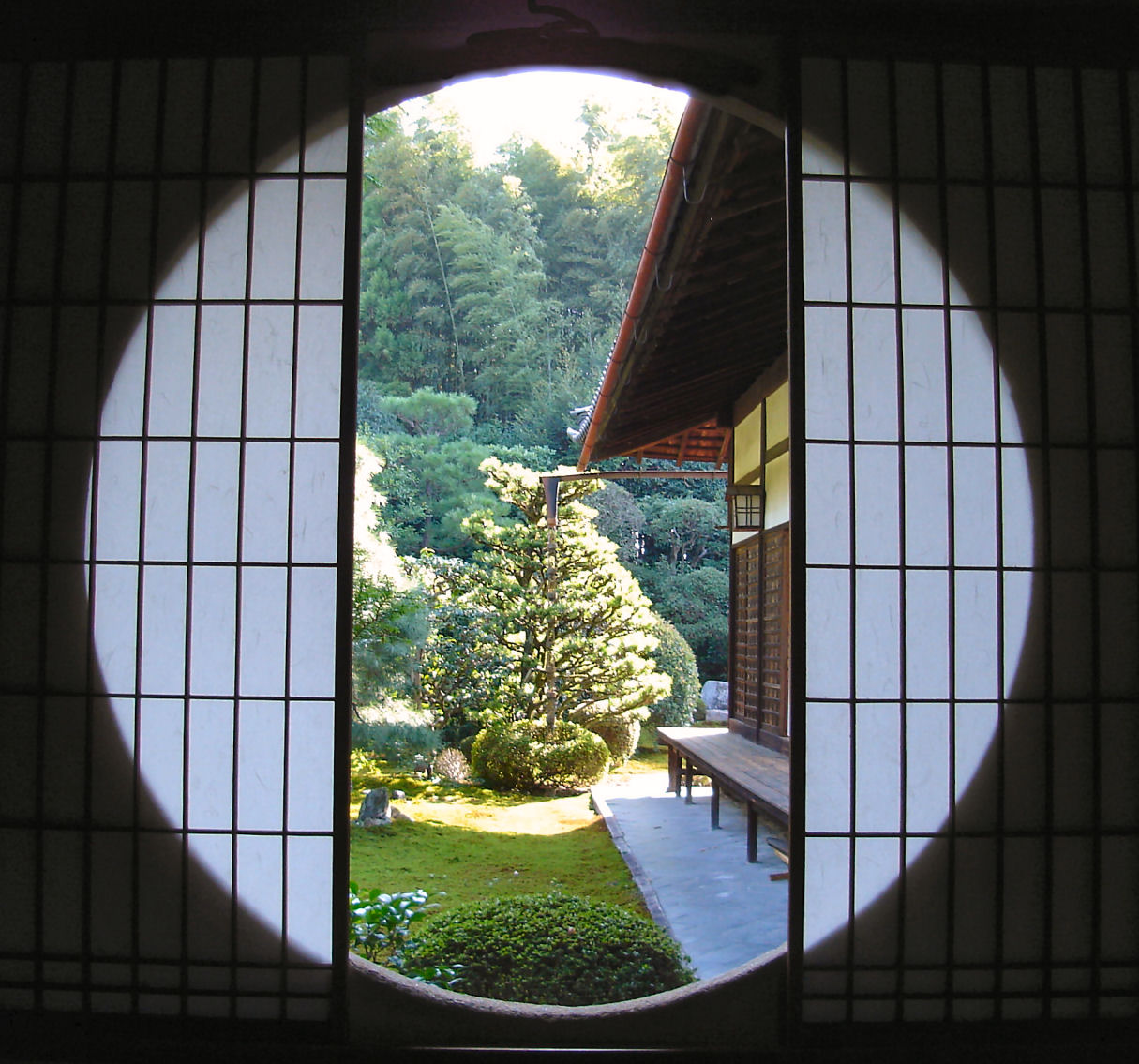
View from interior

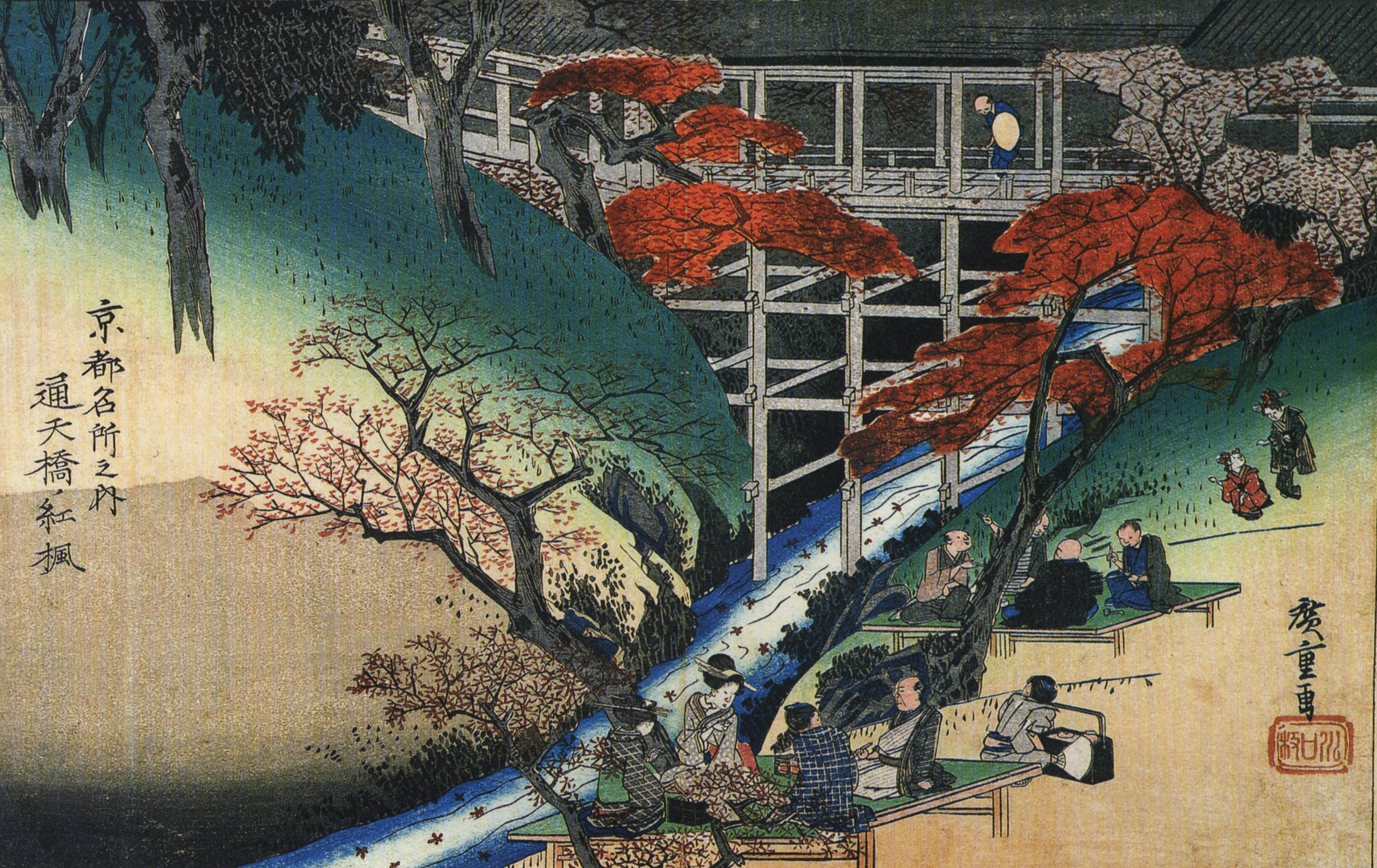
Scenic drawing of Tsūten-kyō bridge, by Hiroshige

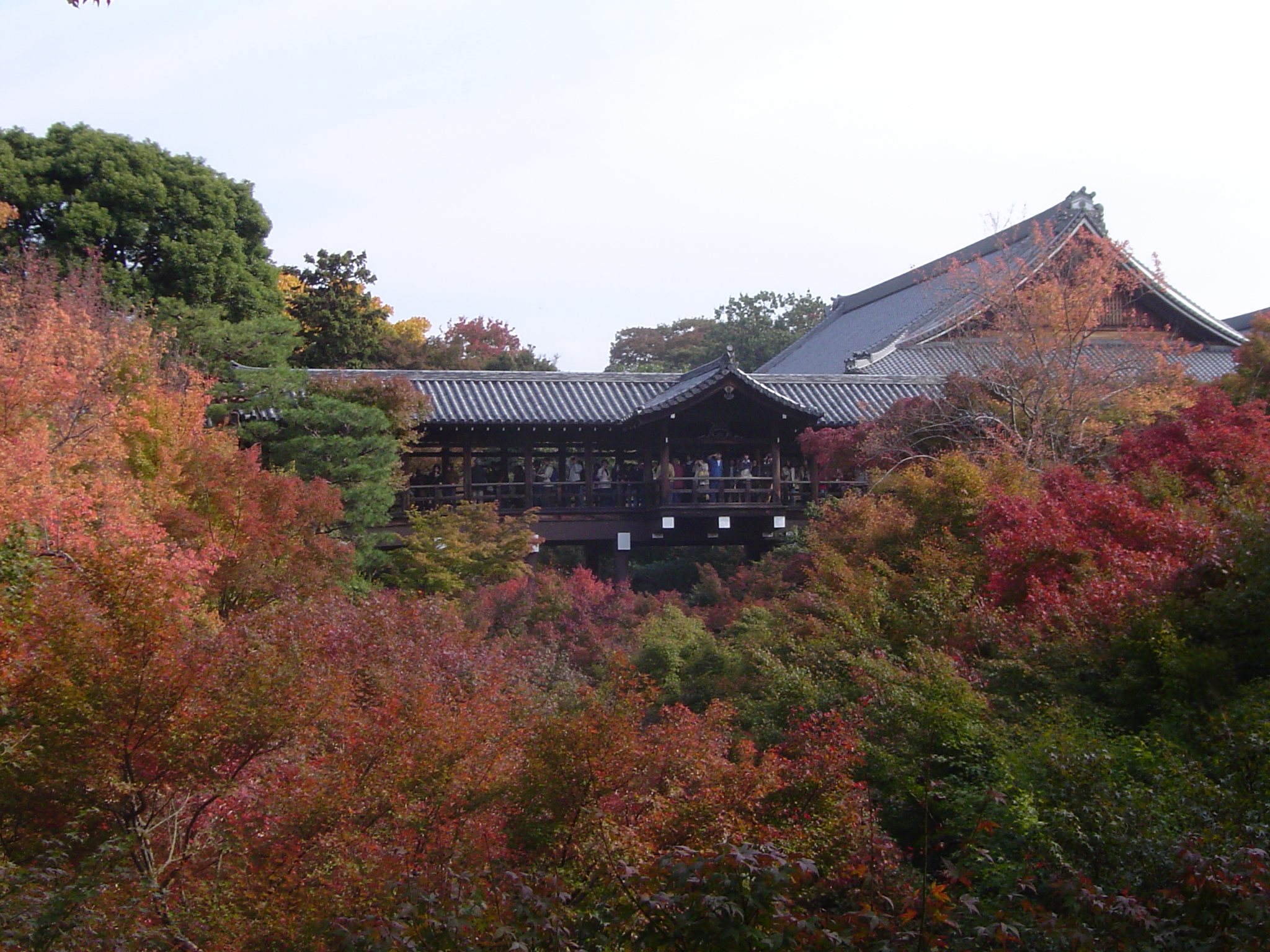
Tsūten-kyō bridge during autumn

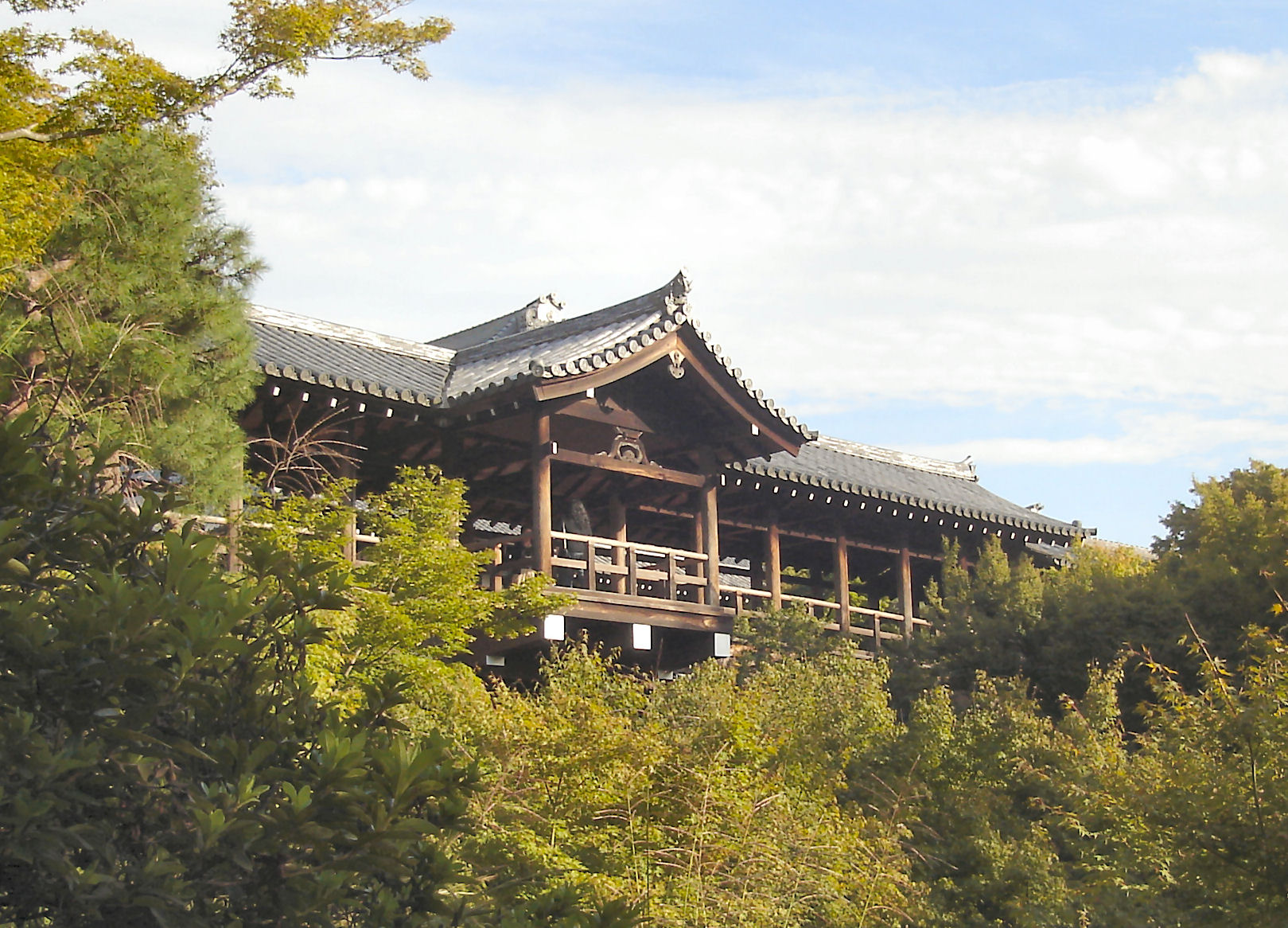
Tsūten-kyō

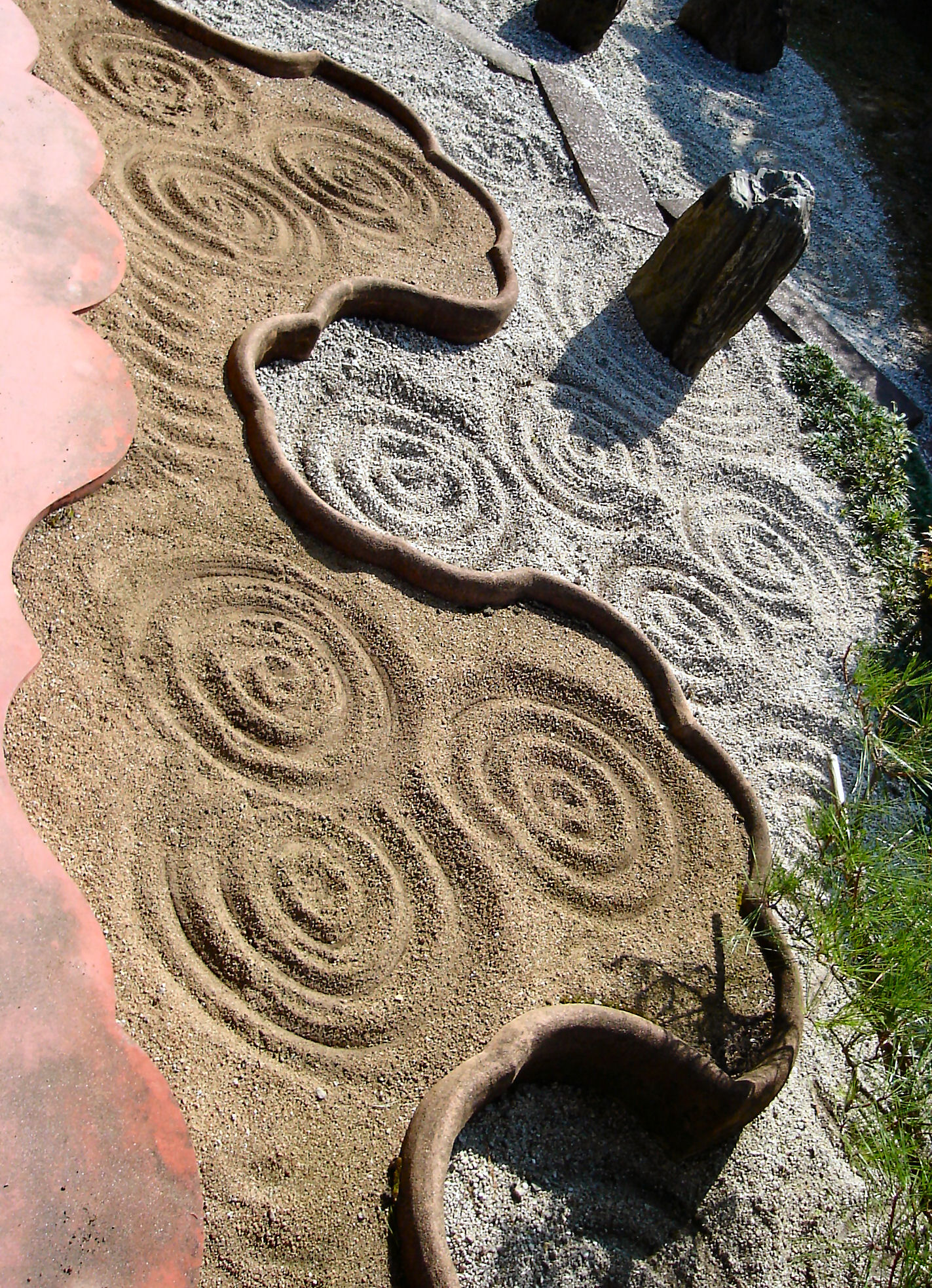
Dry Zen garden at Reiun-in

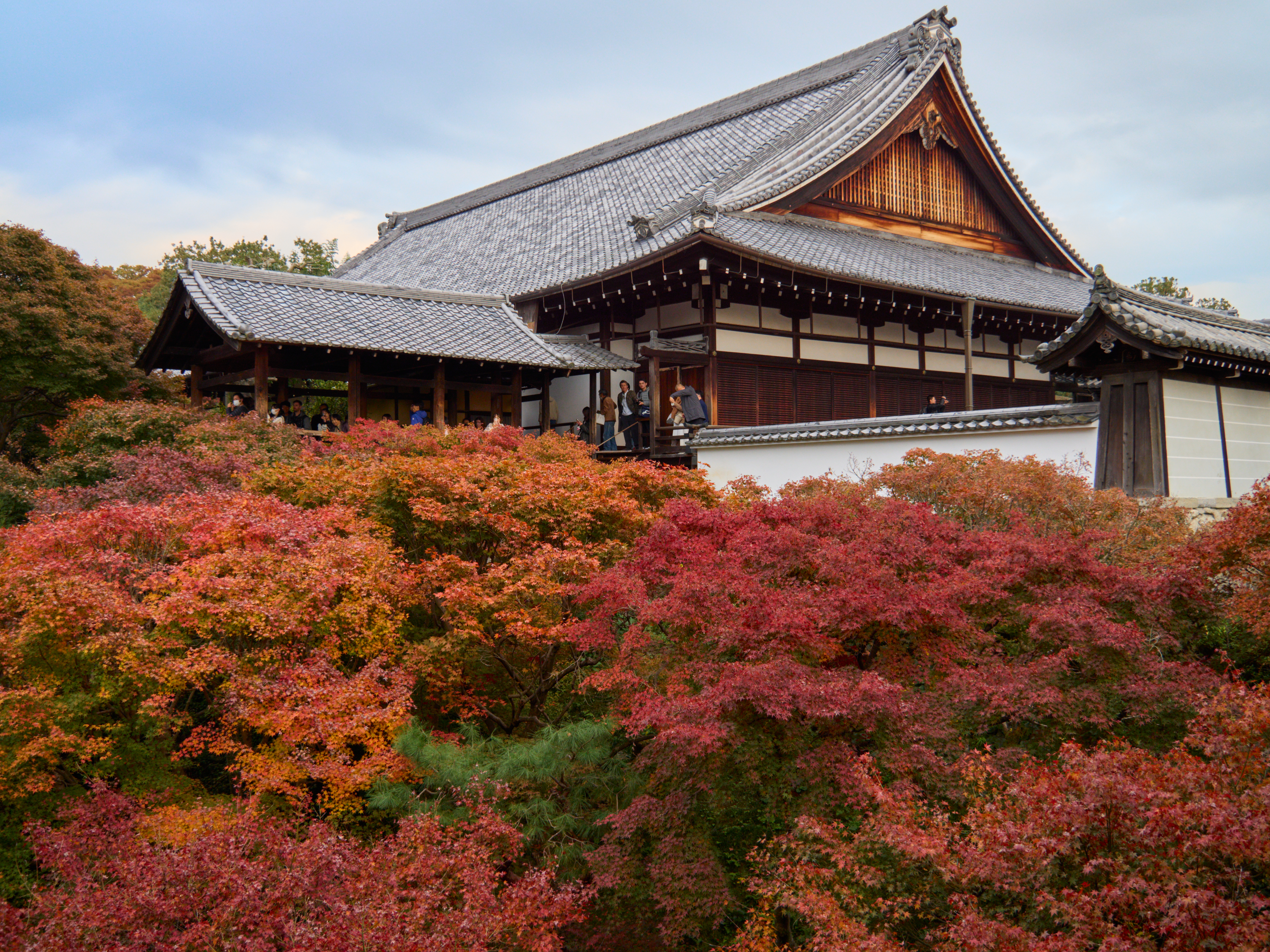
The main hall of Tofuku-ji temple surrounded by Japanese maple trees in autumn foliage.

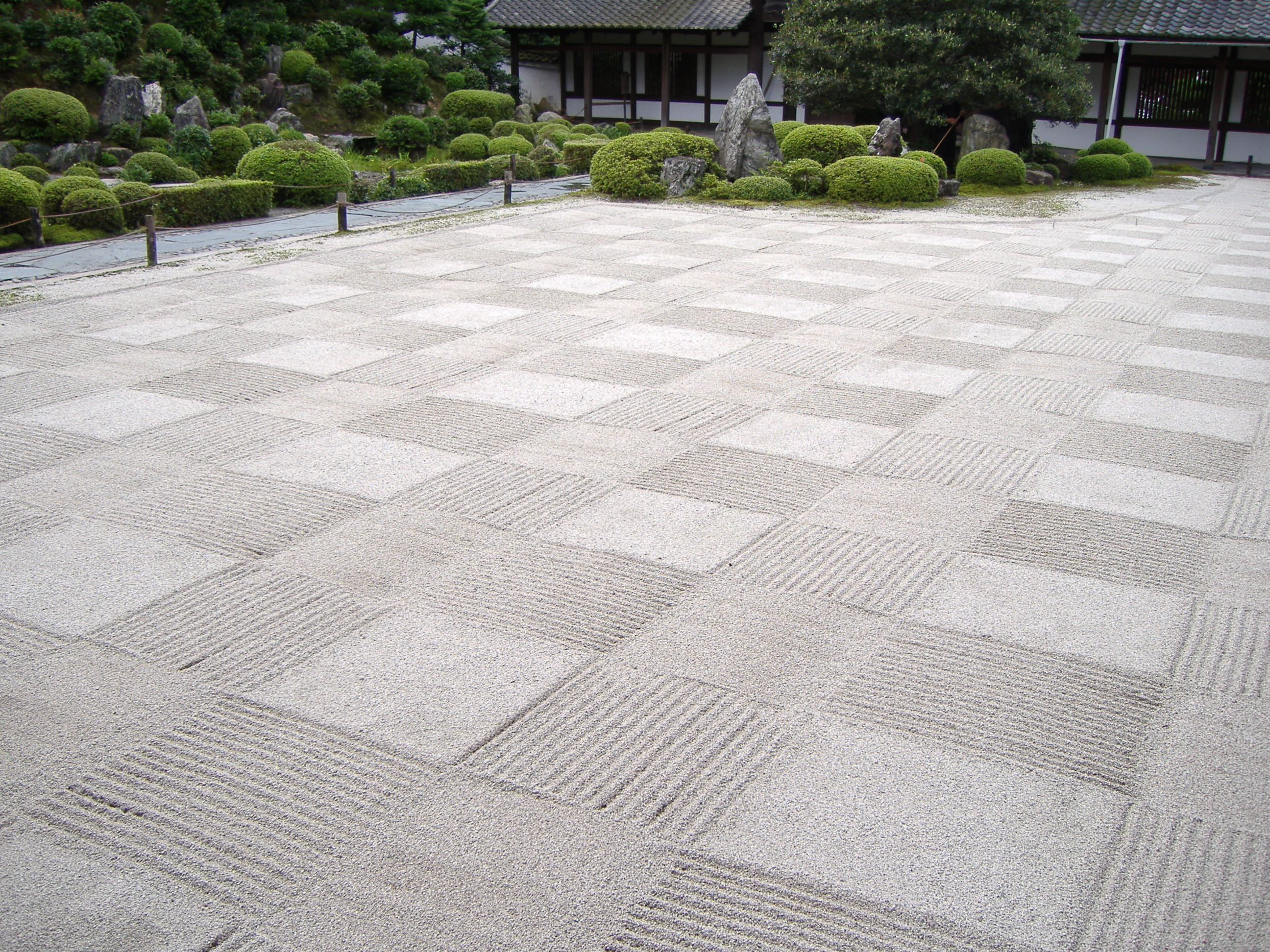
Garden at Kaizandō

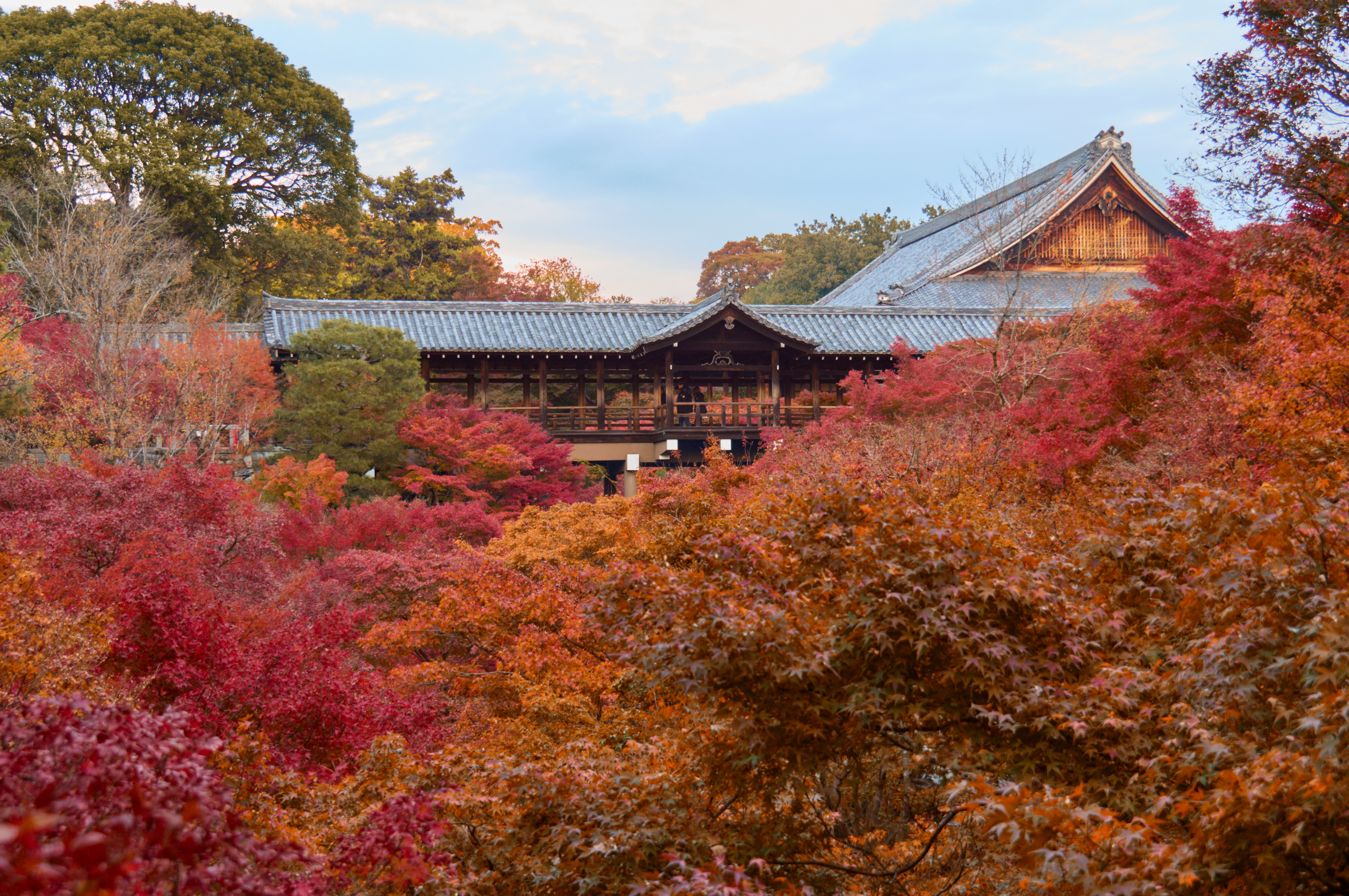
The Tsutenkyo Bridge and main hall of Tofuku-ji temple surrounded by Japanese maple trees in autumn foliage.

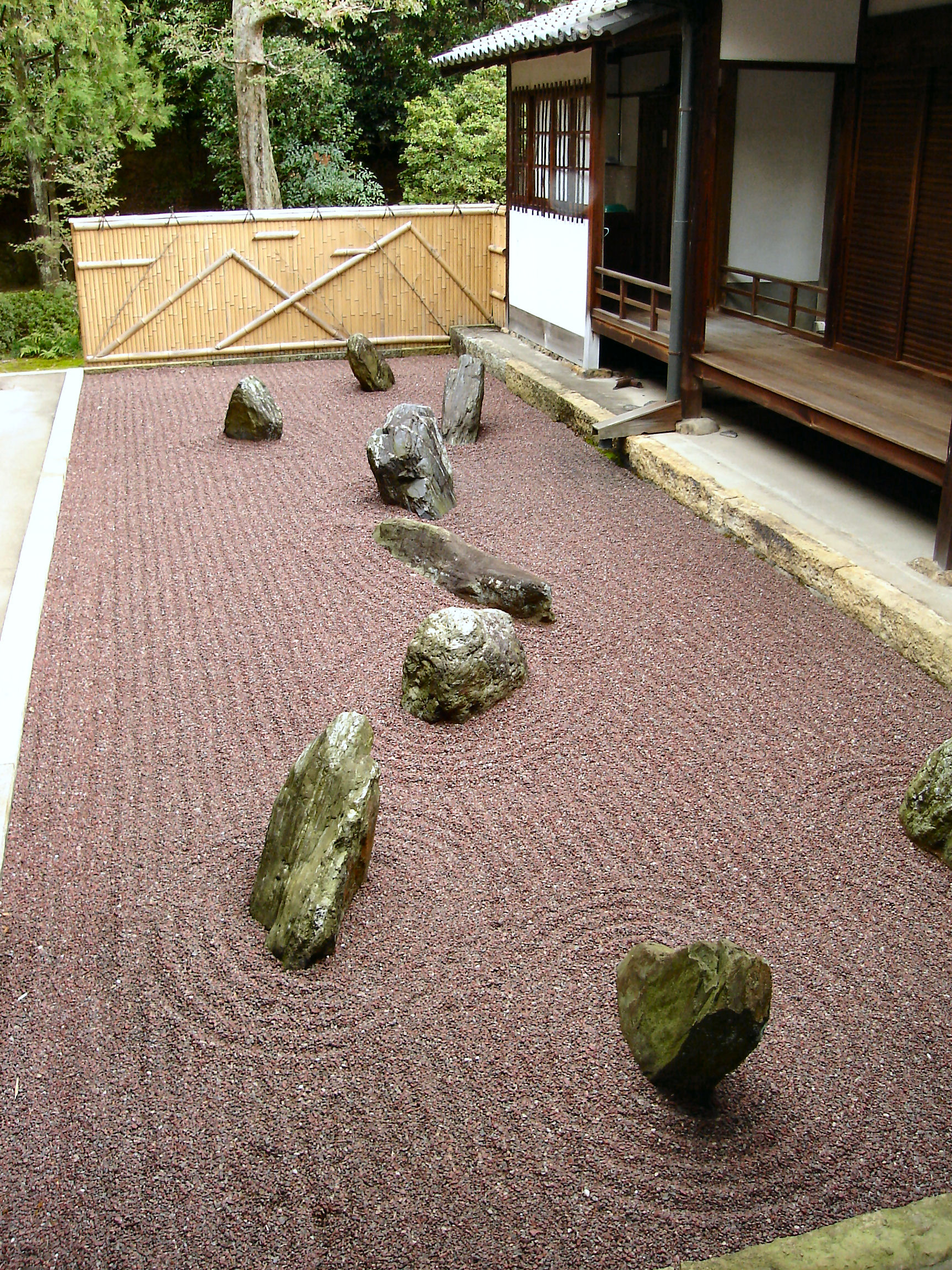
Garden at Ryoginan-tōtei

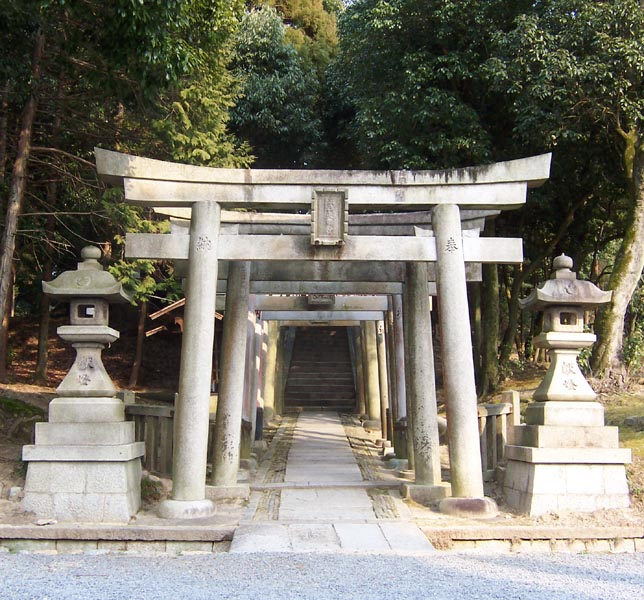
Torii gates leading to steps

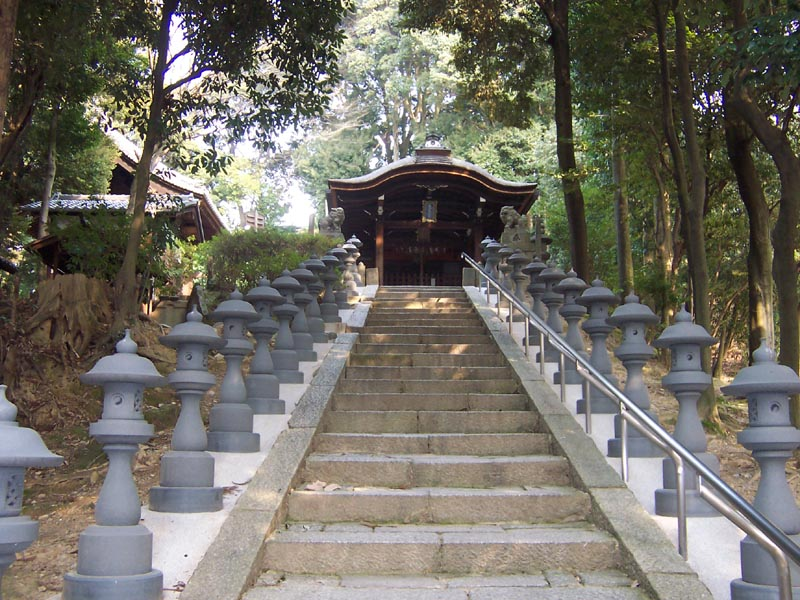
Steps

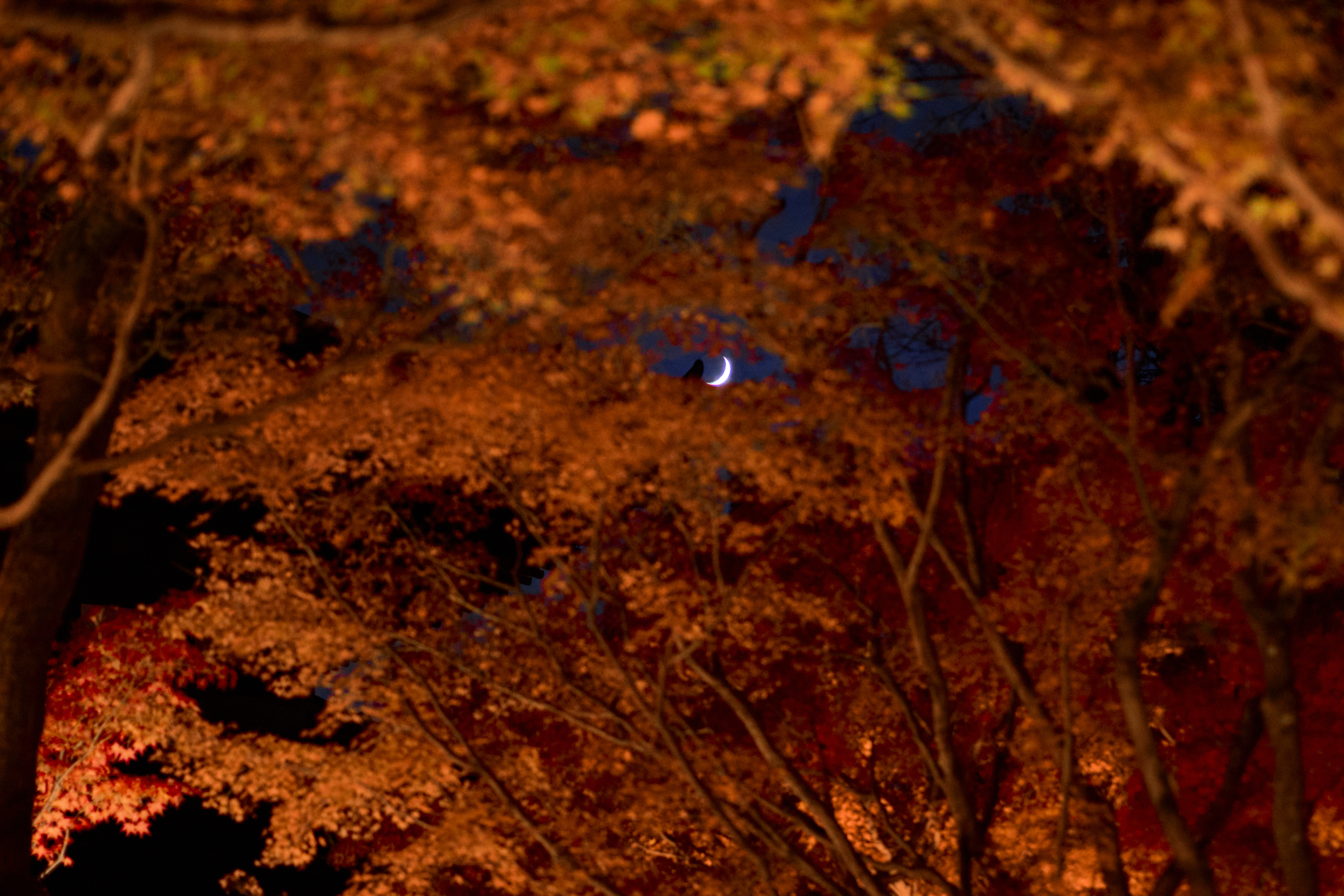
A crescent moon peeks through the autumn foliage canopy

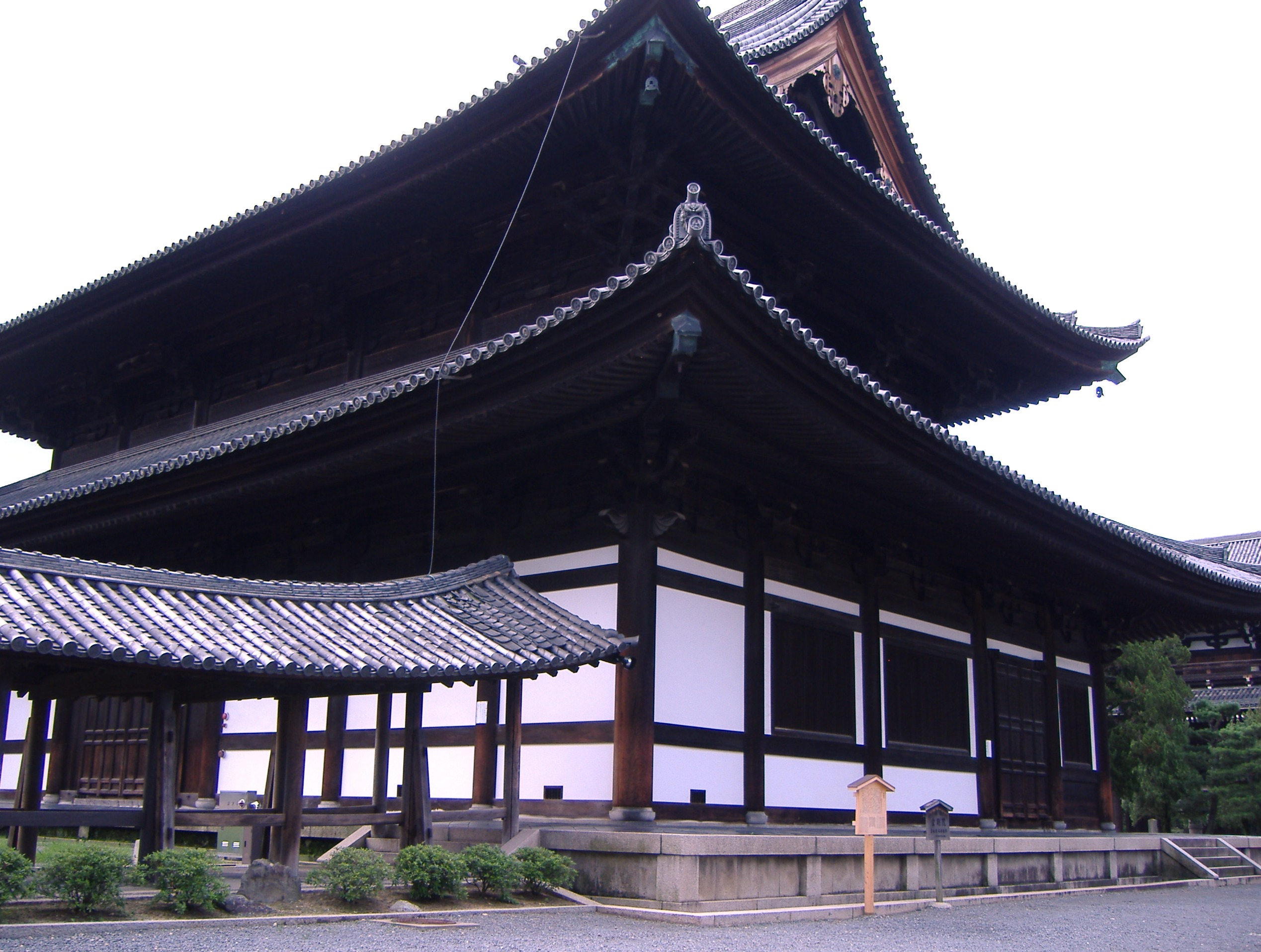
Main hall

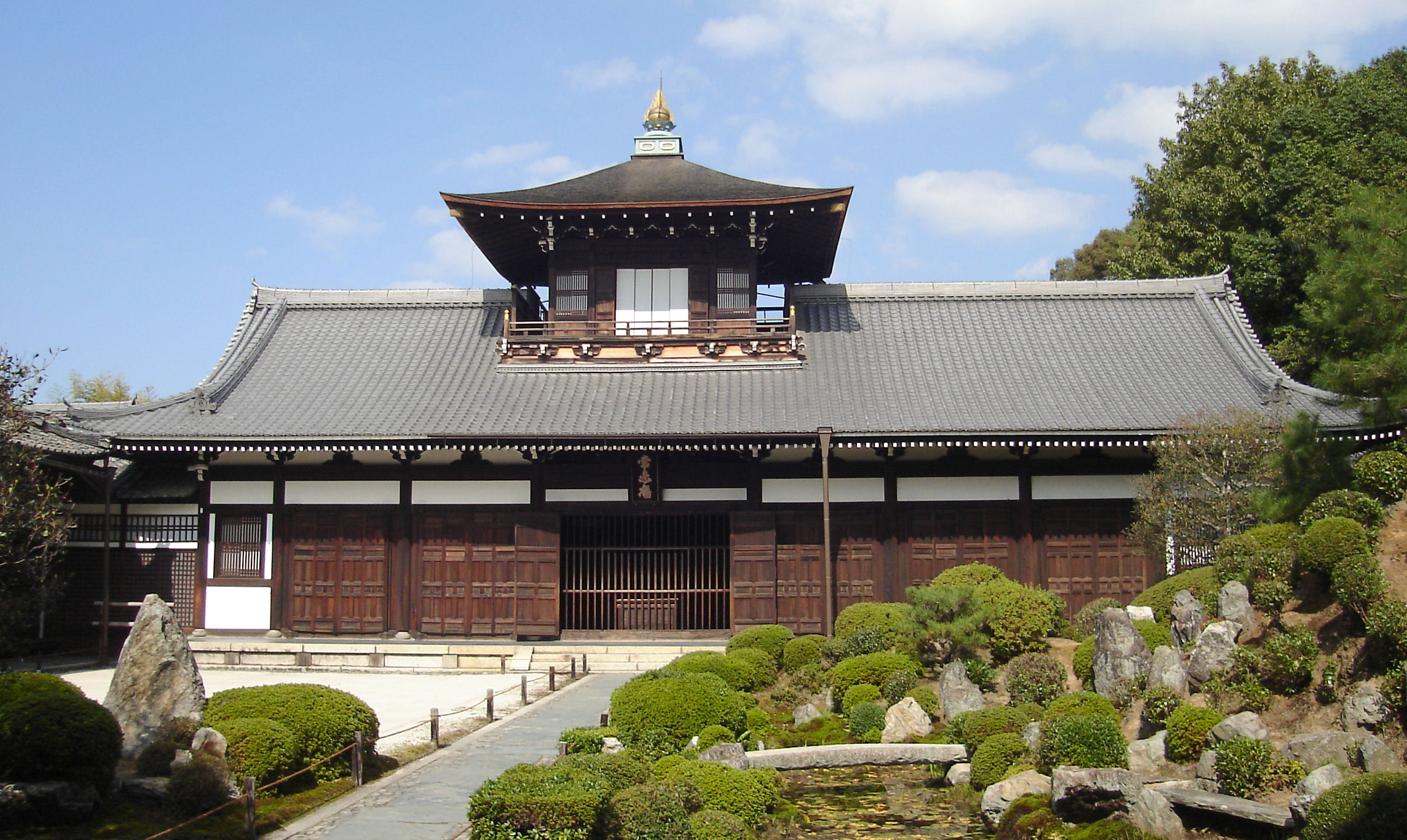
Kaizandō

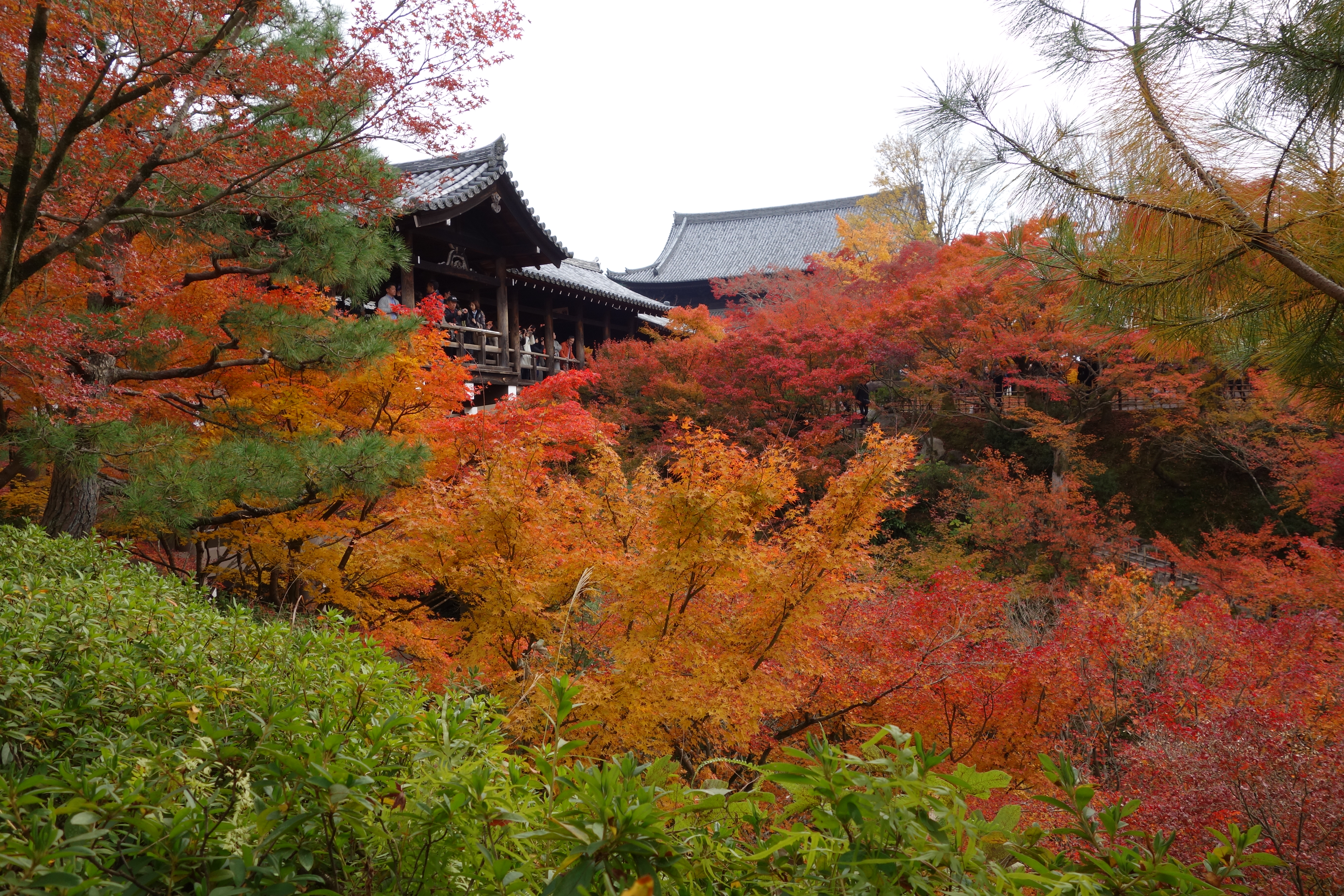
Maple trees in autumn foliage around Tsūten-kyō

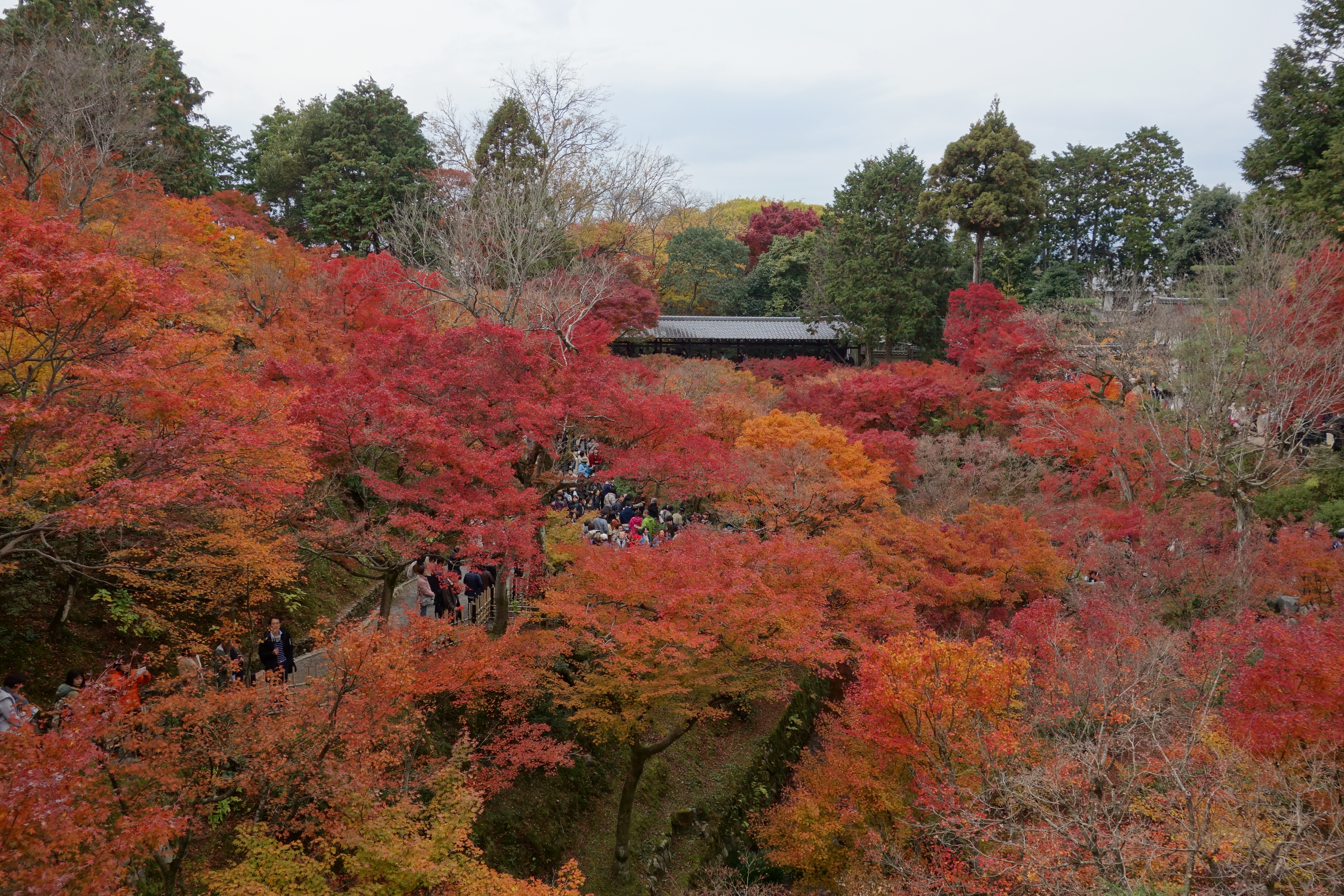
View of maple trees from Tsūten-kyō

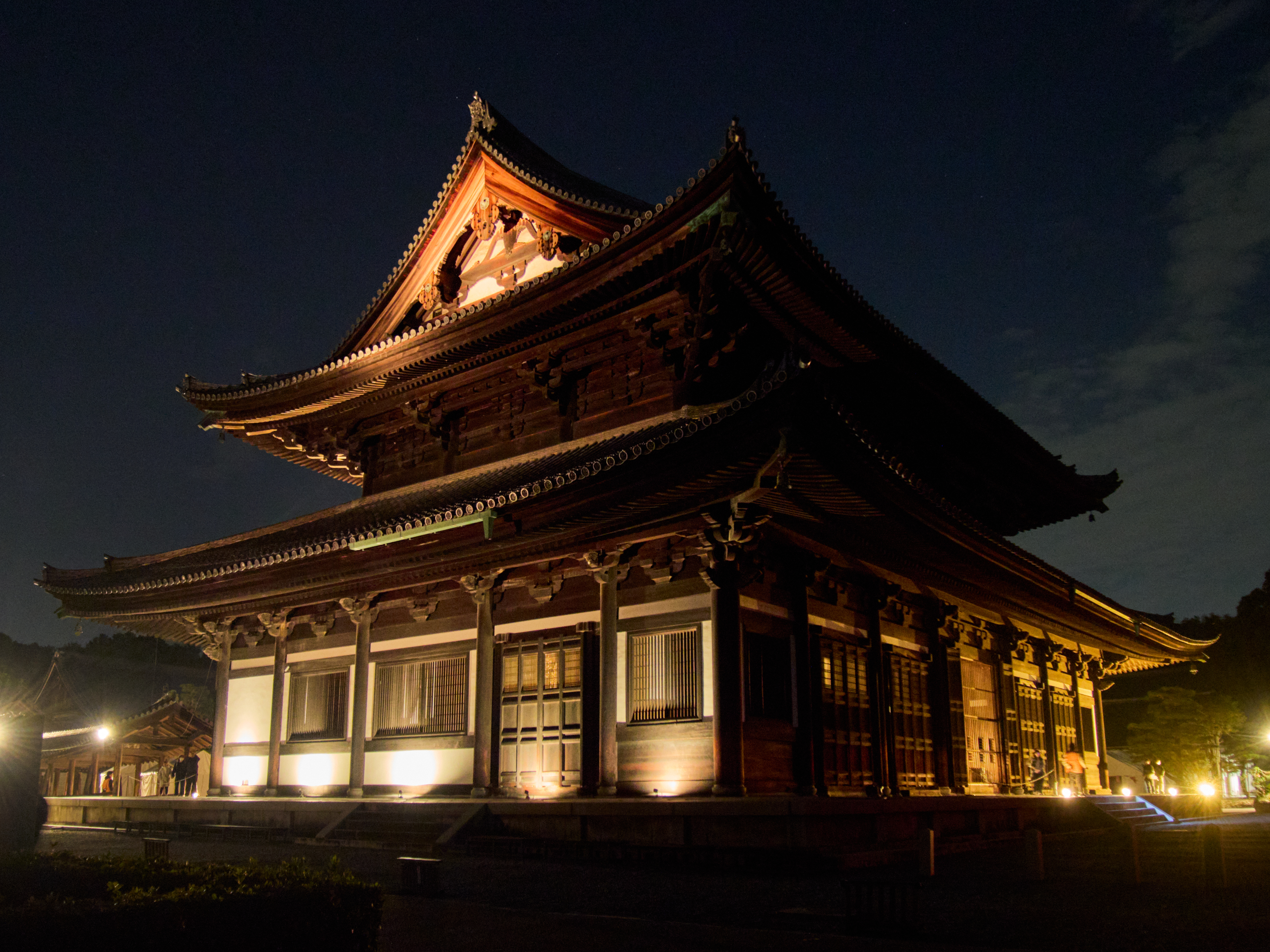
The main hall (Hatto) of Tofuku-ji temple illuminated at night.

== Shinan Ship ==
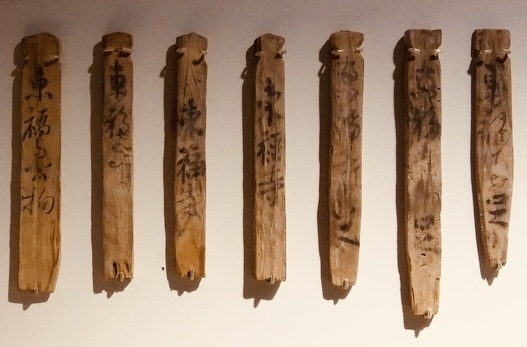
Wooden Tags(木間) from the Shinan Shipwreck, ALL with Tofuku-ji(東福寺) Inscriptions

As mentioned in the "History" section of this article, Tōfuku-ji temple was severely damaged and partly destroyed by fires during the second and third decades of the 14th century. It was specifically in response to a fire damage in 1319 that a merchant ship was sent to Yuan China in 1323 to replace damaged artifacts and to obtain special construction materials for the reconstruction. The ship that now is known as Shinan ship, sailed from Ningbo to Hakata. The early 14th century journey was never completed though as the ship with its 200 tons of cargo was caught in a storm and sank close to Korean shores. This became apparent only after the wreckage was found almost seven hundred years later in 1975 close to the Shinan Islands. On many of the "wooden tablets" or "wooden tags"(木間) that were used customarily to identify the cargo, the Chinese calligraphy characters of Tōfuku-ji(東福寺) temple could be clearly read. Miraculously her passengers, some (or many) of them Japanese Buddhist monks, as recorded by the Korean annals Goryeosa, drifted ashore sound and safe. We can also find records of this unfavorable but overall lucky incident in the personal notes of zen monk-poet Daichi Zenji(大智禅師) who happened to be one of the repatriated passengers.

== See also ==
- Zen
- Enni
- Wuzhun Shifan
- List of Buddhist temples
- List of Buddhist temples in Kyoto
- List of National Treasures of Japan (temples)
- List of National Treasures of Japan (paintings)
- List of National Treasures of Japan (writings)
