= Ryōan Keigo =

Japanese monk and diplomat (1425–1514)

Ryōan Keigo (了庵桂悟; 1425–1514) was a Japanese Zen Buddhist monk and diplomat in the Muromachi period. He was the chief envoy of a 1511–1513 mission sent by the Ashikaga shogunate to the court of the Zhengde Emperor in Beijing.

== Tofuku-ji abbot ==
In 1486, the Rinzai monk Keigo was the 171st abbot of the Tofuku-ji monastery when the honorific title "Ryōan" was conferred by Emperor Go-Tsuchimikado. He was already considered famous when he was designated by Ashikaga Yoshizumi to lead the 1511 mission to China; and Yoshizumi conferred the further honorific title "Butsunichi Zenji," perhaps with the intention of impressing the Chinese.

== Mission to China ==
The economic benefit of the Sinocentric tribute system was profitable trade. The tally trade (kangō bōeki or kanhe maoyi in Chinese) involved exchanges of Japanese products for Chinese goods. The Chinese "tally" was a certificate issued by the Ming. The first 100 such tallies were conveyed to Japan in 1404. Only those with this formal proof of Imperial permission represented by the document were officially allowed to travel and trade within the boundaries of China; and only those diplomatic missions presenting authentic tallies were received as legitimate ambassadors.

Year	Sender	Envoys	Chinese monarch	Comments
1511-1513	Yoshitane	Keigo	Zhengde	Party of 600; returned with Zhengde tallies; returned leftover tallies from the Jingtai and Chenghua eras.

== Selected works ==
- Goroku
- Jinshin nyūmin ki

== See also ==
- Japanese missions to Ming China
