= Sinocentrism =

Worldview centred on or biased towards Chinese civilisation

- Traditional Chinese: 中國中心主義
- Simplified Chinese: 中国中心主义
- Literal meaning: China-centric doctrine
Transcriptions
Standard Mandarin
- Hanyu Pinyin: Zhōngguó zhōngxīn zhǔyì
- Bopomofo: ㄓㄨㄥ ㄍㄨㄛˊ ㄓㄨㄥ ㄒㄧㄣ ㄓㄨˇ ㄧˋ
- Wade–Giles: Chung1-kuo2 chung1-hsin1 jih-yi4
Hakka
- Pha̍k-fa-sṳ: Chung-ke̍t Chung-sîm Chú-ngi
Yue: Cantonese
- Jyutping: Zung1 Gwok3 Zung1 Sam1 Zyu2 Ji6
Southern Min
- Hokkien POJ: Tiong-kok Tiong-sim Chú-gī
- Tâi-lô: Tiong-kok Tiong-sim Tsú-gī

Sinocentrism refers to a worldview that China is the cultural, political, or economic center of the world. Sinocentrism was a core concept in various Chinese dynasties. The Chinese considered themselves to be "all-under-Heaven", ruled by the emperor, known as Son of Heaven. Those that lived outside the Huaxia were regarded as "barbarians". In addition, states outside China, such as Vietnam, Japan or Korea, were considered to be vassals of China.

== Overview and context ==
Depending on the historical context, Sinocentrism can refer to either the ethnocentrism of the Han society and culture, or the modern concept of zhonghua minzu, popular among the Korean elites up to the final demise of the Qing dynasty. The concept came to an end in the 19th century and suffered several more blows in the 20th century, and as a result is not as widely popular among Chinese people in the present day.

In pre-modern times, it often took the form of viewing China as the most advanced civilization in the world, and external ethnic groups or foreign nations as being uncivilized to various degrees, a distinction known in Chinese as the Hua–Yi distinction.

== Sinocentric system ==
Zhou dynasty cosmography of Huaxia and the Siyi: Dongyi in the east, Nanman in the south, Xirong in the west, and Beidi in the north.

The Sinocentric system was a hierarchical system of international relations that prevailed in East Asia before the adoption of the Westphalian system in modern times. Surrounding states such as Japan (which cut off its vassal relationship with China during the Asuka period, because it regarded itself as an equal and individual culture), Korea, the Ryukyu Kingdom, and Vietnam were regarded as vassals of China. Relations between the Chinese Empire and these peoples were interpreted as tributary relationships under which these countries offered tributes to the Emperor of China. Areas not under Sinocentric influence were called Huawai zhi di (化外之地; "lands outside civilization").

At the center of the system stood China, ruled by a dynasty that had gained the Mandate of Heaven. This "Celestial Dynasty", distinguished by its Confucian codes of morality and propriety, regarded itself as the most prominent civilization in the world; the Emperor of China was considered the only legitimate emperor of the entire world (all lands under heaven).

Under this scheme of international relations, only China could use the title of emperor whereas other states were ruled by kings. Chinese emperors were considered the Son of Heaven. The Japanese use of the term Tennō (天皇; "heavenly sovereign") for the rulers of Japan was a subversion of this principle. Throughout history, Koreans have sometimes referred to their rulers as king, conforming with traditional Korean belief of the Posterity of Heaven.

Identification of the heartland and the legitimacy of dynastic succession were both essential aspects of the system. Originally the center was synonymous with the Zhongyuan, an area that was expanded through invasion and conquest over many centuries. The dynastic succession was at times subject to radical changes in interpretation, such as the period of the Southern Song when the ruling dynasty lost the traditional heartland to the northern barbarians. Outside the center were several concentric circles. Local ethnic minorities were not regarded as "foreign countries". But they were governed by their native leaders called tusi, subject to recognition by the Chinese court, and were exempt from the Chinese bureaucratic system.

Outside this circle were the tributary states which offered tributes to the Chinese emperor and over which China exercised suzerainty. Under the Ming dynasty, when the tribute system entered its peak, these states were classified into a number of groups. The southeastern barbarians (category one) included some of the major states of East Asia and Southeast Asia, such as Korea, Japan, the Ryukyu Kingdom, Vietnam, Thailand, Champa, and Java. A second group of southeastern barbarians covered countries like Sulu, Malacca, and Sri Lanka. Many of these are independent states in modern times.

The situation was complicated by the fact that some tributary states had their own tributaries. Laos was a tributary of Vietnam while the Ryukyu Kingdom paid tribute to both China and Japan. Tsushima Island was also a tributary of the Goryeo and Joseon dynasties of Korea.

Beyond the circle of tributary states were countries in a trading relationship with China. The Portuguese, for instance, were allowed to trade with China from leased territory in Macau but did not officially enter the tributary system. During the Qing dynasty's rule of Taiwan, some Qing officials have used the term Huawai zhi di to refer to Taiwan (Formosa), specifically to areas in Taiwan that have yet to be fully cultivated, developed and under the control of the Qing government.

While Sinocentrism tends to be identified as a politically inspired system of international relations, in fact it possessed an important economic aspect. The Sinocentric tribute and trade system provided Northeast and Southeast Asia with a political and economic framework for international trade. Countries wishing to trade with China were required to submit to a suzerain-vassal relationship with the Chinese sovereign. After investiture (冊封; cèfēng) of the ruler in question, the missions were allowed to come to China to pay tribute to the Chinese emperor. In exchange, tributary missions were presented with return bestowals (回賜; huícì). Special licences were issued to merchants accompanying these missions to carry out trade. Trade was also permitted at land frontiers and specified ports. This Sinocentric trade zone was based on the use of silver as a currency with prices set by reference to Chinese prices.

The Sinocentric model was not seriously challenged until contact with the European powers in the 18th and 19th century, in particular after the First Opium War. This was partly due to the fact that sustained contact between the Chinese Empire and other empires of the pre-modern period was limited. By the mid 19th century, imperial China was well past its peak and was on the verge of collapse.

In the late 19th century, the Sinocentric tributary state system in East Asia was superseded by the Westphalian multi-state system.

== Responses of other countries ==
Within Asia, the cultural and economic centrality of China was recognized, and most countries submitted to the Sinocentric model, if only to enjoy the benefits of a trading relationship. However, clear differences of nuance can be discerned in the responses of different countries.

=== Korea ===
Until the era of the Three Kingdoms of Korea, Southern Korean states had been protected from Chinese invasions by militarily powerful Northern Korean states such as Goguryeo which ruled the northern region of Korean peninsula and Manchuria. Goguryeo considered itself as an equally supreme state as China and adopted its own centric system to adjacent countries as shown through its Korean imperial titles. Refusing to pay any tributes and continuing to conquer eastern territories of China altogether incurred a series of massive Chinese invasions of Goguryeo from 598 to 614, which ended disastrously, and they mainly contributed to the fall of Chinese Sui dynasty in 618. Such numerous defeats of the Chinese raised the sense of ethnic superiority in Goguryeo and further expansions into the Chinese territories continued.

After Goguryeo was collapsed by the allied forces of Silla, one of the Three Kingdoms of Korea, and the Tang dynasty in 668, Silla, now being the sole ruler of Korean peninsula, more readily started the tribute system between Silla and Tang. However, such ties between two countries were weakened after Silla's submission to Goryeo who claimed to succeed Goguryeo.

In the mid-Goryeo period, Korea idealized the Song dynasty and actively sought cultural assimilation into the Sinosphere. The relationship continued until the Mongol invasions of Korea and the Mongol conquest of the Song Dynasty where the two kingdoms fell, leading to the rise of the Yuan dynasty. After 30 years of fierce resistance, both Goryeo and Mongols finally sued for peace and Goryeo became a dependency of the Yuan dynasty. Soon after the weakening of Yuan dynasty, Goryeo retook their lost territories from the Yuan dynasty by military campaigns and regained her sovereign rights.

The Joseon dynasty (1392–1910) encouraged the entrenchment of Korean Confucian ideals and doctrines in Korean society and again willingly entered into the Sinocentric system. After the Ming dynasty, which regarded itself as huá (華), cultured civilization was considered to have collapsed under the invasion of the Qing, where the dominant Manchus were considered barbarian (夷) by Koreans. The Ming was thought of as the last true Sino culture (中華).

Sinocentrism waned further after Britain militarily defeated Qing China in the Second Opium War, creating an influx of Western culture with the decline of the Qing dynasty. Some Koreans especially those who studied abroad saw a need for reforms and associated Western civilization with modernization.

=== Vietnam ===
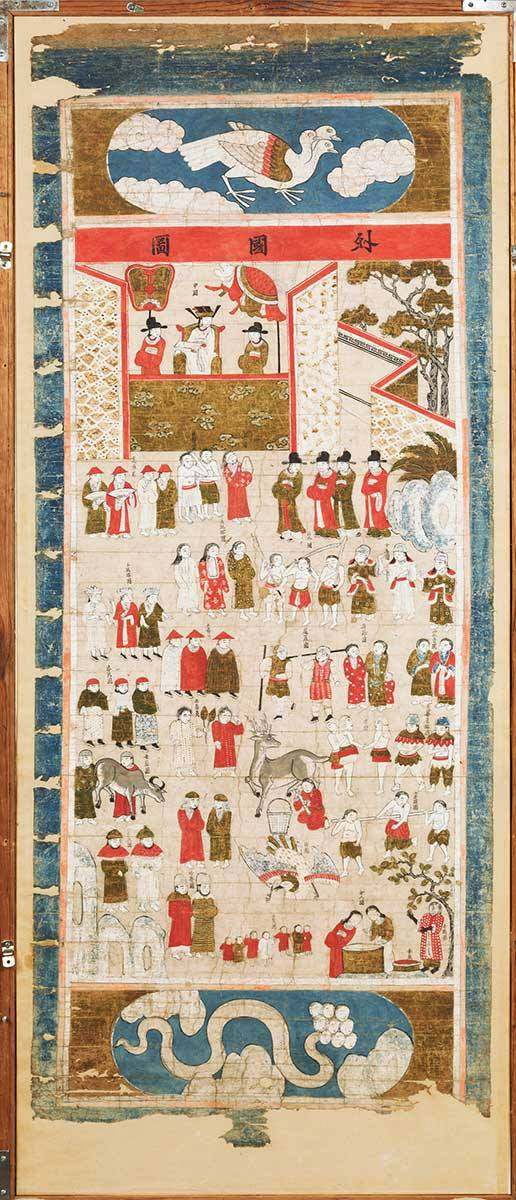
The Painting of Foreign Countries (外國圖) in the 18th century with Revival Lê dynasty as "middle state" (中國).

Vietnam (Đại Việt) had an intimate but not always peaceful relationship with China. Vietnam, originally independent, was part of various Chinese dynasties and kingdoms for approximately 900 years before gaining independence in the 10th century. In subsequent centuries the Vietnamese drove out Chinese invaders on a number of occasions, to the extent that conflict with China may be seen as one of the main themes of Vietnamese history.

However, Vietnam was also heavily Sinicized, adopting most aspects of Chinese culture, including the administrative system, architecture, philosophy, religion, literature of China, and even a general cultural outlook. Classical Chinese (Chữ Hán) was adopted as national writing system since the Triệu dynasty. Vietnamese merchants along with Chinese merchants had the important roles in spreading of Hanzi and Confucianism to the world. First Vietnamese reached the Persian shores in the late 1st century. Vietnam persistently identified itself in relation to China, regarding itself as the kingdom of the south as against China in the north, as seen in this line from a poem (in Classical Chinese) by General Lý Thường Kiệt (李常傑) (1019–1105): Nam Quốc sơn hà Nam Đế cư. (南國山河南帝居), which means "Over mountains and rivers of the South reigns the Emperor of the South".

In adopting Chinese customs, the Vietnamese court also began to adopt Sinocentric world view during the expanding Later Lê and Nguyễn dynasties. "Trung Quốc" 中國 was used as a name for Vietnam by Emperor Gia Long in 1805. It was said "Hán di hữu hạn" 漢夷有限 ("the Vietnamese and the barbarians must have clear borders") by the Gia Long Emperor (Nguyễn Phúc Ánh) when differentiating between Khmer and Vietnamese. Minh Mang implemented an acculturation integration policy directed at minority non-Vietnamese peoples. Thanh nhân 清人 was used to refer to ethnic Chinese by the Vietnamese while Vietnamese called themselves as Hán nhân 漢人 in Vietnam during the 1800s under Nguyễn rule. Cambodia was regularly called Cao Man Quốc (高蠻國), the country of "upper barbarians". In 1815, Gia Long claimed 13 countries as Vietnamese vassals, including Luang Prabang, Vientiane, Burma, Tran Ninh in eastern Laos, and two countries called "Thủy Xá Quốc" and "Hỏa Xá Quốc", which were actually Malayo-Polynesian Jarai tribes living between Vietnam and Cambodia. Mirroring the Chinese model, the Vietnamese court attempted to regulate the presentation of tribute to the Vietnamese court, participation in New Year and emperor's birthday ceremonies, as well as the travel routes and size of tributary missions.

Vietnamese Nguyen Emperor Minh Mạng sinicized ethnic minorities such as Khmer and Cham, claimed the legacy of Confucianism and China's Han dynasty for Vietnam, and used the term Han people 漢人 (Hán nhân) to refer to the Vietnamese. Minh Mang declared that "We must hope that their barbarian habits will be subconsciously dissipated, and that they will daily become more infected by Han [Sino-Vietnamese] customs." These policies were directed at the Khmer and hill tribes. The Nguyen lord Nguyen Phuc Chu had referred to Vietnamese as "Han people" in 1712 when differentiating between Vietnamese and Chams. The Nguyen Lords established đồn điền after 1790. It was said "Hán di hữu hạn" 漢夷有限 ("the Vietnamese and the barbarians must have clear borders") by the Gia Long Emperor (Nguyễn Phúc Ánh) when differentiating between Khmer and Vietnamese. Minh Mang implemented an acculturation integration policy directed at minority non-Vietnamese peoples. Thanh nhân 清人 or Đường nhân 唐人 were used to refer to ethnic Chinese by the Vietnamese while Vietnamese called themselves as Hán dân 漢民 and Hán nhân 漢人 in Vietnam during the 1800s under Nguyễn rule.

Chinese style clothing was forced on Vietnamese people by the Nguyễn. Trousers have been adopted by White H'mong. The trousers replaced the traditional skirts of the females of the White Hmong. The tunics and trouser clothing of the Han Chinese on the Ming tradition was worn by the Vietnamese. The Áo dài was created when tucks which were close fitting and compact were added in the 1920s to this Chinese style. Trousers and tunics on the Chinese pattern in 1774 were ordered by the Nguyễn Phúc Khoát to replace the sarong type Vietnamese clothing. The Chinese clothing in the form of trousers and tunic were mandated by the Vietnamese Nguyen government. It was up to the 1920s in Vietnam's north area in isolated hamlets wear skirts were worn. The Chinese Qin and Han dynasty state clothing was ordered to be adopted by Vietnamese military and bureaucrats since Vietnam under Triệu rule Triệu Đà (179 BC).

Chinese influence waned as French influence rose in the 19th century, and Vietnam eventually abolished the Imperial examinations and stopped using Chữ Hán and the related Chữ Nôm script in the 20th century in official.

=== Japan ===
In Japan, an ambivalent tone was set early in its relationship with China. Shōtoku Taishi (574–622), Prince Regent of Japan, is famous for having sent a letter to the Emperor of China starting with the words: "The Emperor of the land where the sun rises sends a letter to the Emperor of the land where the sun sets to ask if you are healthy" (日出處天子致書日沒處天子無恙云云). This is commonly believed as the origin of the name Nihon (source of the sun), although the actual characters for Nihon (日本) were not used.

Not long after this, however, Japan remodeled its entire state and administrative apparatus on the Chinese system under the Taika Reform (645), the beginning of a period of Chinese influence on many aspects of Japanese culture until Imperial Japanese embassies to China were abolished in 894.

In 1401, during the Muromachi period (室町時代), the shōgun Yoshimitsu (足利義満) restarted the lapsed tribute system (1401), describing himself in a letter to the Chinese Emperor as "Your subject, the King of Japan" while also a subject of the Japanese Emperor. The benefit of the tribute system was a profitable trade. The trade was called Kangō trade (means tally trade) and Japanese products were traded for Chinese goods. This relationship ended with the last envoy of Japanese monk Sakugen Shūryō in 1551, which was Ashikaga Yoshiteru's era, including a 20 years suspension by Ashikaga Yoshimochi. These embassies were sent to China on 19 occasions.

During the Mongol-led Yuan dynasty of China, Japan thought of China as no longer a genuine Chinese land. Subsequently, Japan often used the names "China" and "Huaxia" to refer to itself.

In the years 1592–1593, Toyotomi Hideyoshi, having unified Japan, tried to conquer Korea as a prelude to conquering Ming China. The attempt to conquer "all under heaven" (itself a sinocentric concept identifying China as "the world") ended in failure.

Japanese responses to Sinocentric concepts have not always been so straightforward. The Mongol invasions in 1274 and 1281 evoked a national consciousness of the role of the kamikaze (神風) in defeating the enemy. Less than fifty years later (1339–43), Kitabatake Chikafusa wrote the Jinnō Shōtōki (神皇正統記, 'Chronicle of the Direct Descent of the Divine Sovereigns') emphasizing the divine descent of the imperial line. The Jinnō Shōtōki provided a Shinto view of history stressing the divine nature of Japan and its spiritual supremacy over China and India.

In the Tokugawa era, the study of Kokugaku (国学) arose as an attempt to reconstruct and recover the authentic native roots of Japanese culture, particularly Shinto, excluding later elements borrowed from China. In 1657, Tokugawa Mitsukuni established the Mito School, which was charged with writing a history of Japan as a perfect exemplar of a "nation" under Confucian thought, with the emphasis on unified rule by the emperors and respect for the imperial court and Shinto deities.

In an ironic affirmation of the spirit of Sinocentrism, claims were even heard that the Japanese, not the Chinese, were the legitimate heirs of Chinese culture. Reasons included that the Imperial House of Japan never died out comparing to the rise and fall of Chinese monarchs in the past, and that Japan was free of barbarism like Qing dynasty's forced adoption of Manchu queue and clothing on Han Chinese after 1644. Combined with Shinto, came the concept of "Shinkoku/the Divine Kingdom (神國). In the early Edo period, neo-Confucianist Yamaga Sokō asserted that Japan was superior to China in Confucian terms and more deserving of the name "Chūgoku". Other scholars picked this up, notably Aizawa Seishisai, an adherent of the Mito School, in his political tract Shinron (新論 New Theses) in 1825.

As a country that had much to gain by eclipsing Chinese power in East Asia, Japan in more recent times has perhaps been most ardent in identifying and demolishing what it dismissively calls Chūka shisō (中華思想), loosely meaning "Zhonghua ideology". One manifestation of Japanese resistance to Sinocentrism was the insistence for many years in the early 20th century on using the name Shina (支那) for China, based on the Western word 'China', in preference to Chūgoku (中国 Central Country) advocated by the Chinese themselves.

=== Burma ===
Unlike East Asian states, which communicated in written Chinese, Burma used a different written language in its communications with China. While China consistently regarded Burma as a vassal, Burmese records indicate that Burma considered itself as China's equal. Under the Burmese interpretation, Burma was the "younger brother" and China was the "elder brother".

=== Thailand ===
Thailand was subordinate to China as a tributary state from the Sui dynasty until the Taiping Rebellion of the late Qing dynasty in the mid-19th century. The Sukhothai Kingdom established official relations with the Yuan dynasty during the reign of King Ram Khamhaeng. Wei Yuan, the 19th century Chinese scholar, considered Thailand to be the strongest and most loyal of China's Southeast Asian tributaries, citing the time when Thailand offered to directly attack Japan to divert the Japanese in their planned invasions of Korea and the Asian mainland, as well as other acts of loyalty to the Ming dynasty. Thailand was welcoming and open to Chinese immigrants, who dominated commerce and trade, and achieved high positions in the government.

=== Sri Lanka ===
The last Sri Lankan kingdom, the Kingdom of Kandy (1469–1815), did not establish any significant relationships with imperial China. However, the preceding Kotte kingdom (1412–1597) had significant interactions with Ming China. Parakramabahu VI of Kotte, the founder of Kotte, established a significant alliance with Ming China during his reign, resulting in noteworthy political and economic consequences for the region. This alliance led to the removal of Vira Alakesvara of Gampola from the throne in favor of Parakramabahu VI, with documented details found in Chinese records.

Historical accounts reveal that Parakramabahu VI's legitimacy was fortified through a selection process at the Ming court. He was nominated by the Yongle Ming emperor and subsequently installed into power by Admiral Zheng He. This transition was ensured by the commanding presence of Zheng He's formidable fleet. This collaboration marked the beginning of an era characterized by increased economic interaction between the Ming dynasty and the Kotte kingdom. To strengthen these relations, Parakramabahu VI initiated several diplomatic missions, totaling at least five, to China. These missions aimed to affirm the cessation of sea piracy within the Sea of Kotte.

A notable legacy of Parakramabahu VI's reign is attributed to Admiral Zheng He, who made a lasting impact on Sri Lanka. This is exemplified by the installation of the Galle Trilingual inscription, serving as an artifact that attests to the interactions between the two nations during this historical period. Sri Lanka, like Japan, was considered yuanyi (remote foreigners; 遠夷) in jueyu (remote territories; 絕域) under the Imperial Chinese Tributary System.

=== Europe ===
One of the most historically well-known official encounter between Sinocentric attitudes and Europeans was the Macartney Embassy of 1792–93, which sought to establish a permanent British presence in Peking and establish official trade relations. The rejection of the Chinese Emperor to the British overtures and the British refusal to kowtow to the Emperor has passed into legend in British and Chinese folklore. In response to the British request to recognise Macartney as official ambassador, the Emperor wrote:

Swaying the wide world, I have but one aim in view, namely, to maintain a perfect governance and to fulfil the duties of the State ... I set no value on objects strange or ingenious, and have no use for your country's manufactures. This then is my answer to your request to appoint a representative at my Court, a request contrary to our dynastic usage, which could only result in inconvenience to yourself.

== Cultural Sinocentrism ==
In a cultural sense, Sinocentrism can refer to the tendency among both Chinese and foreigners to regard the culture of China as more ancient than or superior to other cultures. This often involves regarding neighboring countries as mere cultural offshoots of China. The geographical dimension of traditional Sinocentrism was highlighted by Chinese reactions to the publication of the first world map by the Jesuit missionary Matteo Ricci (1552–1610):

Lately Matteo Ricci used some false teachings to fool people, and scholars unanimously believed him...The Map of the World which he made contains elements of the fabulous and mysterious, and is a down right attempt to deceive people on things which they personally cannot go to verify for themselves...We need not discuss other points, but just take for example the position of China on the map. He puts it not in the center but slightly to the West and inclined to the north. This is altogether far from the truth, for China should be in the center of the world, which we can prove by the single fact that we can see the North Star resting at the zenith of the heaven at midnight.

In the late Ming and Qing dynasties, there was a belief in Chinese cultural circles that knowledge entering China from the West had already existed in China in the past. This trend of thought was known in Chinese as xi xue zhong yuan (Chinese: 西學中源; pinyin: Xīxué Zhōng yuán; lit. 'Western knowledge has Chinese origins'). Xi xue zhong yuan was a way to not only enhance the prestige of ancient Chinese learning, but also that of Western learning and make it more acceptable to the Chinese at that time.

One notable example was Chouren Zhuan (Chinese: 疇人傳; pinyin: Chóurén zhuàn; lit. 'Biographies of Astronomers and Mathematicians'), a book by the Qing dynasty scholar Ruan Yuan which adopted the point of view that some Western sciences had an ancient Chinese origin. Scholars such as Ruan saw astronomy and mathematics as a key to deciphering the ancient classics. Until the Sino-Japanese War, some intellectuals believed that some of the sciences and technologies coming from Europe were actually lost ancient Chinese knowledge. The Chinese have abandoned the idea of xi xue zhong yuan since the early 20th century.

Cultural Sinocentrism was the political and cultural core of the region: traditional Chinese language and writing system, ideological frames of the Confucian social and familial order; legal and administrative systems; Buddhism and the art of historiography were used in China, the Korean Peninsula (Korean Confucianism) and also Vietnam.

=== Indigenous criticism ===
Followers of Chinese Buddhism were some of the fiercest critics of Sinocentrism, since they followed a religion that originated in India, rather than China. The monk Zhiyi (538–597 CE) referred to China as "Zhendan" (震旦; Zhèndàn), rather than by any epithet for China that emphasized China's centrality, such as Zhōngguó (the modern name of China, 中國; 中国; Zhōngguó) or Zhonghua (中華; 中华; Zhōnghuá). "Zhendan" originated in a transcription of the Sanskrit word for China, चीनस्थान, cīnasthāna. Another anti-Sinocentric name for China used by Buddhists was "country of the Han" (漢國; 汉国; Hàn-guó) or "region of the Han". Reacting to an insecurity against China's indigenous religions of Confucianism and Daoism, Buddhists in China asserted that Confucius and Yan Hui were avatars of the Buddha, and that Confucianism was merely an offshoot of Buddhism. When Buddhists had influence in the court, such as in the minority-led Yuan dynasty, they successfully persuaded the imperial governments to censor and destroy Daoist texts. They especially hated the Huahujing, which made the opposite argument to that of the Buddhists; that Buddhism was an offshoot of Daoism.

Liu Ji, one of the key advisors of the Ming-dynasty founder Zhu Yuanzhang, generally supported the idea that while the Chinese and the non-Chinese are different, they are actually equal. Liu was therefore arguing against the idea that the Chinese were and are superior to other people.

Culturally, one of the most famous attacks on Sinocentrism and its associated beliefs was made by the author Lu Xun in The True Story of Ah Q, in which the protagonist is humiliated and defeated; satirizing the ridiculous way in which he claimed "spiritual victories" in spite of this.

== Today ==
The influence of the Sinocentric model of political relations and Sinocentric belief in cultural superiority (especially against the West) declined in the 19th century. The Sinocentric ideology suffered a further blow when Imperial Japan, having undergone the Meiji Restoration, defeated China in the First Sino-Japanese War. As a result, China adopted the Westphalian system of equal independent states.

In modern Chinese foreign policy, the People's Republic of China has repeatedly stated that it will never seek to establish hegemony beyond its borders (Chinese: 永不称霸). However, some historians, such as John Friend and Bradley Thayer believe there are individuals in the Chinese government who doggedly hold onto Sinocentric beliefs. Chinese Communist Party (CCP) general secretary Xi Jinping has called for a 'pan-Asian security concept', which has been compared to Imperial Japan by commentators. Historian Steve Tsang states that the CCP's concept of "Community of Common Destiny" presumes a Sinocentric vision of tianxia over and above the liberal international order.

== Related concepts ==
Successive peoples from the north, such as the Xianbei, Jurchens, Mongols, or Manchus, were quite willing to place themselves at the center of the model, although they were not always successful. The Xianbei empires during the Northern and Southern dynasties, for example, regarded the Han regimes of southern China as "barbarians" because they refused to submit to Xianbei rule. Similarly, the Manchu-led Qing dynasty regarded the Westerners they encountered in the mid-19th century as "barbarians" due to their "uncouth manners".

Sinocentrism is not synonymous with Chinese nationalism. The successive dynasties in China's history were Sinocentric in the sense that they regarded Chinese civilization to be universal in its reach and application. Chinese nationalism, in contrast, is a more modern concept (nationalism) focused primarily on the idea of a unified, cohesive, and powerful Chinese nation state, as one of the nations of the world.

== See also ==
- Adoption of Chinese literary culture
- Afrocentrism
- Chinese Century
- Chinese exceptionalism
- Chinese expansionism
- Chinese imperialism
- Emperor at home, king abroad
- Five thousand years of Chinese civilization
- Indocentrism
- Khan of Heaven
- Language Atlas of China
- List of recipients of tribute from China
- List of tributary states of China
- Little China (ideology)
- Pax Sinica
- Secession in China
- Sinology
- Eurocentrism
