= List of cultural properties of Japan – historical materials (Yamaguchi) =

This list is of the cultural properties of Japan designated in the category of historical materials (歴史資料, rekishi shiryō) for the Prefecture of Yamaguchi.

== National Cultural Properties ==
As of 1 September 2020, eight Important Cultural Properties have been designated, being of national significance.

Property	Date	Municipality	Ownership	Comments	Image	Coordinates	Ref.
Items such as seals relating to the tally trade of the Ōuchi clan 大内氏勘合貿易印等関係資料; Ōuchi-shi kangō bōeki in-tō kankei shiryō	Muromachi period	Hōfu	Mōri Museum	5 items		34°03′48″N 131°35′18″E	
Ōuchi Edition Lotus Sūtra Woodblocks 大内版法華経板木; Ōuchi-ban hokekyō hangi	Muromachi period	Yamaguchi	Yamaguchi Prefecture (kept at Yamaguchi Prefectural Archives)	59 woodblocks		34°10′53″N 131°28′35″E	
Ship flag pass Noshima Murakami Family Documents 過所船旗〈天正九年四月廿八日/〉 能島村上家文書 kasho sen-ki Noshima Murakami-ke monjo	C16	Yamaguchi	Yamaguchi Prefectural Archives	199 documents plus 1 flag pass of Tenshō 9 (1581); cf. Japan Heritage "Story" #036		34°10′53″N 131°28′35″E	
Keichō Kuniezu - retained copies of Suō Province & Nagato Province 慶長国絵図〈控図／周防国、長門国〉 Keichō kuniezu (hikaezu / Suō-no-kuni, Nagato-no-kuni)	Edo period	Ube	Ube City (kept at Ube Bunka Kaikan (宇部市文化会館))	2 maps		33°57′28″N 131°14′39″E	
Gifts of the Joseon mission to Japan in Shōtoku 1 (1711) together with a catalogue of these gifts 正徳元年朝鮮通信使進物並進物目録; Shōtoku gannen Chōsen tsūshinshi shinmotsu narabini shinmotsu mokuroku	Edo period	Yamaguchi	Yamaguchi Prefecture (kept at Yamaguchi Prefectural Museum)	106 items		34°10′57″N 131°28′22″E	
Japan-Ming trade ship flag Takasu Family Documents 日明貿易船旗〈万暦十二年十月吉日／（麻布）〉 高洲家文書; Nichi-Min bōeki sen-ki Takasu-ke monjo	1351–1643	Yamaguchi	private (kept at Yamaguchi Prefectural Archives)	117 documents plus 1 flag of Wanli 12 (1584)		34°10′53″N 131°28′35″E	
Earthen-moulded papier-mâché maps of Suō and Nagato Provinces 防長土図; Bōchō dozu	1767	Yamaguchi	Yamaguchi Prefecture (kept at Yamaguchi Prefectural Museum)	109 items; by Arima Kisōta (有馬喜惣太)		34°10′57″N 131°28′22″E	
Administrative documents of Yamaguchi Prefecture 山口県行政文書; Yamaguchi-ken gyōsei bunsho	Edo period to Shōwa era	Yamaguchi	Yamaguchi Prefecture (kept at Yamaguchi Prefectural Archives)	13,549 items		34°10′53″N 131°28′35″E	

== Prefectural Cultural Properties ==
As of 1 May 2020, sixteen properties have been designated at a prefectural level.

Property	Date	Municipality	Ownership	Comments	Image	Coordinates	Ref.
Items relating to Yoshida Shōin (handed down in the Yoshida Family) 吉田松陰関係資料（吉田家伝来） Yoshida Shōin kankei shiryō (Yoshida-ke denrai)	1699–1921	Yamaguchi	Yamaguchi Prefecture (kept at Yamaguchi Prefectural Archives)	754 items including 741 documents and 1 portrait		34°10′53″N 131°28′35″E	
Items relating to Mōri Motonari 毛利元就関係資料; Mōri Motonari kankei shiryō	Muromachi period	Hōfu	Mōri Museum			34°03′48″N 131°35′18″E	
Items relating to Mōri Takamoto 毛利隆元関係資料; Mōri Takamoto kankei shiryō	late Muromachi period	Hōfu	Mōri Museum			34°03′48″N 131°35′18″E	
Items relating to Mōri Terumoto 毛利輝元関係資料; Mōri Terumoto kankei shiryō	Muromachi period to early Edo period	Hōfu	Mōri Museum			34°03′48″N 131°35′18″E	
Items relating to Mōri Hidenari 毛利秀就関係資料; Mōri Hidenari kankei shiryō	early Edo period	Hōfu	Mōri Museum			34°03′48″N 131°35′18″E	

== See also ==
- Cultural Properties of Japan
- List of National Treasures of Japan (historical materials)
- List of Historic Sites of Japan (Yamaguchi)
- List of Cultural Properties of Japan - paintings (Yamaguchi)
