= David Howell =

David Howell may refer to:

== Law and politics ==
- David Howell (British Army officer), British barrister and officer
- David Howell (jurist) (1747–1824), American jurist, Continental Congressman for Rhode Island
- David Howell, Baron Howell of Guildford (born 1936), British Conservative MP, minister in Margaret Thatcher's cabinet

== Religion ==
- David Howell (priest) (1831–1903), Dean of St David's Cathedral, 1897–1903
- David Howell (chaplain) (1929–2017), Anglican priest and writer

== Sport ==
- David Howell (cricketer) (born 1958), South African cricketer
- David Howell (footballer) (born 1958), English footballer and manager
- David Howell (golfer) (born 1975), English professional golfer from Swindon
- David Howell (rugby league) (born 1983), Australian rugby league footballer

== Others ==
- David Howell (historian) (born 1959), American historian of Japan
- David Howell (chess player) (born 1990), English chess grandmaster

== See also ==
- The Edge, real name David Howell Evans, guitarist of U2
