= Nodoka =

- Pronunciation: noʊ-doʊ-kɒ
- Gender: Female

Origin
- Origin: Japanese
- Meaning: Different meanings depending on the kanji used
- Region of origin: Japan

Other names
- Related names: Nonoka; Madoka

Nodoka (のどか, ノドカ) is a Japanese feminine given name.

== Written forms ==
Forms in kanji can include:

- 和, "harmony"
- 暖, "warmth"
- 円, "circle"
- 和香, "harmony, aroma"

== People ==
- Nodoka Harada (原田 のどか; born 1991), Japanese softball player
- Nodoka Tenma (天満 のどか), retired Japanese wrestler
- Nodoka Yamamoto (山本 和佳; born 2002), Japanese freestyle wrestler

== Fictional characters ==
- Nodoka Hanadera (のどか) (also known as Cure Grace), a character from the 2020 anime series Healin' Good Pretty Cure
- Nodoka Haramura (和), a character from the 2006 manga series Saki
- Nodoka Manabe (和), a character from the 2007 manga series K-On!
- Nodoka Miyazaki (のどか), a character from Negima! Magister Negi Magi
- Nodoka Saotome (のどか), a character from Ranma ½

== See also ==
- Nodoka, a theme for the GNOME desktop environment provided as part of the Fedora Linux distribution
