= Ryūsen-zu =

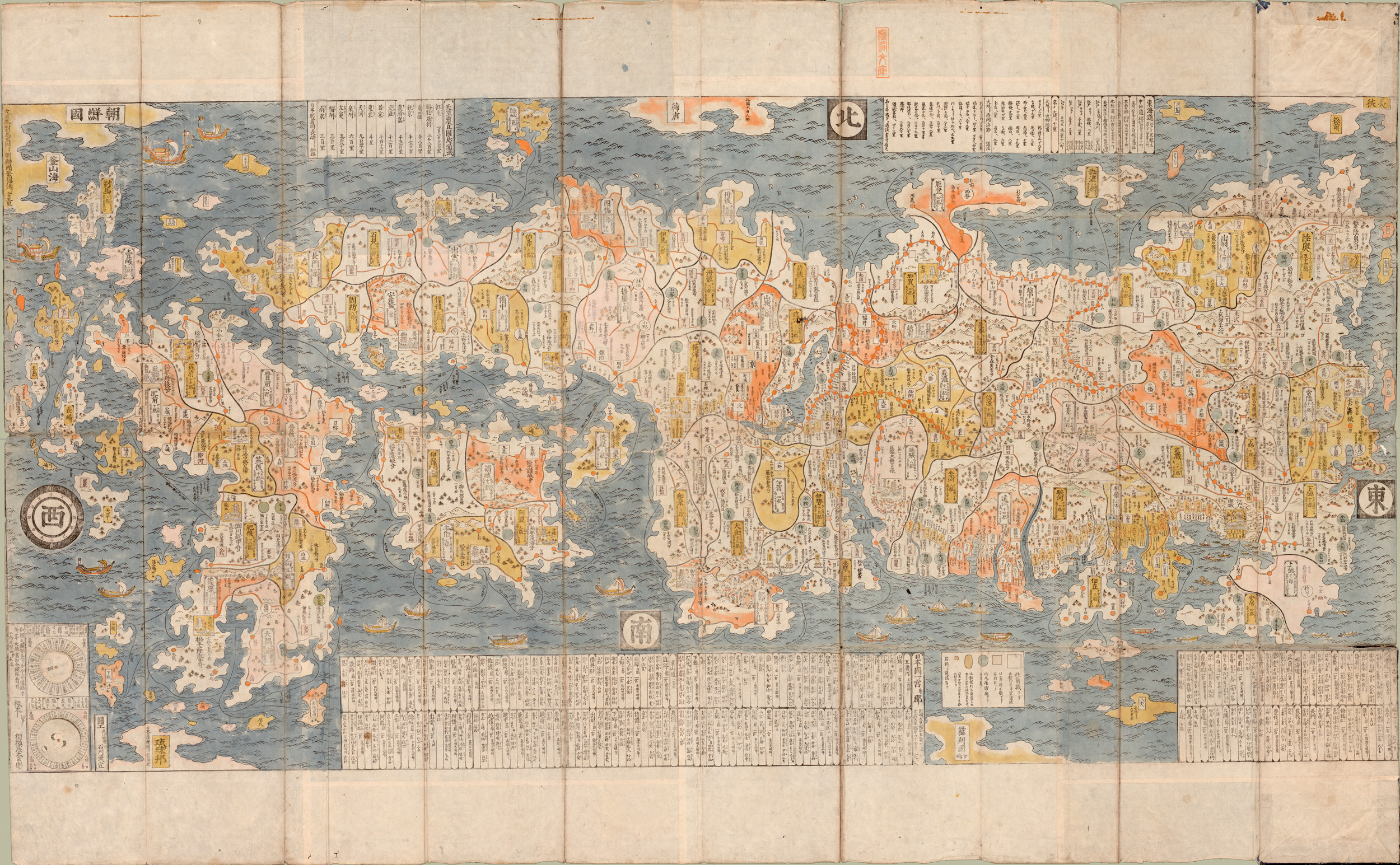
Nihon kaizan chōrikuzu 日本海山潮陸圖, 1691. (UBC Library Open Collections)

Ryūsen-zu 流宣図 is a style of woodblock print maps created by the ukiyo-e artist and popular writer Ishikawa Ryūsen (or Tomonobu)(jp) in the Edo period in Japan.

== History ==
The term Ryūsen-zu refers to maps composed by Ryūsen, but it is usually specifically used to mean Japanese provincial maps made by him. As an epoch-making map style, publishers reproduced or reprinted these maps over and over from the late seventeenth century to the mid-eighteenth century, until another popular map style, Sekisui-zu (a map style developed by a geographer, Nagakubo Sekisui,(jp) appeared. Whereas Sekisui pursued geographic accuracy in his maps, Ryūsen created a variety of cartographic productions based on the imagination and experience of an artist and a writer. Ryūsen added new contents to his maps to make attracting productions for the consumers.

The features of Ryūsen-zu suggest that a prototype of Ryūsen-zu was kuniezu. According to the exhibition catalogue Cartography in Japan: Official Maps Past and Present, Ryūsen-zu was a remodel of Keichō kuniezu, published in 1605. Provincial mapmaking was initially a political project by the Tokugawa shogunate. The purpose of the map projects was to enable the government to share official information, such as the locations of domains and provinces, the names of feudal lords, and the feudal lords’ annual incomes, to show off their power. The provincial maps also included big cities, major roads, stations, shipping routes, major mountains, rivers, and other geographic landmarks, but Ryūsen-zu was not simply a provincial map. It should avoid assuming that provincial maps made by an individual artist Ryūsen had the same nature as provincial maps composed by shogunal mapmakers for the style.

== Style ==
Another prototype of Ryūsen-zu is chizu byōbu (jp) (Japanese or folded screens bearing a Japanese provincial map or the world map). The early Ryūsen-style Japanese maps were mostly in the form of byōbu instead of on a sheet of paper. From this standpoint, it makes perfect sense that, as an ukiyo-e painter, Ryūsen stressed aesthetic values rather than the topographic accuracy of his maps, particularly in his early works. The maps consist mainly of three islands—Honshū, Shikoku, and Kyūshu—shaped by unique wavy coastlines. Ryūsen embedded these islands in a horizontally oblong rectangular frame as a screen panel and used color-coding to differentiate domains, sea, mountains, and other symbols in his maps. Ryūsen produced a multi-color print version, a hand-tinted version, or a black and white version.

Ryūsen originally produced maps of Japan as artworks, but the reception of readers could change the original purpose of works. In fact, Ryūsen’s maps played to popular audiences and that his map productions were pastiches of the various kinds of published geographical information (e.g., the stations of major routes, shipping routes, a distance table from Edo, or a turntable of tides) that would have been available in the late seventeenth century.

== Works ==
- Honchō zukan kōmoku 本朝圖艦綱目, 1686. (UBC Library Open Collections)
- Honchō zukan kōmoku 本朝圖艦綱目, 1689. (UBC Library Open Collections)
- Nihon kaizan chōrikuzu 日本海山潮陸圖, 1691. (UBC Library Open Collections)
- Nihon sankai zudō taizen 日本山海圖道大全, 1697. (UBC Library Open Collections)
- [Nihon] zukan kōmoku [日本]圖艦綱目, 1697. (UBC Library Open Collections)
- Dai Nihon shōtō zukan 大日本正統圖鑑, 1702. (UBC Library Open Collections)
- Nihon sankai zudō taizen 日本山海圖道大全, 1703, (UBC Library Open Collections)
