= Japan–Ming trade-ship flag =

Japanese Important Cultural Property

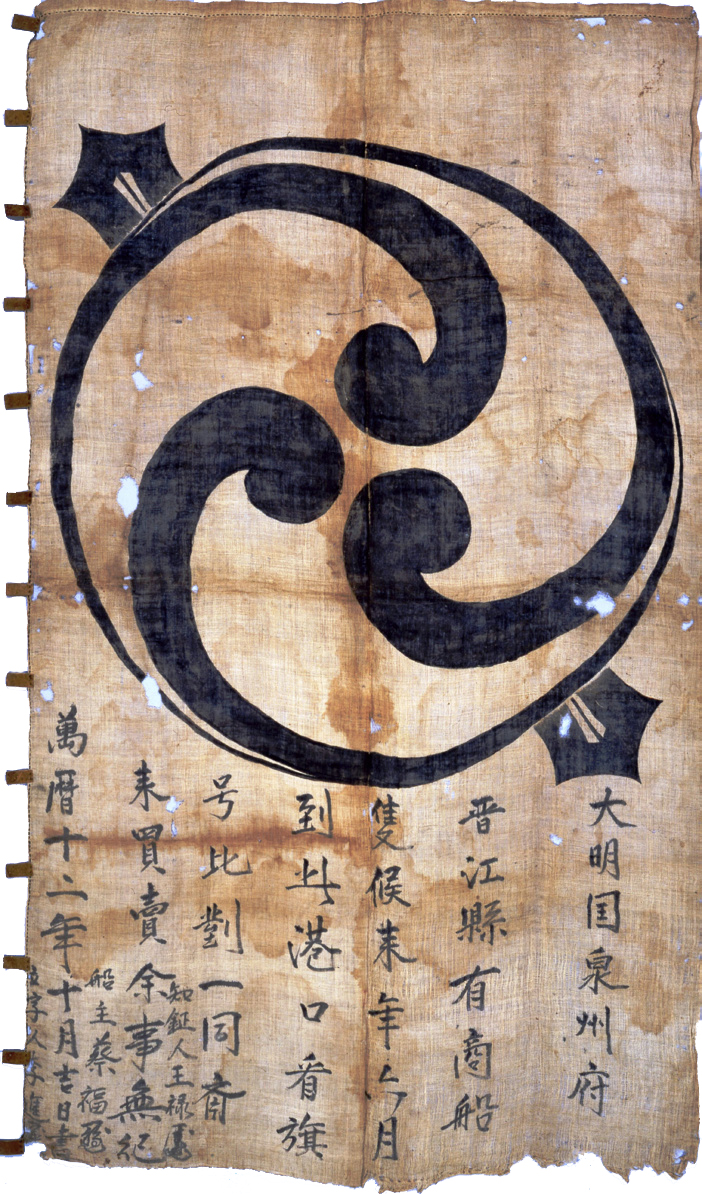
Japan-Ming trade ship flag (1584) (ICP), 167 by 95 centimetres (66 in × 37 in) (Yamaguchi Prefectural Archives)

The Japan–Ming trade-ship flag (日明貿易船旗, Nichi-Min bōeki sen-ki) is an object dating to 1584 preserved at the Yamaguchi Prefectural Archives that has been designated an Important Cultural Property of Japan due to its historical significance and the light it shines on trade and relations between Momoyama Japan and Ming China.

== Background ==
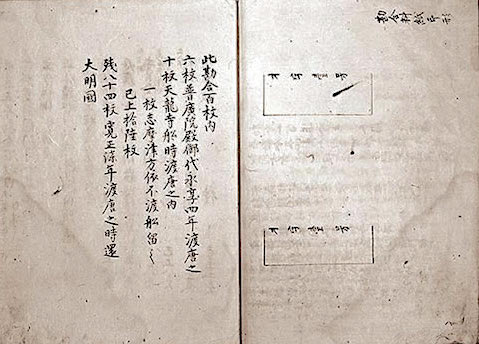
Sketch of a Ming tally trading licence or kangō (ja) from Record of Entrance into Ming China in Yang Earth Rat (戊子入明記) (i.e., 1468), the journal of Zen priest Tenyo Seikei (ja), preserved at Myōchi-in, a sub-temple of Tenryū-ji in Kyōto. Approved "tribute ships" were issued an official licence. To enable verification that a licence was genuine, it was produced by placing the blank document in a registration book, so as to cover half the writing surface, prior to its inscription (with brush and ink); when the inked licence was removed, half of the characters would be left behind; on the basis that only the original licence would be an exact match when placed on the corresponding leaf of the register, approved tribute ships could be determined (cf. split tally sticks)

In 1371, in an attempt to prevent opponents joining forces with the wakō, the Hongwu Emperor, founder of the Ming, issued a maritime prohibition on private overseas voyages and commerce. Foreign merchants sailing to China for trade were also banned, communication with anyone defying this ban was punishable by death. In 1383, a trade tally system was then introduced to facilitate tributary missions from foreign powers.

The last of the Japanese missions to Tang China occurred in the ninth century, and several more recent attempts to establish diplomatic relations with the Ming had been rebuffed. But a Hakata merchant named Koitsumi (ja) returned from China and told Ashikaga Yoshimitsu of the profits that could be made through trade with the Great Ming. In Ōei 8 (1401), the Ashikaga shogunate dispatched the first of the Japanese missions to Ming China. They carried with a "tribute" of gold, horses, and swords, as well as a number of Chinese castaways for repatriation. The mission was headed, like those that followed, by a Zen monk from the Five Mountains in Kyōto; Koitsumi served as vice-ambassador. This mission "marked the re-opening of trade relations" between Muromachi Japan and Ming China.

The second mission, headed by Kenchū Keimitsu, set off for China in 1403; when it returned the following year, it did so with an envoy from the Ming and 100 Yongle tallies: "this marks the beginning of the 'tally trade'" (勘合貿易, kangō bōeki), the 1404 mission the first to implement this system. While the Ming government would make official purchases, the Japanese envoys and accompanying merchants were permitted to conduct private trade with licensed counterparts. Ningbo was their assigned "port of entry". For nearly one hundred and fifty years, until the last such mission in 1547, Chinese "gifts", such as silk thread, brocades, medicines, books, and ceramics, were provided in return for Japanese "tribute", such as lacquerware, bronze vessels, swords, armour, fans, screens, and sulphur (used in papermaking).

Chinese copper coinage was also imported into Japan in vast quantities. A 1999 study of 275 Japanese hoards, totaling 3,530,000 coins, found that the Chinese copper coins used in Japan in the Middle Ages were brought over in the largest number in the thirteenth century; in 1242 alone Japan is said to have imported one hundred million Chinese coins. cf. Shinori hoard). In 1407, the Ming court "gifted" its Japanese counterparts fifteen million coins, and thirty million more in 1434. In the opposite direction, the 1539 Japanese mission took with it 180,000 kilograms (400,000 lb) of copper, close to twice as much as any of the fifteenth-century missions. Discovery of rich veins of silver in Japan in the first half of the sixteenth century (see Iwami Ginzan Silver Mine) added this to the mix, and with the exchange rate between the silver tael and copper coins running at 1:750 in China and 1:250 in Japan, there was some profit potential.

The trade was not without danger: marauding wakō pirates continued to menace shipping, peaking in the 1550s. The Ningbo incident occurred in 1523, and from the 1510s, the Portuguese were a new presence. Nevertheless, it was not until the fall of the Ōuchi clan, who by this time had effectively monopolized the missions, in the middle of the sixteenth century, that this pattern would be finally broken. The 1547 mission, returning in 1549, was the last to be accommodated by the Ming authorities. As per The Cambridge History of Japan, "by the middle of the sixteenth century, political conditions in Japan had become so chaotic that there was indeed good reason to question the legitimacy of embassies arriving from that country". Two further dates help frame that of the Japan-Ming trade ship flag: 1567, when the Ming rescinded their maritime prohibitions, and 1592, when Toyotomi Hideyoshi launched his initial invasion of Korea. The conquest of the Ming, that effete "country of long sleeves", was next on his list: "to take by force this virgin of a country, Ming, will be [as easy] as for a mountain to crush an egg".

== Description ==
The sizeable flag, measuring some 167 by 95 centimetres (66 in × 37 in), is made of hemp, two widths of cloth joined to make one larger canvas. The top is folded back over itself, and stitched with black hemp thread. Running up the left-hand side, to enable attachment to a flagpole, are thirteen "nipples" (乳), of deer-hide, stitched on, again, with black hemp thread. The upper and central field is occupied by the large "swords and circles" mon (剣巴紋), or family crest, of the Takasu Family. Below, is the brushed ink inscription, with the signatures and kaō, or stylized signatures, of three Ming merchants:

大明国泉州府	Country of the Great Ming, Quanzhou Prefecture,
晉江縣有商船	Jinjiang County merchant ship(s) shall,
隻候来年六月	next year, in the sixth month,
到此港口看旗	arrive at this port; identified and verified by flag,
号此対一同斉	together with the same, here, shall there be trade.
知鉦人王録（花押）	Witness Wang Lu (kaō)
来買賣余事無紀	Permit to come, buy, sell, nothing else.
船主蔡福（花押）	Ship's owner Cai Fu (kaō)
萬暦十二年十月吉日書	Wanli 12 (1584), tenth month, first day
立字人李進（花押）	Overseer Li Jin (kaō)

== Significance ==
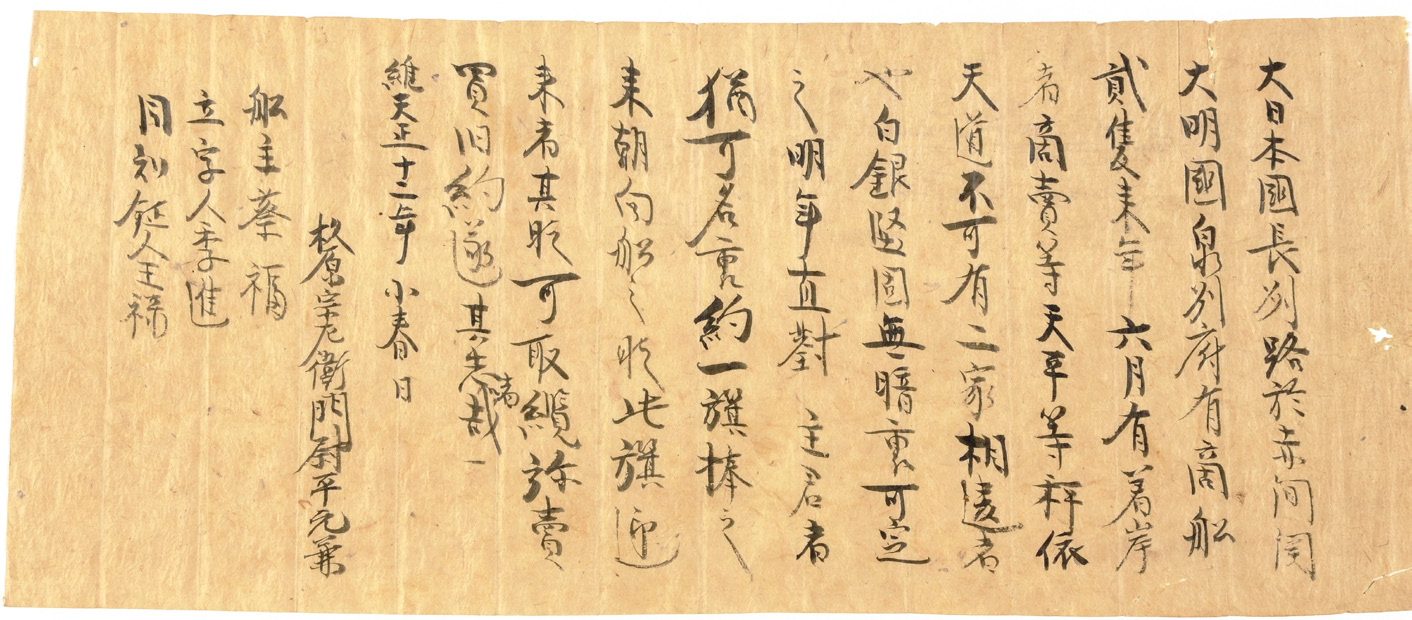
Draft agreement between Takasu Motokane (高須元兼) and the same three Ming merchants, similarly dating to the tenth month of Tenshō 12 (1584), in which it is stated that, two ships belonging to Cai Fu having just arrived at Akamegaseki, upon his return the following year, such a flag would enable rendezvous with assigned trading partners, in accordance with the wishes of Mōri Terumoto (Yamaguchi Prefectural Archives)

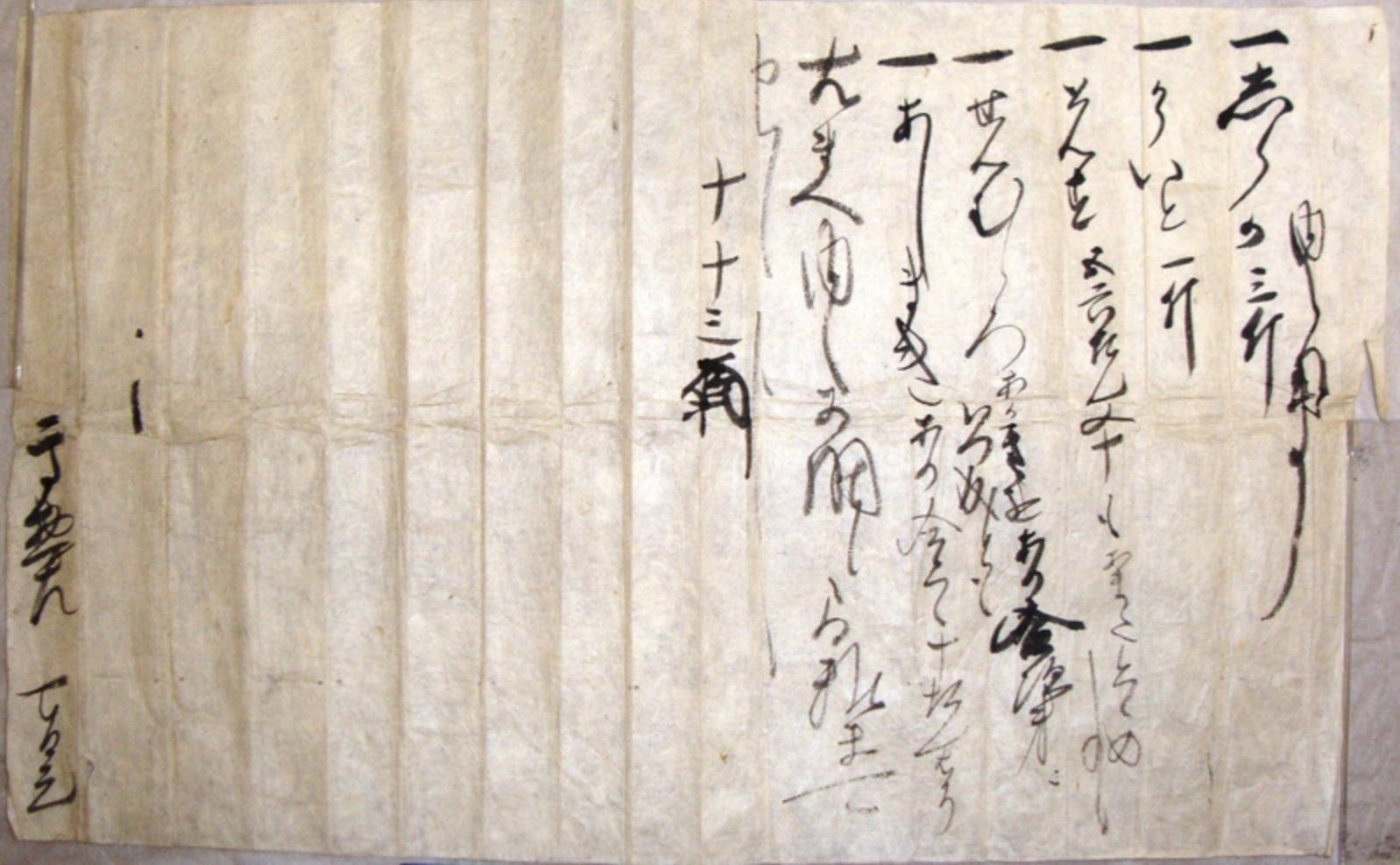
Letter from Mōri Terumoto to Takasu Motokane of the Tenshō era entitled "private dealings" (内々用事) and detailing trade goods to be obtained, also their quantities, including saltpetre and one catty of kara-ito or "Chinese threads" (Yamaguchi Prefectural Archives)

The flag dates from the latter part of the sixteenth century, when formal and official trading relations between the two countries had ended, but private commercial interests continued nonetheless with local lords presiding. At this point in Sengoku Japan, after the collapse of the Ashikaga shogunate and the death of unifying warlord Oda Nobunaga in 1582, no central authority was in a position to manage foreign trade and relations, leaving local daimyō free to adopt their own measures. Contemporary Chinese sources also suggest the central Ming government in Beijing, the "northern capital", was unable fully to control the vessels coming and going from its southern coasts.

Dated by its inscription to 1584, the flag was to be raised the following year by a trading ship from Quanzhou in China as a "port entry certificate" in Akamagaseki, now Shimonoseki, in Nagato Province, then in the hands of the Mōri clan, and governed through their daikan (代官), from the Takasu Family.

The flag was preserved among the historical materials of the Takasu Family, who were originally landowners and officials in southern Bingo Province (now eastern Hiroshima Prefecture). With the changing times, they were retainers first of the Yamana clan, then the Ōuchi clan, and finally the Mōri clan. Later, in the Edo period, they would be samurai of Hagi Domain. From around 1578, family head Takasu Motokane served in the capacity of daikan of Akamagaseki (赤間関代官), his responsibilities ranging from governing this and the neighboring towns to collecting tariffs, managing trade vessels, and mediating disputes, as well as procuring foreign goods for public and private purposes.

In 2010, in a joint designation with a grouping of one hundred and seventeen of the Takasu Family Documents, (Note: 458 Takasu Family Documents (高洲家文書) are held at the Yamaguchi Prefectural Archives, out of which these 117 were designated; this smaller grouping, dating from 1351 to 1643, includes 21 documents issued by the Yamana clan, 4 by the Ōuchi clan, 61 by the Mōri clan, and 4 by the Ashikaga clan; ten further documents were added to the designation in 2017) the Japan-Ming trade ship flag was designated an Important Cultural Property, the Agency for Cultural Affairs declaring it "an unparalleled material that tangibly manifests the realities of Japan-Ming trade". (Note: 「日明貿易の実態を物的に示す比類ない資料である」) Handed down in the Takasu Family and still formally privately owned, the flag is on deposit at the Yamaguchi Prefectural Archives. In 2015, the trade ship flag formed part of the Kyūshū National Museum special exhibition, Sengoku Daimyo: 16th century Warlords' Rivalry in Kyushu over billowing Asian seas. The Takasu originally from Bingo Province and officiating at Akamegaseki in the Kanmon Straits, gateway to the Inland Sea, there is also a replica of the flag at the Hiroshima Prefectural Museum of History in Fukuyama.

== See also ==
- Haijin, Sakoku
- Abe no Nakamaro
- Sakishima Beacons
- Murakami kaizoku
- Zheng He
