= List of archives in Japan =

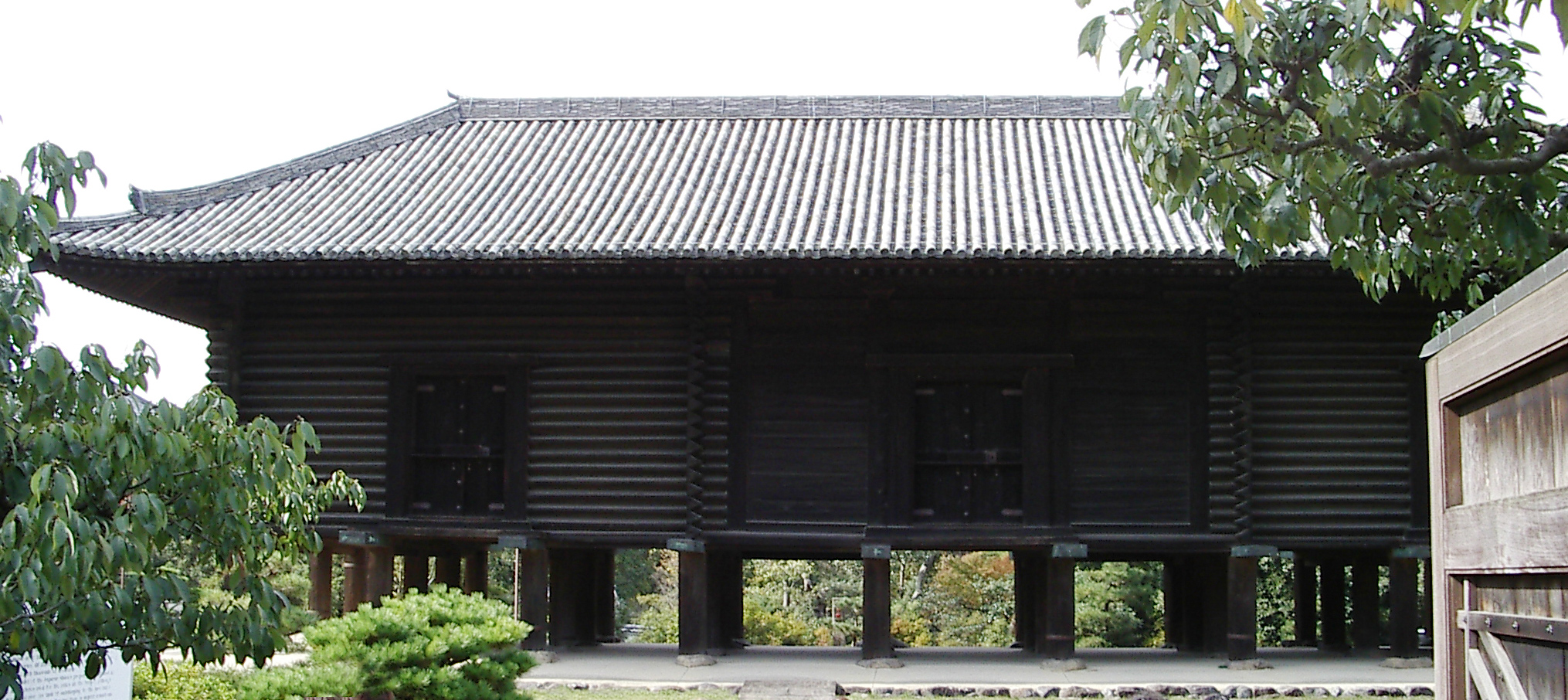
The Shōsōin, Tōdai-ji's eighth-century treasure house in Nara (National Treasure); its holdings include over eleven thousand documents

This is a list of archives (文書館, monjokan) in Japan. According to the National Archives of Japan, "archives are one of the three key pillars of culture, together with libraries and museums".

== Background ==
Archive-like facilities and repositories for official documents known as Kan no Fudono (官文殿) existed in the Asuka period, while the Shōsōin's holdings include over 11,000 paper documents (文書, monjo). The post-war period of Occupation saw the passing of the Library Act (1950) and Museum Act (1951); also in 1951, by ministerial decree, the Ministry of Education set up its Repository for Historical Documents (文部省史料館, shiryōkan) to collect old documents (古文書, komonjo) and records, the nucleus of the Department of Historical Documents at the National Institute of Japanese Literature. 1959 saw establishment of the Yamaguchi Prefectural Archives (山口県文書館, Yamaguchi-ken Monjo-kan), the country's first dedicated archival institution; from the outset it collected public administrative and governmental records (公文書, kōmonjo) as well as old documents (古文書, komonjo). Further prefectural archives followed in Saitama, Tōkyō, and Kyōto in the 1960s, and in 1971 the National Archives were established. By the end of the 1970s there were fifteen archives at the national, prefectural, and city levels. The 1980s brought nine further prefectural archives and four in ordinance-designated cities, while the Public Archives Act (公文書館法) was passed in 1987. Entering into force in June the following year, the first of its seven articles stresses the "importance of preserving and providing for use public records and archives as historical materials." Nevertheless, recent municipal mergers and dissolutions have occasioned concerns about the loss of municipal records.

== National Archives ==
- National Archives of Japan (国立公文書館)
  - Japan Center for Asian Historical Records (アジア歴史資料センター)
- Military Archives of the National Institute for Defense Studies of the Ministry of Defense (防衛省防衛研究所戦史研究センター史料閲覧室)
- Diplomatic Archives of the Ministry of Foreign Affairs of Japan (外務省外交史料館)
- National Institute of Japanese Literature (国文学研究資料館)
- Imperial Household Archives (宮内公文書館), Archives and Mausolea Department of the Imperial Household Agency (宮内庁書陵部)

== Prefectural Archives ==
- The Archives of Hokkaidō (北海道立文書館)
- Aomori Prefecture Archives Center (青森県公文書センター)
- Miyagi Prefectural Archives (宮城県公文書館)
- Akita Prefectural Archives (秋田県公文書館)
- Yamagata Prefecture Archives Center (山形県公文書センター)
- Fukushima Prefectural Archives (福島県歴史資料館)
- Ibaraki Prefectural Archives and Museum (茨城県立歴史館)
- Tochigi Prefectural Archives (栃木県立文書館)
- Gunma Prefectural Archives (群馬県立文書館)
- Saitama Prefectural Archives (埼玉県立文書館)
- Chiba Prefectural Archives (千葉県文書館)
- Tōkyō Metropolitan Archives (東京都公文書館)
- Kanagawa Prefectural Archives (神奈川県立公文書館)
- Niigata Prefectural Archives (新潟県立文書館)
- Toyama Prefectural Archives (富山県公文書館)
- Fukui Prefectural Archives (福井県文書館)
- Nagano Prefectural Museum of History (長野県立歴史館)
- Gifu Prefectural Archives (岐阜県歴史資料館)
- Shizuoka Prefectural Archives (静岡県公文書センター)
- Aichi Prefectural Archives (愛知県公文書館)
- Mie Prefectural Museum (三重県総合博物館)
- Shiga Prefectural Archives (滋賀県立公文書館)
- Kyōto Institute, Library and Archives (京都府立京都学・歴彩館)
- Ōsaka Prefecture Archives (大阪府公文書館)
- The Archives of Hyōgo Prefectural Government (兵庫県公館県政資料館)
- Nara Prefectural Library and Information Center (奈良県立図書情報館)
- Wakayama Prefectural Archives (和歌山県立文書館)
- Tottori Prefectural Archives (鳥取県立公文書館)
- Shimane Prefecture Public Records Center (島根県公文書センター)
- Okayama Prefectural Archives (岡山県立記録資料館)
- Hiroshima Prefectural Archives (広島県立文書館)
- Yamaguchi Prefectural Archives (山口県文書館)
- Tokushima Prefectural Archives (徳島県立文書館)
- Kagawa Prefectural Archives (香川県立文書館)
- Kōchi Prefectural Archives (高知県立公文書館)
- Fukuoka Communal Archives (福岡共同公文書館)
- Saga Prefectural Government Archives (佐賀県公文書館)
- Ōita Prefectural Archives (大分県公文書館)
- Miyazaki Prefecture Document Center (宮崎県文書センター)
- Okinawa Prefectural Archives (沖縄県公文書館)

== Municipal Archives ==
- Kobe City Archives
- Nagoya City Archives
- Yokohama Archives of History

== See also ==
- List of museums in Japan
- List of libraries in Japan
- Cultural Property (Japan)
