= Laura Hein =

American historian of Japan

- Occupation: Historian

Academic background
- Education: University of Massachusetts Boston (BA); University of Wisconsin–Madison (MA, PhD)
- Doctoral advisor: John Dower

Academic work
- Discipline: History
- Sub-discipline: History of Japan
- Institutions: Northwestern University
- Notable works: Fueling Growth: The Energy Revolution and Economic Policy in Postwar Japan (1990) Reasonable Men, Powerful Words (2004) Post-Fascist Japan (2018)

Laura Hein is an American historian of modern Japan. She is the Harold H. and Virginia Anderson Professor of History at Northwestern University. Her research focuses on twentieth-century Japanese political culture, economic policy, war memory, and Japan's international relations.

Hein is the author of several books on modern Japanese history and political culture as well as the general editor of The New Cambridge History of Japan.

== Academic career ==
Hein received a Bachelor of Arts in history from the University of Massachusetts Boston, graduating summa cum laude in 1978.

She earned an MA (1982) and a PhD (1986) in modern Japanese history from the University of Wisconsin–Madison, where she studied under John Dower.

During her doctoral studies she conducted research in Japan, including work as a visiting research fellow at Hosei University in Tokyo.

After completing her doctorate, Hein held a postdoctoral fellowship at the Edwin O. Reischauer Institute of Japanese Studies at Harvard University.

Hein joined the faculty of Northwestern University in 1987, becoming full professor of Japanese history in 2005, and serving as chair of the Department of History from 2017 to 2020. In 2018, Hein was named Harold H. and Virginia Anderson Professor of History.

In addition to her teaching and research, Hein has been active in institutional initiatives related to global and Asian studies at Northwestern University.

== Scholarship ==
Hein's scholarship focuses on the political culture, intellectual history, and economic policy debates of modern Japan. Much of her work explores the relationship between economic ideas, political institutions, and social change in the twentieth century.

Her first book, Fueling Growth: The Energy Revolution and Economic Policy in Postwar Japan (1990), examines the relationship between energy policy and Japan's postwar economic expansion.

Her second book Reasonable Men, Powerful Words: Political Culture and Expertise in Twentieth-Century Japan (2004) analyzes the role of economists and intellectual networks in shaping policy debates in modern Japan.

In her third book, Post-Fascist Japan: Political Culture in Kamakura after World War II (2018), Hein examines how civic leaders and intellectuals in the city of Kamakura sought to rebuild democratic political culture after the end of the Second World War.

In addition to her monographs, Hein has co-edited several volumes on war memory, Okinawa, and transnational cultural history.

She also serves as general editor of The New Cambridge History of Japan, a multi-volume reference work published by Cambridge University Press.

== Selected works ==
=== Books ===
Hein, Laura (1990). Fueling Growth: The Energy Revolution and Economic Policy in Postwar Japan. Cambridge, Massachusetts: Harvard University Asia Center.

Hein, Laura (2004). Reasonable Men, Powerful Words: Political Culture and Expertise in Twentieth-Century Japan. Berkeley: University of California Press.

Hein, Laura (2018). Post-Fascist Japan: Political Culture in Kamakura after World War II. London: Bloomsbury Academic.

=== Edited volumes ===
Hein, Laura; Selden, Mark, eds. (1997). Living with the Bomb: American and Japanese Cultural Conflicts in the Nuclear Age. Armonk, New York: M. E. Sharpe.

Hein, Laura; Selden, Mark, eds. (2000). Censoring History: Citizenship and Memory in Japan, Germany, and the United States. Armonk, New York: M. E. Sharpe.

Hein, Laura; Selden, Mark, eds. (2003). Islands of Discontent: Okinawan Responses to Japanese and American Power. Lanham, Maryland: Rowman & Littlefield.

Hein, Laura; Jennison, Rebecca, eds. (2010). Imagination Without Borders: Visual Artist Tomiyama Taeko and Social Responsibility. Ann Arbor: University of Michigan Center for Japanese Studies.
