= The New Cambridge History of Japan =

Three-volume series

The Cambridge History of Japan
- Author: Laura Hein
- Country: United Kingdom
- Language: English
- Genre: Japanese history
- Publisher: Cambridge University Press
- Published: 2023–2024
- No. of books: 2 (3 planned)

The New Cambridge History of Japan is a three-volume series published by Cambridge University Press. It is intended to replace the six-volume The Cambridge History of Japan published in the 20th century. The series is edited by Northwestern University professor Laura Hein.

== Volumes ==
1. Premodern Japan: A Millennium of Evolving Themes (edited by Hitomi Tonomura). This volume will cover Japan before the seventeenth century.
2. Early Modern Japan in Asia and the World, c.1580–1877 (edited by David L. Howell). This volume covers the Edo period.
3. The Modern Japanese Nation and Empire, c.1868 to the Twenty-First Century (edited by Laura Hein). This volume covers events from the Meiji Restoration to the 21st century.
