= Peter Duus =

American historian (1933–2022)

- Born: December 27, 1933; Wilmington, Delaware, U.S.
- Died: November 5, 2022 (aged 88); California, U.S.
- Education: Harvard University (BA, PhD); University of Michigan (MA)
- Employer(s): Washington University in St. Louis (1964–1966); Harvard University (1966–1970); Claremont Graduate School (1970–1973); Stanford University (1973–2004)
- Spouse: Masayo Duus (m. 1964–2022)
- Children: 1

Peter Duus (December 27, 1933 – November 5, 2022) was an American Japanologist, historian, and translator. He was emeritus professor of history at Stanford University and a senior fellow at the Hoover Institution, as well as president of the Association for Asian Studies in 2000–2001.

He received the Order of the Rising Sun from the Japanese government in 2012.

== Selected bibliography ==
- Party Rivalry and Political Change in Taisho Japan (Harvard University Press, 1968).
- Feudalism in Japan (Knopf, 1969).
- The Rise of Modern Japan (Houghton Mifflin, 1976).
- The Abacus and the Sword: The Japanese Penetration of Korea, 1895-1910 (University of California Press, 1995).
- Modern Japan (Houghton Mifflin, 1993, 2nd ed., 1998).
- The Japanese Discovery of America: A Brief History with Documents (Bedford Books, 1997).

He was the editor of The Cambridge History of Japan, Volume 6 (1988).

He also translated a selection of books by his wife, the writer Masayo Umezawa Duus (ドウス 昌代, née 梅沢).
