= Madoka =

- Gender: Female

Origin
- Origin: Japanese
- Meaning: Different meanings depending on the kanji used.
- Region of origin: Japan

Madoka is both a feminine Japanese given name and a Japanese surname.

== Written forms ==
Madoka can be written using different kanji characters and can mean:

as a given name

- 円, "circle"
- 円花, "circle, flower"
- 窓香, "window, incense/aroma"

as a surname

- 円, "circle"

The name can also be written in hiragana (まどか) or katakana (マドカ).

== People with the given name ==
- Madoka (wrestler) (円華; born 1983), Japanese professional wrestler
- Madoka Asahina (朝日奈 丸佳; born 1993), Japanese voice actress
- Madoka Haji (櫨 まどか; born 1988), Japanese women's footballer
- Madoka Harada (原田 窓香; born 1985), Japanese luger
- Madoka Hisagae (久枝 円; born 1979), Japanese fencer
- Madoka Kanai (金井 圓; 1927–2001), Japanese historian
- Madoka Kikuta (菊田 円; born 1999), Japanese professional wrestler
- Madoka Kimura (木村 まどか; born 1980), Japanese voice actress and singer
- Madoka Kitao (北尾 まどか; born 1980), Japanese shogi player
- Madoka Nakano (中野 円花; born 1991), Japanese long-distance runner
- Madoka Natsumi (夏見 円; born 1978), Japanese cross-country skier
- Madoka Przybylska, (born 2006) Polish rhythmic gymnast
- Madoka Sasaki (佐々木 望; 1883–1927), Japanese zoologist
- Madoka Sugai (菅井 円加; born 1994), Japanese ballet dancer
- Madoka Takagi, (1956–2015) Japanese-American photographer
- Madoka Yonezawa (米澤 円; born 1982), Japanese voice actress and singer
- Madoka (円), a Japanese rock star and guitarist for the band Unsraw

== People with the surname ==
- Yoriko Madoka (円 より子; born 1947), Japanese politician

== Fictional characters ==
with the given name Madoka

- Madoka (円), a character in the manga series Flame of Recca
- Madoka, a character in the video games TwinBee and Otomedius
- Madoka Akimoto (秋元まどか), a character in the anime series Yes! Pretty Cure 5
- Madoka Amahane (天羽 まどか), a character in the anime series Aikatsu!
- Madoka Amano (天野 まどか), a character in the anime series Beyblade: Metal Fusion
- Madoka Ayukawa (鮎川 まどか), a character in the manga series Kimagure Orange Road
- Madoka Fujisaki (藤崎 円香), a character in the manga series Angelic Layer
- Madoka Kaguya (香久矢 まどか), a character in the anime series Star Twinkle PreCure
- Madoka Kaname (鹿目 まどか), the title character of the anime series Puella Magi Madoka Magica
- Madoka Kijou (姫条 まどか), a character in the video game Tokimeki Memorial Girl's Side
- Madoka Kouenji (高円寺 円), Yuzuru's mother in the tokusatsu series B-Robo Kabutack
- Madoka Kyouno (京乃 まどか), protagonist of the anime series Lagrange: The Flower of Rin-ne
- Madoka Kugimiya (釘宮 円), a character in the manga and anime series Negima!
- Madoka Mano (真野 マドカ), a character in the anime series Devil Hunter Yohko
- Madoka Mawari (圓 円), a character in the manga series Tenjho Tenge
- Madoka Narumi, a character in the manga series Spiral: The Bonds of Reasoning
- Madoka Orimura (織斑 マドカ), a character in the light novel series Infinite Stratos
- Madoka Tsukimori (月森 円香), a character in the video game Fatal Frame IV
- Madoka Wakamatsu (若松 円), a character in the manga series Full Moon o Sagashite
- Madoka Higuchi (樋口まどか), A character in the video game Idolmaster Shiny Colors

with the surname Madoka

- Aguri Madoka (円 亜久里), a character in the anime series DokiDoki! PreCure
- Daigo Madoka (マドカ・ダイゴ), a character in the tokusatsu series Ultraman Tiga
- Kiyoko Madoka (円 紀世子), a character in the manga series Gilgamesh
- Tatsuya Madoka (円 竜也), a character in the manga series Gilgamesh
- Terumichi Madoka (円 輝道), a character in the manga series Gilgamesh
