= Yamaguchi Prefectural Archives =

Yamaguchi Prefectural Archives 山口県文書館
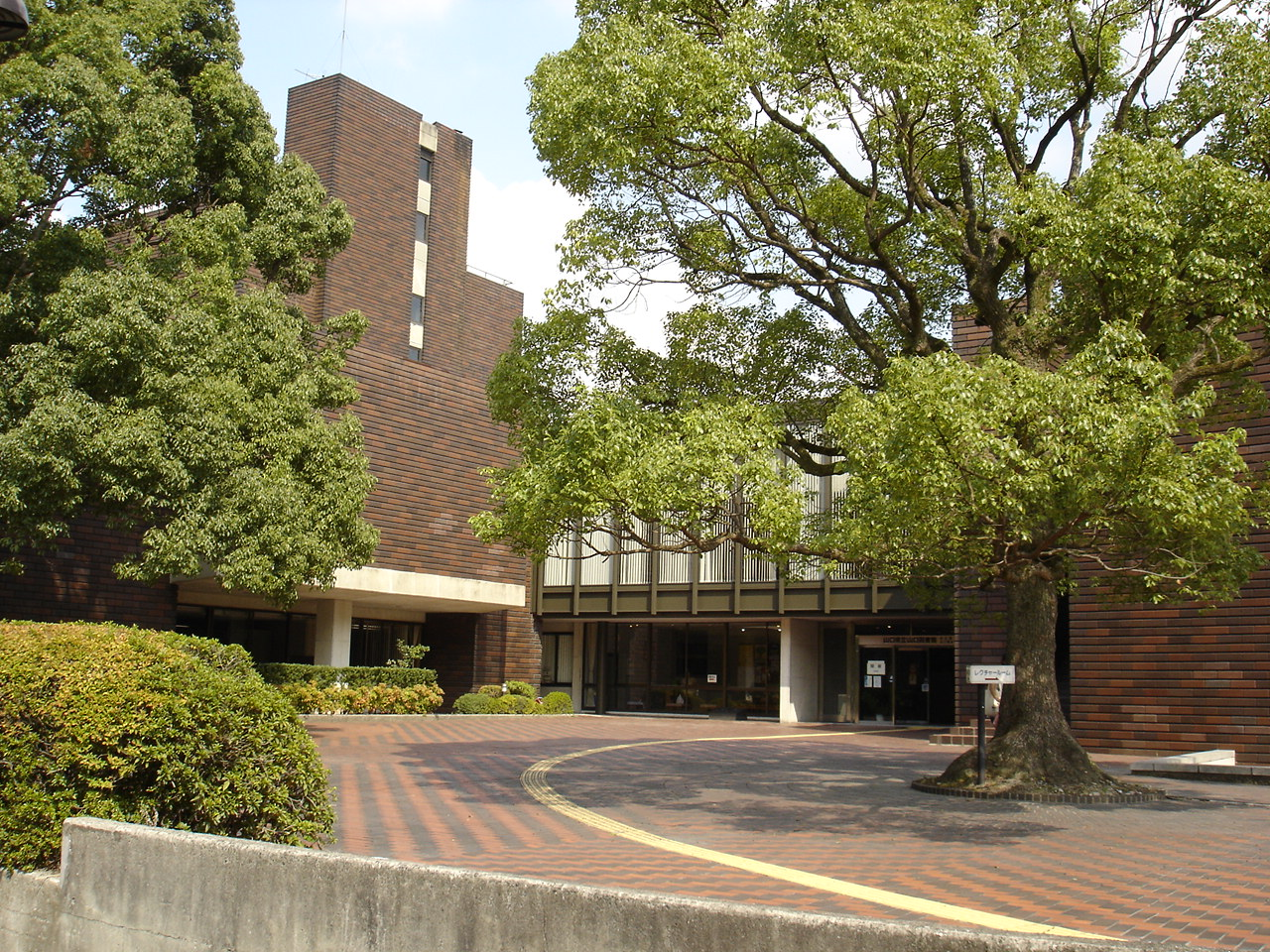
- Yamaguchi Prefectural Library
- Interactive map of Yamaguchi Prefectural Archives 山口県文書館
- 34°10′54″N 131°28′35″E
- Location: 150-1 Ushirogawara, Yamaguchi
- Established: April 1959
- Collection size: 530,000

Building information
- Building: Yamaguchi Prefectural Library 山口県立山口図書館
- Website: Official website (ja)

Yamaguchi Prefectural Archives (山口県文書館, Yamaguchi-ken Monjo-kan) opened in Yamaguchi, Yamaguchi Prefecture, Japan, in 1959 as the country's first dedicated modern archival institution.

== History ==
In Shōwa 27 (1952), the Mōri family, former daimyō of Chōshū Domain, deposited its domainal documents with Yamaguchi Prefecture, whereupon they were stored, alongside materials gathered by the pre-war Prefectural History Compilation Office, at Yamaguchi Prefectural Library (ja). These items were transferred in with the opening of Yamaguchi Prefectural Archives in 1959; donations and deposits - including materials from the Tokuyama Domain Mōri family - have continued since.

== Holdings ==
The archives holds approximately 530,000 documents, roughly divided into five groups:

- Domain documents, including:
  - Mōri Family Library (毛利家文庫)
  - Tokuyama Mōri Family Library (徳山毛利家文庫)
  - Prefectural Government's Old Clan Records (県庁伝来旧藩記録)
- Administrative documents, from the Meiji era onwards
- Administrative materials, from the Meiji era onwards
  - Publications, photographs, films, audio recordings, etc.
- Family documents, including:
  - Corporation, foundation, and family documents, including those of Edo period samurai houses
- Special library
  - Textbooks, newspapers, etc.

=== Cultural Properties ===
The holdings include seven Important Cultural Properties, two Prefectural Cultural Properties, and three Municipal Tangible Cultural Properties.

==== Important Cultural Properties ====
- Arimitsu Family Documents (有光家文書・長門国正吉郷入江塩浜絵図): 121 items, dating from the Kamakura period to the Edo period, together with a map of the Nagato Province Masayoshi Irie Salt Fields
- Kumagaya Family Documents (熊谷家文書（二百五十五通）): 255 documents mounted as 13 scrolls, dating from the Kamakura period to the Edo period
- Takasu Family Documents (高洲家文書・日明貿易船旗): 117 items, dating from 1351–1643, together with a Japan-Ming trade ship flag of Wanli 12 (1584)
- Ōuchi Edition Lotus Sūtra Woodblocks (大内版法華経板木): 59 woodblocks of the Muromachi period
- Noshima Murakami Family Documents (能島村上家文書・過所船旗): 199 items from the sixteenth century, together with a flag pass of Tenshō 9 (1581)
- Administrative Documents of Yamaguchi Prefecture (山口県行政文書): 13,549 items, dating from the Edo period to the Shōwa era
- Former Yamaguchi Prefectural Office and Prefectural Assembly Hall, together with construction records and plans (山口県旧県庁舎及び県会議事堂附工事関係記録6冊設計図5): 6 construction records and 5 plans, from the Taishō era

==== Prefectural Cultural Properties ====
- Materials relating to Yoshida Shōin (transmitted by the Yoshida family) (吉田松陰関係資料（吉田家伝来）): 754 items, including a portrait inscribed by Yoshida in the fifth month of Ansei 6 (1859), and his zeppitsu or final writing (Tangible Cultural Property)
- Oda Family Household Items, Merchant House Materials, and Townhouse (小田家の生活用具・商家資料・町家): 1,011 documents (Tangible Folk Cultural Property)

== From the archives ==
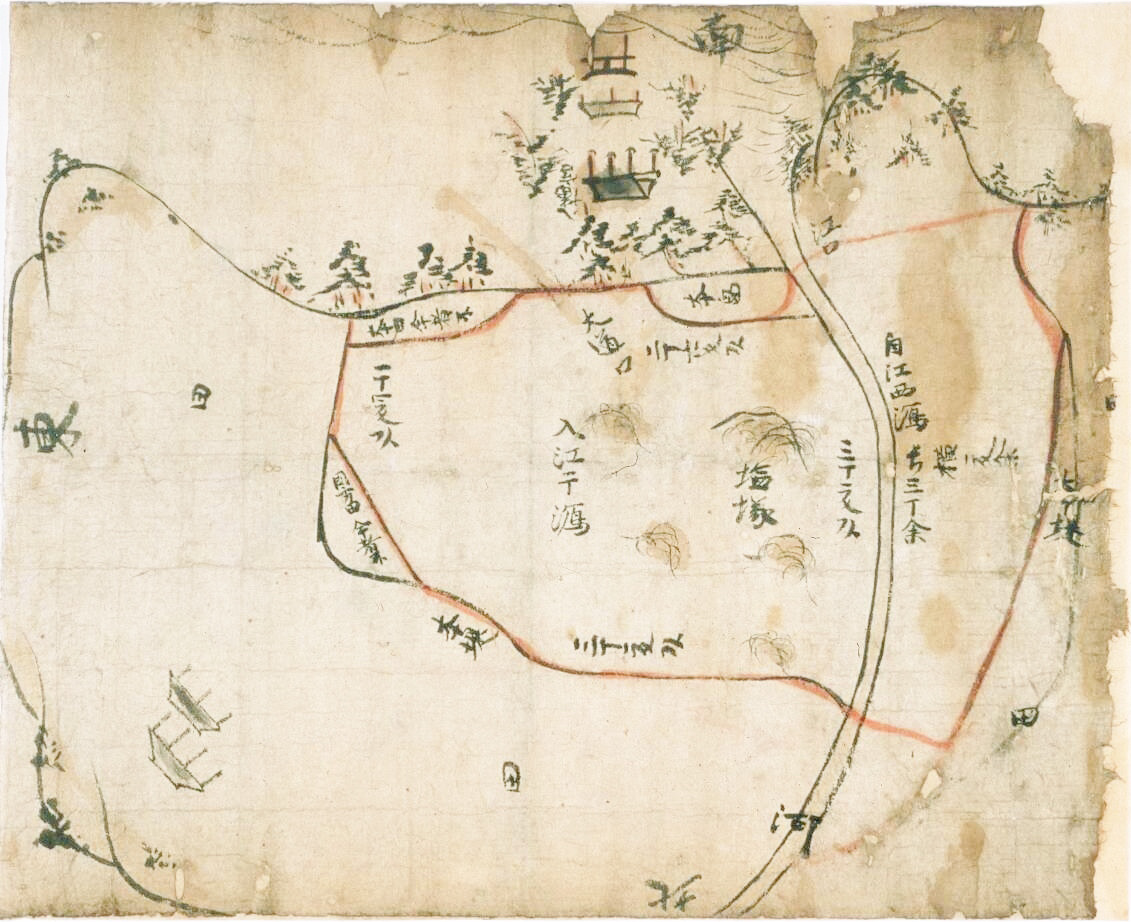
Map showing salt pans in what is now Shimonoseki (c.1327) (ICP)

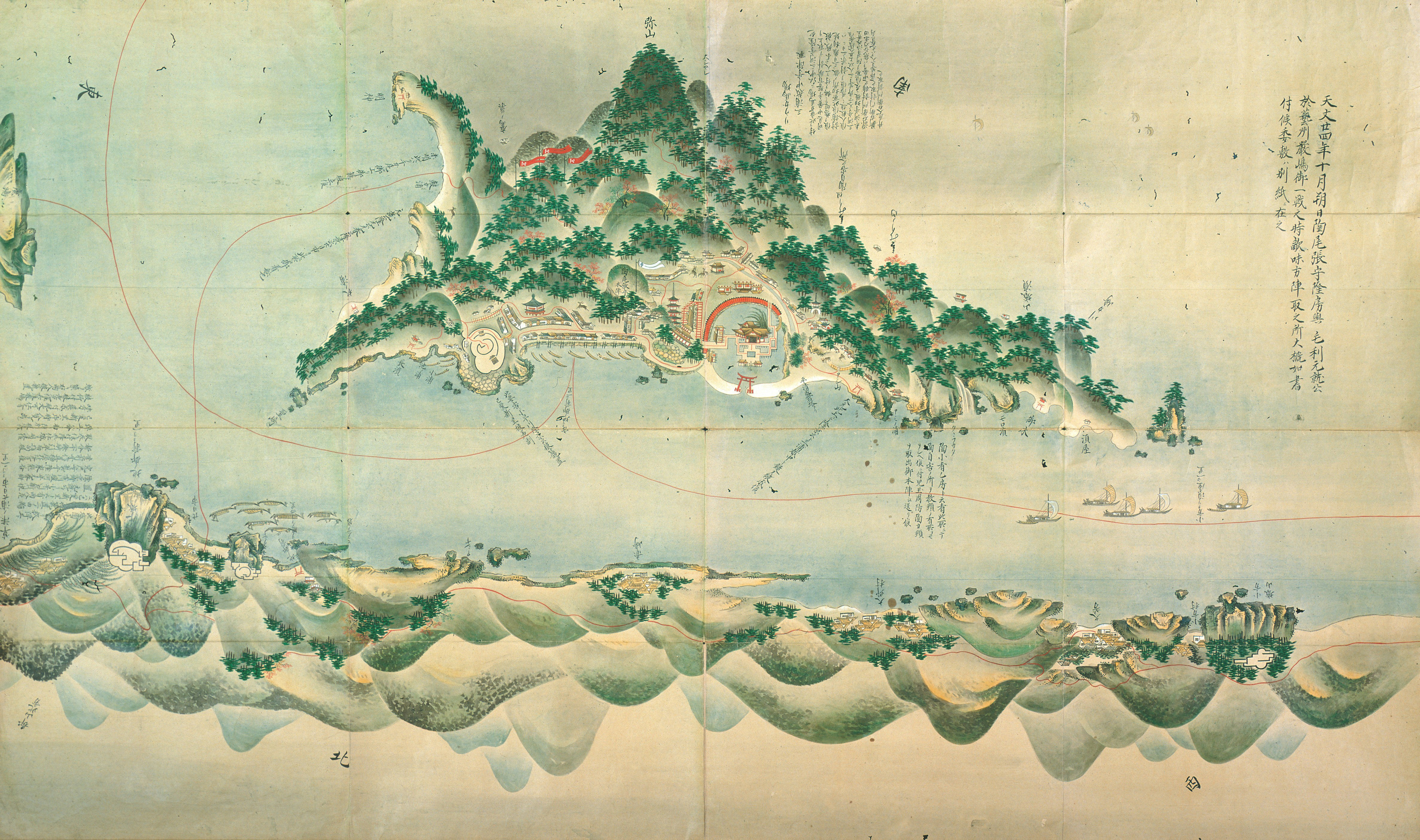
Battle of Geishū Itsukushima (1555)

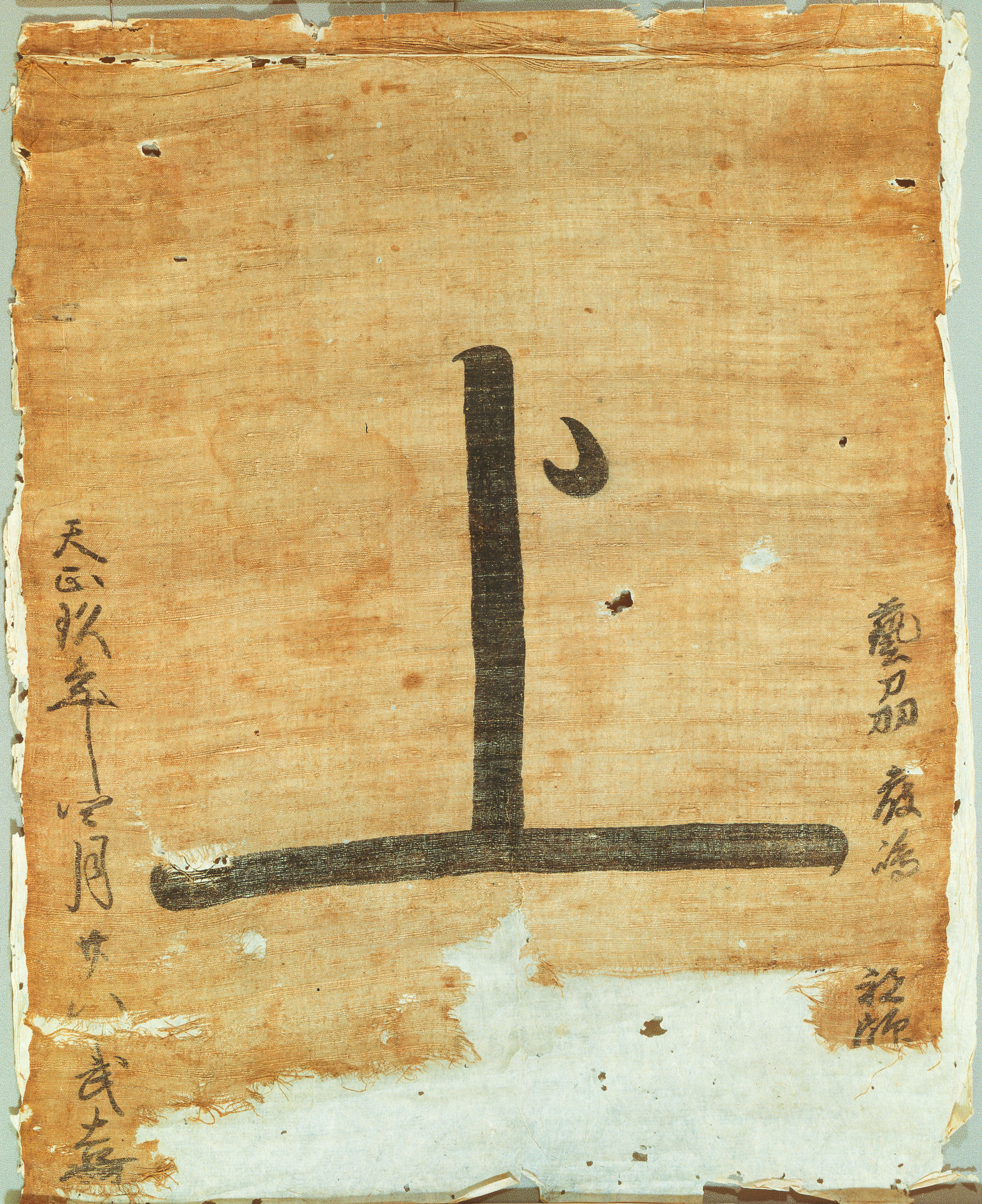
Flag pass of the Noshima Murakami kaizoku (1581) (ICP)

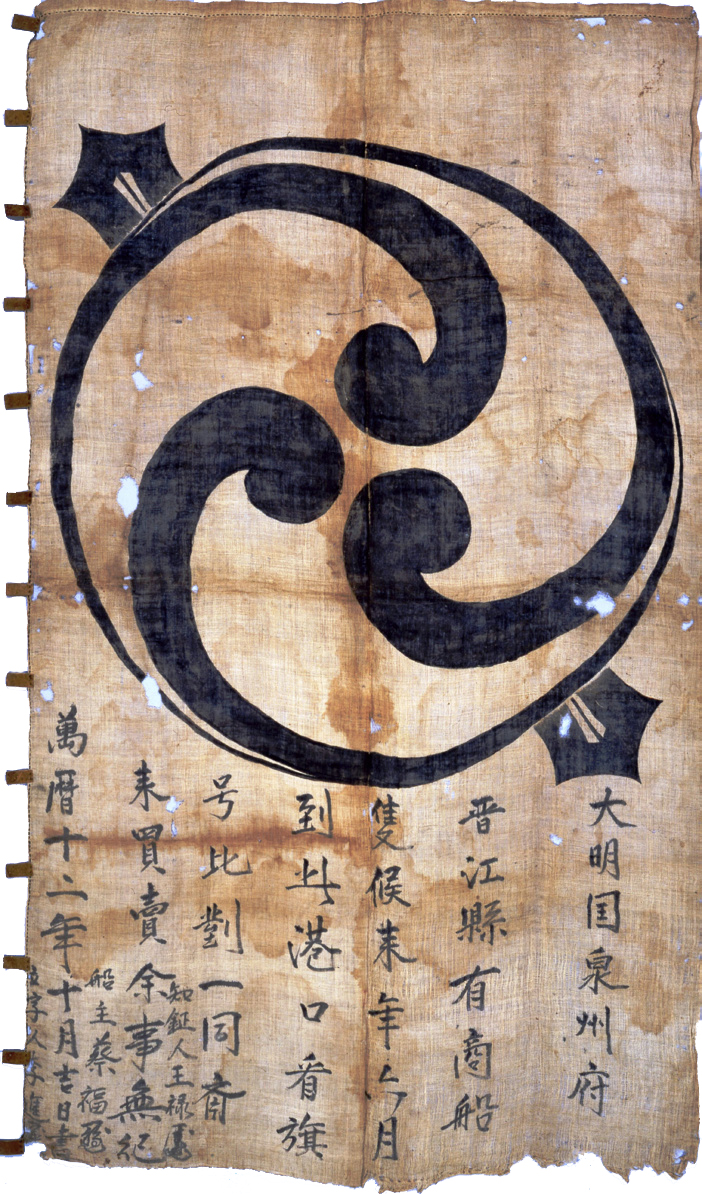
Japan-Ming trade ship flag (1584) (ICP)

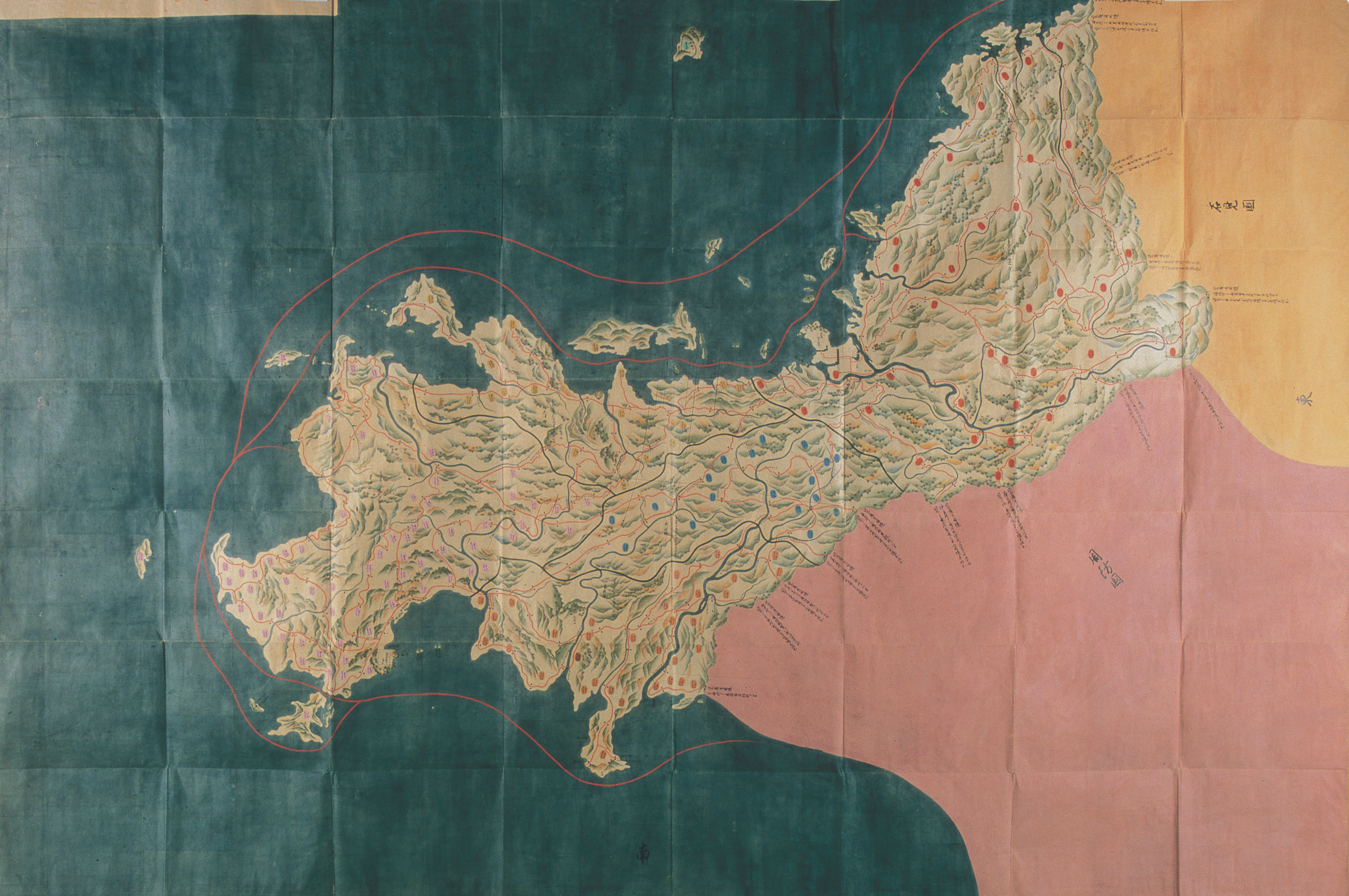
Genroku Kuniezu - Nagato Province, with Suō in pink and Iwami in yellow

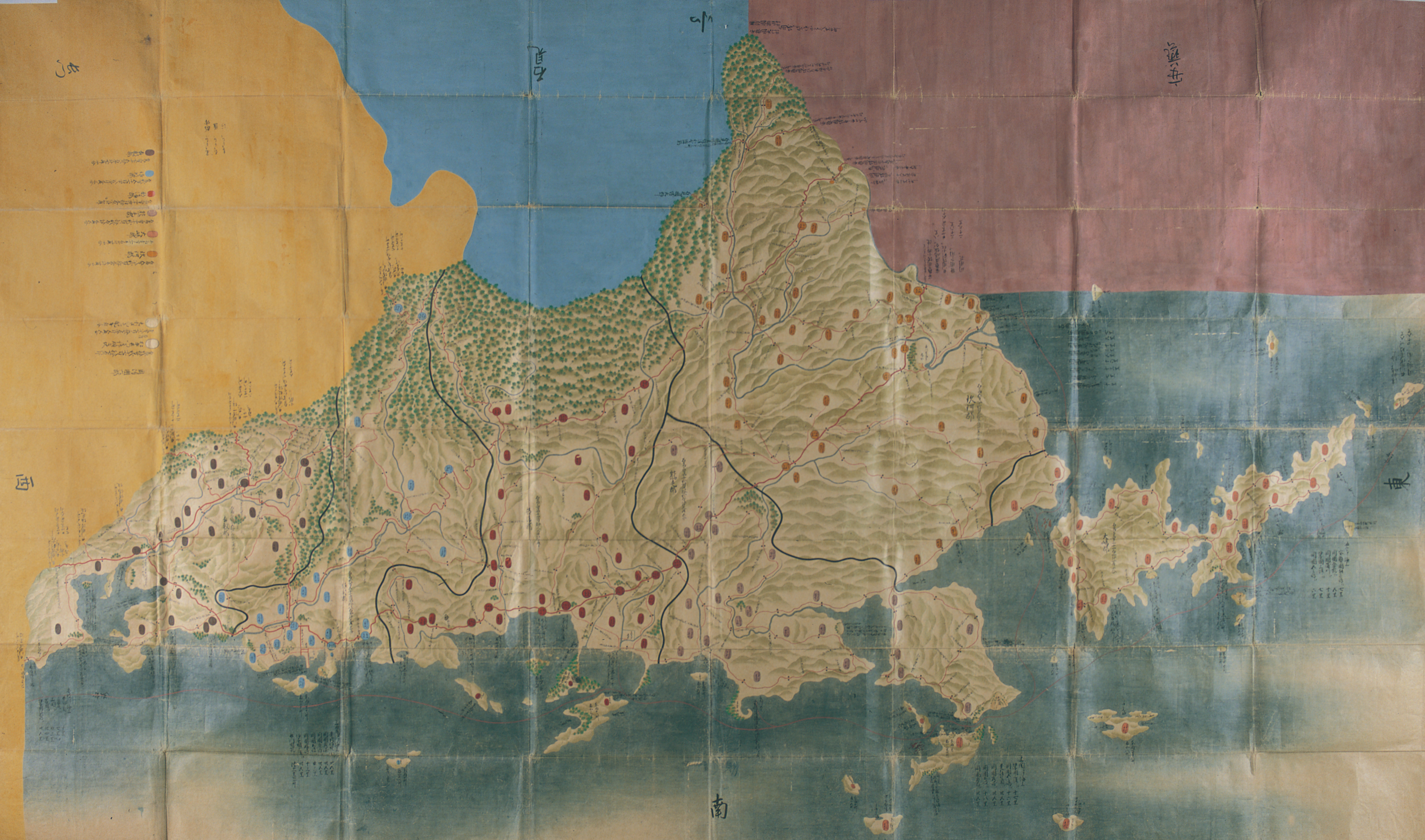
Shōhō Kuniezu - Suō Province, with Nagato in yellow, Iwami in blue, and Aki in pink

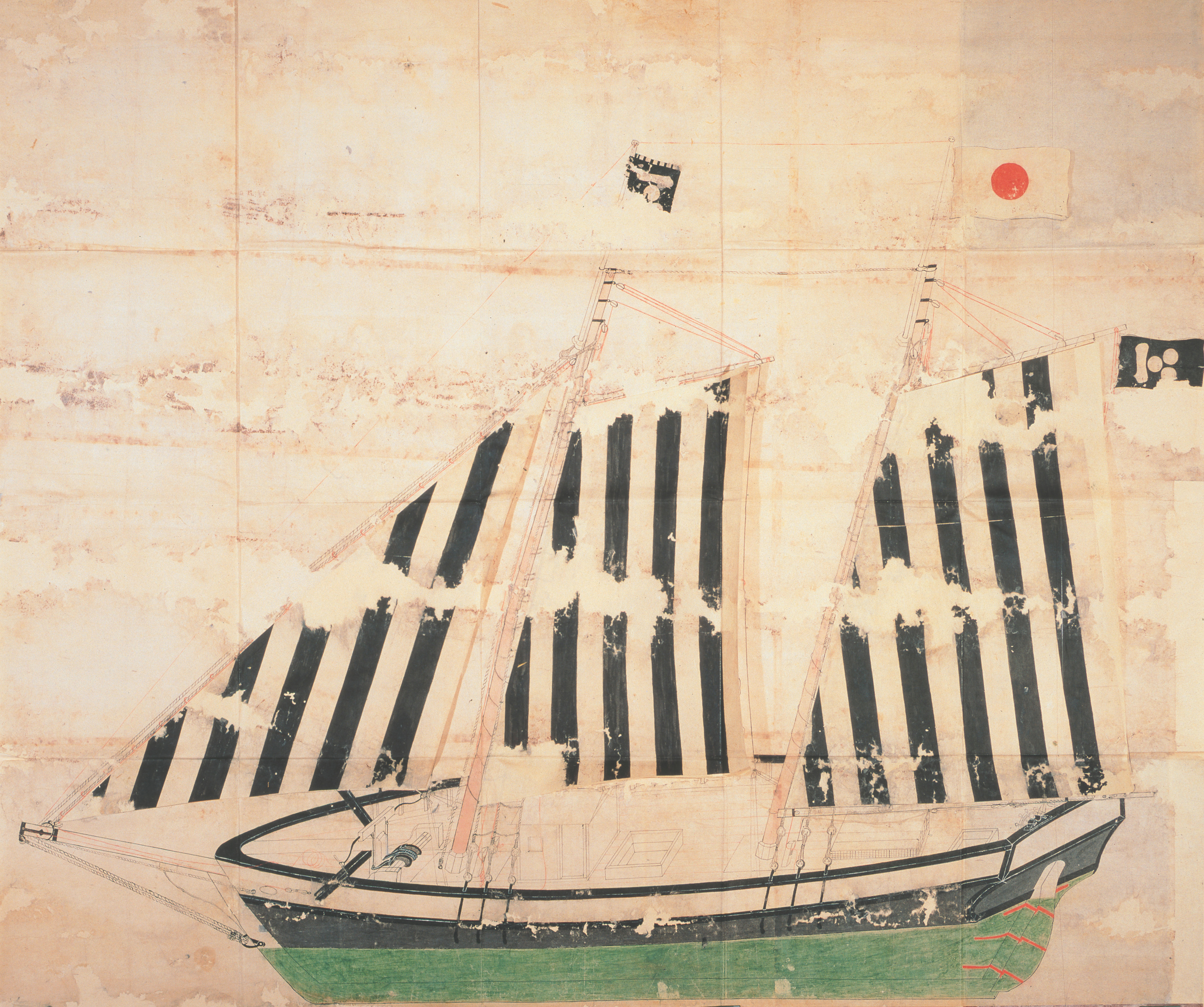
Heishin-maru (丙辰丸)

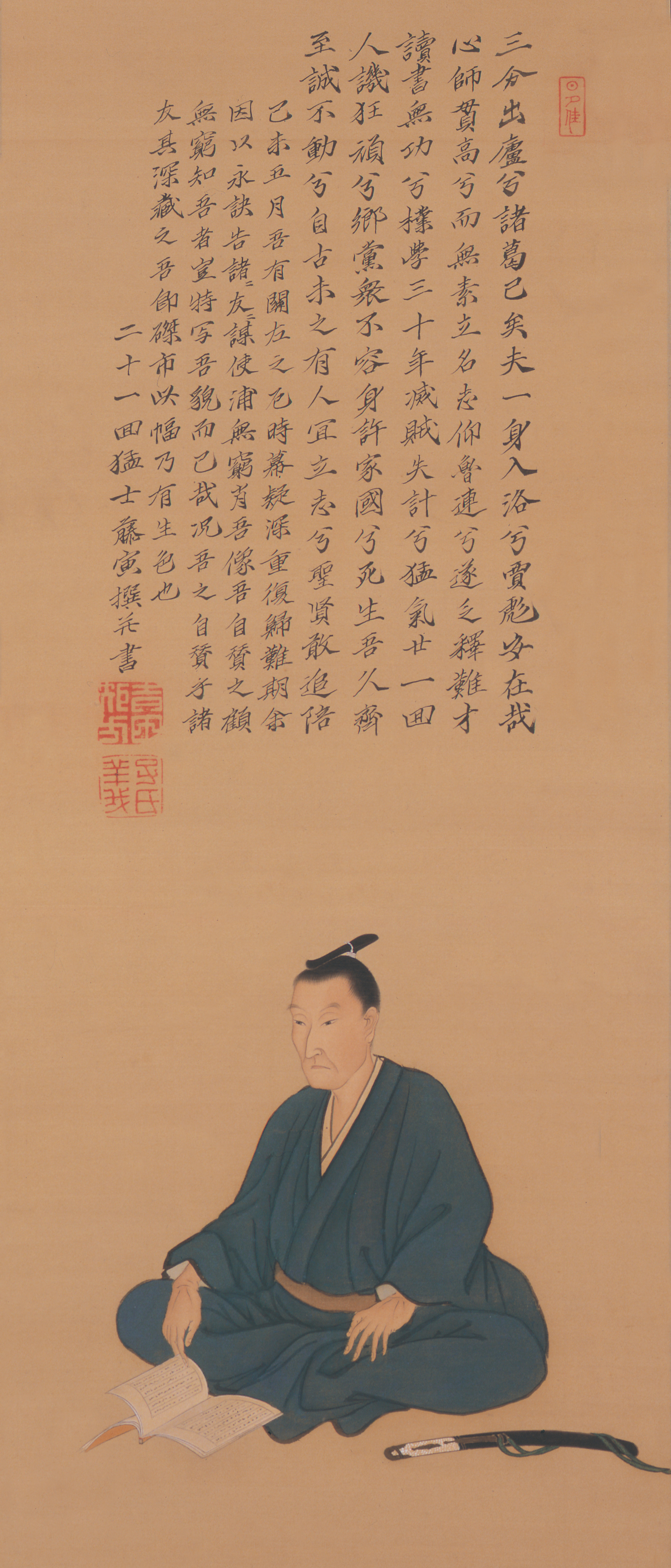
Yoshida Shōin

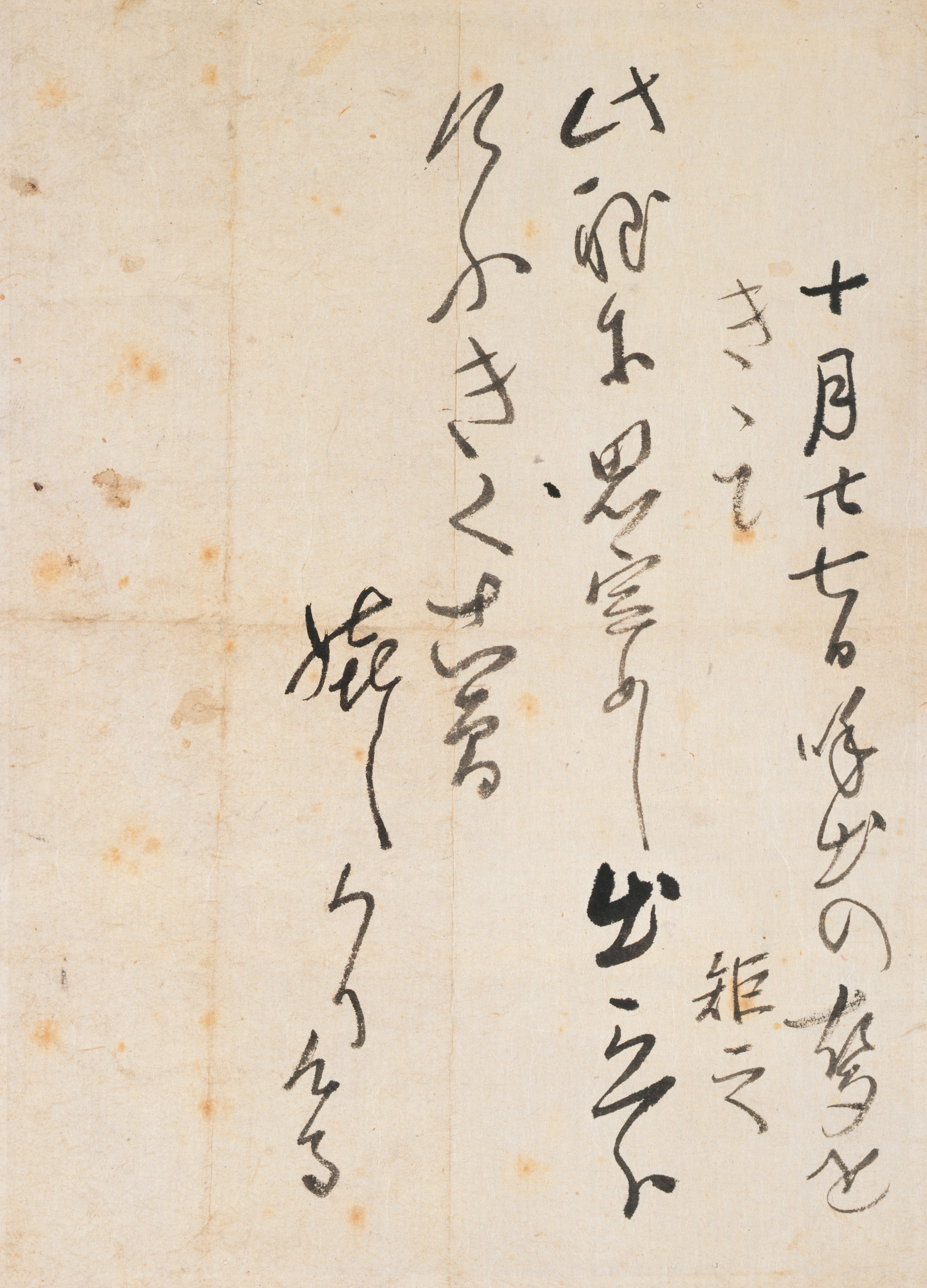
Zeppitsu or "last writing" of Yoshida Shōin

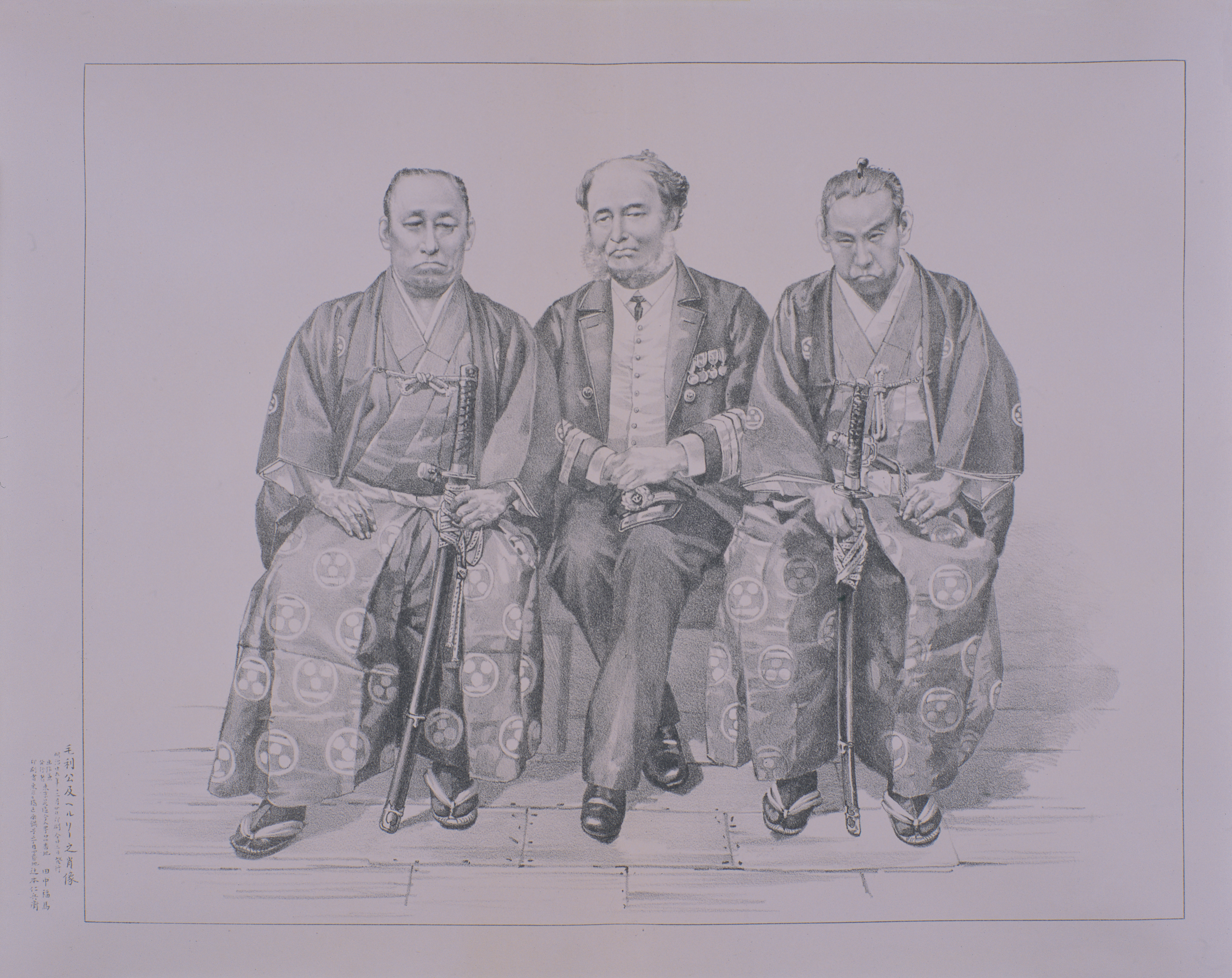
Meeting of Vice-Admiral George King, Mōri Takachika, and Mōri Motonori in 1867

== See also ==
- List of archives in Japan
- Yamaguchi Prefectural Museum
- List of Historic Sites of Japan (Yamaguchi)
- Cultural Property (Japan)
