= David Howell (historian) =

American historian of Japan

- Born: Hilo, Hawai'i
- Occupation: Historian
- Known for: Social, cultural, and economic history of early modern Japan

Academic background
- Education: University of Hawaiʻi at Hilo (BA); Princeton University (PhD)

Academic work
- Discipline: History
- Sub-discipline: History of Japan
- Institutions: University of Texas at Austin; Princeton University; Harvard University
- Notable works: Capitalism from Within (1995) Geographies of Identity in Nineteenth-Century Japan (2005)

David Luke Howell is an American historian specializing in the social, cultural, and economic history of early modern Japan. He is the Robert K. and Dale J. Weary Professor of Japanese History at Harvard University, where he holds a joint appointment in the Department of History and the Department of East Asian Languages and Civilizations.

Howell's scholarship focuses on the transformation of social relations, economic life, and identity in Japan from the Tokugawa period (1603–1868) into the modern era. His work is regarded as influential in shifting the historiography of Japan toward regional and translocal perspectives.

== Academic career ==
Howell was raised in Hilo, Hawai'i, and received his Bachelor of Arts degree from the University of Hawai'i at Hilo. He subsequently studied in Japan at Hokkaido University, where he developed an interest in regional Japanese history, particularly that of northern Japan.

Howell completed his doctoral studies in history at Princeton University, studying under Marius Jansen, and began his academic career at the University of Texas at Austin, where he taught from 1989 to 1992. In 1993, he joined the faculty of Princeton University, where he remained until 2010. At Princeton, he held the Nissan Professorship in Japanese Studies and was associated with the university's Program in East Asian Studies.

In 2010, Howell was appointed professor of Japanese history at Harvard University. He was later named the Robert K. and Dale J. Weary Professor of Japanese History. At Harvard, he has held several administrative and leadership roles, including chair of the Department of East Asian Languages and Civilizations.

In addition to his teaching and administrative work, Howell has served as editor of the Harvard Journal of Asiatic Studies, one of the leading journals in the field.

== Scholarship ==
Howell's research centers on the social and economic transformations of Japan between the seventeenth and nineteenth centuries, with particular attention to how local and regional dynamics shaped broader historical change.

A central theme in his work is the critique of nation-centered narratives. Howell has emphasized the importance of examining peripheral regions, most notably Hokkaido and northern Japan, to understand processes of state formation, identity construction, and economic development.

His scholarship has also contributed to the study of status groups and marginalized populations in early modern Japan, highlighting how social categories were historically constructed and contested. He is especially interested in how social transformations affected ordinary people and daily life over the course of the nineteenth century.

In later work, Howell has explored environmental and material history, including research on waste, recycling, and urban infrastructure in Tokugawa and Meiji Japan. These studies have linked everyday practices to broader transformations in governance and social organization.

In addition to his own research, Howell served as editor of the second volume of The New Cambridge History of Japan, a multi-volume reference work published by Cambridge University Press.

== Awards and honors ==
- Social Science Research Council Grant, 1991
- Japan Foundation Research Fellowship, 1992
- Fulbright Fellowship, 1997-98
- National Endowment for the Humanities Fellowship, 2007-08

== Selected bibliography ==
=== Books ===
- Howell, David L. (1995). Capitalism from Within: Economy, Society, and the State in a Japanese Fishery. Berkeley: University of California Press.
- Howell, David L. (2005). Geographies of Identity in Nineteenth-Century Japan. Berkeley: University of California Press.

=== Edited volumes ===
- Howell, David L. (2024). The New Cambridge History of Japan, Volume 2: Early Modern Japan in Asia and the World. Cambridge University Press.

=== Selected journal articles ===
- Howell, David L. (1992). "Proto-Industrial Origins of Japanese Capitalism". Journal of Asian Studies. 51 (2): 269–286.
- Howell, David L. (1994). "Ainu Ethnicity and the Boundaries of the Early Modern Japanese State". Past & Present (142): 69–93.
- Howell, David L. (1998). "Territoriality and Collective Identity in Tokugawa Japan". Daedalus. 127 (3): 105–132.
- Howell, David L. (2004). "Making "Useful Citizens" of Ainu Subjects in Early Twentieth-Century Japan". Journal of Asian Studies. 63 (1): 5–29.
- Howell, David L. (2014). "Foreign Encounters and Informal Diplomacy in Early Modern Japan". Journal of Japanese Studies. 40 (2): 295–327.
