= David Howell (cricketer) =

South African cricketer (born 1958)

Personal information
- Born: 20 May 1958 (age 68); Port Elizabeth, South Africa
- Source: Cricinfo, 6 December 2020

David Howell (born 20 May 1958) is a South African cricketer. He played in 80 first-class and 44 List A matches from 1976/77 to 1992/93.
