= The Cambridge History of Japan =

Multi-volume work by Delmer Brown

- Edition 1 cover
- Author: John Whitney Hall, Marius Jansen, Madoka Kanai, Denis Twitchett (eds.)
- Country: United Kingdom
- Language: English
- Genre: Japanese history
- Publisher: Cambridge University Press
- Published: 1988–1999
- No. of books: 6

The Cambridge History of Japan is a multi-volume survey of Japanese history published by Cambridge University Press (CUP). This was the first major collaborative synthesis presenting the current state of knowledge of Japanese history. The series aims to present as full a view of Japanese history as possible. The collaborative work brings together the writing of Japanese specialists and historians of Japan.

== History ==
Plans for the project were initiated in the 1970s; and the first of the volumes was published in 1988.

The general editor, John Whitney Hall, was expressly focused on the task of identifying arrays of relationships in Japanese history—such as, for example, between the chronology of military exploits in the 16th century and an account of consequences which developed over time.

The several volumes include:

- Vol. 1. Ancient Japan, edited by Delmer Brown (1993)
- Vol. 2. Heian Japan, edited by Donald Shively and William H. McCullough (1999)
- Vol. 3. Medieval Japan, edited by Kozo Yamamura (1990)
- Vol. 4. Early modern Japan, edited by John Whitney Hall and James McClain (1991)
- Vol. 5. The Nineteenth Century, edited by Marius Jansen (1989)
- Vol. 6. The Twentieth Century, edited by Peter Duus (1988)

== See also ==
- The New Cambridge History of Japan
