= Nonoka =

- Gender: Female

Origin
- Origin: Japanese
- Meaning: Different meanings depending on the kanji used

Nonoka (written: 野々花, 乃々華 or ののか in hiragana) is a feminine Japanese given name. Notable people with the name include:

- Nonoka Akaki (赤木 野々花; born 1990), Japanese announcer and newscaster
- Nonoka Kazami (風見 和香; born 2007), Japanese member of the Shiritsu Ebisu Chugaku
- Nonoka Murakata (村方 乃々佳; born 2018), Japanese child prodigy and singer
- Nonoka Ono (おの ののか; born 1991), Japanese entertainer and gravure idol
- Nonoka Ozaki (尾崎 野乃香; born 2003), Japanese freestyle wrestler
- Nonoka Yamaguchi (山口 乃々華; born 1998), Japanese singer and member of the girl group E-girls

== Fictional characters ==
- Nonoka Komiya (古宮 乃々香), protagonist of the anime series Celestial Method
- Nonoka Masaki (間咲 ののか), a character in the video game Photo Kano
