= Nagato Province =

Former province of Japan

Map of Japanese provinces (1868) with Nagato Province highlighted

Nagato Province (長門国, Nagato no Kuni), (Note: Japanese pronunciation: [nä́.ɡä̀.tò̞ (nò̞ kɯ̈̀.ɲ̟ì), nä́.ŋä̀.tò̞ (nò̞ kɯ̈̀.ɲ̟ì), nä̀.ɡä́.tó̞ (nó̞ kɯ̈́.ɲ̟í), nä̀.ŋä́.tó̞ (nó̞ kɯ̈́.ɲ̟í)]) often called Chōshū (長州), (Note: Japanese pronunciation: [c̟͡ɕó̞ò̞.ɕɨ̀ɨ̀]) was a province of Japan. It was at the extreme western end of Honshū, in the area that is today Yamaguchi Prefecture. Nagato bordered on Iwami and Suō Provinces.

== History ==
Although the ancient capital of the province was Shimonoseki, Hagi was the seat of the Chōshū han (fief or domain) during the Edo period. Nagato was ruled by the Mōri clan before and after the Battle of Sekigahara.

In 1871 with the abolition of feudal domains and the establishment of prefectures (Haihan Chiken) after the Meiji Restoration, the provinces of Nagato and Suō were combined to eventually establish Yamaguchi Prefecture. At the same time, the province continued to exist for some purposes. For example, Nagato is explicitly recognized in treaties in 1894 (a) between Japan and the United States and (b) between Japan and the United Kingdom.

Historically, the oligarchy that came into power after the Meiji Restoration of 1868 had a strong representation from the Chōshū province, as Itō Hirobumi, Yamagata Aritomo, and Kido Kōin were from there. Other natives famous for their role in the restoration include Yoshida Shōin, Takasugi Shinsaku, and Kusaka Genzui among others.

The Japanese battleship Nagato was named after this province.

== Shrines and temples ==
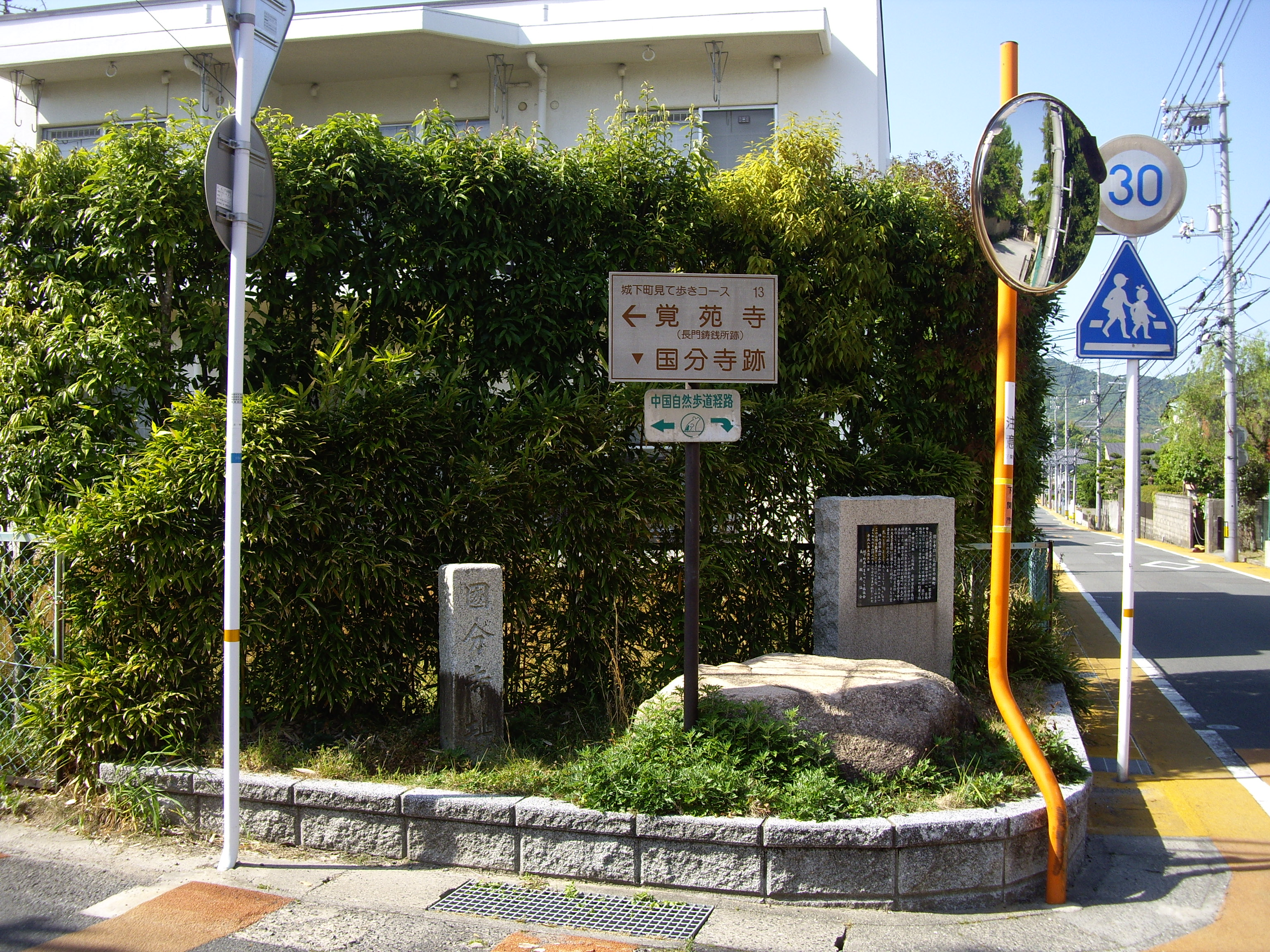
Nagato Kokubun-ji Site in Shimonoseki

Sumiyoshi jinja was the chief Shinto shrine (ichinomiya) of Nagato.

== Historical districts ==
- Yamaguchi Prefecture
  - Abu District (阿武郡) - absorbed Mishima District on April 1, 1896
  - Asa District (厚狭郡) - dissolved
  - Mine District (美祢郡) - dissolved
  - Mishima District (見島郡) - merged into Abu District on April 1, 1896
  - Ōtsu District (大津郡) - dissolved
  - Toyoura District (豊浦郡) - dissolved

== Maps ==
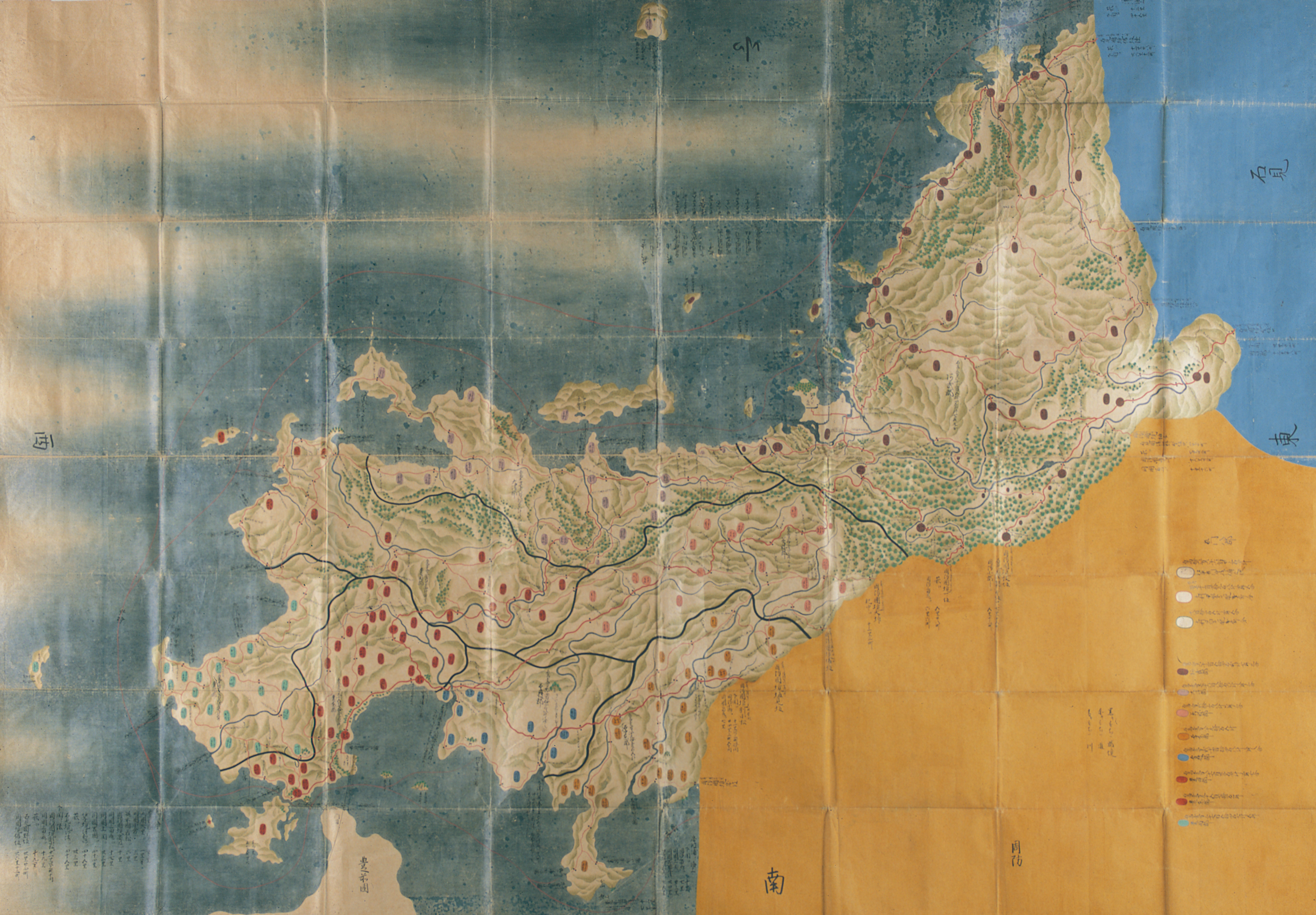
Shōhō Kuniezu - Nagato Province, with Suō in yellow and Iwami in blue (Yamaguchi Prefectural Archives)

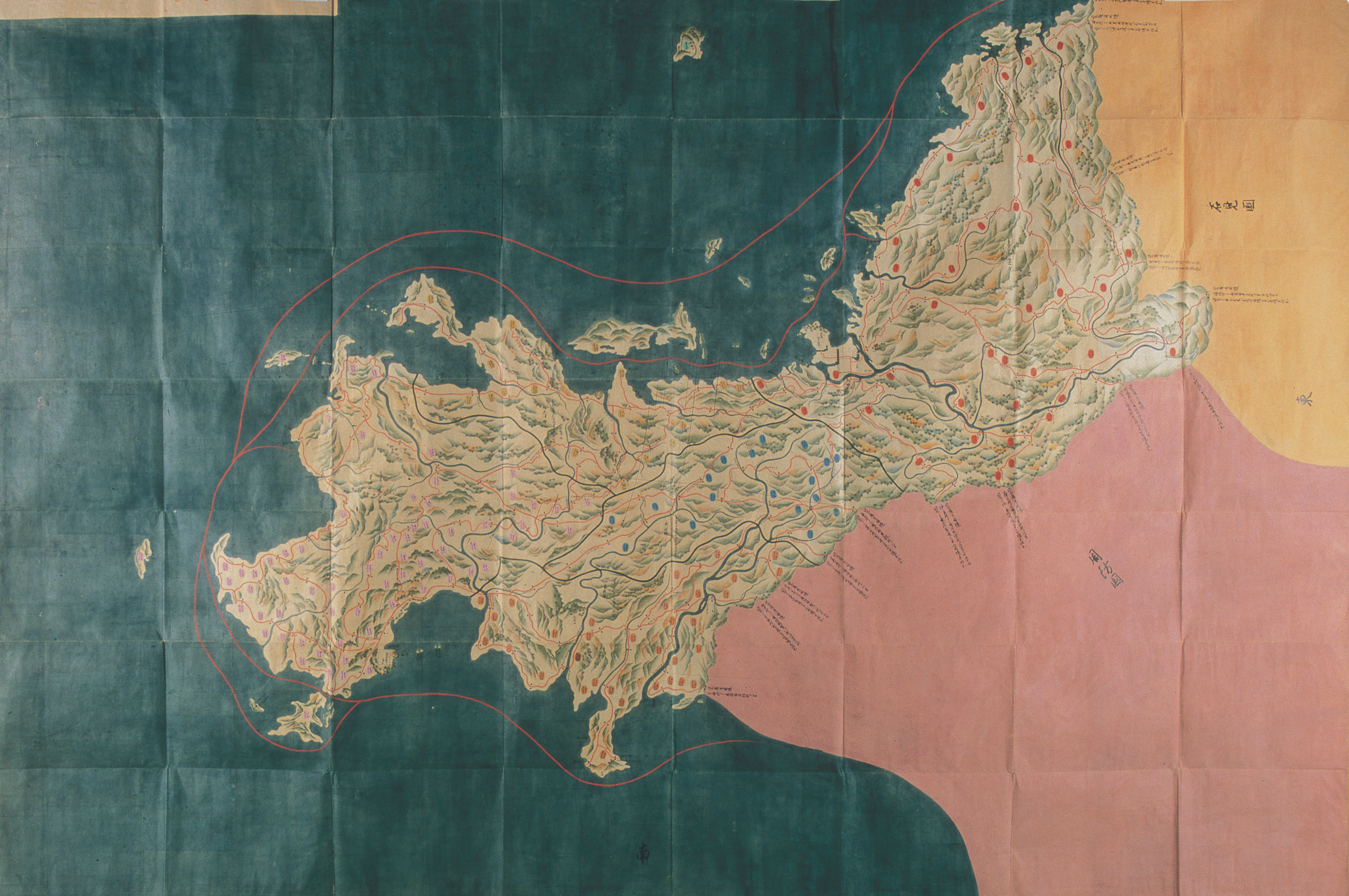
Genroku Kuniezu - Nagato Province, with Suō in pink and Iwami in yellow (Yamaguchi Prefectural Archives)

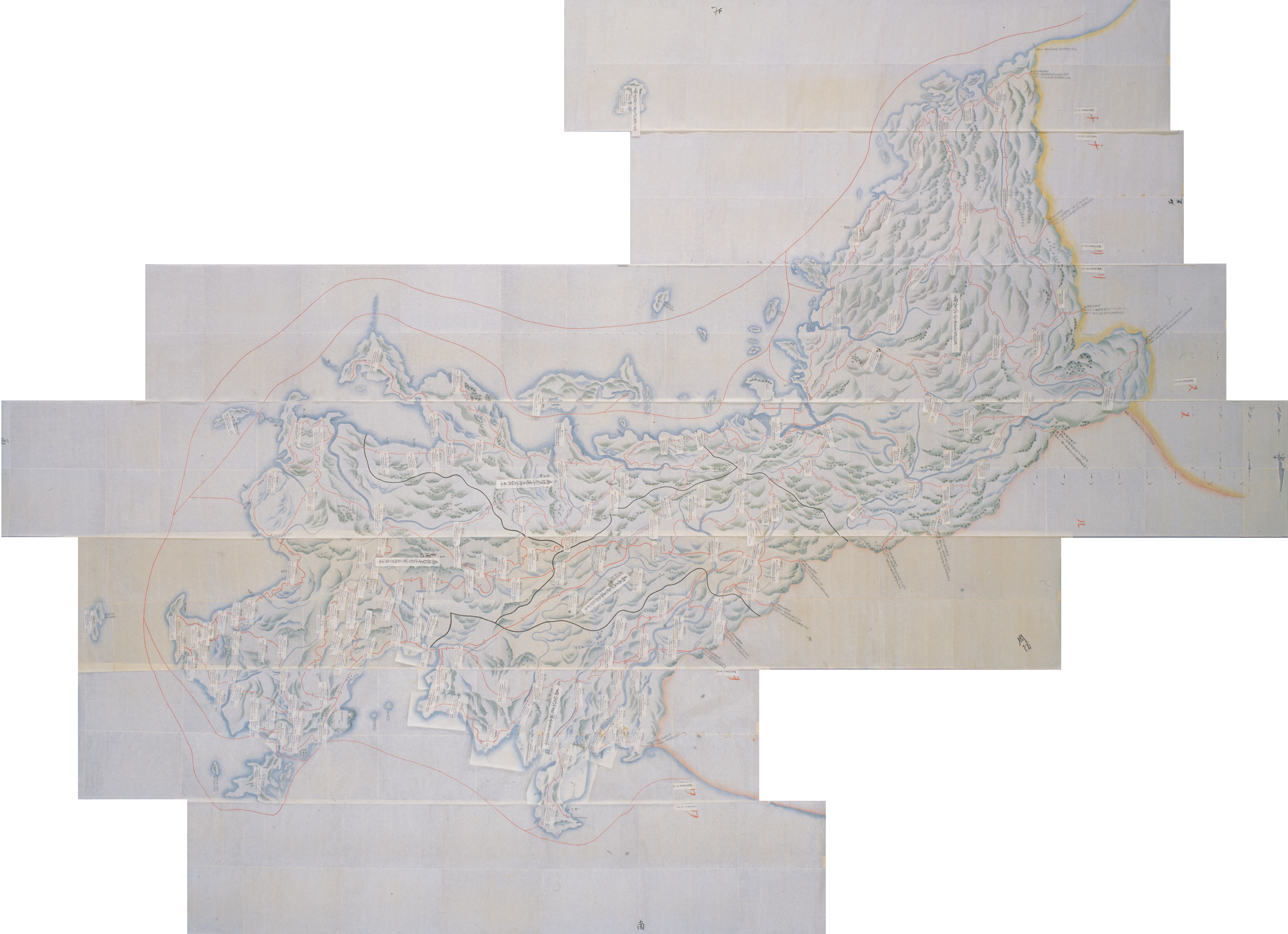
Tenpō Kuniezu - Nagato Province (Yamaguchi Prefectural Archives)

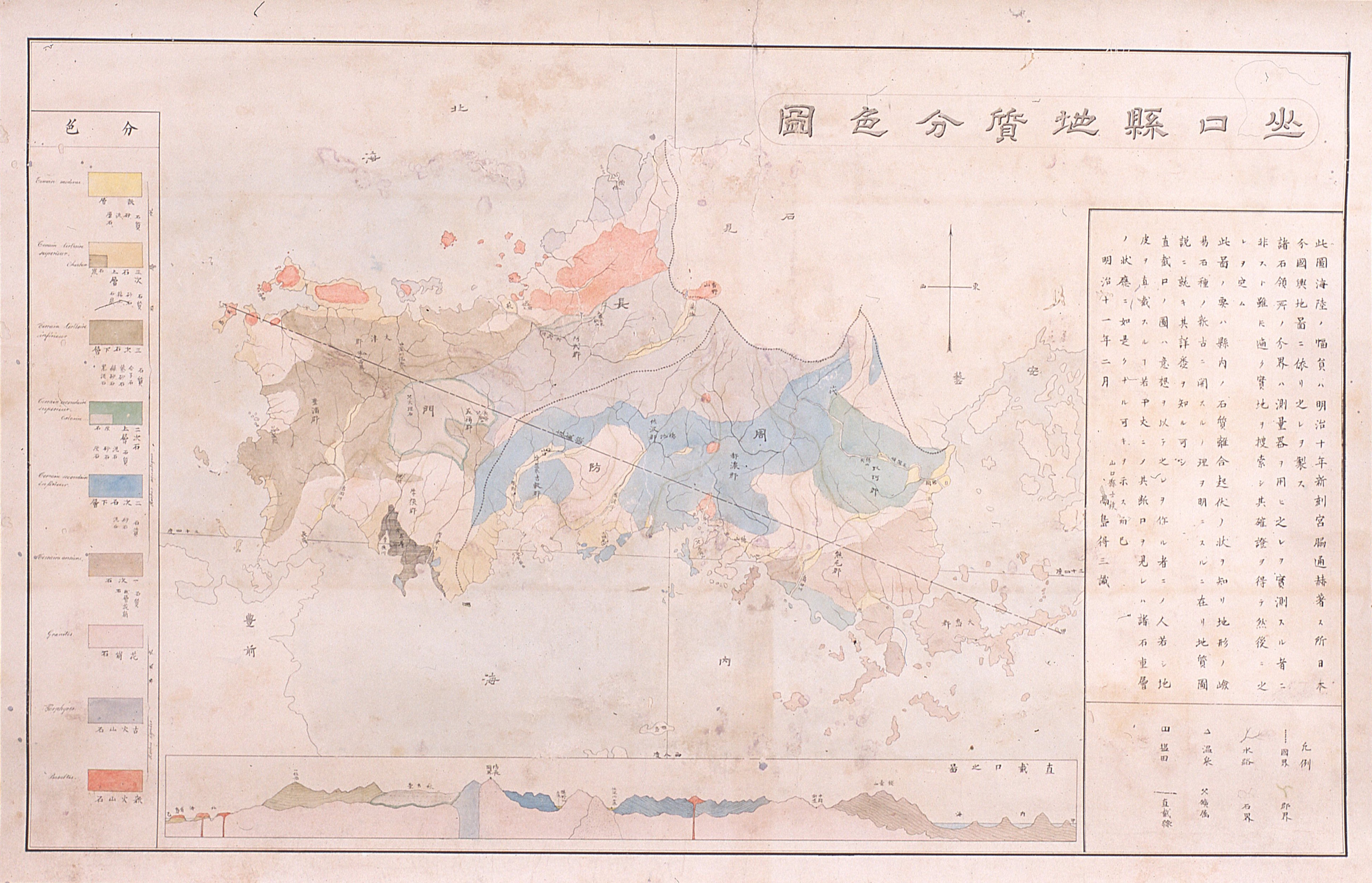
1878 map of Yamaguchi Prefecture, marked with its two constituent provinces of Nagato (長門) and Suō (周防), as well as neighbouring Iwami (石見) and Aki (安藝) (Yamaguchi Prefectural Archives)

== See also ==
- List of Historic Sites of Japan (Yamaguchi)
- Chōshū Five
- Nagato City

== Bibliography ==
- Nussbaum, Louis-Frédéric and Käthe Roth. (2005). Japan encyclopedia. Cambridge: Harvard University Press. ISBN 978-0-674-01753-5; OCLC 58053128
- Papinot, Edmond. (1910). Historical and Geographic Dictionary of Japan. Tokyo: Librarie Sansaisha. OCLC 77691250
