= Kobe City Archives =

Coordinates: 34°42′29.18″N 135°12′8.33″E

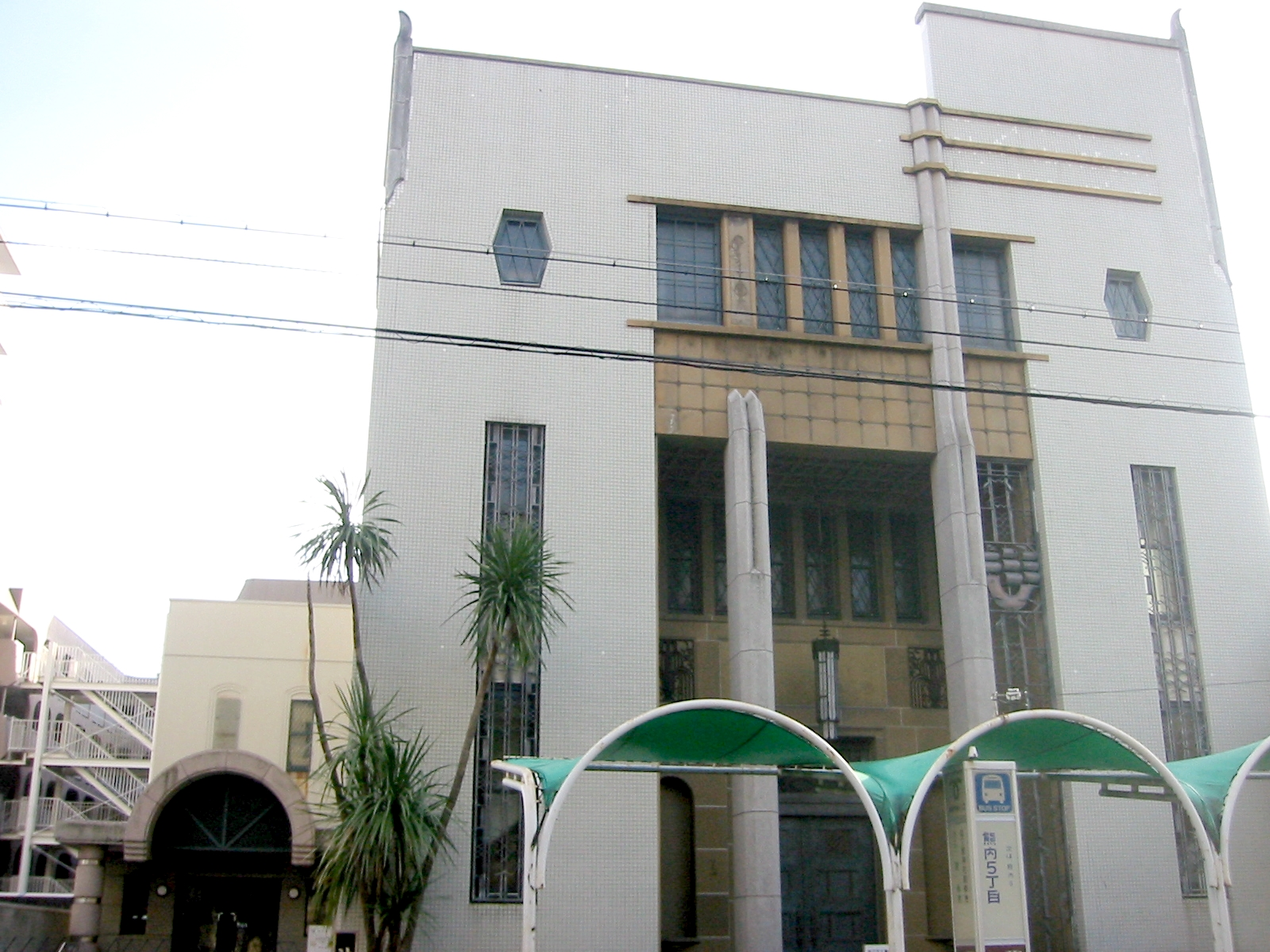
- Kobe City Archives building
- Location: Kobe, Hyogo Prefecture, Japan
- Established: 1989

Other information
- Website: Kobe City Archives

The Kobe City Archives (神戸市文書館, Kōbe-shi Bunshokan) is the archive of the city of Kobe in Japan. The building containing the archive is currently located in the Chuo district of Kobe, near Shin-Kobe Station. The building is in Art Deco style, and was recognised as a "significant building" in 2000.

== Archived items ==
Archived items include:

- English language newspapers:
  - The Hiogo and Osaka Herald (4 January 1868 to March 1870)
  - The Hiogo News (23 April 1868 to 30 December 1887)
  - The Kobe Chronicle (3 July 1897 to 31 December 1901)
  - The Japan Chronicle (8 January 1902 to 26 December 1912)
- Japan Gazette Official Directory from 1868 to the early 20th Century
- Japanese Newspapers in the Archives include,
  - Kobe Shinpo
  - Kobe Nippo
  - Kobe Shimbun
  - Asahi Shimbun Hyogo Edition
  - Shinko Hyogo Shinbun
- Records from the Kobe foreign settlement and court records from that period (in both English and Japanese)
