= Madoka Kanai =

Japanese historian (1927–2001)

Madoka Kanai (金井 圓; Shinjitai: 金井 円, Kanai Madoka; 5 June 1927 – 7 July 2001) was a Japanese historian at the University of Tokyo who specialized in modern Japanese history, with a special interest in the history of Japanese foreign relations. He was formerly Director of the Japan-Netherlands Institute and President of the Historiographical Institute of the University of Tokyo.

Kanai was born in Nagano Prefecture and educated at the University of Tokyo.

== Selected bibliography ==
In Japanese

- Hansei (藩政; "Domain Administration", 1962)
- O-yatoi Gaikokujin: Jinbun Kagaku (お雇い外国人 人文科学; "Hired Foreigners: Humanities", 1976), part of a series
- Nichi-ran kōshōshi no Kenkyū (日蘭交渉史の研究; "A Study on the History of Japan-Holland Relationship", 1986)
- Kinsei Nihon to Oranda (近世日本とオランダ; "Early Modern Japan and Holland", 1993)

In English

- A Japanese Historian Visits the U.S.A. (1960)
- A Diary of William Cleveland: Captain's Clerk on Board the Massachusetts (1965), transcribed and annotated by Madoka Kanai
- A Topical History of Japan (1966, with Hideharu Nitta and Joseph K. Yamagiwa)
- The Cambridge History of Japan (1988–1999, general editor with John Whitney Hall, Marius B. Jansen, and Denis Twitchett)

Kanai also translated several books into Japanese, such as Matthew C. Perry's The Japan Expedition, 1852–1854 and Otis Manchester Poole's Death of Old Yokohoma.
