= Kuniezu =

A Tempō Kuniezu map of the Takada Domain and Nagaoka Domain

The kuniezu (国絵図) were a series of Japanese provincial land maps, created during the Edo period, which the Tokugawa shogunate ordered be created by every province. They are sometimes contrasted with nihonzu (日本図), which were national maps created by the shogunate.

In 1983, two of these map sets—the Genroku Kuniezu and the Tempō Kuniezu—were designated Important Cultural Properties of Japan.

== Shōhō Kuniezu ==
Work on the Shōhō Kuniezu (正保国絵図) was started in 1644 . The original copy was destroyed by fire in 1873 ja:正保国絵図.

== Genroku Kuniezu ==
Work on the Genroku Kuniezu (元禄国絵図) began in 1696 (Genroku 9) and ended in 1702 (Genroku 15). The cadastral survey and mapping project was started and finished in the Genroku era. It was the fourth official map of Japan.

The scale of the maps reduced "ri" (3927m) to 6 "sun" (18 cm) [about 1/21,600 scale]. Each map showed mountains, rivers, roads and other landmarks. Road milestones and names of villages with recognized yields of rice were recorded. Castle towns were recorded with the names of local areas and names of the lords of the castles.

The maps served as a comprehensive record of the region's statistics with legends showing colours of the counties and colour coding the yield of rice achieved from each county. Some maps even featured gridlines and the number of villages in each county featured on the bottom of the maps.

Some considered this set of maps as inferior to the previous ones which had been ordered. The Genroku maps were corrected in 1719 (Kyōhō 4).

This was the first complete set of provincial maps that included both Ezo and the Ryūkyū Kingdom, which at that time, was a vassal state of the Satsuma Domain.

== Tempō Kuniezu ==
Work on the Tempō Kuniezu (天保国絵図) started in 1835 and ended in 1838.
