= Revolt of Ashikaga Yoshiaki =

Military conflict

- Part of Momoyama period
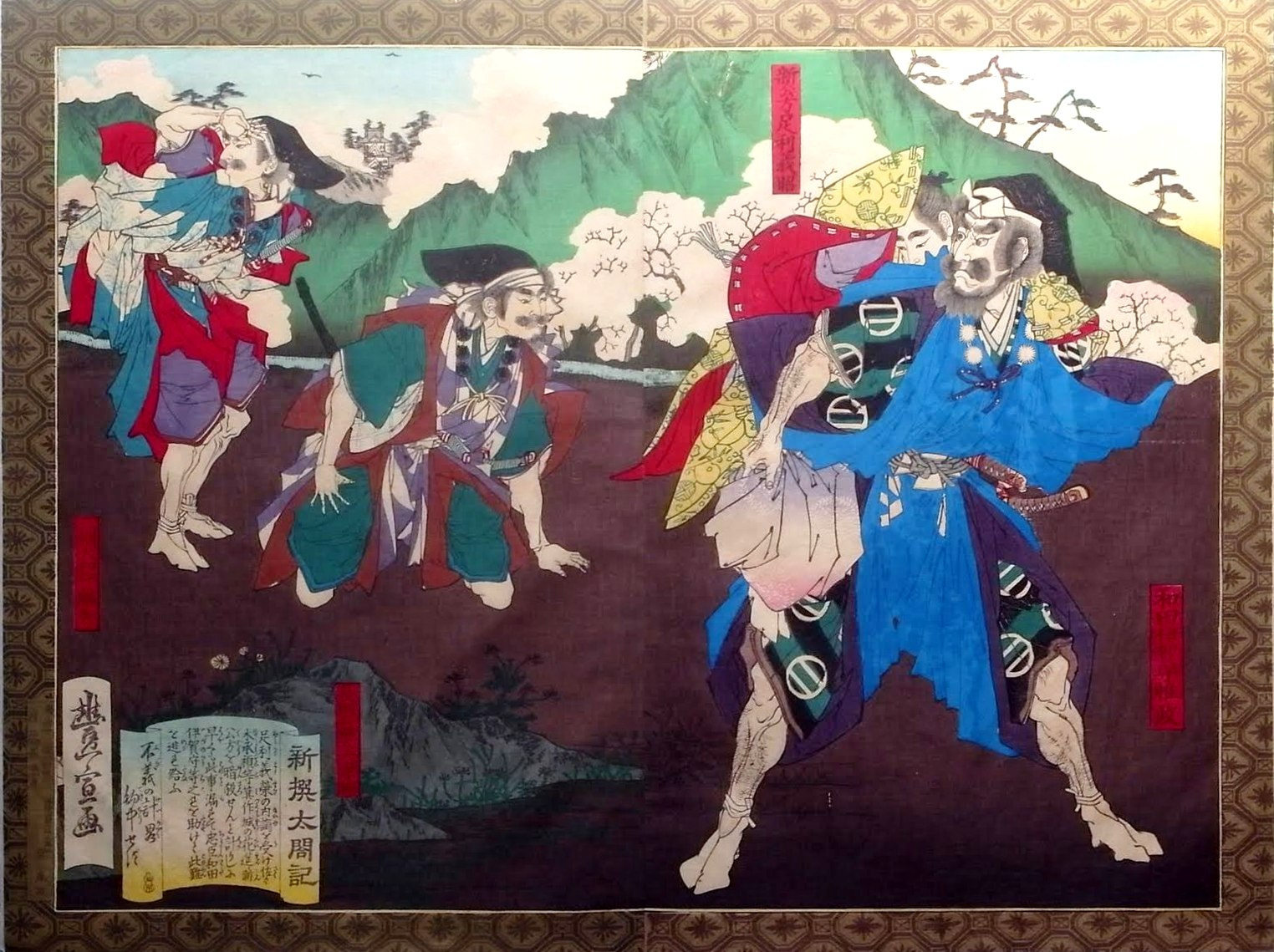
- An Ukiyo-e painting of Ashikaga Yoshiaki escaping, painted by Utagawa Toyonobu, 1884.
Date	July 1573
Location	Kyoto 35.0259°N 135.7616°E
Result	Oda Nobunaga victory

Belligerents
Ashikaga Yoshiaki and Ashikaga clan Matsunaga clan Takeda Shingen	Oda Nobunaga and Oda clan

Strength
Unknown	30,000 soldiers
- Location within Kyoto Prefecture Revolt of Ashikaga Yoshiaki (Japan)

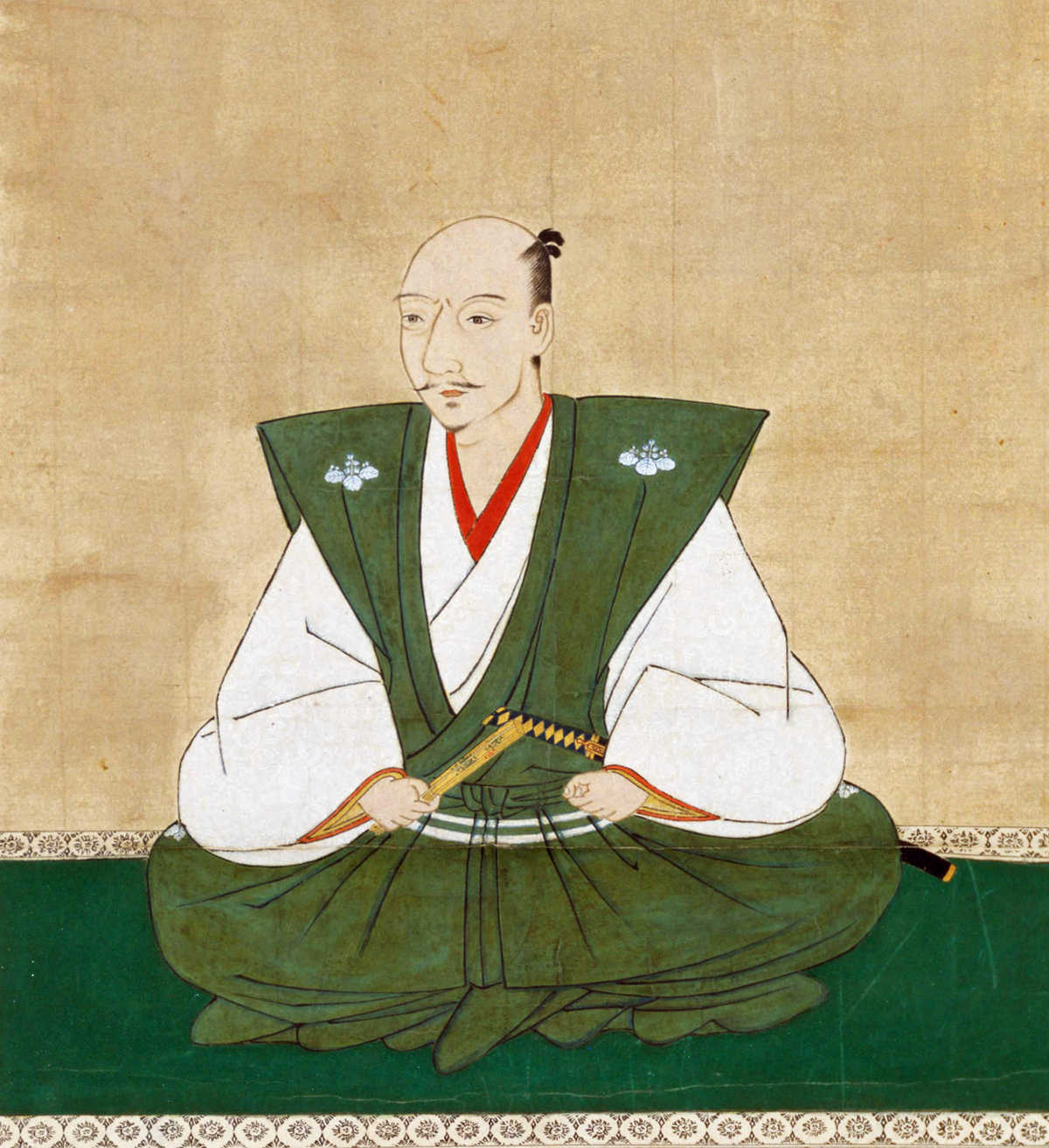
Oda Nobunaga, painted by Kanō Sōshū, 1583.

The Revolt of Ashikaga Yoshiaki (Japanese: 足利義昭の乱) or better known as Nobunaga Encirclement (信長包囲網) took place in 1573 and was led by Ashikaga Yoshiaki, the 15th Shogun of Japan and its last Shogun from the Ashikaga clan. Yoshiaki became shogun in 1568 with the support of Oda Nobunaga. The Oda clan's forces entered Kyoto, restoring the Muromachi shogunate. This takeover was swift due to the lack of effective central authority in Kyoto at the time. Yoshiaki then acted as a puppet leader under Nobunaga's direct control.

In 1573, Yoshiaki revolted against Nobunaga, seeking to establish his own control. To aid him in the uprising, Yoshiaki called upon the Takeda and Matsunaga clans. Yoshiaki attempted to flee Kyoto and find refuge in Sakai. Despite his efforts, Nobunaga pursued Yoshiaki and recaptured Kyoto, effectively ending the Ashikaga clan's rule.

== Background ==
The Ashikaga clan ruled Japan for around 240 years, from 1333 to 1573. However, by the mid-16th century, their authority and influence had started to decline, leading to a loss of respect and reputation. Several regions of Japan ignored the clan's rule and that of the shogun. Nevertheless, different factions, including the Oda clan and the Imagawa clan, competed for control of the central government, acknowledging its continued significance and power.

In 1564, Ashikaga Yoshiteru, the 13th shogun of Japan and brother of Yoshiaki, faced internal strife as he sought to consolidate his power and gain support from other clans in Japan. His primary adversary was the Hosokawa clan. In 1565, Matsunaga Hisahide sent his son Matsunaga Hisamichi and Miyoshi Yoshitsugu to besiege Yoshiteru's castle, now known as Nijō Castle, and carry out a coup d'état. The castle was surrounded, compelling Yoshiteru to commit seppuku.

In his account of the overthrow of Ashikaga Yoshiteru, Jesuit missionary Father Luís Fróis mentioned the strong homosexual relationship between Yoshiteru and his squire, Odachidono. According to Father Fróis, the shōgun's squire, Odachidono:

fought so valiantly and with such intrepid spirit that all the rebels started to shout out that he should not be killed, but that he should be taken alive. Nonetheless, seeing his master die, and believing it a great dishonour to survive him, the youth threw away his sword, and pulling out his dagger, he cut open his throat and then his belly. Finally he killed himself by lying down flat with the dagger in his belly.

Following Yoshiteru's death, Hisahide and the Hosokawa clan orchestrated the appointment of Ashikaga Yoshihide as the new shogun, with the intention of using him as a figurehead. However, Yoshihide's authority gradually diminished, creating a power vacuum in Kyoto that both Nobunaga and Yoshiaki sought to exploit. Yoshiaki aimed to overthrow Yoshihide. By 1568, Yoshihide's authority had significantly diminished. This prompted Yoshiaki to propose an alliance with Nobunaga, who also had ambitions to control Kyoto. However, Matsunaga Hisahide apprehended Yoshiaki and confined him at Kofuku-ji Temple. Legend has it that Hisahide spared Yoshiaki out of reverence for the temple grounds. Yoshiaki's brother Kakukei was promised a future role as Bettō of the temple.

Yoshiaki subsequently managed to flee Kyoto and seek refuge in Ōmi Province with the aid of Rokkaku Yoshikata and Rokkaku Yoshiharu. After discovering Yoshiaki's location, Nobunaga helped him move to Yoshizumi Takeda in Wakasa Province in August 1568. They managed to avoid detection by Yoshiharu's associates from the Miyoshi-Sanninshu faction. Later, Yoshiaki found refuge in Mino Province, thanks to Akechi Mitsuhide and Nobunaga.

With Nobunaga's backing, Yoshiaki emerged from hiding and formed an alliance to plan their rise to power. Their main opponent before advancing on Kyoto was the Rokkaku clan. When Nobunaga asked the Rokkaku clan for help in the invasion, they refused and chose to fight against his forces instead. The Rokkaku clan was defeated and forced to retreat to Kannonji Castle in Koga Province. Nobunaga's forces quickly captured Kyoto and installed Yoshiaki as the 15th shogun.

== Revolt (1572 - 1573) ==
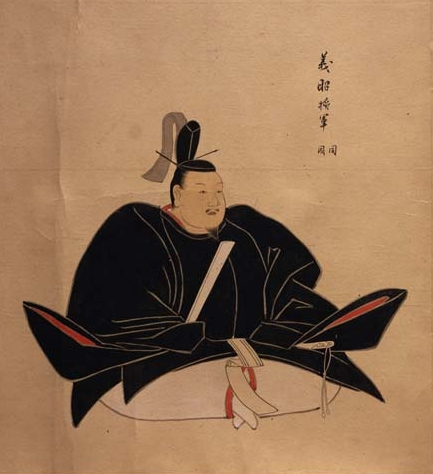
Ashikaga Yoshiaki, painted by Sadanobu Matsudaira (松平定信 (編)).

=== Yoshiaki's dissatisfaction ===
In January 1569, Nobunaga introduced the 'Denchu on'okite', a set of nine articles, which he compelled Yoshiaki to accept. He followed this with an additional seven articles in January 1570. By 1572, Yoshiaki became dissatisfied with his level of authority. Initially grateful towards Nobunaga, he addressed him as 'my father ODA Danjo no Chu (Nobunaga)' in a thank-you letter dated October 24. Despite maintaining an amicable relationship by offering Nobunaga positions such as vice shogun and Kanrei, tensions arose as Nobunaga started to curtail the Shogun's power.

=== Siege and revolt ===
In 1573, five years into his tenure as shogun, Yoshiaki initiated a siege against Nobunaga under the directive of the monk Kennyo. Azai Nagamasa, Matsunaga Hisahide, Miyoshi Yoshitsugu, and others also participated in the siege against Nobunaga, while Asakura Shingen and Asakura Yoshikage fought with Nobunaga. Although the siege initially cornered Nobunaga's forces, it was interrupted by the death of Takeda Shingen, who succumbed to an undisclosed illness. After the failed siege, Yoshiaki sought assistance from the Matsunaga clan and formed an alliance with them. In April and July, Yoshiaki and the Matsunaga clan gathered their forces at Makishima Castle, marking the beginning of the revolt. This angered Nobunaga, who marched his armies into Kyoto. According to reports, Nobunaga set fire to Kyoto, forcing Yoshiaki to retreat. Yoshiaki's journey to seek asylum in Sakai, near Osaka, was marred by an incident in which he was robbed by a thief and derided by civilians as a 'poor Kubo' (a destitute court noble). As a result, he renounced his position and became a Buddhist monk, purportedly adopting this guise to conceal his identity while in hiding.

== Aftermath (1573 - 1585) ==
=== Exile in Wakae ===
Following the retreat, Yoshiaki faced a sentence of execution or forced Seppuku. However, thanks to the intervention of the monk Kennyo of the Hōgan-ji Temple, Yoshiaki was banished by Nobunaga to Kawachi Province, specifically Sakai. Despite being ordered to go to Sakai, Yoshiaki fled to Miyoshi Yoshitsugu, one of the leaders of the Miyoshi clan, the feudal lord of the Kawachi region, and Yoshiaki's sister's husband. Yoshiaki spent the next three years as a Buddhist monk in Wakae, where he changed his name to Sho-san, later changing it to Rei-o In. Some sources also suggest he was known as Buke Gosho. Yoshitsugu provided shelter for Yoshiaki in Wakae-Jo castle. In November, several months later, Nobunaga sent troops to destroy Yoshitsugu's castles and undermine him. The Oda forces, led by Sakuma Nobumori, laid siege to Wakae-Jo castle. Yoshitsugu was betrayed by his senior vassals, known as the 'Wakae Triumvirate'. The castle fell quickly, leading Yoshitsugu, his wife, and children to commit Seppuku.

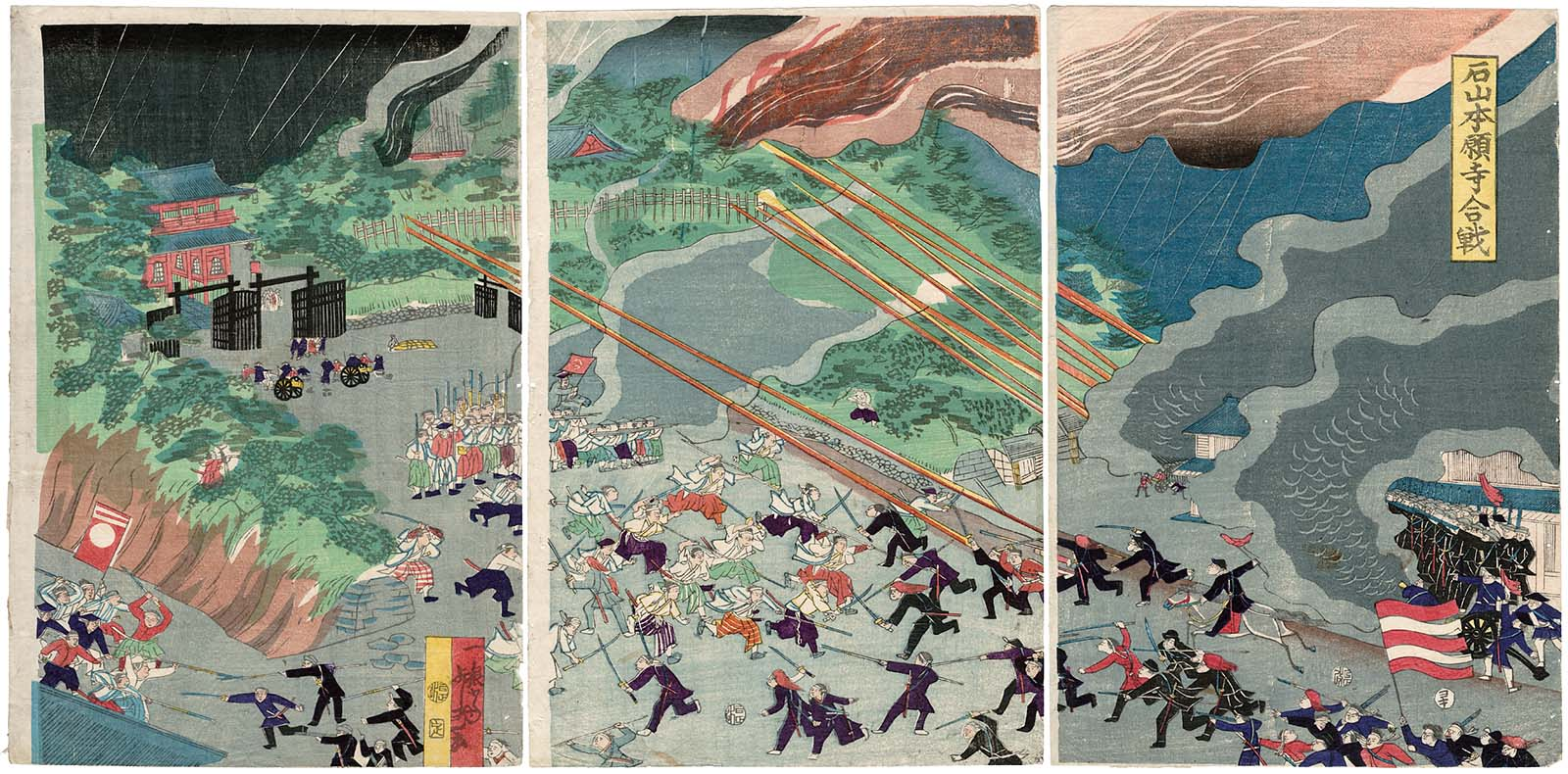
The battle of Ishiyama Hongan-ji, by Utagawa Yoshifuji (1828–1887).

=== Ishiyama Hongan-ji War (1575) ===
In 1570, Oda Nobunaga started a war against the Ikkō-ikki movement, attacking their fortifications, castles, and communities. Yoshiaki, a devout Buddhist, sided with the Ikkō-ikki in their fight against Nobunaga. In early 1575, Yoshiaki requested Mōri Terumoto's help in providing supplies to the Ikkō-ikki. Eventually, Yoshiaki gathered troops from the Iga and Koga provinces to aid the besieged.

=== Yoshiaki's government in exile (1576) ===
Following the revolt and retreat from Kyoto, Yoshiaki refused to relinquish his title as shogun. In 1576, he established a government in exile (Shogunate) at Tomo-No-Ura in the Bingo Province, which was under the Mōri clan domain at that time. During this period, Ashikaga Takauji, a relative of Yoshiaki, provided assistance to Yoshiaki by issuing orders to various feudal lords to suppress Nobunaga.

=== Yoshiaki's resignation (1588) ===
After Nobunaga's suicide in the Honnō-ji Incident of 1582, which took place while he was staying in Tomo, Bingo Province, Yoshiaki tried to return to Kyoto with the help of Mōri Terumoto. He also sought support from Toyotomi Hideyoshi and Shibata Katsuie. However, his relationship with the Mori clan soured due to Kobayakawa Takakage's opposition to aiding Yoshiaki, as Takakage was close to Hideyoshi. Yoshiaki's alignment with Katsuie conflicted with the Mori clan's stance towards Hideyoshi. In 1585, Hideyoshi became the unofficial shogun of Japan. By 1588, Yoshiaki formally relinquished his position as Seii Taishogun and Toyotomi Hideyoshi assumed the title of shogun. Recognized by the Imperial Court, Yoshiaki was granted the title of Jusangu and became a Shozan priest. He also received a fief of 10,000 koku and became the lord of Makishima Castle in Yamashiro Province.
