= Azuchi–Momoyama period =

Period of Japanese history from 1568 to 1600

Oda regime (1573–1585) Toyotomi regime (1585–1603): 織田政権; (1573–1585): 豊臣政権; (1585–1603)
- 1573–1603
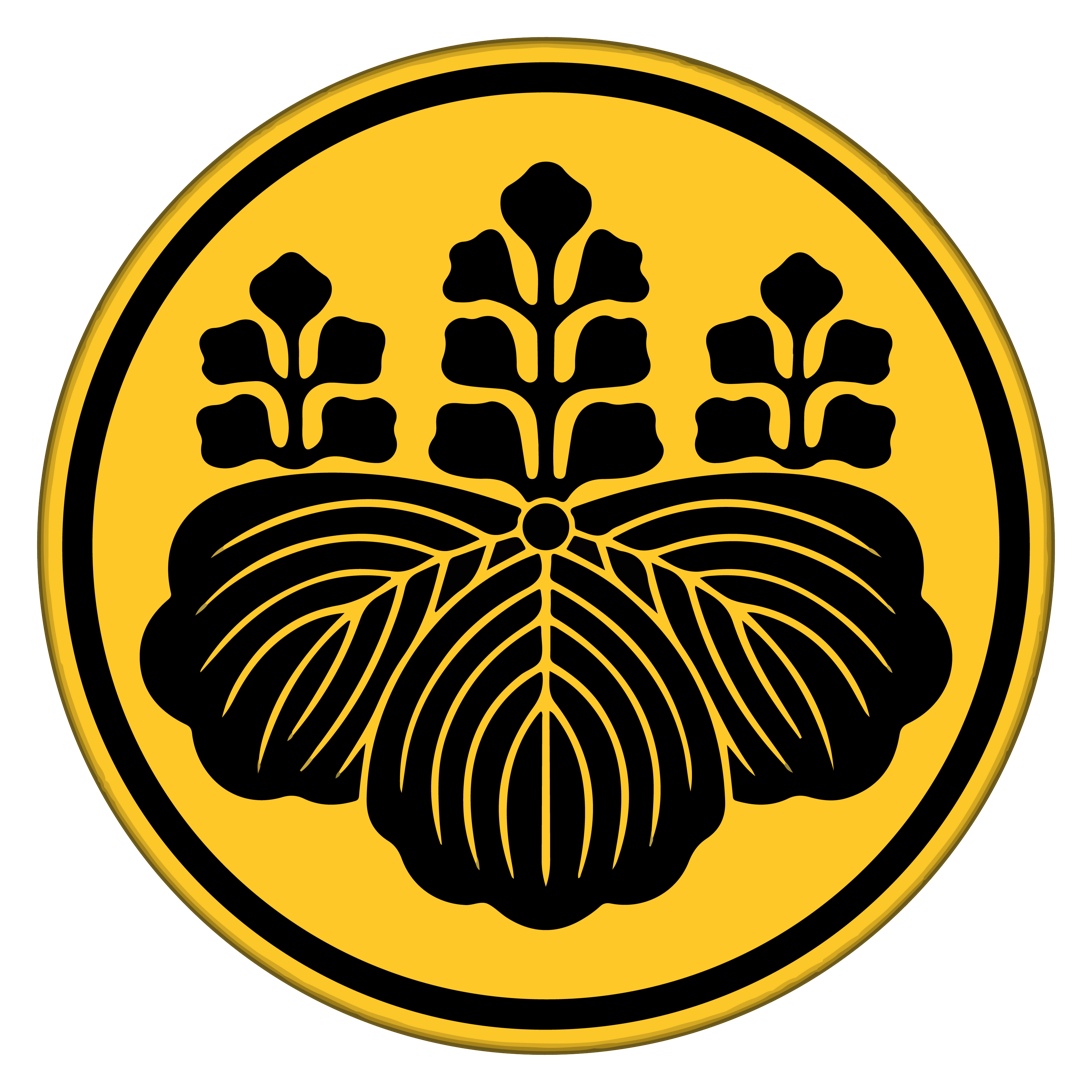
- Mon of the Oda Clan (1568–1582) Mon of the Toyotomi Clan (1585–1615)

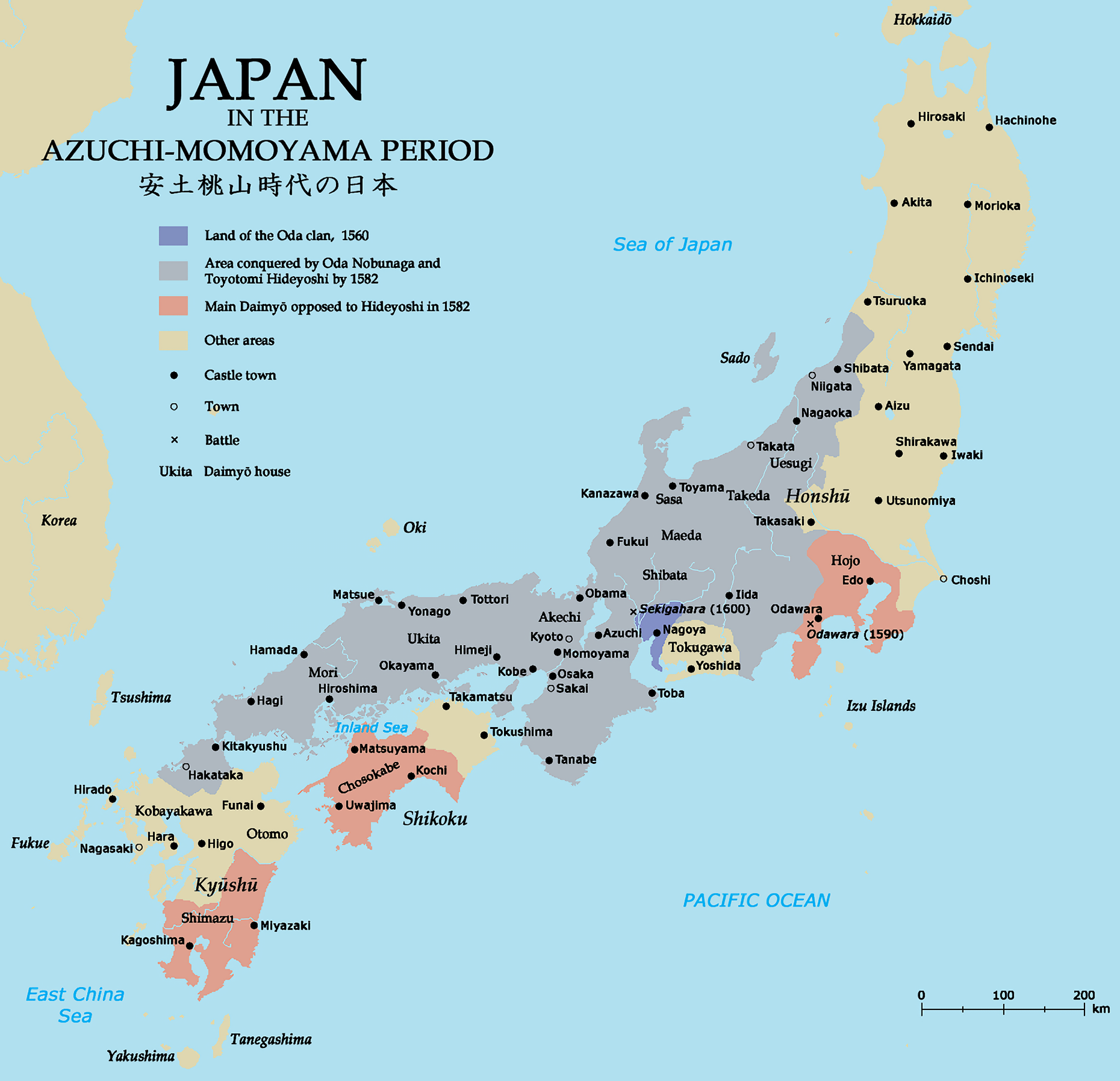
- Capital: Heian-kyō (Emperor's residence); Azuchi (Shogun's residence) (1573–1582); Heian-kyō (1582–1600)
- Largest city: Heian-kyō (1573–1596); Osaka (1596–1603)
- Common languages: Late Middle Japanese
- Government: Monarchy under a feudal confederal military dictatorship
- Emperor
  - 1573–1586: Ōgimachi
  - 1586–1603: Go-Yōzei
- Head of government
  - 1573–1582: Oda Nobunaga
  - 1582–1582: Akechi Mitsuhide
  - 1583–1598: Toyotomi Hideyoshi
  - 1598–1600: Council of Five Elders (Note: Members were Maeda Toshiie, Mōri Terumoto, Ukita Hideie, Uesugi Kagekatsu and Tokugawa Ieyasu (Head).)
  - 1600–1603: Tokugawa Ieyasu
- Legislature: None (1573–1598); Council of Five Elders (1598–1600); None (1600–1603)
- History
  - Oda Nobunaga captures Kyoto: October 18, 1573
  - Ashikaga shogunate abolished: September 2, 1573
  - Death of Oda Nobunaga: June 21, 1582
  - Battle of Yamazaki: July 2, 1582
  - Death of Toyotomi Hideyoshi: September 18, 1598
  - Council of Five Elders: 1598
  - Battle of Sekigahara: 21 October 1600
  - Tokugawa shogunate established: 24 March 1603
- Currency: Mon
Preceded by	Succeeded by
Ashikaga shogunate	Tokugawa shogunate
- 1. Emperor's residence and de jure capital of Japan.; 2. Oda Nobunaga's residence and de facto capital of Japan.

The Azuchi–Momoyama period (安土桃山時代, Azuchi–Momoyama jidai (Note: Japanese pronunciation: [aꜜ.(d)zɯ.tɕi | mo.mo.ja.ma (d)ʑiꜜ.dai, a.(d)zɯ.tɕi (|) mo.mo.ja.ma (d)ʑiꜜ-])) or Oda-Toyotomi period (織田・豊臣時代) or also Shokuhō period (織豊時代) was the final phase of the Sengoku period (戦国時代, Sengoku jidai) in Japanese history from 1568 to 1603.

After the outbreak of the Ōnin War in 1467, the power of the Ashikaga Shogunate effectively collapsed, marking the start of the chaotic Sengoku period. In 1568, Oda Nobunaga entered Kyoto to install Ashikaga Yoshiaki as the 15th and ultimately final Ashikaga shōgun. This entrance marked the start of the Azuchi-Momoyama period.

Nobunaga overthrew Yoshiaki and dissolved the Ashikaga Shogunate in 1573, launching a war of conquest to politically unify Japan by force from his base in Azuchi. Nobunaga was forced to commit suicide in the Honnō-ji Incident in 1582. His successor Toyotomi Hideyoshi completed Nobunaga's campaign of unification and enacted reforms to consolidate his rule, marking the end of the Sengoku period. Hideyoshi launched the Japanese invasions of Korea in 1592, but their failure damaged his prestige, and his young son and successor Toyotomi Hideyori was challenged by Tokugawa Ieyasu after Hideyoshi's death in 1598.

The Azuchi–Momoyama period ended with the Tokugawa victory at the Battle of Sekigahara in 1600 – unofficially establishing the Tokugawa Shogunate and beginning the Edo period. The Azuchi–Momoyama period encompassed the transition of Japanese society from the pre-modern to the early modern period. The Azuchi–Momoyama period is named after Nobunaga's Azuchi Castle and Hideyoshi's Momoyama Castle, and is also known as the Shokuhō period (織豊時代, Shokuhō jidai) in some Japanese texts, abridged from the surnames of the period's two leaders in on-yomi: Shoku (織) for Oda (織田) plus Hō (豊) for Toyotomi (豊臣).

== Oda Nobunaga begins unification ==
During the last half of the 16th century, a number of daimyōs became strong enough either to manipulate the Ashikaga shogunate to their own advantage or to overthrow it altogether. One attempt to overthrow the bakufu (the Japanese term for the shogunate) was made in 1560 by Imagawa Yoshimoto, whose march towards the capital came to an ignominious end at the hands of Oda Nobunaga in the Battle of Okehazama. In 1562, the Tokugawa clan who was adjacent to the east of Nobunaga's territory became independent of the Imagawa clan, and allied with Nobunaga. The eastern territory of Nobunaga was not invaded by this alliance. He then moved his army west. In 1565, an alliance of the Matsunaga and Miyoshi clans attempted a coup by assassinating Ashikaga Yoshiteru, the 13th Ashikaga shōgun. Internal squabbling, however, prevented them from acting swiftly to legitimatize their claim to power, and it was not until 1568 that they managed to install Yoshiteru's cousin, Ashikaga Yoshihide, as the next shōgun. Failure to enter Kyoto and gain recognition from the imperial court, however, had left the succession in doubt, and a group of bakufu retainers led by Hosokawa Fujitaka negotiated with Nobunaga to gain support for Yoshiteru's younger brother, Yoshiaki.

Nobunaga, who had prepared over a period of years for just such an opportunity by establishing an alliance with the Azai clan in northern Ōmi Province and then conquering the neighboring Mino Province, now marched toward Kyoto. After routing the Rokkaku clan in southern Ōmi, Nobunaga forced the Matsunaga to capitulate and the Miyoshi to withdraw to Settsu. He then entered the capital, where he successfully gained recognition from the emperor for Yoshiaki, who became the 15th and last Ashikaga shōgun.

Nobunaga had no intention, however, of serving the Muromachi bakufu, and instead now turned his attention to tightening his grip on the Kinai region. Resistance in the form of rival daimyōs, intransigent Buddhist monks, and hostile merchants was eliminated swiftly and mercilessly, and Nobunaga quickly gained a reputation as a ruthless, unrelenting adversary. In support of his political and military moves, he instituted economic reform, removing barriers to commerce by invalidating traditional monopolies held by shrines and guilds and promoting initiative by instituting free markets known as rakuichi-rakuza.

The newly installed shōgun Ashikaga Yoshiaki also was extremely wary of his powerful nominal retainer Nobunaga, and immediately began plotting against him by forming a wide alliance of nearly every daimyō adjacent to the Oda realm. This included Oda's close ally and brother in-law Azai Nagamasa, the supremely powerful Takeda Shingen, as well as the monk warriors from the Tendai Buddhists monastic center at Mount Hiei near Kyoto (who became the first major casualty of this war as it was completely destroyed by Nobunaga).

As the Oda army was bogged down by fighting on every corner, Takeda Shingen led what was by then widely considered as the most powerful army in Japan and marched towards the Oda home base of Owari, easily crushing Nobunaga's young ally and future shōgun Tokugawa Ieyasu in the Battle of Mikatagahara in 1573.

However, as the Takeda army was on the cusp of obliterating the Oda–Tokugawa alliance, Takeda Shingen suddenly perished, under mysterious circumstances. (Multiple suggestions for his demise include battlefield death from marksman, ninja assassination, and stomach cancer.) Having suddenly lost their leader, the Takeda army quickly retreated back to their home base in Kai Province.

With the death of Takeda Shingen in early 1573, the "Anti-Oda Alliance" that Ashikaga Yoshiaki created quickly crumbled as Nobunaga destroyed the alliance of the Asakura clan and Azai clan that threatened his northern flank, and soon after expelled the shōgun himself from Kyoto.

Even after Shingen's death, there remained several daimyōs powerful enough to resist Nobunaga, but none were situated close enough to Kyoto to pose a threat politically, and it appeared that unification under the Oda banner was a matter of time.

Nobunaga's enemies were not only other daimyōs but also adherents of a Jōdo Shinshū sect of Buddhism who were of the Ikkō-ikki faction, led by Kōsa. He endured though Nobunaga kept attacking his fortress for ten years. Nobunaga expelled Kennyo in the eleventh year, but, through a riot caused by Kennyo, Nobunaga's territory took the bulk of the damage. This long war was called the Ishiyama Hongan-ji War.

Nobunaga was highly interested in foreign cultures, especially those of western Europe. A significant amount of Western Christian culture was introduced to Japan by missionaries from Europe. From this exposure, Japan received new foods, a new drawing method, astronomy, geography, medical science, and new printing techniques. Most critically, trade with Europe provided Nobunaga's armies with new weapons, among them the matchlock rifle or arquebus.

Nobunaga decided to reduce the power of the Buddhist monasteries, and gave protection to Christianity, although he never converted to Christianity himself. He slaughtered many Buddhist priests who resisted him, and burned their fortified temples.

The activities of European traders and Catholic missionaries (Alessandro Valignano, Luís Fróis, Gnecchi-Soldo Organtino) in Japan saw one of the earliest relatively numerous increase of Europeans into the region.

During the period from 1576 to 1579, Nobunaga constructed, on the shore of Lake Biwa at Azuchi, Azuchi Castle, a magnificent seven-story castle that was intended to serve not simply as an impregnable military fortification, but also as a sumptuous residence that would stand as a symbol of unification.

Having secured his grip on the Kinai region, Nobunaga was now powerful enough to assign his generals the task of subjugating the outlying provinces. Shibata Katsuie was given the task of conquering the Uesugi clan in Etchū, Takigawa Kazumasu confronted the Shinano Province that a son of Shingen, Takeda Katsuyori governed, and Hashiba Hideyoshi was given the formidable task of facing the Mōri clan in the Chūgoku region of western Honshū.

In 1575, Nobunaga won a significant victory over the Takeda clan in the Battle of Nagashino. Despite the strong reputation of Takeda's samurai cavalry, Oda Nobunaga embraced the relatively new technology of the arquebus, and inflicted a crushing defeat. The legacy of this battle forced a complete overhaul of traditional Japanese warfare.

In 1582, after a protracted campaign, Hideyoshi requested Nobunaga's help in overcoming the resistance of the Mōri clan. Nobunaga, making a stop-over in Kyoto on his way west with only a small contingent of guards, was attacked by one of his own disaffected generals, Akechi Mitsuhide, and committed suicide.

== Hideyoshi completes the unification ==
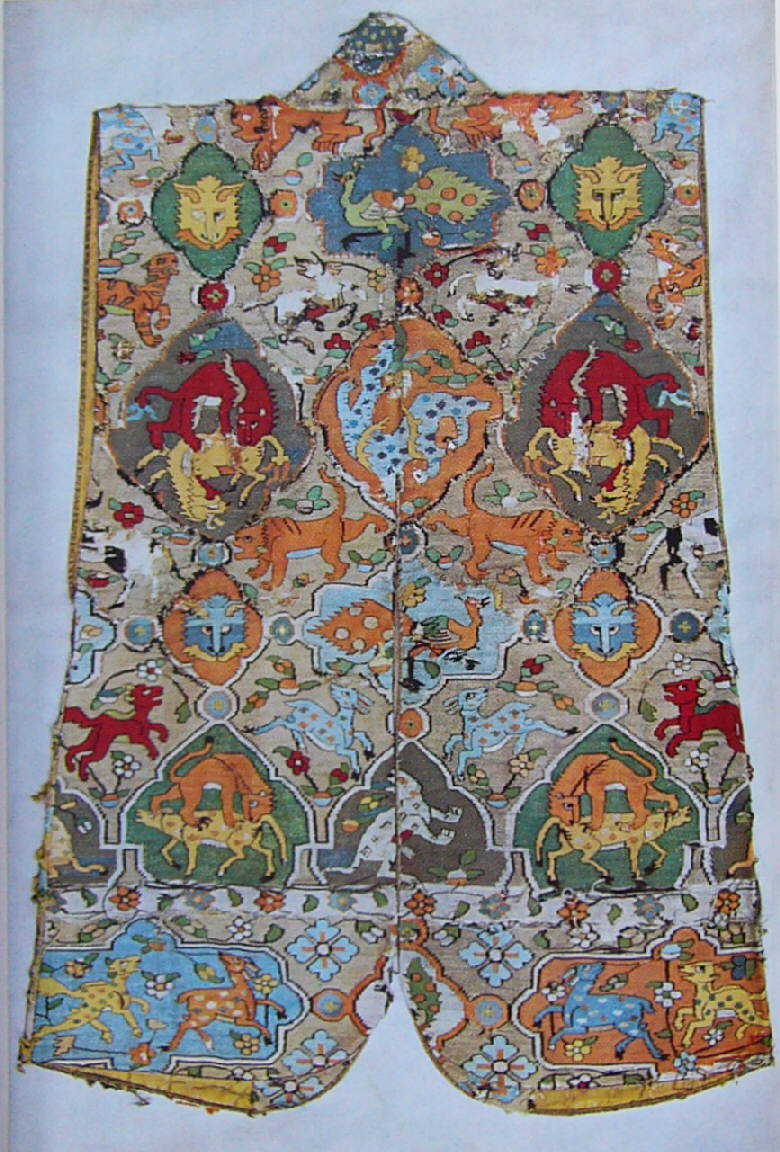
Toyotomi Hideyoshi's battlefield vest

What followed was a scramble by the most powerful of Nobunaga's retainers to avenge their lord's death and thereby establish a dominant position in negotiations over the forthcoming realignment of the Oda clan. The situation became even more urgent when it was made known that Nobunaga's oldest son and heir, Nobutada, killed himself, leaving the Oda clan with no clear successor.

Quickly negotiating a truce with the Mōri clan before they could learn of Nobunaga's death, Hideyoshi now took his troops on a forced march toward his adversary, whom he defeated at the Battle of Yamazaki less than two weeks later.

Although a commoner who had risen through the ranks from foot soldier, Hideyoshi was now in a position to challenge even the most senior of the Oda clan's hereditary retainers, and proposed that Nobutada's infant son, Sanpōshi (who became Oda Hidenobu), be named heir rather than Nobunaga's adult third son, Nobutaka, whose cause had been championed by Shibata Katsuie. Having gained the support of other senior retainers, including Niwa Nagahide and Ikeda Tsuneoki, Sanpōshi was named heir and Hideyoshi appointed co-guardian.

Continued political intrigue, however, eventually led to open confrontation. After defeating Shibata at the Battle of Shizugatake in 1583 and enduring a costly but ultimately advantageous stalemate with Tokugawa Ieyasu at the Battle of Komaki and Nagakute in 1584, Hideyoshi managed to settle the question of succession for once and all, to take complete control of Kyoto, and to become the undisputed ruler of the former Oda domains. The daimyō of the Shikoku Chōsokabe clan surrendered to Hideyoshi in July, 1585, and the daimyō of Kyushu Shimazu clan also surrendered two years later. He was adopted by the Fujiwara clan, given the surname Toyotomi, and granted the superlative title kanpaku, representing civil and military control of all Japan. By the following year, he had secured alliances with three of the nine major daimyō coalitions and carried the war of unification to Shikoku and Kyushu. In 1590, at the head of an army of 200,000, Hideyoshi defeated the Later Hōjō clan, his last formidable rival in eastern Honshū in the siege of Odawara. The remaining daimyō soon capitulated, and the military reunification of Japan was complete.

== Japan under Hideyoshi ==
=== Land survey ===
With all of Japan now under Hideyoshi's control, a new structure for national government was set up. The country was unified under a single leader, but daily governance remained decentralized. The basis of power was distribution of territory as measured by rice production, in units of koku. A national survey from 1598 was instituted, with assessments showing the national rice production at 18.5 million koku, 2 million of which was controlled directly by Hideyoshi himself. In contrast, Tokugawa Ieyasu, whom Hideyoshi had transferred to the Kanto region, held 2.5 million koku. The surveys, carried out by Hideyoshi both before and after he took the title of taikō, have come to be known as the "Taikō surveys" (Taikō kenchi). (Note: The surveys are called Taikō kenchi despite Hideyoshi not yet being officially taikō at the beginning of the surveys, although he referred to himself as such. Hideyoshi officially became taikō in 1591 after he relinquished the title of kanpaku to his nephew, Hidetsugu.))

=== Control measures ===
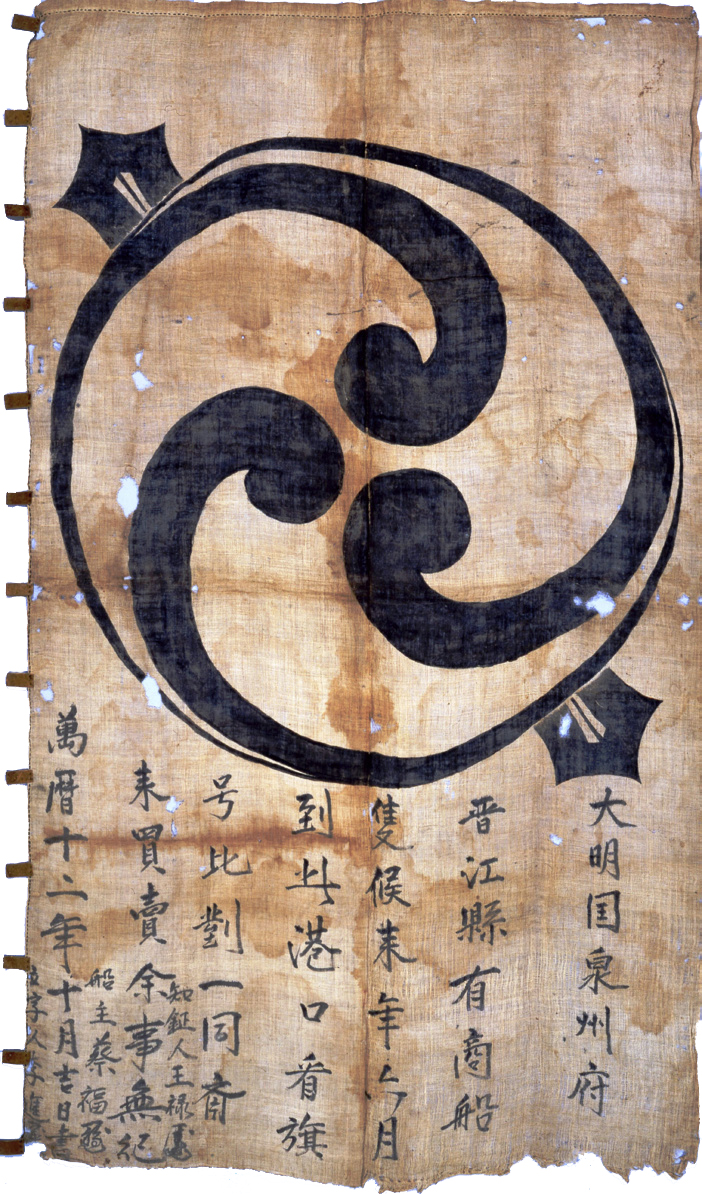
1584 Japan-Ming trade ship flag, inscribed with the signatures and kaō, or stylized signatures, of three Ming merchants; to be raised the following year upon arrival in what is now Shimonoseki (Yamaguchi Prefectural Archives)

A number of other administrative innovations were instituted to encourage commerce and stabilize society. In order to facilitate transportation, toll booths and other checkpoints along roads were largely eliminated, as were unnecessary military strongholds. Measures that effectively froze class distinctions were instituted, including the requirement that different classes live separately in different areas of a town and a prohibition on the carrying or ownership of weapons by farmers. Hideyoshi ordered the collection of weapons in a great "sword hunt" (katanagari).

==== Prosecution of Christians ====
In 1586, Hideyoshi conquered Kyushu in the Kyushu Campaign (1586-1587) from the Shimazu clan. In 1587, Hideyoshi increased control over the Kirishitan daimyos by banishing Christian missionaries from Kyūshū. In January 1597, Hideyoshi ordered the arrest of twenty-six Christians to warn Japanese who thought about converting to Christianity. They were tortured, mutilated, paraded through towns and crucified in Nagasaki. This became known as the 26 Martyrs of Japan. These measures severely curbed Christianity and foreign influence in Japan.

=== Unification ===
Hideyoshi sought to secure his position by rearranging the holdings of the daimyōs to his advantage. In particular, he reassigned the Tokugawa family to the Kanto region, far from the capital, and surrounded their new territory with more trusted vassals. He also adopted a hostage system, in which the wives and heirs of daimyōs resided at his castle town in Osaka.

Hideyoshi attempted to provide for an orderly succession by taking the title taikō, or "retired Kanpaku (Imperial regent)", in 1591, and turned the regency over to his nephew and adopted son Toyotomi Hidetsugu. Only later did he attempt to formalize the balance of power by establishing administrative bodies. These included the Council of Five Elders, who were sworn to keep peace and support the Toyotomi, the five-member Board of House Administrators, who handled routine policy and administrative matters, and the three-member Board of Mediators, who were charged with keeping peace between the first two boards.

=== Korean campaigns ===
Hideyoshi's last major ambition was to conquer the Ming dynasty of China. In April 1592, after having been refused safe passage through Korea, Hideyoshi sent an army of 200,000 to invade and pass through Korea by force. During the Japanese invasions of Korea (1592–1598), the Japanese occupied Seoul by May 1592, and within three months of the invasion, the Japanese reached Pyongyang. King Seonjo of Joseon fled, and two Korean princes were captured by Katō Kiyomasa. (Note: History of Ming: 昖棄王城, 令次子琿攝國事, 奔平壤.已, 複走義州, 願內屬.七月, 兵部議令駐劄險要, 以待天兵; 號召通國勤王, 以圖恢復.而是時倭已入王京, 毀墳墓, 劫王子、陪臣, 剽府庫, 八道幾盡沒, 旦暮且渡鴨綠江, 請援之使絡繹於道.) (Note: 北関大捷碑 "其秋清正 入北道、兵鋭甚、鐡嶺以北無城守焉、於是鞠敬仁等叛、應賊、敬仁者會寧府吏也、素志不卒、及賊到富寧、隙危扇亂、執兩王子及宰臣、□播者、並傳諸長吏、與賊效欸") Seonjo dispatched an emissary to the Ming court, asking urgently for military assistance. The Chinese emperor sent admiral Chen Lin and commander Li Rusong to aid the Koreans. Commander Li pushed the Japanese out of the northern part of the Korean Peninsula. The Japanese were forced to withdraw as far as the southern part of the Korean peninsula by January 1593, and counterattacked Li Rusong. This combat reached a stalemate, and Japan and China eventually entered peace talks. (Note: History of Ming: 明年, 如松 (Li Rusong)師大捷於平壤, 朝鮮所失四道並複.如松乘勝趨碧蹄館, 敗而退師.)

During the peace talks that ensued between 1593 and 1597, Hideyoshi, seeing Japan as an equal of Ming China, demanded a division of Korea, free-trade status, and a Chinese princess as consort for the emperor. The Joseon and Chinese leaders saw no reason to concede to such demands, nor to treat the invaders as equals within the Ming trading system. Japan's requests were thus denied and peace efforts reached an impasse.

A second invasion of Korea began in 1597, but it too resulted in failure as Japanese forces met with better organized Korean defenses especially under Admiral Yi Sun-sin of the Korean navy and an increasing Chinese involvement in the conflict. Upon the death of Hideyoshi in 1598, his designated successor Toyotomi Hideyori was only 5 years old. As such, the domestic political situation in Japan became unstable, making continuation of the war difficult and causing the Japanese to withdraw from Korea. At this stage, most of the remaining Japanese commanders were more concerned about internal battles and the inevitable struggles for the control of the shogunate.

== Establishment of the Tokugawa shogunate in 1603 ==
Hideyoshi had on his deathbed appointed a group of the most powerful lords in Japan—Tokugawa, Maeda, Ukita, Uesugi, and Mōri, to govern as the Council of Five Elders until his infant son, Hideyori, came of age. An uneasy peace lasted until the death of Maeda Toshiie in 1599. Thereafter, Ishida Mitsunari accused Ieyasu of disloyalty to the Toyotomi name, precipitating a crisis that led to the Battle of Sekigahara. Generally regarded as the last major conflict of both the Azuchi–Momoyama and the Sengoku period, Ieyasu's victory at Sekigahara marked the end of Toyotomi's reign. Three years later, Ieyasu received the title Sei-i Tai-shōgun, and established the Edo bakufu, which lasted until the Meiji Restoration in 1868.

== Social and commercial developments ==
The period saw the development of large urban centers and the rise of the merchant class. The ornate castle architecture and interiors adorned with painted screens embellished with gold leaf were a reflection of a daimyō's power but also exhibited a new aesthetic sense that marked a clear departure from the somber monotones favored during the Muromachi period. A genre that emerged at this time was called the Nanban style—exotic depictions of European priests, traders, and other "southern barbarians".

The art of the tea ceremony also flourished at this time, and both Nobunaga and Hideyoshi lavished time and money on this pastime, collecting tea bowls, caddies, and other implements, sponsoring lavish social events, and patronizing acclaimed masters such as Sen no Rikyū.

Hideyoshi had occupied Nagasaki in 1587, and thereafter sought to take control of international trade and to regulate the trade associations that had contact with the outside world through this port. Although China rebuffed his efforts to secure trade concessions, Hideyoshi's commercial missions successfully called upon present-day Malaysia, the Philippines, and Thailand in red seal ships. He was also suspicious of Christianity in Japan, which he saw as potentially subversive, and some missionaries were crucified by his regime.

Even in warfare, It is recorded that Japanese warlords during the Sengoku period assigned high priority to the matter of hygiene management in castles and camps. In June 1581, the Hōjō clan issued a written code of conduct to the soldiers guarding Hamaiba Castle in Sagami Province (located in Minamiashigara City, Kanagawa Prefecture), ordering them to remove all human and horse excrement from the castle on a daily basis. They also issued strict rules that manure could not be disposed of within a distance of about 100 meters from the castle. In 1582, the Hōjō clan issued a new order to soldiers on duty guarding Ashigara Castle to ensure proper disposal of excrement and urine. The Takeda clan also strictly prohibited defecation or urination near their camps. During the Siege of Osaka, Tokugawa leader Yoshihide Koide ordered that the installation of toilets be prioritized, and Ii Naotaka is said to have imposed a fine of 10 sen on anyone who used the toilet near the camp.

== Chronology ==
- 1568: Nobunaga enters Kyoto, marking the beginning of the Azuchi–Momoyama period and installing Ashikaga Yoshiaki as the 15th shogun.
- 1573: Ashikaga Yoshiaki begins a Revolt against Oda, Oda overthrows Yoshiaki, exiles him and exerts control over central Japan.
- 1575: Nobunaga defeats the Takeda clan the Battle of Nagashino
- 1580: The Ikkō-ikki finally surrender their fortress of Ishiyama Hongan-ji to Nobunaga, after enduring an 11-year siege.
- 1582:
  - Incident at Honnō-ji, Nobunaga is assassinated by Akechi Mitsuhide, who is then defeated by Toyotomi Hideyoshi at the Battle of Yamazaki.
  - Hideyoshi initiated the Taikō kenchi surveys.
  - Tenshō embassy is sent by the Japanese Christian lord Ōtomo Sōrin.
- 1584: Hideyoshi fights Tokugawa Ieyasu to a standstill at the Battle of Komaki and Nagakute.
- 1586: Osaka Castle is built by Toyotomi Hideyoshi.
- 1588: Hideyoshi issues the order of Sword hunt (刀狩, katanagari).
- 1590: Hideyoshi defeats the Hōjō clan, effectively unifying Japan.
- 1591: Sen no Rikyū is forced to commit suicide by Hideyoshi.
- 1592: Hideyoshi initiates the first invasion of Korea.
- 1593: Toyotomi Hideyori is born.
- 1595: Hideyoshi orders his nephew and reigning kampaku, Toyotomi Hidetsugu, to commit seppuku.
- 1597:
  - Second invasion of Korea
  - Execution of the 26 Martyrs of Japan.
- 1598: Hideyoshi dies.
- 1599: Maeda Toshiie dies.
- 1600: Ieyasu is victorious at the Battle of Sekigahara
- 1603: Tokugawa Shogunate established, marking the end of the Azuchi–Momoyama period.

== See also ==
- Golden Tea Room
- Azuchi Screens

== Notes ==
=== Citations ===
Preceded by Sengoku period 1467–1573	History of Japan; Azuchi–Momoyama period 1573–1603	Succeeded by Edo period 1603–1868
Preceded by Muromachi period 1336–1573	History of Japan; Azuchi–Momoyama period 1573–1603	Succeeded by Edo period 1603–1868
