= 義明 =

義明 or 义明, meaning "justice, bright", is an Asian given name.

It may refer to:

- Kwan Yoke Meng (关义明; born 1966), former badminton player from Malaysia
- Richard Eu (余义明; pinyin: Yú Yìmíng; born 1947), Singaporean businessperson and musician
- Yan Yiming (闫义明; born 1998), Chinese footballer
- Yoshiaki, Japanese masculine given name
