= Iimoriyama Castle =

Castle ruins in Osaka, Japan

- 飯盛山城
- Shijōnawate, Osaka, Osaka Prefecture, Japan

Site information
- Type: mountaintop-style castle
- Owner: Miyoshi clan
- Condition: ruins

Location
- Coordinates: 34.726408°N 135.653667°E

Site history
- Built: 1333-38
- Built by: Kizawa Nagamasa
- Materials: Stone walls
- Demolished: 1576
- Battles/wars: Battle of Iimoriyama Castle(1532)

Garrison information
- Past commanders: Kizawa Nagamasa, Miyoshi Nagayoshi

Iimoriyama Castle (飯盛山城, Iimoriyama-jō) was a Sengoku period mountain-top castle in Osaka Prefecture, Japan. Located on a 315.9 meter mountain. It was the original base of power for the Miyoshi clan.

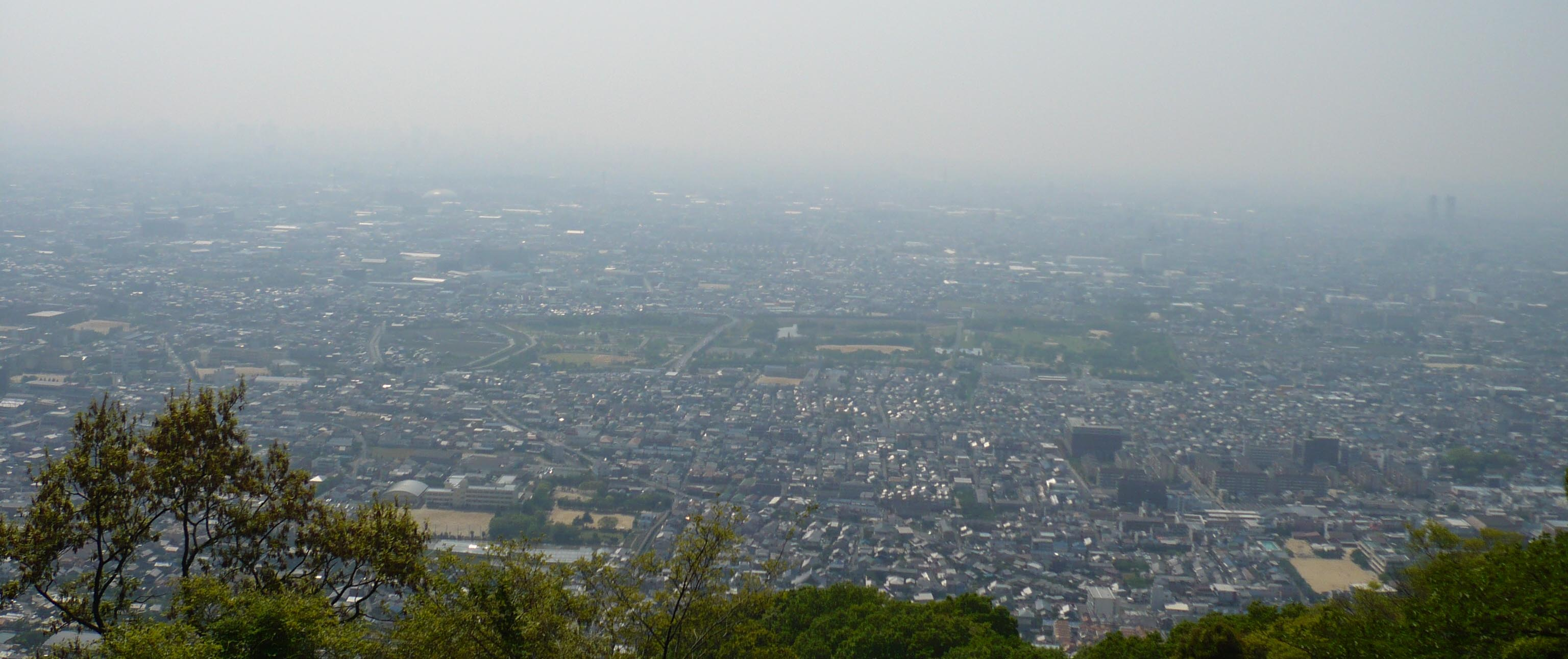
View from Honkuruwa base

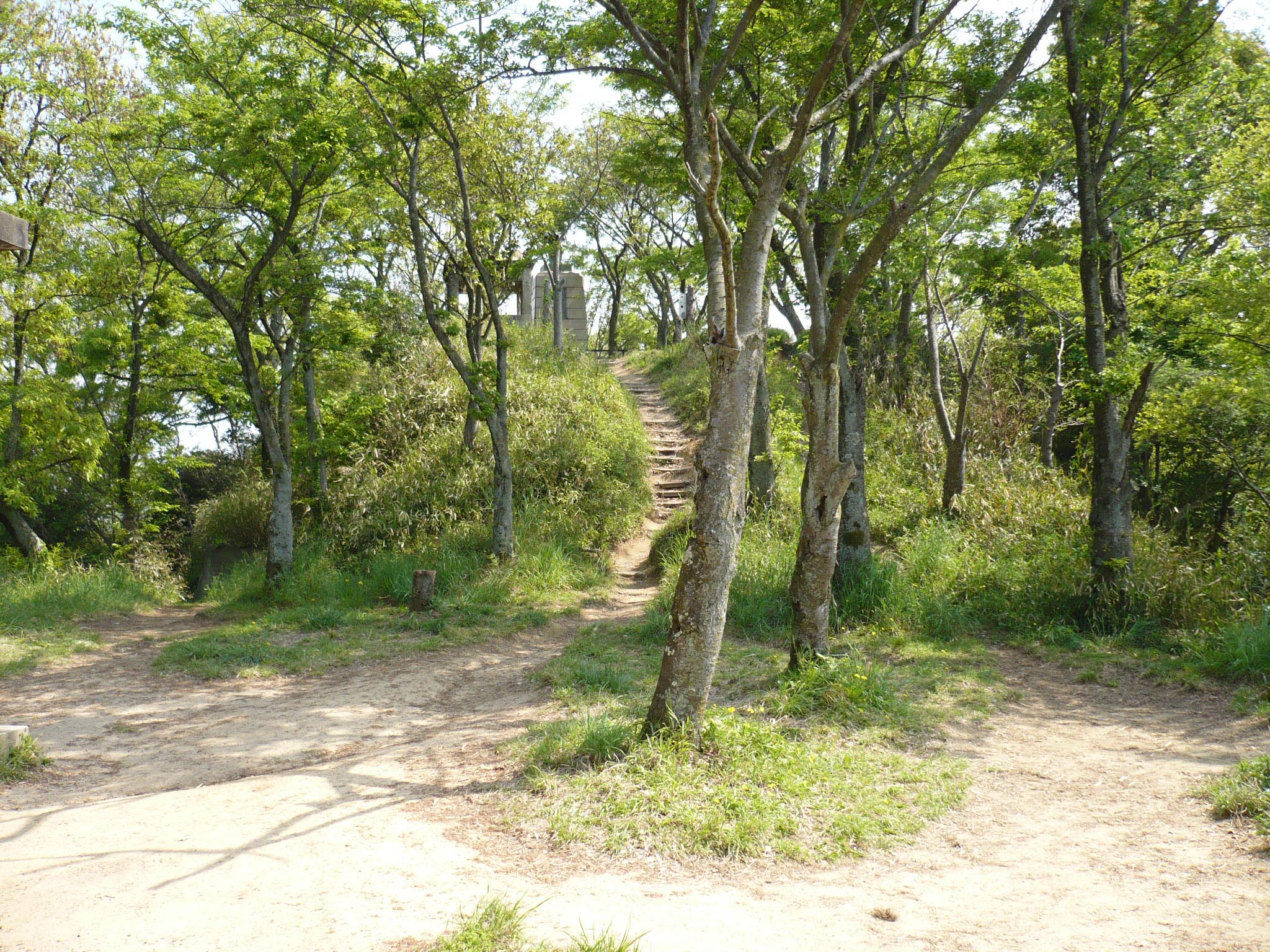
Honkuruwa base

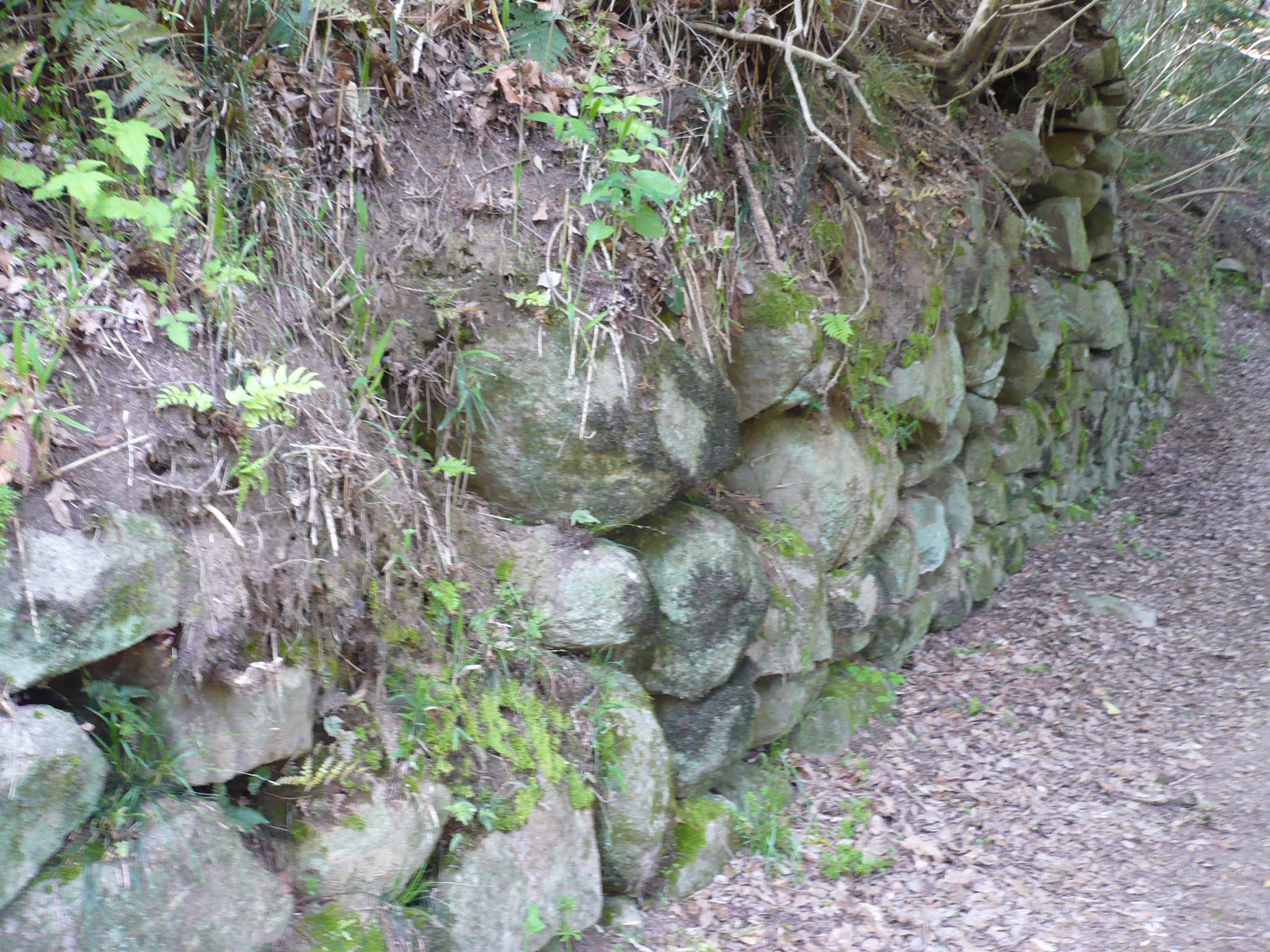
Stone wall of Honkuruwa base

== History ==
Iimoriyama Castle was built by Kizawa Nagamasa and was later controlled by the Miyoshi clan.

Miyoshi Nagayoshi relocated his home castle from Akutagawayama Castle to Iimoriyama Castle in 1560.

In 1564, Miyoshi Nagayoshi died in the castle.

The castle was listed as one of the Continued Top 100 Japanese Castles in 2017.

== Preservation ==
The castle is now only ruins, with some stone walls, moats and Dobashi bridges.
