= Yoshiaki =

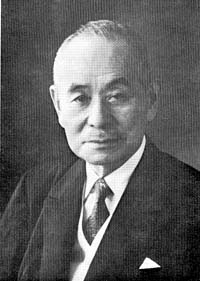
- Yoshiaki Hatta (1879–1964), Japanese engineer and politician
- Pronunciation: joɕiakʲi (IPA)
- Gender: Male

Origin
- Origin: Japanese
- Meaning: Different meanings depending on the kanji used

Other names
- Alternative spelling: Yosiaki (Kunrei-shiki) Yosiaki (Nihon-shiki) Yoshiaki (Hepburn)

Yoshiaki is a masculine Japanese given name.

== Written forms ==
Yoshiaki can be written using many different combinations of kanji characters. Here are some examples:

- 孔明, "even bright"
- 義明, "justice, bright"
- 義昭, "justice, bright"
- 義章, "justice, chapter"
- 吉明, "good luck, bright"
- 吉昭, "good luck, bright"
- 吉旭, "good luck, rising sun"
- 善明, "virtuous, bright"
- 善彰, "virtuous, clear"
- 芳明, "virtuous/fragrant, bright"
- 芳昭, "virtuous/fragrant, bright"
- 良明, "good, bright"
- 良晃, "good, clear"
- 慶昭, "congratulate, bright"
- 由晃, "reason, clear"
- 与志明, "give, determination, bright"
- 嘉明, "excellent, bright"
- 嘉秋, "excellent, autumn"

The name can also be written in hiragana よしあき or katakana ヨシアキ.

== Notable people with the name ==
- Yoshiaki Ashikaga (足利 義昭, 1537–1597), a shōgun of the Ashikaga shogunate in Japan
- Yoshiaki Arata (荒田 吉明, 1924–2018), a Japanese pioneer of nuclear fusion
- Yoshiaki Banno (番野 欣昭, 1952–1991), a Japanese astronomer
- Yoshiaki Demachi (出町 嘉明; born 1943), Japanese speed skater
- Yoshiaki Fujimori (藤森 義明, born 1951), a Japanese businessman and CEO of Lixil Group
- Yoshiaki Fujioka (藤岡 好明, born 1985), a Japanese baseball player
- Yoshiaki Fujita (藤田 義明, born 1983), a Japanese footballer
- Yoshiaki Fujiwara (藤原 喜明, born 1949), a Japanese actor and professional wrestler
- Yoshiaki Harada (原田 義昭, born 1944), a Japanese politician
- Yoshiaki Hatakeda (畠田 好章, born 1972), a Japanese gymnast
- Yoshiaki Hatta (八田 嘉明, 1879–1964), a cabinet minister in the Empire of Japan
- Yoshiaki Hoshi (星 吉昭, 1946–2004), a Japanese musician
- Yoshiaki Itakura (板倉 由明, 1932–1999), a Japanese researcher of military history
- Yoshiaki Kato (加藤 嘉明, 1563–1631), a Japanese daimyō
- Yoshiaki Kawajiri (川尻 善昭, born 1950) a Japanese writer and director of Japanese animation
- Yoshiaki Kawashima (川島 義明, born 1934), a Japanese long-distance runner
- Yoshiaki Kikuchi (菊池 禎晃; born 1995), Japanese footballer
- Yoshiaki Koizumi (小泉 歓晃, born 1968), a Japanese video game designer
- Yoshiaki Komai (駒井 善成, born 1992), a Japanese footballer
- Yoshiaki Kuruma (車 吉章, born 1961), a Japanese free announcer
- Yoshiaki Kyoya (京谷 佳明; born 1951), Japanese ice hockey player
- Yoshiaki Manabe (真鍋 吉明, born 1962), lead guitarist of the Japanese rock band The Pillows
- Yoshiaki Maruyama (丸山 良明, born 1974), a Japanese football player
- Yoshiaki Miyagi (宮城 孔明, born 1999), Japanese actor who cast in two television series—Jūichinin mo Iru! and Mischievous Kiss: Love in Tokyo
- Yoshiaki Miyanoue (宮之上 貴昭, born 1953), a Japanese jazz guitarist
- Yoshiaki Mogami (最上 義光, 1546–1614), a Japanese daimyō
- Yoshiaki Murakami (村上 世彰, born 1959), a Japanese investor
- Yoshiaki Nishimura (西村 義明, born 1977), a Japanese lead film producer
- Yoshiaki Nitta (新田 義顕, 1318–1337), a general at the fortress of Kanagasaki and son of Yoshisada Nitta
- Yoshiaki Numata (沼田 義明, born 1945), a world Junior Lightweight boxing champion
- Yoshiaki Ochi, (越智 義朗) a Japanese composer and percussionist
- Yoshiaki Ogasawara (小笠原 義明, born 1954), a Japanese cyclist
- Yoshiaki Oiwa (大岩 義明, born 1976), a Japanese equestrian
- Yoshiaki Omura (大村 喜前, 1568–1615) a head of the Omura clan
- Yoshiaki Onishi (大西 義明, born 1981), a Japanese composer and conductor
- Yoshiaki Oshima (大島 良明, born 1952), a Japanese astronomer
- Yoshiaki Ota (太田 吉彰, born 1983), a Japanese footballer
- Yoshiaki Sato (佐藤 慶明, born 1969), a Japanese football player
- Yoshiaki Shikishi (敷石 義秋, born 1941), a Japanese swimmer
- Yoshiaki Shimojo (下條 佳明, born 1954), a Japanese football player
- Yoshiaki Takahashi (高橋 良秋; born 1963), Japanese boxer
- Yoshiaki Takaki (高木 義明, born 1945), a Japanese politician
- Yoshiaki Tokitenku (時天空 慶晃, 1979–2017), a Mongolian sumo wrestler
- Yoshiaki Tsutsumi (堤 義明, born 1934), a Japanese businessman
- Yoshiaki Unetani (采谷 義秋, born 1944), a Japanese long-distance runner
- Yoshiaki Watanabe (渡辺 好明, 1955–2009), a Japanese artist
- Yoshiaki Yatsu (谷津 嘉章, born 1956), a Japanese wrestler
- Yoshiaki Yoshimi (吉見 義明, born 1946), a professor of Japanese modern history

== See also ==
- 10405 Yoshiaki, an asteroid named after Yoshiaki Mogami
- Mogami Yoshiaki Historical Museum, located in the city of Yamagata
- 孔明 (disambiguation)
- 義明 (disambiguation)
