= 孔明 =

孔明, meaning "even bright", may refer to:

- Gong Myung (born 1994), South Korean actor
- Kong Ming (Water Margin), a fictional character in the Water Margin
- Koumei Oda (born 1978), Japanese professional golfer
- Yoshiaki Miyagi (born 1999; 宮城 孔明), Japanese actor who cast in two television series——Jūichinin mo Iru! and Mischievous Kiss: Love in Tokyo
- Zhuge Liang, a Three Kingdoms strategist whose Chinese style name is Kongming

== See also ==
- Kong Ming
- Sky lantern, also known as Kǒngmíng lantern (traditional Chinese: 孔明燈; simplified Chinese: 孔明灯), small hot air balloon made of paper
- Yoshiaki
