= Shigisan Castle =

Coordinates: 34°36′46″N 135°40′06″E

Shigisan castle
- 信貴山城
- Mount Shigi, border of Yamato and Kawachi Provinces, Japan
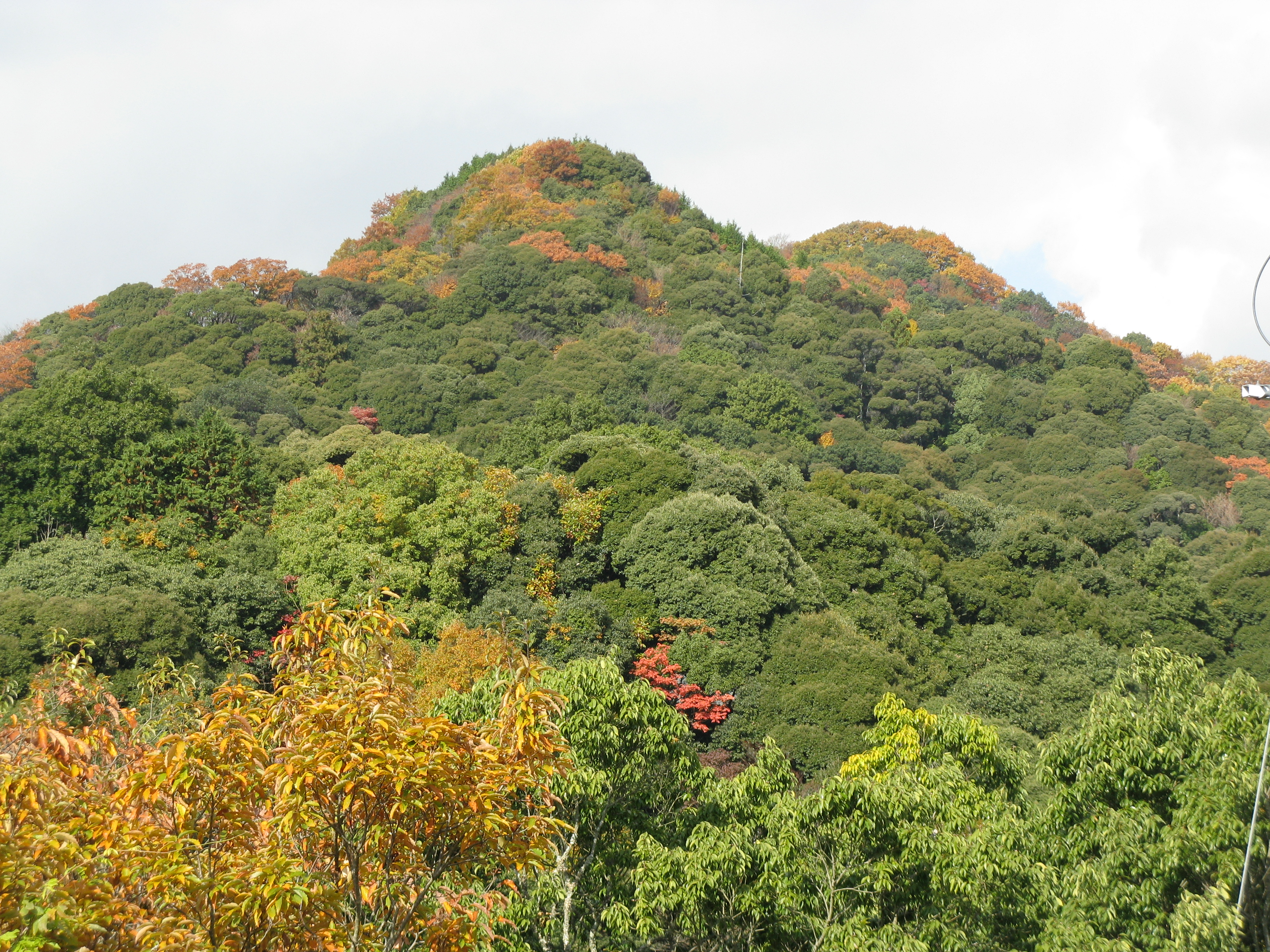
- Mt Shigi (Shigisan Castle)

Site information
- Type: yamashiro-type Japanese castle

Location

Site history
- Built: 1536
- Built by: Kizawa Nagamasa
- In use: 1536–1577
- Demolished: 1577
- Battles/wars: Siege of Shigisan (1577)

Garrison information
- Past commanders: Kizawa Nagamasa, Matsunaga Danjo Hisahide

Shigisan castle (信貴山城, Shigisanjō) was a Japanese castle of the Sengoku period, controlled by the Kizawa and Matsunaga clans. There are little remains of the castle on the present day site, just some moats and earthworks.

== Location ==
The castle was located atop Mount Shigi, on the border of Japan's Kawachi and Yamato Provinces (today Nara prefecture). The shugo (shogunal governors) and later daimyō of Yamato province ruled the province from Shigisan, and wielded some control over the strategic passes between Yamato and Kawachi.

The location was also significant for the temple of Chōgosonshi-ji, which sits on the mountainside, some distance below the castle. Shigisan is the central mountain of the Shingon sect of Buddhism, and is claimed to be the location where, in 587, Shōtoku Taishi defeated Mononobe no Moriya in the battle of Shigisan.

== History ==
The castle was originally constructed in 1536 by Kizawa Nagamasa, who commanded it on behalf of the Hatakeyama clan, who held the post of shugo of Yamato province. It was repaired and expanded on in 1559, by Matsunaga Danjo Hisahide, who commanded it on behalf of the Miyoshi clan. It would grow to be roughly 700m from north to south, and 550m from east to west, and included a four-story yagura (tower or turret). In 1562, however, the daimyo of Yamato province moved to Tamonyama Castle.

Shigisan castle fell to members of the Miyoshi clan in 1568, but was recaptured quickly afterwards when the attackers' attention was redirected to the capital by the activities of Oda Nobunaga.

Nobunaga would then besiege the castle in 1577, destroying it and bringing the downfall of Matsunaga Hisahide.

== See also ==
- Shigisan-engi
- List of Historic Sites of Japan (Nara)
