= Kong Ming =

Kong Ming or Kongming may refer to:

- Zhuge Liang, Three Kingdoms strategist whose Chinese style name is Kongming
- Wu Kongming, Chinese politician
- Kong Ming (Water Margin), a fictional character in the Water Margin

== See also ==
- 孔明 (disambiguation)
