= Ashikaga Yoshiaki =

Japanese Samurai, Daimyo and Military ruler of Japan from 1568 to 1573

- 足利 義昭
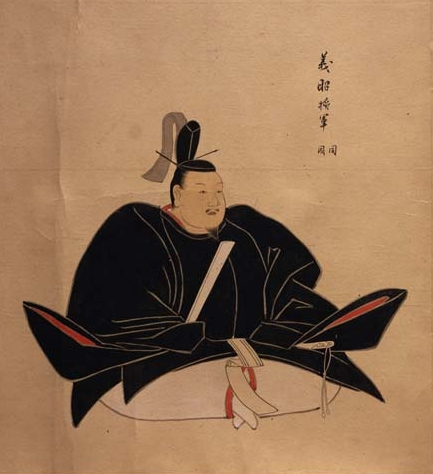

Shōgun
- In office 1568–1573
- Monarch: Ōgimachi
- Preceded by: Ashikaga Yoshihide
- Succeeded by: Tokugawa Ieyasu (as head of the Tokugawa Shogunate)

Personal details
- Born: 5 December 1537 Ashikaga shogunate
- Died: 19 October 1597 (aged 59) Azuchi–Momoyama period
- Parents: Ashikaga Yoshiharu (father); Keiju-in, daughter of Konoe Hisamichi (mother)
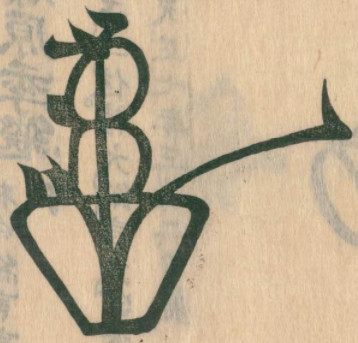
- Signature

Ashikaga Yoshiaki (足利 義昭; 5 December 1537 – 19 October 1597) was a Japanese samurai, daimyo and the 15th and final shōgun of the Ashikaga shogunate in Japan who reigned from 1568 to 1573 when he staged a revolt and was overthrown. His father, Ashikaga Yoshiharu, was the twelfth shōgun, and his brother, Ashikaga Yoshiteru, was the thirteenth shōgun.

== Biography ==
Ashikaga Yoshiaki was born to Ashikaga Yoshiharu on 5 December 1537. He entered Kofuku-ji temple as a monk, but when his older brother Yoshiteru was killed by the Miyoshi clan, he returned to secular life and took the name "Yoshiaki". At the time, the Ashikaga shogunate had been severely weakened; its authority was largely ignored across Japan. Regardless, various factions still fought to control the central government, as it still held some prestige despite its diminished status. Ashikaga Yoshiteru attempted to overthrow the Miyoshi who effectively controlled him, but his conspiracies led the Miyoshi and Matsunaga Hisahide to organize a coup d'état as well as force Yoshiteru to commit suicide. They then opted to install Ashikaga Yoshihide as the fourteenth shogun in Kyoto, but were unable to control the capital.

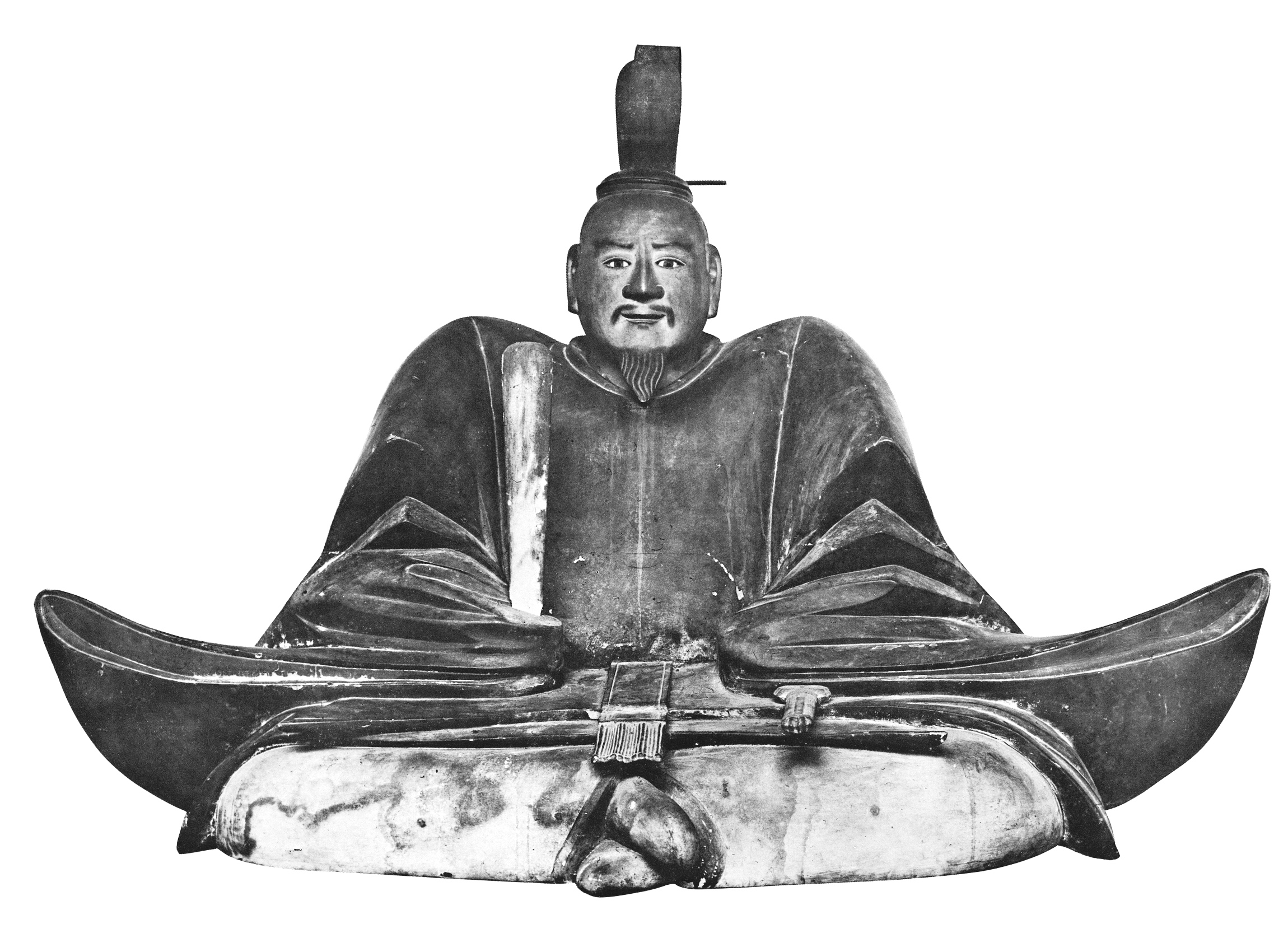
Wooden statue of Ashikaga Yoshiaki at Tōji-in.

In November 21 1567 he was transferred to An'yō-ji Temple in Ichijōdani (present-day Fukui City, Fukui Prefecture), the base of the Asakura clan. In April 15 1568, he came of age and changed his name to Yoshiaki.

There was no effective central authority in Kyoto until Ashikaga Yoshiaki was able to enlist warlord Oda Nobunaga to support his cause. The Oda armies entered Kyoto in 1568, re-establishing the Muromachi shogunate under Ashikaga Yoshiaki as a puppet shōgun. This marked the beginning of the Azuchi–Momoyama period. Ashikaga Yoshihide, the fourteenth shōgun, was deposed without ever entering the capital. Before long, Yoshiaki became dissatisfied with Oda Nobunaga's overlordship and tried to regain state power. In 1569, Yoshiaki's Nijō residence was constructed, becoming a notable symbol of his authority.

=== Yoshiaki's revolt and escape ===
In 1573, Ashikaga Yoshiaki requested the aid of another warlord, Takeda Shingen, in overthrowing the Oda clan. Shingen led a force of about 30,000 westward and routed the army of Nobunaga's ally, Tokugawa Ieyasu, at Mikatagahara. Upon receiving this news, Yoshiaki himself raised an army and plunged into battle against Nobunaga, but Shingen's army never reached Kyoto. Shingen had died of illness. Unaware of this, Yoshiaki continued his fight against Nobunaga but eventually surrendered. Nobunaga spared Yoshiaki's life but decided to banish him from Kyoto. Most historians consider this the Ashikaga shogunate's end. Yoshiaki became a Buddhist monk, shaving his head and taking the name Sho-san, which he later changed to Rei-o In. However, Yoshiaki did not formally relinquish his title as shogun. Accordingly, the empty shell of the Ashikaga shogunate could be said to have continued for several more years. Despite a renewed central authority in Kyoto and Nobunaga's attempt to unify the country, the struggle for power among warring states continued. Yoshiaki acted as a rallying point for anti-Oda forces. He even raised troops himself, and sent them to fight against Nobunaga's army during the Ishiyama Hongan-ji War. In 1576, he sought the support of the Mōri clan, the largest daimyō in Western Japan, and moved his base to Tomo (present-day Fukuyama City). The approximately ten-year period that followed is sometimes referred to as the "Tomo Shogunate (鞆幕府)". Even after Nobunaga had died in 1582, the former shogun continued his efforts to regain power. According to historian Mary Elizabeth Berry, Yoshiaki still resisted Nobunaga's de facto successor Toyotomi Hideyoshi by 1590.

He died in 1597.

== Symbols ==
Ashikaga Yoshiaki's standard was a white Hata-jirushi with golden lettering and a red sun. His banner was white and had "Hachiman Dai Bosatsu" written on it in black.

== Family ==
- Father: Ashikaga Yoshiharu
- Mother: Keijuin (1514–1565)
- Concubines:
  - Osako no Kata
  - Kosaki no Tsubone
- Children:
  - Ashikaga Yoshihiro (1572–1605)
  - Isshi Yoshitaka
  - Nagayama Yoshiari (1575–1635)
  - Yajima Hideyuki

== Eras of Yoshiaki's bakufu ==
The span of years in which Yoshiaki was shōgun are more specifically identified by more than one era name or nengō.

- Eiroku (1558–1570)
- Genki (1570–1573)
- Tenshō (1573–1592)

== Notes ==
Preceded by Ashikaga Yoshihide	Shōgun: Ashikaga Yoshiaki; 1568–1588	Azuchi–Momoyama period
