= Kizawa Nagamasa =

Japanese daimyō

Kizawa Nagamasa (木沢長政) was a daimyō of the Sengoku period in Japan.

Nagamasa built Shigisan Castle for the Hatakeyama clan in 1536, an accomplishment that earned him the title of shugo of Yamato Province. In 1561 he expanded into Shiga Prefecture when he defeated the Rokkaku clan at the Battle of Maibara using ninja from Iga to launch a fire attack. The castle once was his, but the Rokkaku took it only recently before his costly victory.
