= Matsunaga Hisahide =

Japanese feudal lord (1508–1577)

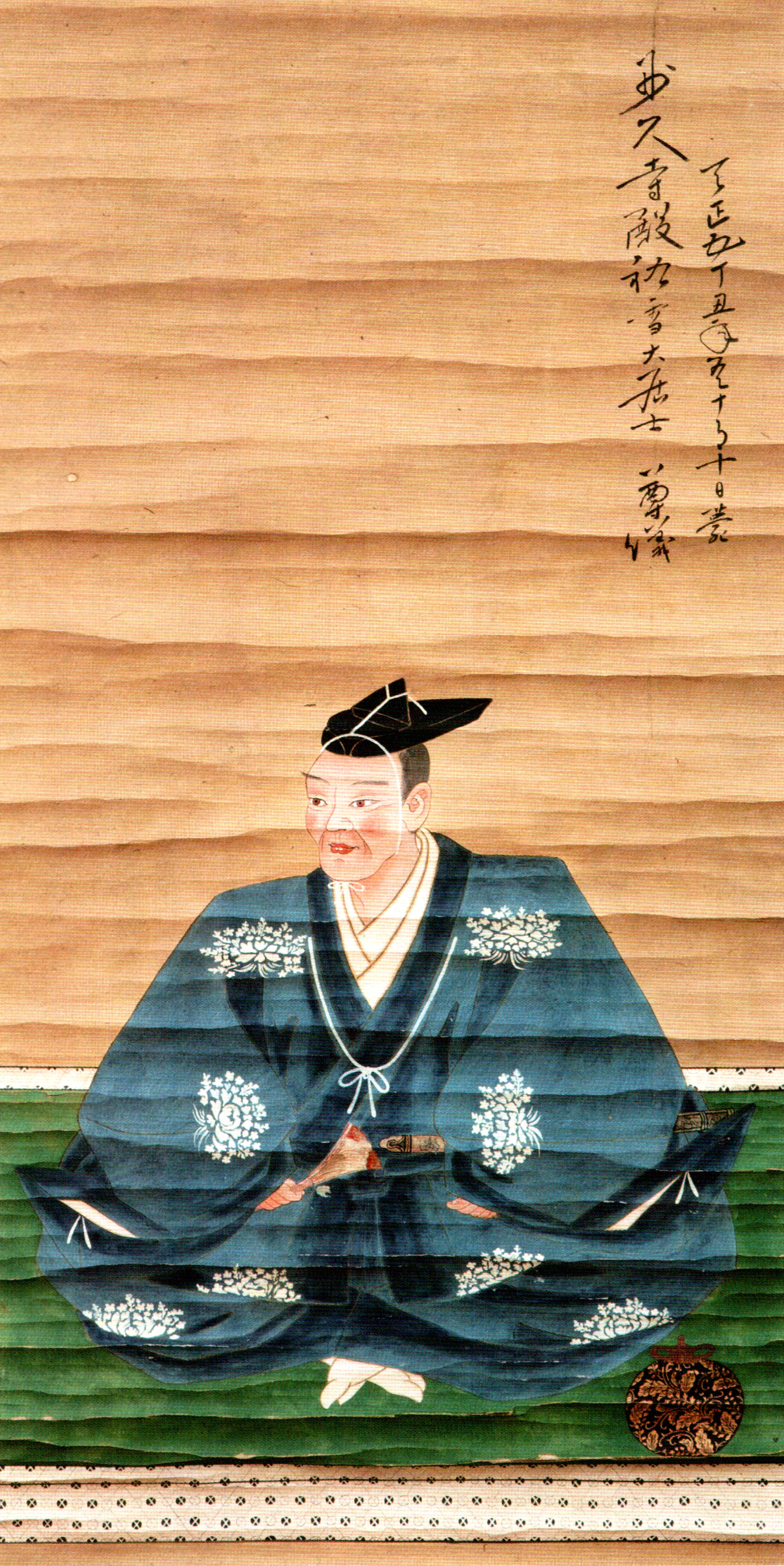

Daimyo of Yamato Province
- In office 1559 – November 19, 1577
- Succeeded by: Tsutsui Junkei

Personal details
- Born: 1508
- Died: November 19, 1577 (aged 68–69) Shigisan Castle, Yamato Province
- Children: Matsunaga Hisamichi; Matsunaga Nagatane
- Parents: Unknown (father); Unknown (mother)
- Relatives: Matsunaga Nagayori (brother); Matsunaga Teitoku (grandson); Matsunaga Sekigo (great grandson)

Military service
- Allegiance: Miyoshi clan Oda clan
- Unit: Matsunaga clan
- Commands: Kyoto (Governor); Yamato Province (Daimyo)
- Battles/wars: Assassination of Samurai, Daimyo and Shogun Ashikaga Yoshiteru (1565); Siege of Shigisan (1577)

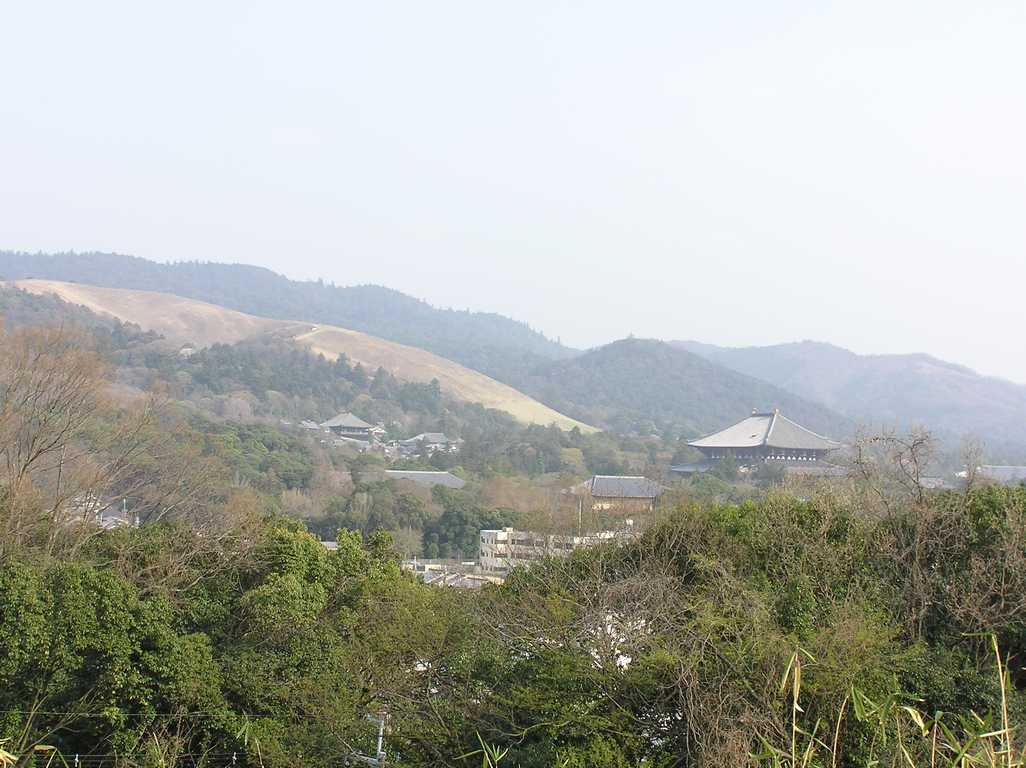
A view over Tōdai-ji, Mountains of Wakakusa, Mikasa and Kasuga from Tamon Castle site

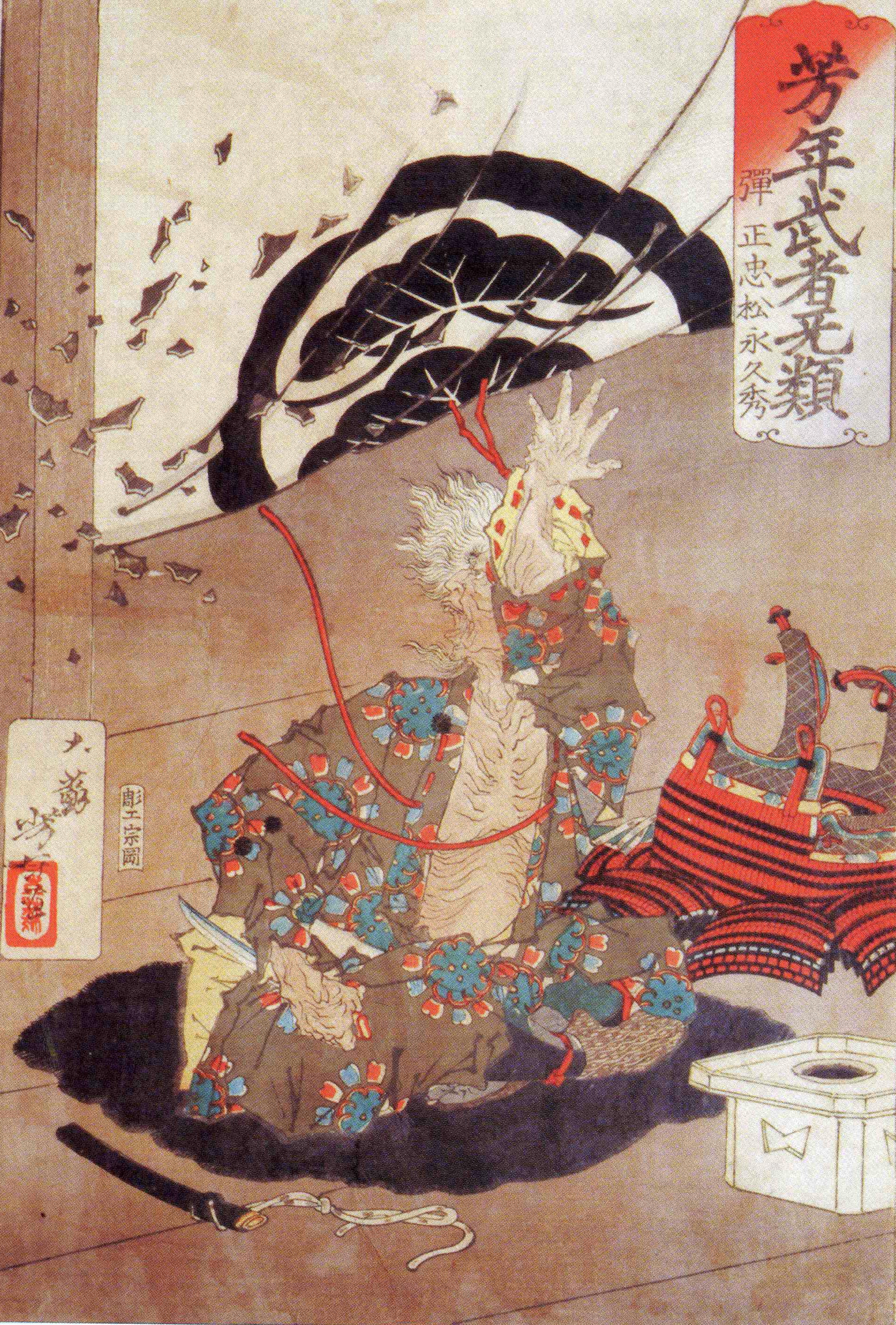
Before killing himself, Hisahide breaking the chagama which Oda Nobunaga wanted. Tsukioka Yoshitoshi

Kōtarō Yoshida portraying Hisahide in the suicide scene from NHK's Taiga drama, Kirin ga Kuru

Matsunaga Danjō Hisahide (松永 弾正 久秀 1508 – November 19, 1577) was a Japanese samurai and daimyō and head of the Yamato Matsunaga clan in Japan during the Sengoku period of the 16th century.

He has historical reputation as one of Japan's Three Great Villains (日本三大梟雄), a nickname which he shared with Ukita Naoie and Saitō Dōsan, due to their ambitious and treasonous personality, along with the habit to resort into underhanded tactics and assassinations to eliminate the oppositions. (Note: Not to be confused with Ashikaga Takauji, Dōkyō and Taira no Kiyomori; who also known with similar sobriquet as Japan's Three Great Villains by Confucian-minded history scholars due to their lack of loyalty to the throne.)

== Biography ==
He was a retainer of Miyoshi Nagayoshi from the 1540s. He directed the conquest of the province of Yamato in the 1560s and by 1564 had built a sufficient power base to be effectively independent. It is believed that he was conspiring against Nagayoshi during this period; from 1561 to 1563 three of Nagayoshi's brothers and his son, Yoshiaki, died. This left Miyoshi Yoshitsugu the adopted heir when Nagayoshi died in 1564, too young to rule. Three men shared his guardianship – Miyoshi Nagayuki, Miyoshi Masayasu, and Iwanari Tomomichi.

In 1565, he then invaded the shōgun Ashikaga Yoshiteru's palace, who then committed suicide. Yoshiteru's brother, Ashikaga Yoshiaki, fled and the shōgun was replaced by his younger cousin, Yoshihide.

In 1566, fighting started between Hisahide and Miyoshi. Initially, the forces of Hisahide were unsuccessful and his apparent destruction of the Buddhist Tōdai-ji in Nara was considered an act of infamy.

In 1568, Oda Nobunaga, with the figurehead Yoshiaki, attacked Hisahide. Nobunaga captured Kyoto in November and Hisahide was forced to submit.

Yoshiaki was made shōgun, a post he held only until 1573 when he attempted to remove himself from Nobunaga's power. Hisahide kept control of the Yamato and served Nobunaga in his extended campaigns against the Miyoshi and others, for a while.

In 1573, Hisahide briefly allied with the Miyoshi clan, but when the hope for success was not achieved he returned to Nobunaga to fight the Miyoshi.

In 1577, Nobunaga besieged him at Shigisan Castle. Defeated but defiant, Hisahide committed suicide. A noted tea master, he destroyed his tea bowl, denying it to his enemies.

He ordered his head destroyed to prevent it from becoming a trophy, so his son, Matsunaga Kojiro, grabbed Hisahide's head and jumped off the castle wall with his sword through his throat. His son, Hisamichi, also committed suicide in the siege.

Hisahide often appears as a shriveled and scheming old man.

== Honours ==
- Senior Fourth Rank, Lower Grade (conferred on January 4, 1561)

== In popular culture ==
See People of the Sengoku period in popular culture.

- Matsunaga Danjō Hisahide is featured in Sengoku Basara 2: Heroes, in which he is depicted as a man of treachery . Hisahide was announced as one of 14 characters to be made playable in the upcoming expansion to Sengoku Basara: Samurai Heroes.
- Hisahide Matsunaga appears as a character in the Samurai Warriors series.
- In Sengoku Basara, he also appears during the challenge.
- In The Ambition of Oda Nobuna, Matsunaga Hisahide is played by a girl who is also known as the Venomous Scorpion. Matsunaga Hisahide is voiced by Masumi Asano in Japanese and by Shelley Calene-Black in English.
- In the 2014 anime Nobunaga Concerto, and its 2015 film adaptation, Matsunaga Hisahide is depicted as a Yakuza member before being transported to the past, Hisahide relishes the chaos of the Sengoku period, believing it to be a battle where only the strongest win. In the anime, he is voiced by Takaya Kuroda and played by Arata Furuta in the film adaption.
- In the 2014 Taiga drama Gunshi Kanbei, Matsunaga Danjō Hisahide is played by actor Mickey Curtis.
- In Nioh (2017), Matsunaga Hisahide makes an appearance in the game and is shown as a spirit residing in an ethereal teapot and referring to himself as "Danjo".
- In Nioh 2 (2020), Matsunaga Hisahide appears in the main storyline and within the game's events, he dies and serves the same purpose as the game before it.
- In the 2020 anime television series Oda Cinnamon Nobunaga, voiced by Ryūsei Nakao. Reincarnated as a chihuahua in modern-day Japan.
- In the 2020 Taiga drama Kirin ga Kuru, Matsunaga Hisahide is played by actor Kōtarō Yoshida.
- Is a playable character in Fate/Grand Order being depicted as a female Berserker class servant voiced by Shion Wakayama.
