= Yan Yiming =

Chinese association football player

Personal information
- Date of birth: 4 February 1998 (age 28)
- Position: Forward

Team information
- Current team: Zibo Cuju
- Number: 19

Youth career
- 2006–2009: Beijing Guoan
- 2009–2012: Beijing Sangao
- 2013–2014: Atlético Madrid
- 2014–2015: Torre Levante
- 2015–2017: Cornellà
- 2017–2018: Deportivo Alavés

Senior career*
Years	Team	Apps	(Gls)
2018–2019	Deportivo Alavés B	0	(0)
2018	→ San Ignacio (loan)	0	(0)
2019	→ Parla (loan)	1	(0)
2019–2020	Atlético Saguntino	0	(0)
2020	Taizhou Yuanda	0	(0)
2021–	Zibo Cuju	26	(1)

International career
- China U18
- China U19
- * Club domestic league appearances and goals as of 14:01, 16 February 2023 (UTC)

Yan Yiming (Chinese: 闫义明; born 4 February 1998) is a Chinese footballer currently playing as a forward for Zibo Cuju.

== Club career ==
=== Early career ===
Yan took an interest in sports as a child, with his father enrolling him in martial arts classes at the age of three, before joining the academy of professional football team Beijing Guoan in 2006. Three years later, he was admitted to the High School Affiliated to Renmin University of China football team, Beijing Sangao, having stood out at trials of over 400 other players.

=== Move to Europe ===
In 2012, Yan proposed pursuing a footballing career in Europe to his father. His father was initially hesitant, but in August of the same year, Yan moved to Spain, finding a personal football coach who got him in touch with professional side Villarreal. Following a trial with Villarreal, the club asked him to stay longer, and Yan's father moved from Beijing to help support his son's career in Spain.

His first official club in Spain was Atlético Madrid, where he spent the 2013–14 season. He also played for Torre Levante and Cornellà, before joining then-La Liga side Deportivo Alavés in 2017. While at Deportivo Alavés, he was loaned out to lower division sides San Ignacio and Parla. Following his departure from Deportivo Alavés, he joined Atlético Saguntino on a permanent deal in November 2019. He was named on the bench three times for Atlético Saguntino, but did not make an appearance for the club.

=== Return to China ===
Yan returned to China in 2020, joining China League One side Taizhou Yuanda, but did not make an appearance for the club.

== Career statistics ==
=== Club ===
As of 16 February 2023.

Appearances and goals by club, season and competition
Club	Season	League			Cup		Other		Total	
Club	Season	Division	Apps	Goals	Apps	Goals	Apps	Goals	Apps	Goals
Deportivo Alavés B	2018–19	Tercera División	0	0	0	0	0	0	0	0
San Ignacio (loan)	2018–19	Tercera División	0	0	0	0	0	0	0	0
Parla (loan)	2018–19	Tercera División	1	0	0	0	0	0	1	0
Atlético Saguntino	2019–20	Tercera División	0	0	0	0	0	0	0	0
Atlético Saguntino	Total		1	0	0	0	0	0	1	0
Taizhou Yuanda	2020	China League One	0	0	0	0	0	0	0	0
Zibo Cuju	2021	China League One	14	1	1 (Note: Appearances in the Chinese FA Cup)	0	0	0	15	1
Zibo Cuju	2022	China League One	12	0	1	1	0	0	13	1
Zibo Cuju	Total		26	1	2	1	0	0	28	2
Career total			27	1	2	1	0	0	29	2
