= Matsunaga clan =

Japanese samurai clan

Matsunaga clan 松永
- Matsunaga clan mon
- Home province: Mikawa
- Parent house: Fujiwara clan
- Titles: Daimyō
- Founder: Matsunaga Hisahide - Yamato Matsunaga clan
- Founding year: 16th century
- Dissolution: 1577 with the suicide of Matsunaga Hisahide

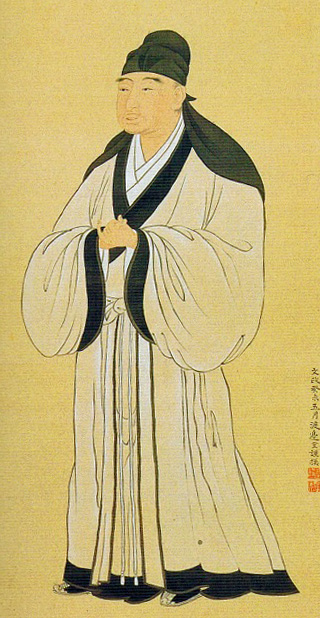
Fujiwara Seika's younger sister married into the Matsunaga clan

The Matsunaga clan (松永氏, Matsunaga-shi) is a Japanese samurai clan who are descended from the Fujiwara clan.

The lineage of Matsunaga Danjō Hisahide strengthens the Matsunaga clan's claim to Fujiwara lineage through Hisahide's nephew, Tadatoshi Naito (also known as Naito Joan and Fujiwara John). Tadatoshi Naito's mother was Naito Sadafusa who was from the Naito clan. The Naito clan is descended from Fujiwara no Hidesato (Fujiwara Hok-ke). Tadatoshi Naito would serve as lord of Yagi castle.

Hisahide's granddaughter, Matsunaga Teitoku (松永貞徳) also strengthened the Matsunaga clan's link to the Fujiwara clan. Her mother was the older sister of Fujiwara Seika (藤原惺窩). Teitoku's cousin was Tadatoshi Naito.

Other sources suggest that the Matsunaga clan descended from the Minamoto clan and via Takenouchi no Sukune, himself a descendant of Emperor Kogen. Sukune called himself Matsunaga Ki, after Matsunaga no sho, the domain of Onyu, in Wakasa Province. This means the Matsunaga clan is descended from the Ki clan, one of the noble clans.

== Mikawa Matsunaga clan ==
It was a powerful clan in the Mikawa Province. Matsunaga Heiza'emon (松平平左衛門) served Matsudaira Kiyoyasu (松平清康), who was the 7th head of the Matsudaira clan and grandfather of Tokugawa Ieyasu. Heiza'emon's son, Genzo (源藏) served Ieyasu which can be seen in Kansei Choshu Shokafu (genealogies of vassals in Edo Bakufu). The Matsunagas in this clan used the tsuta mon (ivy) as their family crest.

Descendants of this clan continued to serve the Tokugawa Bakufu. Other Japanese people, who used the Matsunaga name but were not samurai retainers, originated from this area. Some emigrated to Hawaii, United States and Brazil in the late 1800s.

== Yamato Matsunaga clan ==
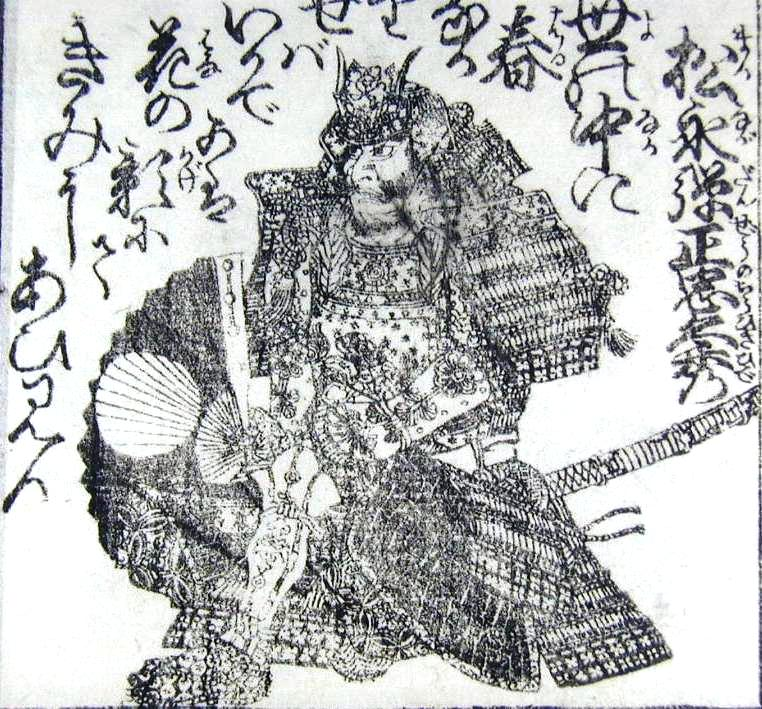
Matsunaga Danjō Hisahide, one of the few portraits where he is not shown as an old shrewd man

The Matsunaga clan that follows the lineage of Matsunaga Danjō Hisahide (松永弾正久秀) is the most famous in Japan. Hisahida was the daimyō of the Yamato Province during the Sengoku period. He was born in the year 1508 and shares the same roots with the Fujiwara clan as the Matsunaga clan in the Mikawa Province. They both used the same tsuta-mon (ivy) as their family crest. In Japan, when people think of the Matsunaga clan, it is usually Hisahide they are referring to.

Hisahide served as the main retainer for Miyoshi Nagayoshi of the Miyoshi clan in the Yamato Province. He also served as retainer briefly for the Oda clan. Together with Ukita Naoie and Saito Dosan, they became known as Japan's three greatest villains.

Hisahide's actual title was Danjō Shohitsu (弾正少弼) which was positioned under the vice minister of Danjō with the Senior Fourth Rank, Lower Grade. He would become the daimyō of the Yamato Province.

Hisahide later committed seppuku after Oda Nobunaga besieged him at Shigisan Castle in 1577. Both of his sons, Kojiro and Hisamichi (松永久通), also committed seppuku during the siege. Hisahide's two sons held hostage by Nobunaga in Kyoto were ordered to be executed as well.

=== Hizen and Higo Matsunaga Clans ===
Hisamichi, the heir of Hisahide, had a son named Hikobe’e Ichimaru or Kazumaru (彦兵衛一丸). He moved down to Hakata, Chikuzen Province, opened a pawnshop, and became a wealthy merchant. Hikobe's descendants became retainers of the Saga Domain. They include Matsunaga Munetomo (松永宗伴) as a retainer of the Saga Domain and Matsunaga Shouemon (松永所右衛門) as a retainer of Kashima Domain which was a branched domain of the Saga Domain.

There was also another Matsunaga clan that was started by Kuen (松永空圓), a Buddhist monk who claimed himself as a younger brother of Matsunaga Hisahide. Their family crest is the pattern based on Japanese ginger and similar patterns but not the ivy ones (tsuta-mon) which had given from the Ryuzoji clan (龍造寺氏) which was one of the warlords that dominated the area.

=== Karatsu Matsunaga Clan ===
Matsunaga Toh (松永東), who served as the Speaker of the 45th House of Representatives and the 79th Minister of Education, had Matsunaga family roots in Karatsu, Saga, at the time part of the Saga Domain. The Matsunagas in the Karatsu Domain were not very wealthy but were well known for being model farmers.

=== Descendants of Matsunaga Danjō Hisahide ===
The following are some acknowledged descendants of Hisahide:

- Matsunaga Teitoku (松永貞徳) - Grandson of Hisahide.
- Matsunaga Sekigo - Great-grandson of Hisahide
- Matsunaga Munetomo (松永宗伴)
- Matsunaga Shouemon (松永所右衛門)
- Baron Matsunaga Masatoshi (松永正敏 1851–1912) - Lieutenant General and commander of the IJA Sendai Division.
- Matsunaga Toh (松永東 born 1887) - Liberal Democratic Party (LDP) politician who served as the 45th Speaker of the House of Representatives and 79th Minister of Education.
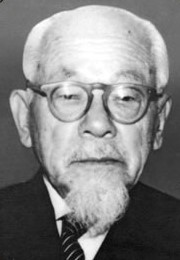
  Toh Matsunaga when he took office as the Minister of Education
  He has family roots from Karatsu.
- Matsunaga Hikaru (松永光 1928–2022) - the 62nd Liberal Democratic Party (LDP) politician who briefly served as Minister of Finance from 27 January to 30 July 1998
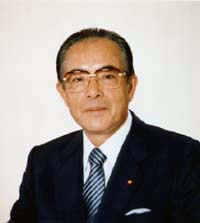
  Matsunaga Hikaru - Minister of Finance from 27 January to 30 July 1998
  . He was the adopted son of Toh Matsunaga.
- Matsunaga Sadaichi (松永貞市 1892–1965) - Vice Admiral of the Imperial Japanese Navy. He adopted the Matsunaga name after marrying the daughter of Izuyo Matsunaga. His son is Ichiro and his granddaughter, Mari.
- Matsunaga Ichiro (松永市郎 1919–2005) - Imperial Navy Captain and the father of Mari.
- Matsunaga Mari (松永真理 1954–present) - founder of i-mode mobile service in Japan. Mari is currently serving as board of director for Rohto Pharmaceutical Co., Ltd., and Seiko Epson Corporation.

Other Danjō Hisahide descendants are spread across Saga, Nagasaki, and Fukuoka Prefectures. Some descendants moved from Kyushu to the Saitama Prefecture with others immigrating to the United States in the late 1960s and early 1970s.
