= Ashikaga Yoshiteru =

Japanese Samurai, Daimyo and Military ruler of Japan from 1546 to 1565

- 足利 義輝
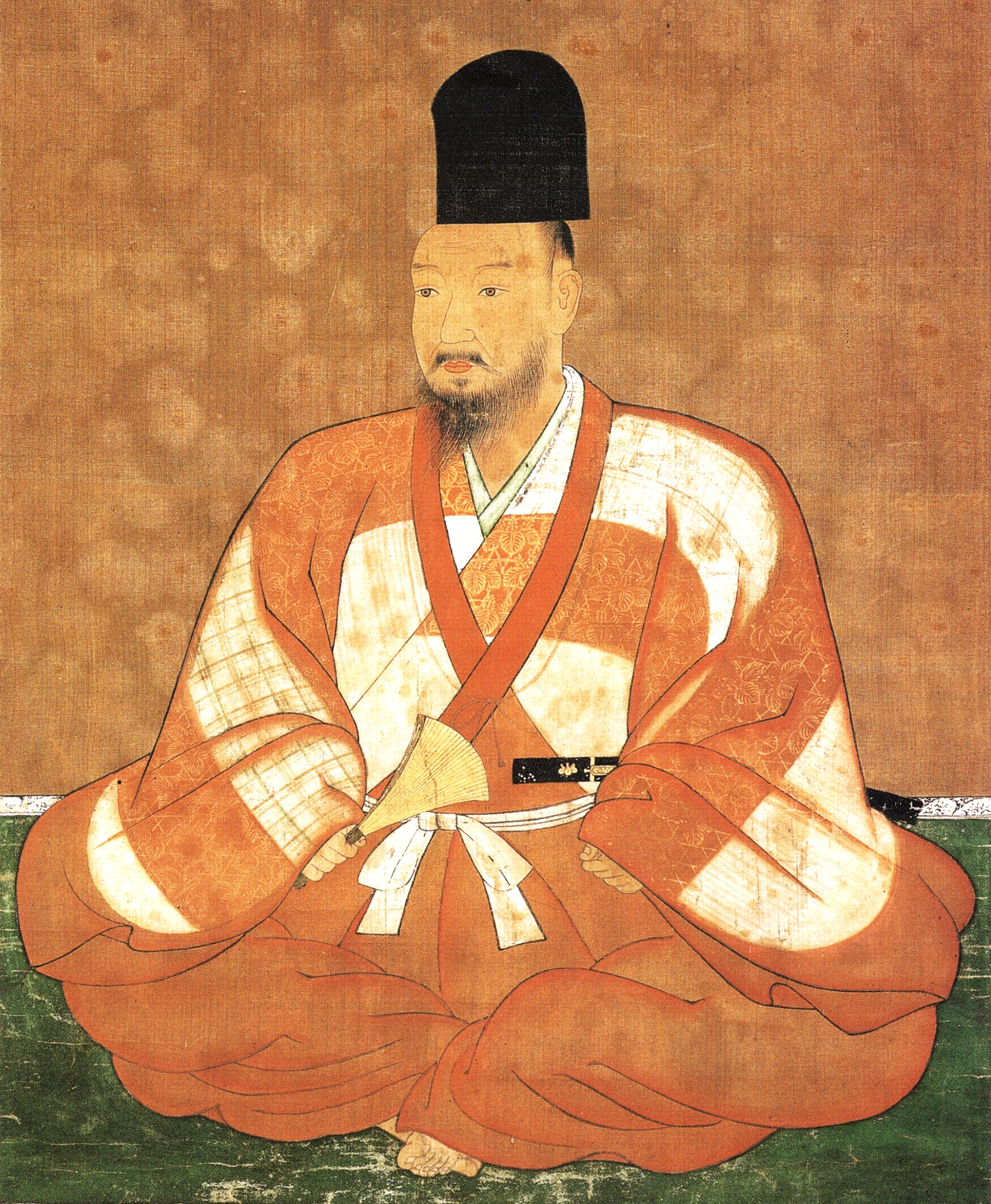

Shōgun
- In office 1545–1565
- Monarchs: Go-Nara; Ōgimachi
- Preceded by: Ashikaga Yoshiharu
- Succeeded by: Ashikaga Yoshihide

Personal details
- Born: March 31, 1536
- Died: June 17, 1565 (aged 29)
- Spouse: Daughter of Konoe Taneie
- Parents: Ashikaga Yoshiharu (father); Keiju-in, daughter of Konoe Hisamichi (mother)
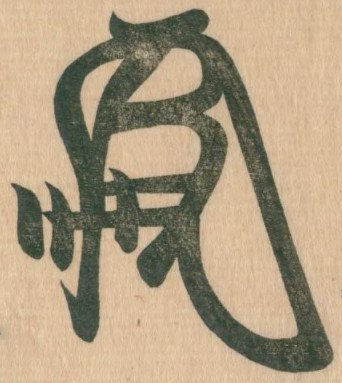
- Signature

Ashikaga Yoshiteru (足利 義輝; March 31, 1536 – June 17, 1565), also known as Yoshifushi or Yoshifuji, was a Japanese samurai, daimyo and the 13th shōgun of the Ashikaga shogunate who reigned from 1546 to 1565 during the late Muromachi period of Japan. He was the eldest son of the 12th shōgun, Ashikaga Yoshiharu, and his mother was a daughter of Konoe Hisamichi (later called 慶寿院, Keijuin). When he became shogun in 1546 at age 11, Yoshiteru's name was Yoshifushi (sometimes transliterated as Yoshifuji); but some years later in 1554, he changed his name to the one by which he is conventionally known today. His childhood name was Kikubemaru (菊童丸). His younger brother Ashikaga Yoshiaki became the fifteenth shōgun.

== Installed as shōgun ==
After his father, Yoshiharu, was forced to retire in 1546 over a political struggle with Hosokawa Harumoto, Yoshiteru became Sei-i Taishōgun, albeit a puppet shōgun like his father. Yoshiteru was only 11 at the time and his investiture ceremony was held at Sakamoto, Ōmi Province, outside Kyoto.

Yoshiteru had barely been confirmed as shōgun when his father Yoshiharu made a truce with Harumoto to return to Kyoto. Yet, Harumoto's retainer Miyoshi Nagayoshi parted with Harumoto to take the side of Hosokawa Ujitsuna and the two Hosokawa started a war that drove out Yoshiteru, his father Yoshiharu, and Harumoto as well, from Kyoto. In 1550, Yoshiharu died in Ōmi, unable to return to Kyoto.

In 1552, Yoshiteru made a peace with Nagayoshi to return to Kyoto. However, the next year, Yoshiteru and Harumoto started a war against Nagayoshi to remove his influence. With the help of Rokkaku Yoshikata, the war initially went well for Yoshiteru but he was driven out of Kyoto again in 1558 with a counterattack from Nagayoshi. Nagayoshi did not press on after the victory to kill Yoshiteru for fear of being accused of killing a shogun, and instead signed a truce to have Yoshiteru back in Kyoto under his influence. Nagayoshi continued as the real power in Kyoto, with Yoshiteru nothing more than a rubber stamp.

Finally, in 1565, Matsunaga Hisahide invaded Kyoto, which led to a tragic turn of events as Yoshiteru decided to take his own life.

== Governance ==
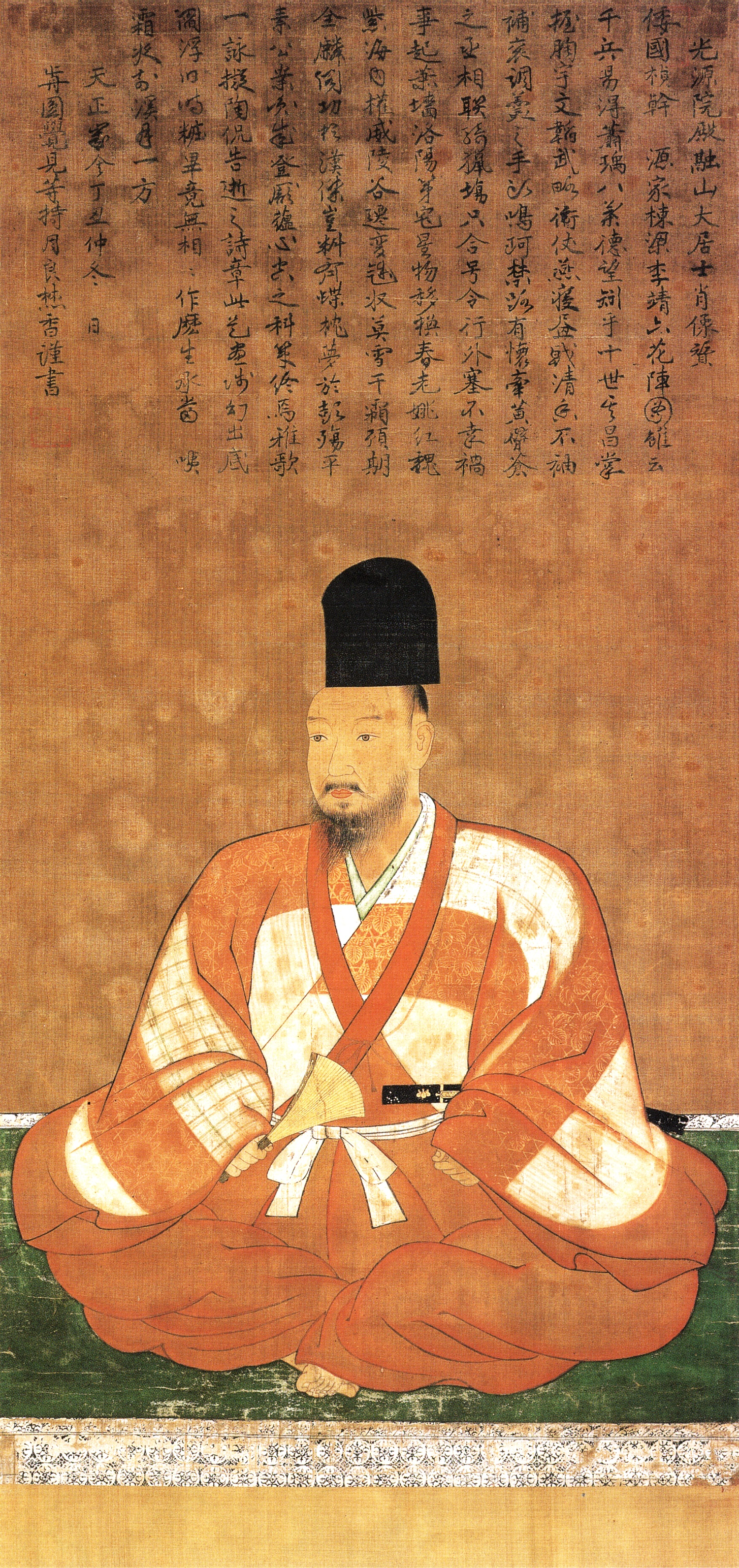
Yoshiteru, formal portrait

Surrounded by daimyō who intended only to use the authority of shogun for their own good, Yoshiteru still managed to reaffirm the shōgun's authority by active diplomacy that extended to every part of Japan. By trying to negotiate a peace between such well-known daimyō as Takeda Shingen and Uesugi Kenshin, Shimazu Takahisa, Ōtomo Yoshishige, Mōri Motonari, and Amago Haruhisa, the shogun's authority was again recognized by various daimyō. Lacking resources, Yoshiteru nevertheless saw opportunities to assign his kanji "輝" on various samurai such as Mōri Terumoto to become something close to a godfather. Yoshiteru was well respected for his actions and many researchers credit him as being the last effective shōgun to hold the post. Oda Nobunaga and Uesugi Kenshin were among the many daimyō and samurai who travelled to Kyoto to pay their respects to the shōgun.

== End of reign ==
In 1564, Nagayoshi died of illness and Yoshiteru saw an opportunity to fully reclaim the shōgun's authority. However, Matsunaga Danjo Hisahide and the three member council of Miyoshi, the Miyoshi Triumvirs, who wanted to rule just as Nagayoshi had, were willing to go to any lengths to remove Yoshiteru from the power and to have Ashikaga Yoshihide as the puppet shōgun.

In 1565, Matsunaga Danjo Hisahide's son Matsunaga Hisamichi and Miyoshi Yoshitsugu laid siege against a collection of buildings (that would later become Nijō Castle) where Yoshiteru lived. With no help arriving in time from the daimyōs that could have supported him, Yoshiteru and the few troops under him were overrun by Miyoshi.

In his account of the overthrow of Ashikaga Yoshiteru, Jesuit missionary Father Luís Fróis mentioned the strong homosexual relationship between Yoshiteru and his squire, Odachidono. According to Father Fróis, the shōgun's squire, Odachidono:

fought so valiantly and with such intrepid spirit that all the rebels started to shout out that he should not be killed, but that he should be taken alive. Nonetheless, seeing his master die, and believing it a great dishonour to survive him, the youth threw away his sword, and pulling out his dagger, he cut open his throat and then his belly. Finally he killed himself by lying down flat with the dagger in his belly.

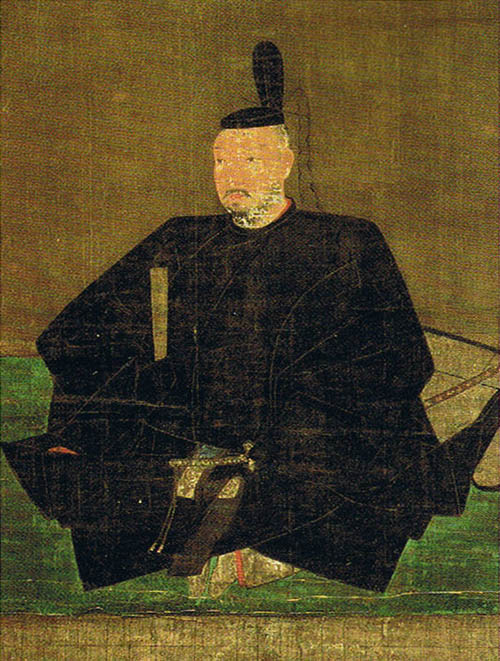
Ashikaga Yoshiteru in Sokutai.

Three years passed before his cousin Ashikaga Yoshihide became the fourteenth shōgun.

== Legacy ==
Because of his inner strength and the katana skills that he was known to have practiced regularly, Yoshiteru was called the "Kengo shōgun" (剣豪将軍) and was closer to being a samurai and a warlord than any shōgun since Ashikaga Takauji. One of his sword-fighting instructors was Tsukahara Bokuden, the founder of Kashima Shintō-ryū. His governance was highly credited but to have been killed in spite of his efforts completely destroyed what little recognition and authority Yoshiteru built up.

The waka Yoshiteru was said to have left on his death shows the extent of his aspirations compared with the limits of achievements.

Kanji	Rōmaji	English
五月雨は 露か涙か 不如帰 我が名をあげよ 雲の上まで	samidare wa tsuyu ka namida ka hototogisu waga na o ageyo kumo no ue made	The May rain falls, and is it my tears or the mist that surround me? Hototogisu, take my name and soar above the clouds

== Family ==
- Father: Ashikaga Yoshiharu
- Mother: Keijuin (1514–1565)
- Wife: daughter of Konoe Taneie
- Concubines:
  - Kojiju no Tsubone
  - Karasumaru-dono
- Children:
  - Teruwakamaru (1562–1562)
  - nun in Kyokoji temple
  - nun in Kyokoji temple
  - Ashikaga Yoshitaka
  - Oike Yoshitatsu by Karasumaru-dono

== Eras of Yoshiteru's bakufu ==
There were more than one era name or nengō in which Yoshiteru was identified as Shogun .

- Tenbun (1532–1555)
- Kōji (1555–1558)
- Eiroku (1558–1570)

== Tenka-Goken ==
The "Mikazuki Munechika" is another one of Japan’s Tenka-Goken and is considered the most beautiful of the five blades. This tachi style samurai sword was created Sanjô Munechika and was named for its crescent moon shape (mikazuki). Like all of the Tenka-Goken, the Mikazuki Munechika is one of Japan’s National Treasures and is currently on display at the Tokyo National Museum.

Over its long history, the Mikazuki Munechika has been owned by several important Japanese families. During the mid-16th century, the Mikazuki Munechika belonged to the Ashikaga family and the sword was used by shogun Ashikaga Yoshiteru to defend himself until he died during an attack on the palace by the Miyoshi family. The sword, along with other Ashikaga treasures, was taken by Miyoshi Masayasu. The Mikazuki Munechika was passed down a few more times before it was owned by the Tokugawa family.

== Notes ==
Preceded by Ashikaga Yoshiharu	Shōgun: Ashikaga Yoshiteru; 1546–1565	Succeeded by Ashikaga Yoshihide
