= Ashikaga Yoshihide =

Military ruler of Japan in 1568

- 足利 義栄
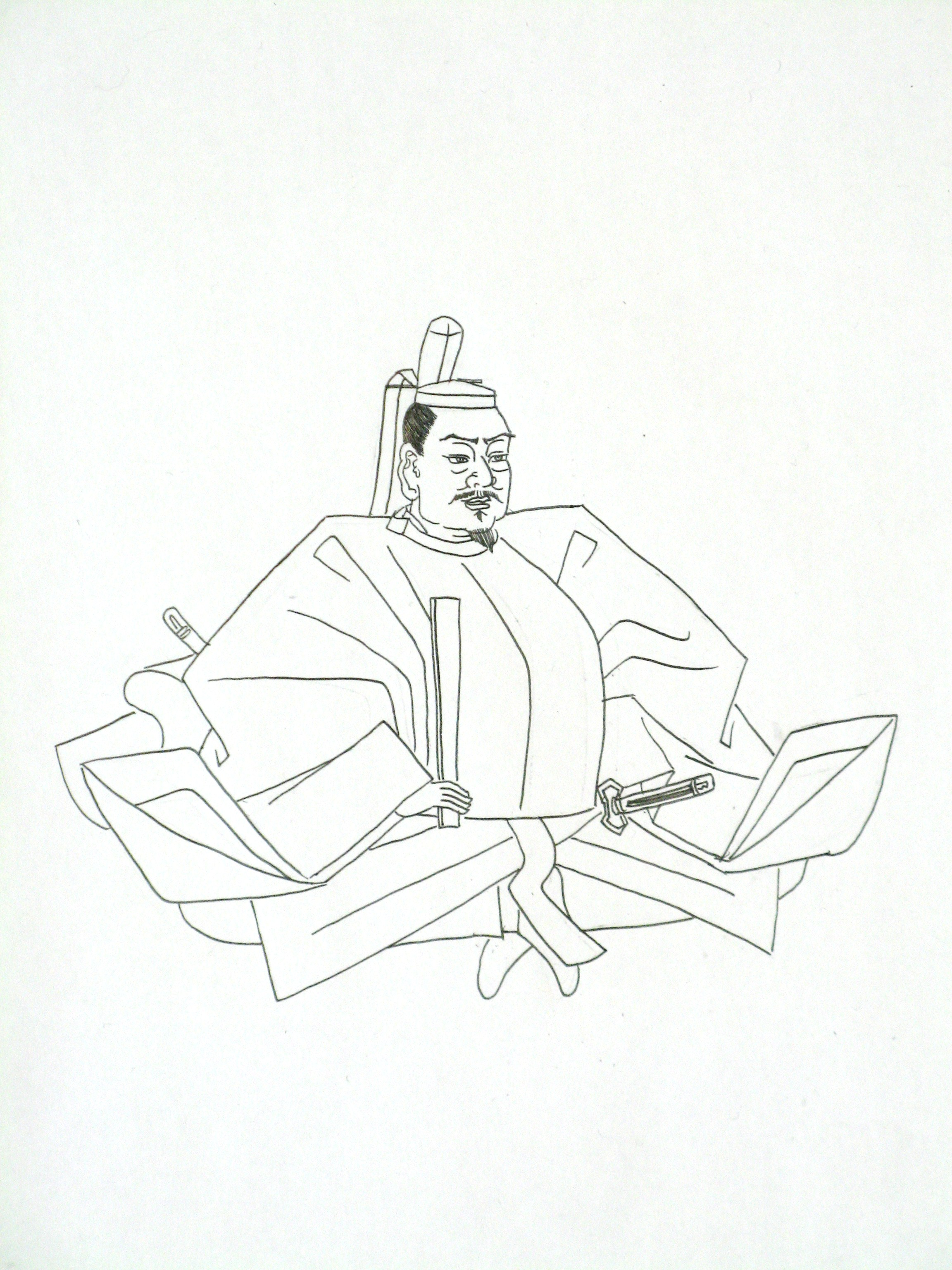

Shōgun
- In office 1564–1568
- Monarch: Ōgimachi
- Preceded by: Ashikaga Yoshiteru
- Succeeded by: Ashikaga Yoshiaki

Personal details
- Born: 1538
- Died: October 28, 1568
- Parents: Ashikaga Yoshitsuna (father); Daughter of Ōuchi Yoshioki (mother)

Ashikaga Yoshihide (足利 義栄; 1538 – October 28, 1568) was the 14th shōgun of the Ashikaga shogunate, who held nominal power for a few months in 1568 during the Muromachi period of Japan. He became shōgun three years after the death of his cousin, the 13th shōgun Ashikaga Yoshiteru.

When Yoshihide became shōgun, he changed his name to Yoshinaga; however, today, he is more conventionally recognized by the name Yoshihide.

== Biography ==
Shortly after having been proclaimed shōgun, Yoshihide died from a contagious disease. In the same month, Oda Nobunaga marched his armies into Kyoto, the capital, and seized control. Nobunaga installed Ashikaga Yoshiaki as the fifteenth shōgun.

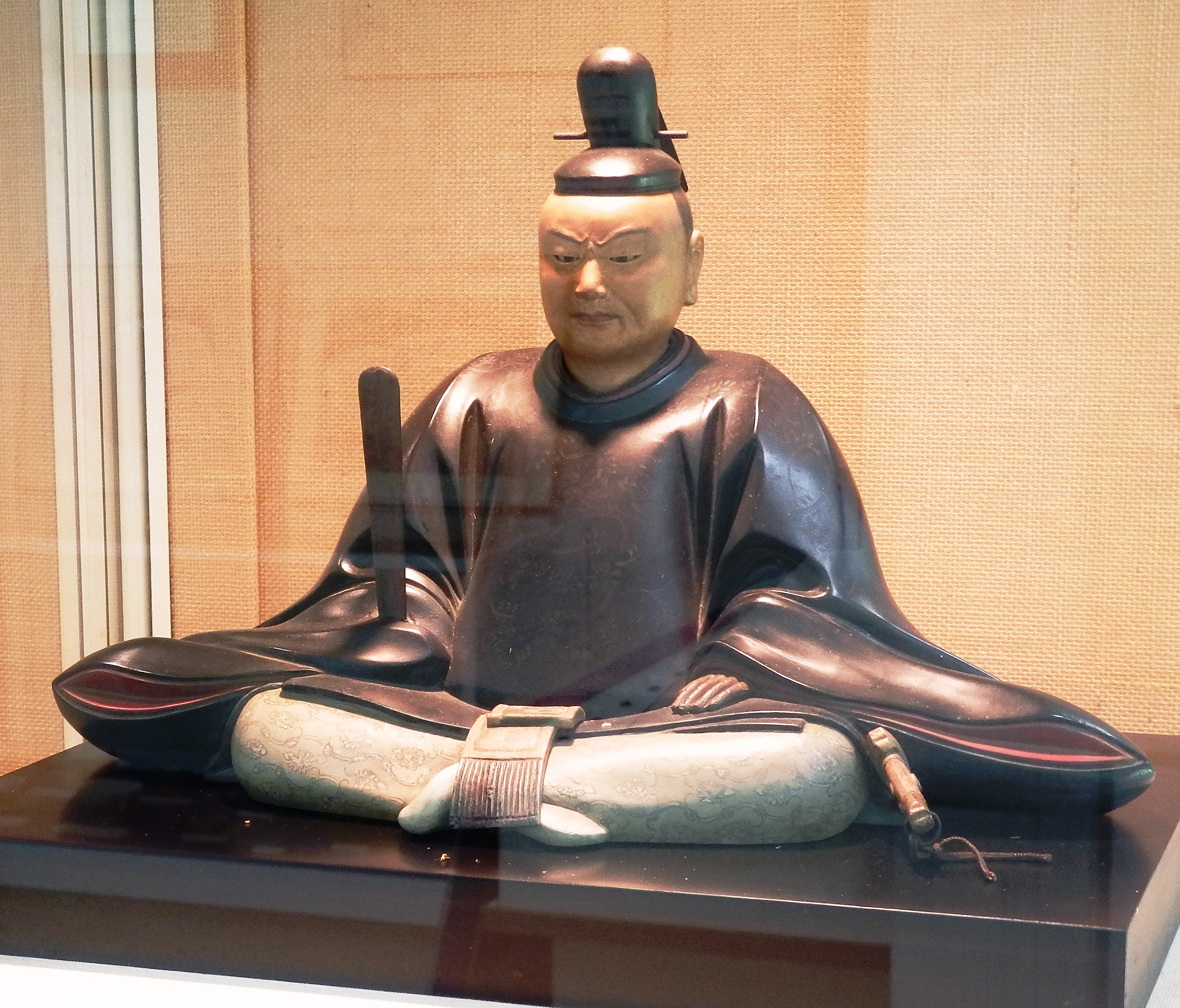
Wooden statue of Ashikaga Yoshihide

== Family ==
- Father: Ashikaga Yoshitsuna
- Mother: Daughter of Ōuchi Yoshioki
- Wife: Yuki no Tsubone

== Era of Yoshihide's bakufu ==
The year in which Yoshihide was shogun is encompassed within a single era name or nengō.

- Eiroku (1558–1570)

== Notes ==
Preceded by Ashikaga Yoshiteru	Shōgun: Ashikaga Yoshihide; 1568	Succeeded by Ashikaga Yoshiaki
