= Yoshinori Akazawa =

Contemporary Artist

- 赤沢嘉則
- Born: 1971 (age 54–55)
- Other name: Akazawa Roseki V
- Education: Kyoto City University of Arts
- Occupation: Contemporary Artist
- Website: Official site yoshinoriakazawa.com

Yoshinori Akazawa (Japanese: ⾚澤 嘉則, romanized: Akazawa Yoshinori, born 1971 -) is a contemporary artist and ceramicist. He is known as the 5th generation head of the Akazawa Roseki studio (Akazawa Roseki V), specializing in traditional and contemporary Japanese ceramics.

== Early life and education ==
Yoshinori Akazawa was born to the ceramic artist Akazawa Roseki IV, a lineage with a history as ceramic spanning around 150 years. Until the Edo period, Akazawa, his family line served as temple officials (tera-samurai) at Myoshin-ji Temple for generations.

Akazawa studied Japanese painting called Nihonga, the foundation of visual expression, at Kyoto City University of Arts. Furthermore, at several ceramics research facilities, he explored contemporary artistic expression by fusing traditional Kyō ware and Kiyomizu ware ware techniques with original ideas while exploring modern artistic expressions.

== Artistic Style and Philosophy ==
Akazawa defines his artistic concept as "The Art of Governing Light." While Western art forms like Italian mosaics often emphasize the beauty of "transmitted light," Akazawa focuses on capturing and fixing light onto the surface of ceramics—a medium rooted in the earth. Through this approach, he reinterprets the vibrant glazes of traditional Kochi-yaki (Kochi ware, Cochin ware) as a means of controlling luminosity .

== Awards and Activities ==
- 2009: Received the “3rd Purchasing Prize” at the 10th Ex-tempore Piran International Ceramics, Piran, Slovenia.
- 2009: Received the “Prize of Medal of Rotary Club Faenza” at the 56th Faenza prize, MIC/International Museum of Ceramics in Faenza, Faenza, Italy.
- 2017: Received the “Prize of Targa Argent” and “Honorable mention” at the 39th International Ceramic Art Competition of Gualdo Tadino City, Gualdo Tadino, Italy.
- 2024: Received the "Prima Segnalata" Award at the International Ceramic Art Competition "CERAMICS IN LOVE – MARCO POLO" in Italy.
- Selected Works: Created and dedicated 15 fusuma-e (fusuma paintings) to Sōken-ji Temple at the ruins of Azuchi Castle.

== Public Collection ==
- Museum of Kyoto
- Kyoto Municipal Museum of Art
- Azuchi castle ruins Sōken-ji temple
- International Museum of Ceramics in Faenza, Italy
- Art Museum of City of Ravenna, Italy
- Raffaele Bendandi House Museum, Faenza, Italy
- Gualdo Tadino Contemporary Ceramic Art Collection, Gualdo Tadino, Italy
- Palazzo Botton, Castellamonte, Italy
- Musée Ariana
- Cultur center Kapfenberg Museum, Austria
- Herman Pečarič gallery, Piran, Slovenia
- Rothko Museum
- Bolu Abant İzzet Baysal University
- Museum of Ceramics in La Rambla, Spain
- Museum of Ceramics in L’Alcora, Spain
- Museus d’Esplugues de Llobregat, Barcelona, Spain
- Caldas da Rainha Municipality Museum, Portugal
- Changchun International Ceramics Gallery, China
- National Ceramic Art Center, Tunisia
