= Azuchi religious debate =

1579 Buddhist debate in Japan

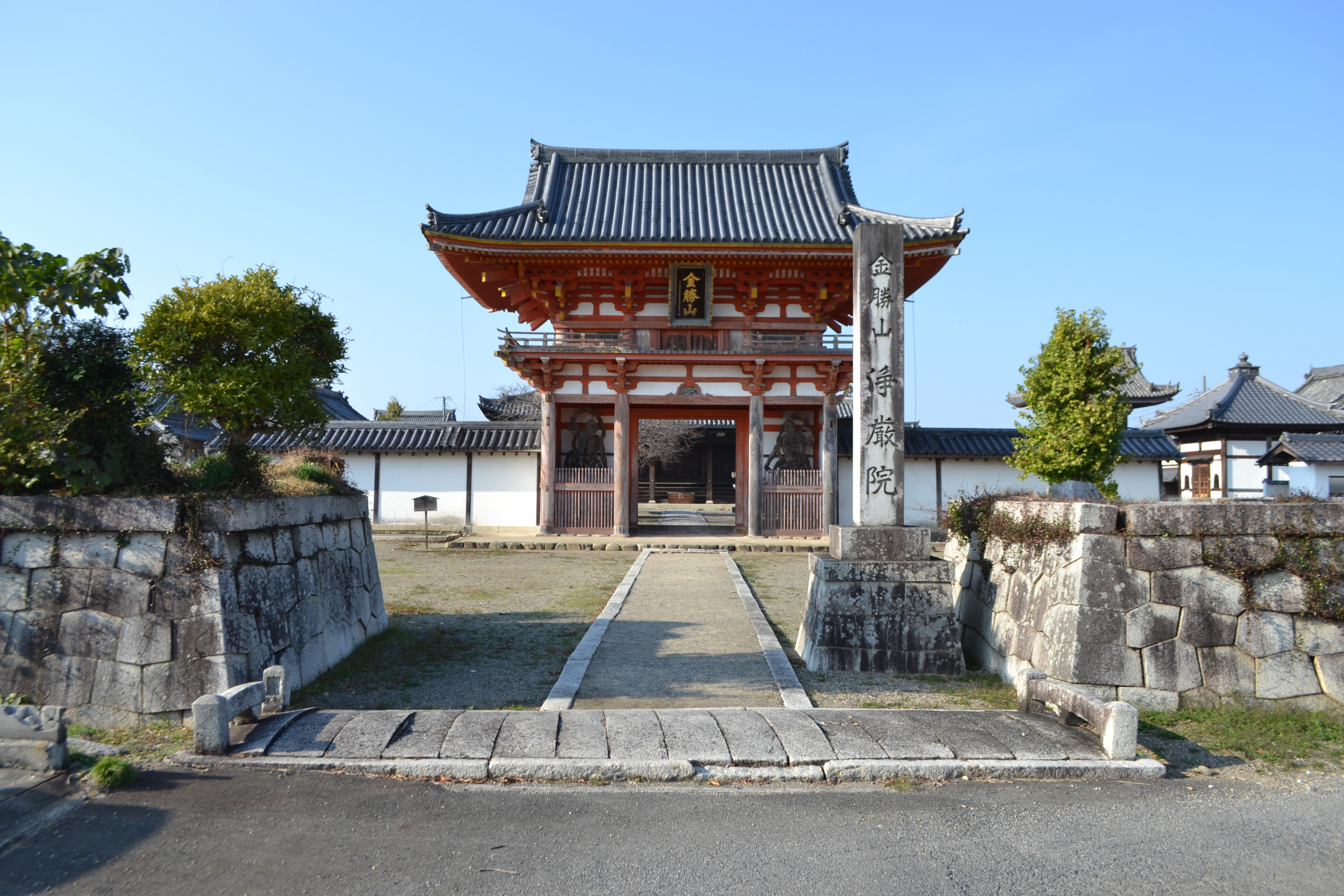
Jōgon-in, the temple where the debate took place

The Azuchi religious debate (安土宗論, Azuchi shūron) took place between monks of the Nichiren and Jōdo-shū sects of Japanese Buddhism, at Jōgon-in near Oda Nobunaga's Azuchi Castle in 1579.

== Background ==
The incident was caused by a number of disturbances caused by Nichiren followers intolerant of Jōdo thought and practices. The particular event that directly caused the incident came about in early June 1579 after the arrival of the Jōdo-shū priest Gyokunen Reiyo in Azuchi, when he was accosted by two Nichiren laymen by the names of Takebe Jōchi and Ōwaki Densuke. Reiyo asked to challenge the priest who had converted these men, citing that the two hecklers were mere novices, and that attempting to explain Buddhist teachings to them would be useless due to their inexperience. This was accepted by Nichiren masters, who sent a large delegation of priests and laymen from Kyoto. Oda Nobunaga, who effectively ruled most of central Japan at the time, and had many Nichiren adherents as his personal retainers, decided to arbitrate the matter himself, encouraging both sides to stay calm. At first Nobunaga forbade the debate, having had a long history of low tolerance for the hypocrisy of violence or competition for power among religious groups. In addition, some scholars claimed that he feared the incident could cause a large-scale uprising in the Kinai. The Nichiren priests, being sure they would triumph, ignored his order and demanded a debate. With this, Nobunaga consented to the discussion, appointing prelate Shū of Hino as the judge of the debate.

== The Debate ==
The debate took place in the Buddha Hall of Jōgon-in, a Jōdo-shū temple on the outskirts of the town of Azuchi.

The representatives of the Nichiren sect were Nichikō of Chōmyōji, Jōkōin, Kuon’in, Myōkokuji, and Fuden. Daizōbō of the Myōkenji acted as the scribe. They dressed in magnificent robes and brought the Lotus Sutra in eight scrolls, as well as an ink stone and paper. The representatives of Jōdo-shū on the other hand, those being Gyokunen Reiyo from Kantō and Teian from Tanaka in Azuchi, wore simple black robes and brought their own writing materials. Reiyo requested that he do the talking, having been the priest first challenged by the two laymen, but Teian was better at speech and debate, and thus he was the one who spoke for the Jōdo-shū sect.

The dialogue between Teian and the Nichiren priests revolved around the invocation of Amida Buddha in the Lotus Sutra and the Pure Land doctrine. Teian questioned Nichiren's teaching that the nembutsu (the primary practice of the Jōdo sects) causes one to fall into the Hell of Incessant Suffering. In response to this, the Nichiren sect asked if the Amida in the Lotus Sutra and the Amida of the Pure Land school are the same. Teian asserted that Amida is one and the same entity, regardless of where he is found. In response to this, the Nichiren sect asked Teian why Jōdo-shū rejected the Amida of the Lotus Sutra, asserting that its followers were encouraged to 'discard, close, seal, and abandon' the Lotus Sutra. Teian argued that this rejection is not about discarding other practices but rather about setting aside other practices except for the nembutsu at first to attain the mental faculty for devoutly practicing the nembutsu, further citing testimonies from the Pure Land sutras to support this view. The Nichiren priests countered using the Sutra of Infinite Meaning, where Sakyamuni Buddha acknowledges using expedient devices over forty years without yet revealing the truth. To this, Teian challenged the Nichiren priests, asking whether they also reject the sublimity of the Lotus Sutra if they reject the forty years of doctrines before the Lotus Sutra as mere preliminaries. The Nichiren spokesman became silent at this, leading to the raucous laughter of the entire hall and the stripping of his stole.

== Aftermath ==
At the end of the debate Oda Nobunaga came down from Azuchi Castle to Jōgon-in and summoned both the Nichiren and the Jōdo-shū supporters before him. To begin, he gave heavy praise to Gyokunen Reiyo and Teian of the Jōdo sect, in addition to giving them, as well as the prelate Shū, gifts for the trouble they had to go through due to the disturbance.

Nobunaga next had the Nichiren layman Ōwaki Densuke brought forward and reprimanded him for his inappropriate behavior. Despite being a mere salt peddler and not a holder of a province or district, Densuke had shown no favor to a prelate who had stayed at his lodgings and had allowed himself to be instigated by others to impugn his guest, causing an uproar. Nobunaga then had Densuke beheaded as punishment. Densuke's accomplice, Takebe Jōchi, who had caused the entire incident alongside Densuke, would later be caught fleeing from Nobunaga at the port of Sakai, leading to his arrest and subsequent beheading.

After this Nobunaga summoned Fuden, a highly learned and religiously unaffiliated scholar from Kyushu, and one of the supporters of the Nichiren sect in the debate. According to rumors, Fuden was extremely knowledgeable about Buddhist scriptures and had declared the Nichiren sect to be the best after studying the Eight Sects. However, he also stated that he would join any sect if Nobunaga instructed him to. Nobunaga perceived Fuden's actions as a scheme driven by greed and deception. He accused Fuden of joining the Nichiren sect for bribes, acting against his promises, and deliberately staying silent during the debate until the Nichiren sect appeared to be winning. Nobunaga concluded that Fuden's behavior was unbecoming of his age and erudition and had him decapitated as well.

Finally Nobunaga spoke to the remaining Nichiren dignitaries. He criticized the Nichiren sect for spending their time on temple beautification and boisterous harassment of other sects instead of studying, deeming it miscreant. He demanded they either convert to Jōdo-shū or document their concession and refrain from slandering other sects, believing the Nichiren establishment would later deny losing if there was not a written concession.

Fearful of a more widespread persecution, the Nichiren establishment apologized for its transgressions, acknowledged their defeat, and promised to never persecute any other sect in the future, but a large indemnity was still imposed upon it. The outcome established an enforced religious tolerance between Buddhist sects in Japan.
