= Sutemi =

- Gender: Male

Origin
- Origin: Japanese
- Meaning: Different meanings depending on the kanji used

Sutemi (written: 捨己) is a masculine Japanese given name. Notable people with the name include:

- Chinda Sutemi (珍田 捨巳; 1857–1929), Japanese diplomat
- Sutemi Horiguchi (堀口 捨己; 1895–1984), Japanese architect and historian
