= Golden Tea Room =

Japanese portable tea room

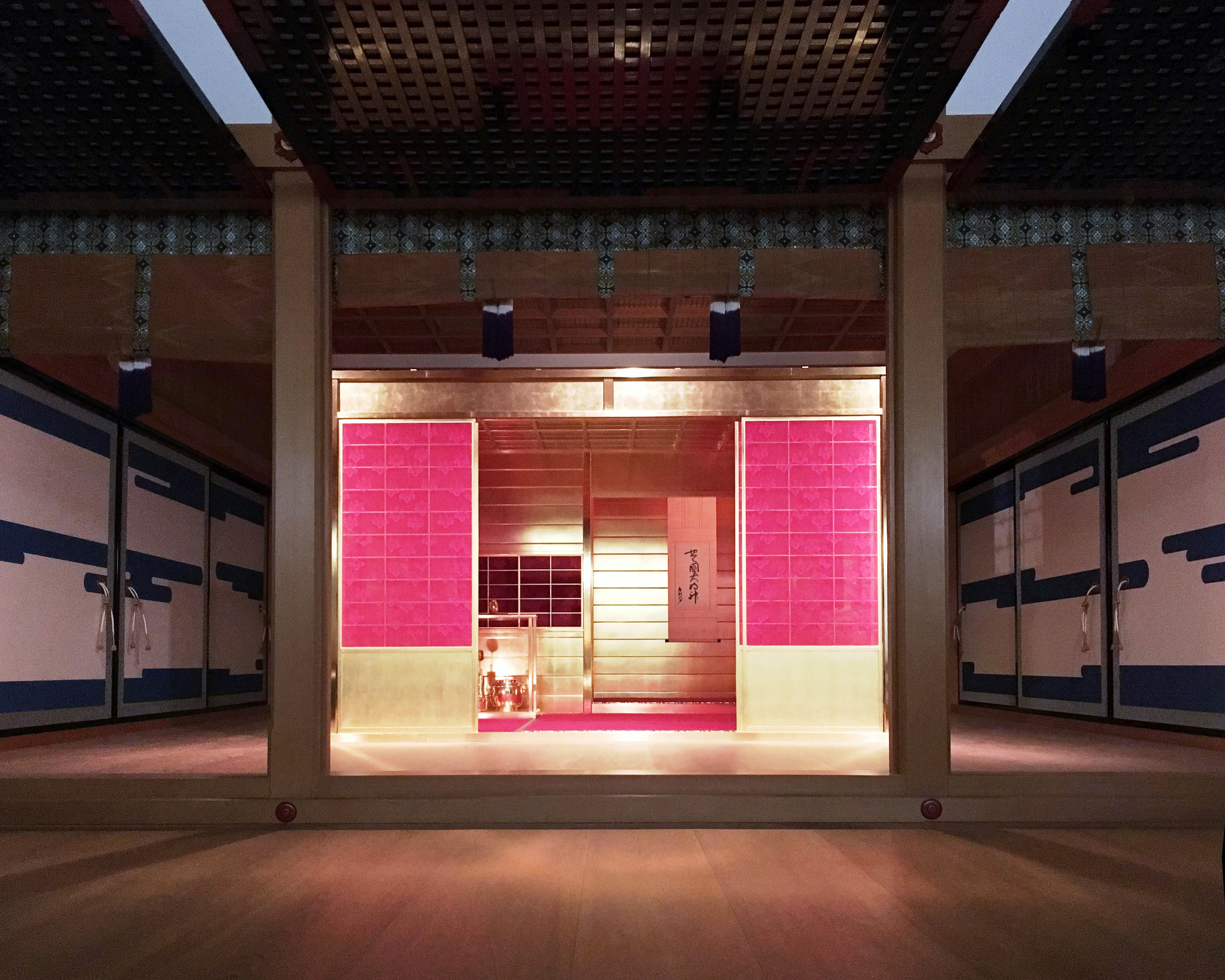
Golden Tea Room, in the MOA Museum of Art, Atami

The Golden Tea Room (黄金の茶室, Ōgon no chashitsu) was a portable gilded chashitsu (tea room) constructed during the late 16th century Azuchi–Momoyama period for the Japanese regent Lord Toyotomi Hideyoshi's tea ceremonies. The original Golden Tea Room is lost, but a number of reconstructions have been made.

== History ==
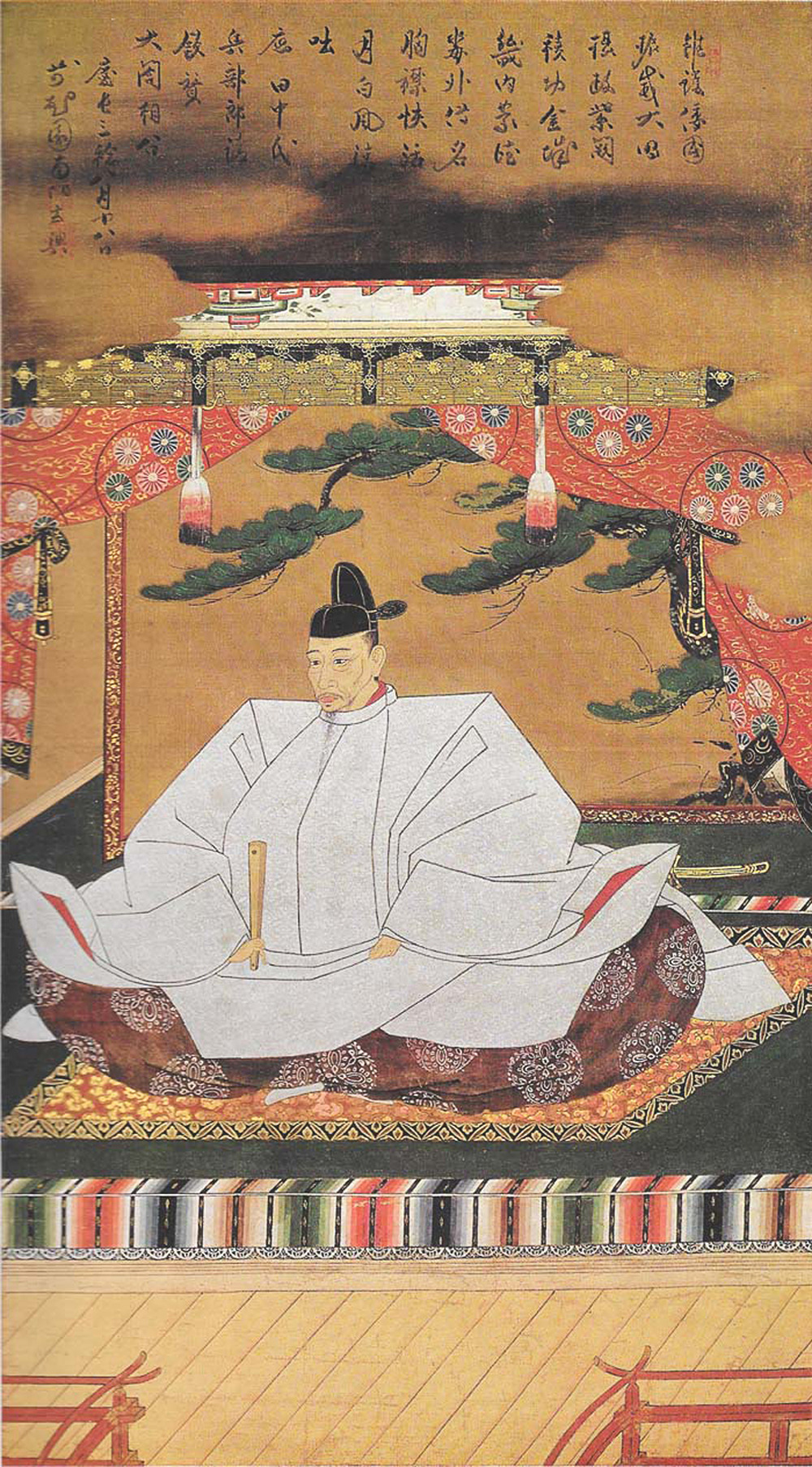
Toyotomi Hideyoshi, the patron of the room

In the 1580s, as Toyotomi Hideyoshi defeated a large number of opposing samurai clans, he also gained more control over precious metal mines. There is scant information as when precisely the tea room was built, by which artisans, and for what total cost. In 1585, the Imperial Court appointed him to the prestigious position of Imperial Regent (kampaku). The first mention of the Golden Tea Room is dated to January of the year Tenshō 14 (1586), when he had the room brought to the Kyoto Imperial Palace to host Emperor Ōgimachi. Historians typically assume that the room was completed around or shortly before that date, probably expressly for the first official visitor that Hideyoshi hosted as regent.

After this crowning inauguration, Hideyoshi would exhibit his most precious special tea tools (meibutsuki) in the room and give tours of it to his guests. Its use was again recorded for the Grand Kitano Tea Ceremony on Shíyuè 1, Tenshō 15 (November 1, 1587) at the Kitano Tenmangū shrine in Kyoto. It was transported from Osaka Castle to Hizen Nagoya Castle in the fifth month of Bunroku 1 (1592), from where Hideyoshi launched the Japanese invasions of Korea (1592–98). The Golden Tea Room travelled to wherever Hideyoshi went, and was therefore probably also used in Fushimi Castle and the Jurakudai residence before it was ultimately lost.

=== Replicas ===
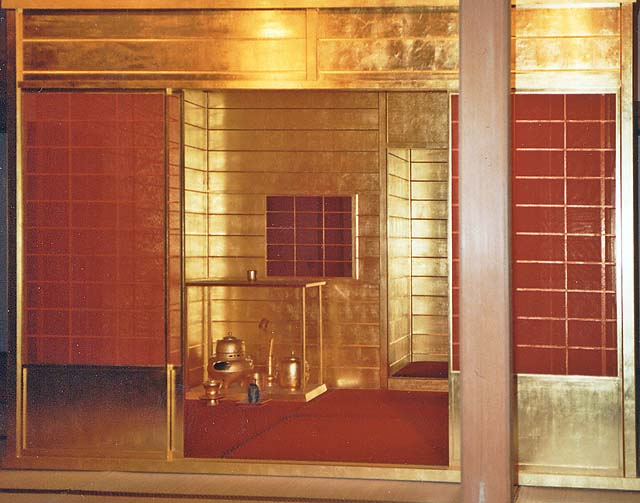
Reconstructed Golden Tea Room in Fushimi Castle

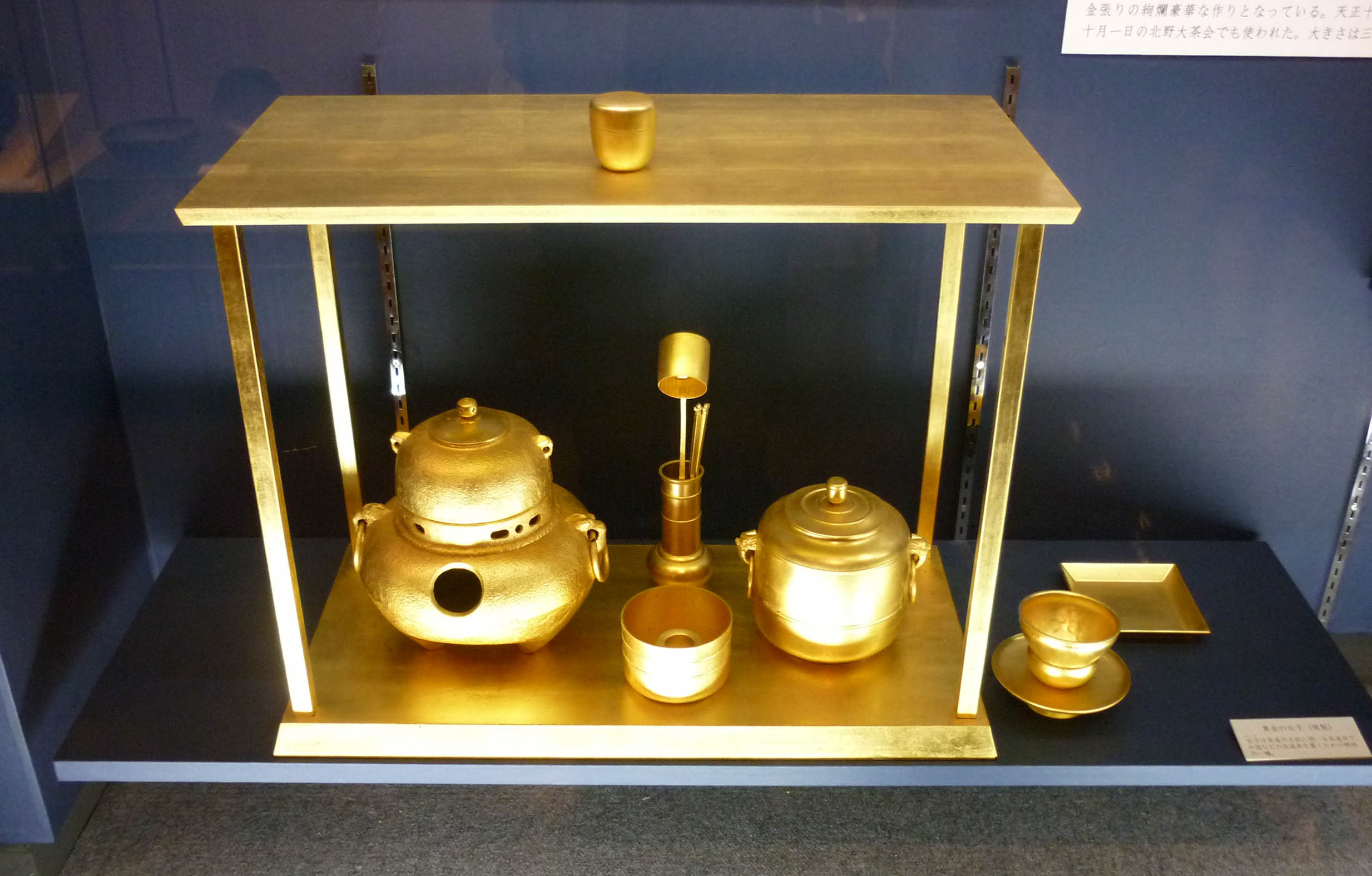
Replicated golden tea vessels of the room (Kyoto City Archaeological Museum)

A number of reconstructed versions were made, including ones in Fushimi Castle, Osaka Castle, Hakuza gold-leaf company in Kanazawa, Chōfuku-ji temple in Toyama, and the MOA Museum of Art in Shizuoka. A set of golden tea utensils are exhibited at the Kyoto City Archaeological Museum. The version in the MOA Museum was made under the architect Sutemi Horiguchi, an expert of sukiya architecture, and is considered probably the best version in terms of quality and thoroughness of research. Around 50 kilograms (110 lb) of gold were used for the utensils in this room. They are reproductions from bronze heirlooms of the Omotesenke school used at the Fushin-an chashitsu. For the sliding doors, silk fabric uses the paulownia floral patterns favoured by Hideyoshi, which were modeled after karakami printed paper from the Ko-shoin of the Katsura Imperial Villa.

Another version of the room was recreated under master goldsmith Ishikawa Kōichi III (三代目 石川光一) from Tokyo. It was reproduced following the historic records of an eyewitness, with the cooperation of the National Museum of Nature and Science, the Konishi Decorative Arts and Crafts company (which specialises in the preservation of historic shrines and temples), and the temple architect Ogura Yoshihito. The measurements of this reproduced room are height 2.5 metres (8 ft 2 in) in height and 2.7 metres (8 ft 10 in) in width, with a diameter of 2.55 metres (8 ft 4 in). 200-year old Japanese cypress wood was used, along with 15,000 sheets of 23K gold leaf, weighing a total of 26.10 kilograms (57.5 lb), which was applied by hand. The construction time was around eight months. In addition to the room, all the tea utensils (such as the kettle, stove, bowls) were created out of pure gold. It was offered in 2013 for commercial sale in an auction for a worth ranging between US$1,890,000–2,610,000.

In April 2022 the Saga Prefectural Nagoya Castle Museum installed a Golden Tea Room, recreation costs of this room were around 55 million Japanese yen.

== Description ==
Historical records by court nobles, warriors, tea ceremony masters, and Jesuit missionaries document the room's appearance, such as those by Kamiya Sōtan, Yoshida Kanemi, and Ōtomo Sōrin.

The room was made from Japanese cypress, bamboo, reeds, and silk, and could be disassembled and packed into crates for transport then transported and set-up again at different locations wherever the lord desired it. The room was probably near the size of three tatami mats, or 2.865 m (9.40 ft) × 5.73 m (18.8 ft). Its layout and appearance adhered to a standard chashitsu tea room with flat walls and rectangular pillars devoid of any carvings, with a flat or coffered ceiling, and tokonoma alcove. It would typically be assembled within a larger room in a castle or residence. The gold leaf covered every surface inside and outside of the room, including the shōji sliding doors. Silk gossamer was on the latticework of the sliding doors. The tatami mats on the floor were also covered with a crimson felt or fabric. The tea utensils were all either made out of gold or gilded, except for the whisk and the cloth.

The Golden Tea Room was constructed to impress guests with the might and power of the regent. This was in contrast to the rustic aesthetics codified under his tea master Sen no Rikyū, although it is speculated that Rikyū might have helped in the design. The room's opulence was highly unusual and may have also been against wabi-sabi norms. At the same time, the simplicity of the overall design with its clean lines could be seen as within the canon. The extent of teamaster Rikyū's involvement in the design of the room is not known, however he was in attendance on a number of occasions when tea was being served to guests in the room.

Hideyoshi's rise from a lower-class background to the most powerful person and unifier of the realm was something completely new in Japanese history. Despite the ongoing war under his rule, the country was nevertheless starting to emerge from the violent Sengoku period. As the old order broke down and a new one emerged, so did the tastes in art. Many warriors who came from provinces outside of the capital did not have deep contacts with the subdued and restrained courtly aesthetics, but searched for something that was more reflective of their character and life experiences. A shift in usage of colours, patterns, materials, and gold started already under the predecessor Oda Nobunaga, and was a hallmark of the Azuchi–Momoyama period. The shift is represented in the new architectural style of Azuchi Castle and the Jurakudai residence in the Momoyama district of Kyoto, which gave the period its name. The Golden Tea Room was a part of this new taste, but unique in the history of the way of tea.

== In popular culture ==
The room features in a scene in the 1962 film Love Under the Crucifix, directed by Kinuyo Tanaka.

The historic event of the regent presenting tea to the emperor in the room, and the ultimately conflicting relationship between Hideyoshi and his teamaster is shown in the 1989 film Rikyu, by Hiroshi Teshigahara.

Hyouge Mono is a Japanese manga written and illustrated by Yoshihiro Yamada. It was adapted into an anime series in 2011, and includes the Golden Tea Room in its story.

== See also ==
- Tai-an
- Kinkaku-ji, also known as "Golden Pavilion", in Kyoto
- Azuchi Screens
