= Isoya Yoshida =

Japanese architect

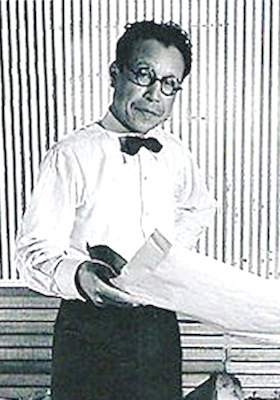
Isoya Yoshida

Isoya Yoshida (吉田 五十八, Yoshida Isoya; December 19, 1894, - March 24, 1974) was a Japanese architect. He graduated from Tokyo Art School (now Tokyo National University of Fine Arts and Music) in 1923. His style, which he called sukiya with reference to the centuries-old sukiya-zukuri tradition, combines elements of traditional Japanese architecture and modernist architecture. Among his notable projects was the fourth iteration of the Kabuki-za, which was torn down in 2010 and replaced in 2013 by a new structure designed by Kengo Kuma. Yoshida was born and died in Tokyo.
