= Kyoto City Archaeological Museum =

Mosque in Kyoto, Japan

Coordinates: 35°01′48″N 135°44′59″E

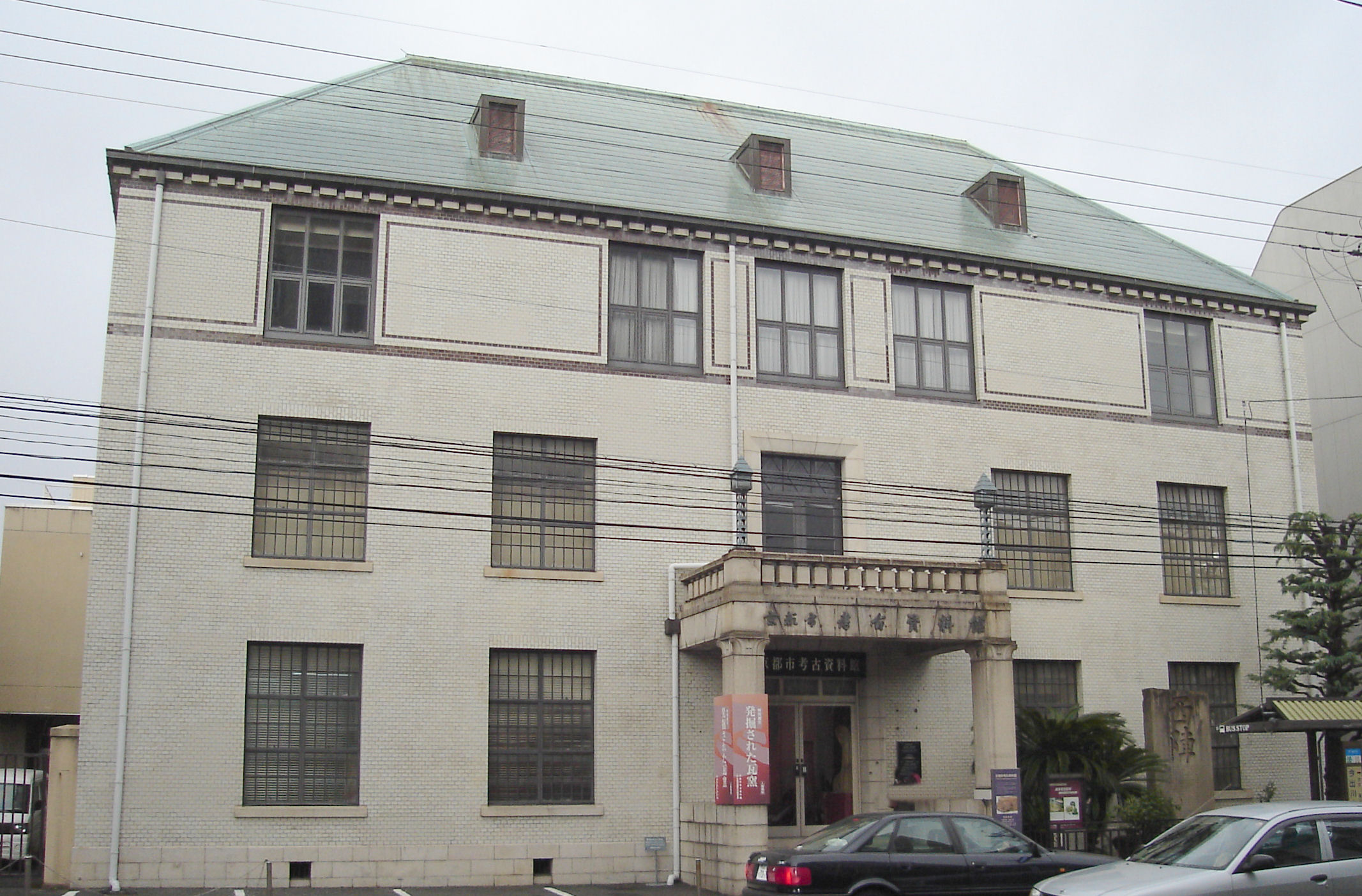
Kyoto City Archaeological Museum

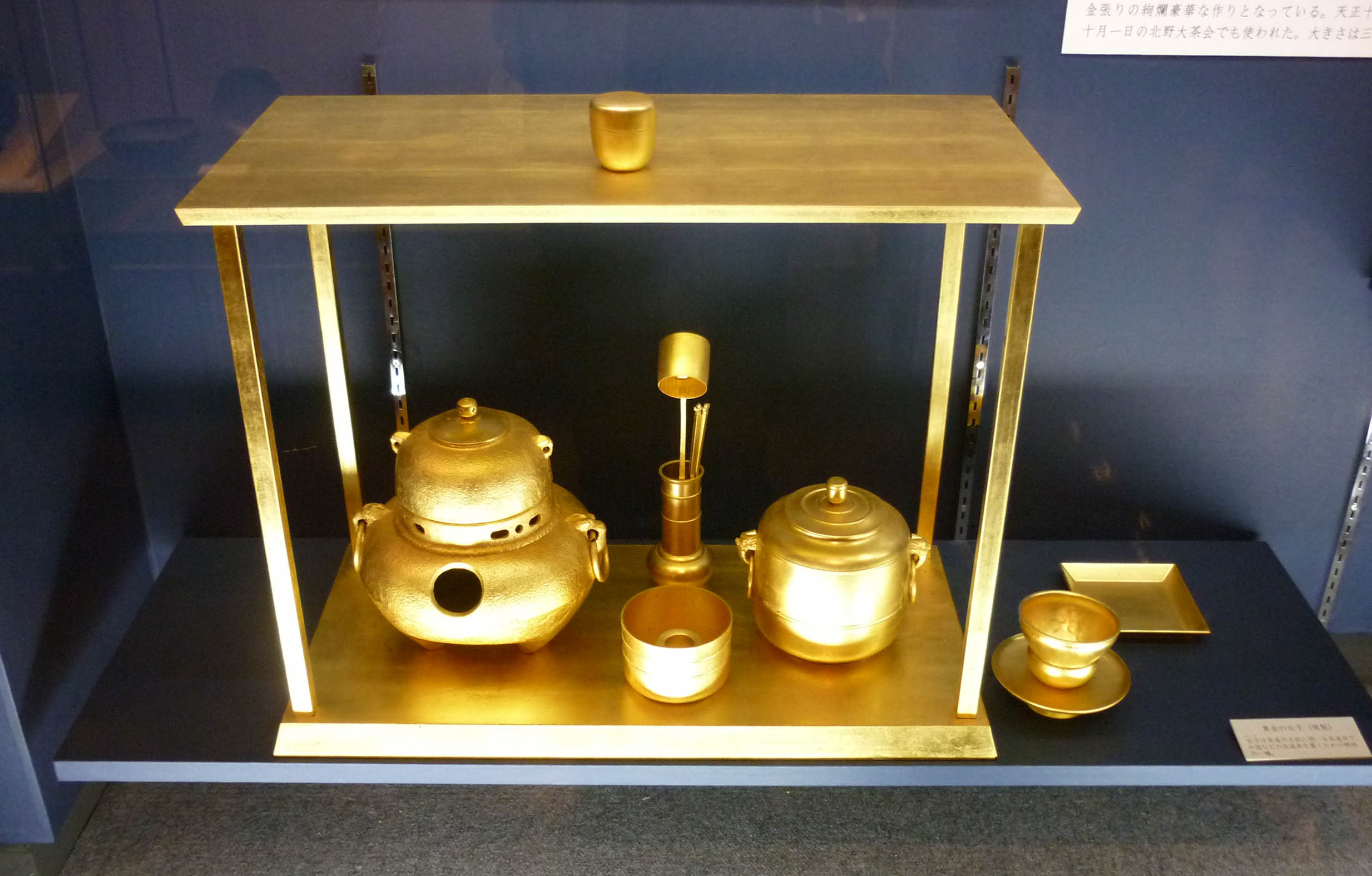
Replicated golden tea vessels of the Golden Tea Room

The Kyoto City Archaeological Museum (京都市考古資料館) is located in Kyoto and showcases the city's archaeological findings. The building was constructed in 1914.

A part of its exhibit are replicas of the golden tea utensils of the 16th century Golden Tea Room.
