= Jōgon-in =

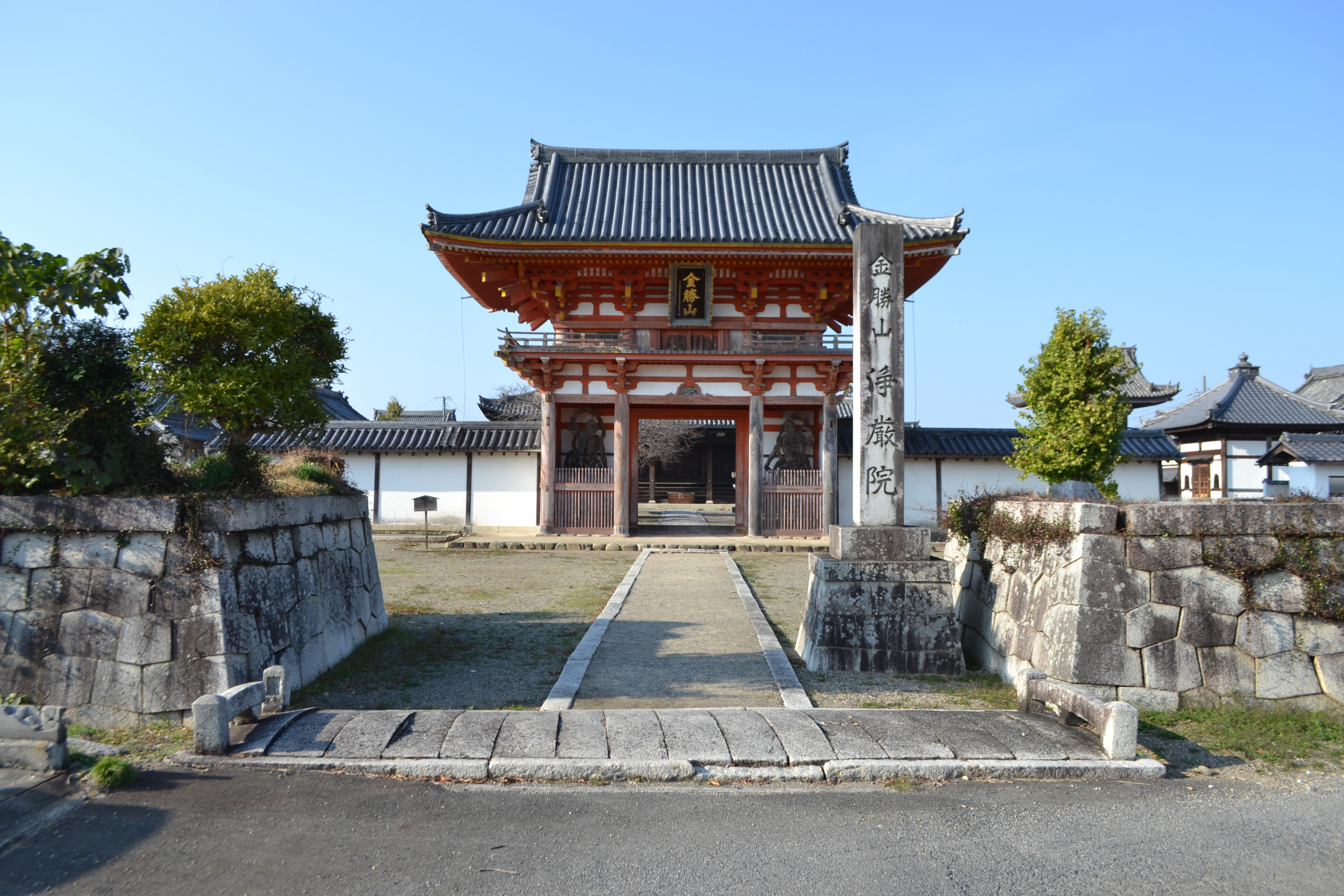
The gate of the temple.

Jōgon-in (浄厳院) is a Buddhist temple in Ōmihachiman (formerly Azuchi), Shiga, Japan belonging to the Jōdo-shū sect. The temple is dedicated to Amida Buddha.

== History ==
From 1346 to 1370, Jion-ji Temple, a small Tendai temple, stood at the current site of Jōgon-in. In 1370 the temple was destroyed in a fire during wartime, and stood in ruins for two centuries. In 1577, Oda Nobunaga invited a Jōdo-shū Buddhist priest named Meikan Jogonbo to open a new temple on the ruins of Jion-ji and named the temple Jōgon-in after its transferral to the Jōdo sect. In 1579 Jōgon-in was the site of the Azuchi religious debate between the Nichiren-shū and Jōdo-shū sects.
