= Sōken-ji =

Buddhist temple in Shiga Prefecture, Japan

- 摠見寺
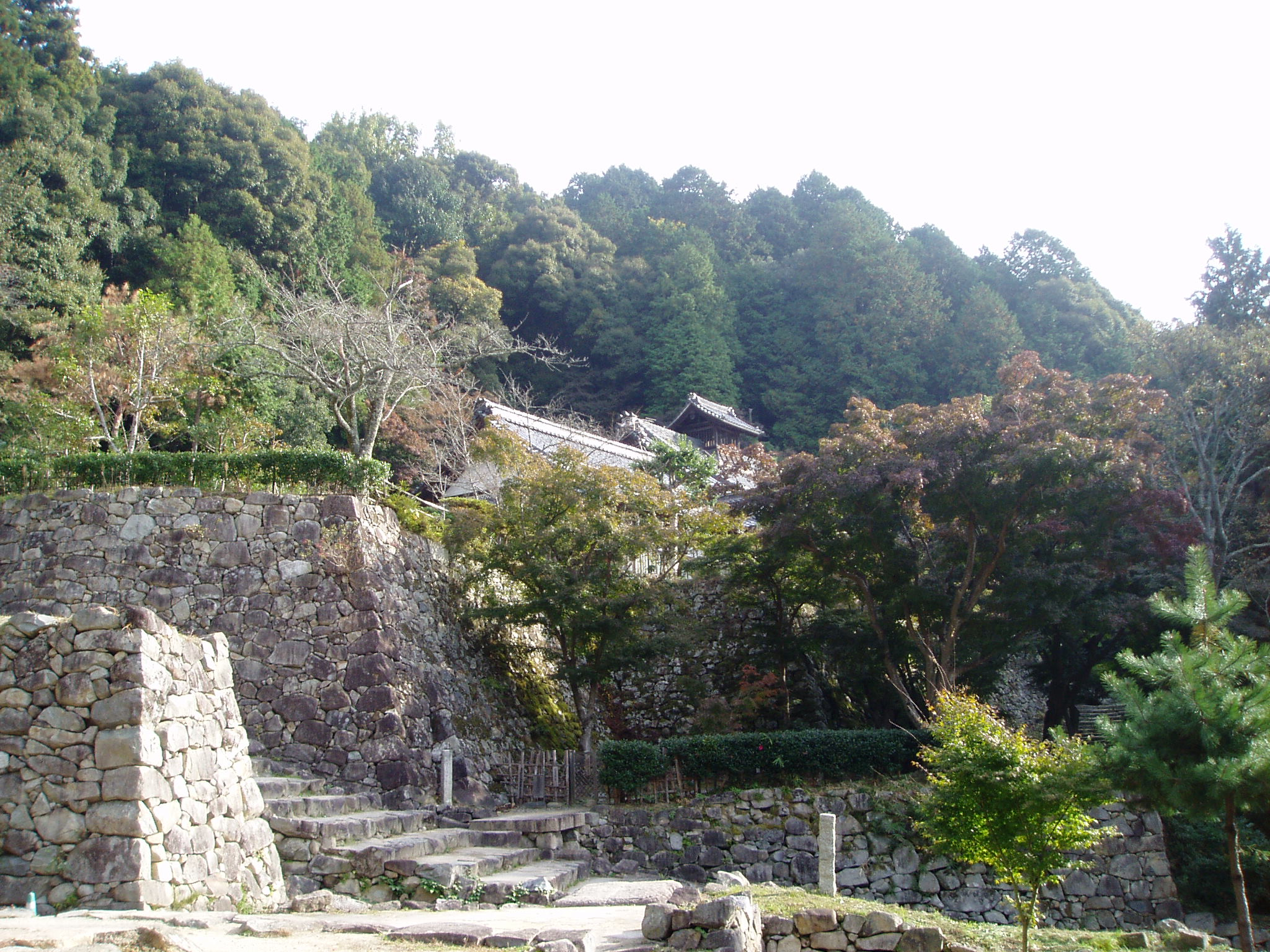
- Temporary Hondō

- Location within Shiga Prefecture Location within Japan

Religion
- Affiliation: Buddhism
- Deity: Jūichimen Kannon
- Rite: Myōshin-ji branch of Rinzai Zen
- Status: active

Location
- Location: 6367 Shimo-Toyoura, Azuchi-machi, Ōmihachiman-shi Shiga-ken
- Country: Japan
- Interactive map of Sōken-ji
- Coordinates: 35°9′15.20″N 136°8′22″E

Architecture
- Founder: Oda Nobunaga
- Completed: 1573–1591

Website
- https://www.azuchi-nobunaga.com/

Sōken-ji (摠見寺) is a Buddhist temple located in the Azuchi neighborhood of the city of Ōmihachiman in Shiga Prefecture, Japan. Its mountain name is Enkei-zan (遠景山). The temple belongs to the Myōshin-ji branch of the Rinzai school of Japanese Zen.

== History ==
Sōken-ji was erected within the grounds of Azuchi Castle by Oda Nobunaga (織田信長) in the Tenshō era (1573–1591). The head priest was Shōchū Gōka (正仲剛可), the third son of Oda Nobuyasu(織田信安), lord of Iwakura Castle in Owari province, who was from a cadet branch of the clan. Rather than build new structures, Oda Nobunaga relocated existing structures from other temples and shrines which caught his eye. Specific surviving examples include the Niōmon gate, which was originally from Kashiwagi Jinja in Kōka and the Three-story Pagoda which was originally at Chōju-ji, also in Kōka. Both structures are now designated National Important Cultural Properties

The temple survived the destruction of Azuchi Castle after the assassination of Nobunaga in 1582. During the Edo period, it had estates with a kokudaka of 227 koku, which provided it with sufficient income to grow to over 22 buildings, even without regular parishioners. It was also supported by the surviving branches of the Oda clan, especially the daimyō of Kaigara Domain in Tanba Province (30,000 koku), who used the temple as their bodaiji from 1695. Memorial services were held at the temple on the 100th, 150th, 200th and 250th anniversaries of Oda Nobunaga's death, and the successive head priests of Sōken-ji were always descendants of the Oda clan. On 16 November 1854, most of the temple, including the Main Hall were destroyed in an accidental fire. A "temporary" Main Hall was built on the site of Tokugawa Ieyasu's residence at Azuchi Castle. This building still remains in use. After the Meiji Restoration, the temple was deprived of its estates, and fell into gradual decline.

== Transportation ==
The temple is a 25-minute walk from Azuchi Station on the JR West Biwako Line.

== Gallery ==
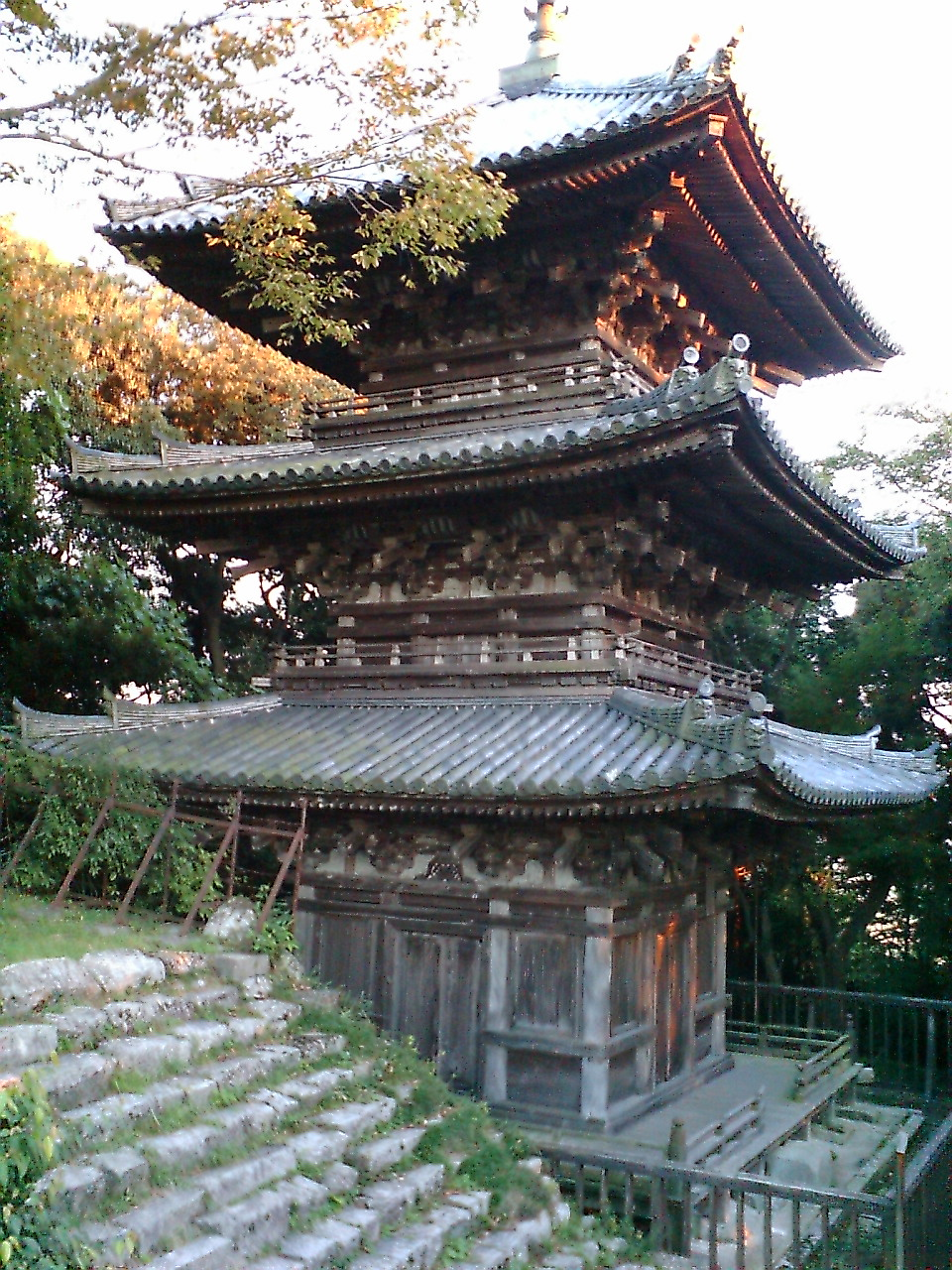
Three-story Pagoda (ICP)

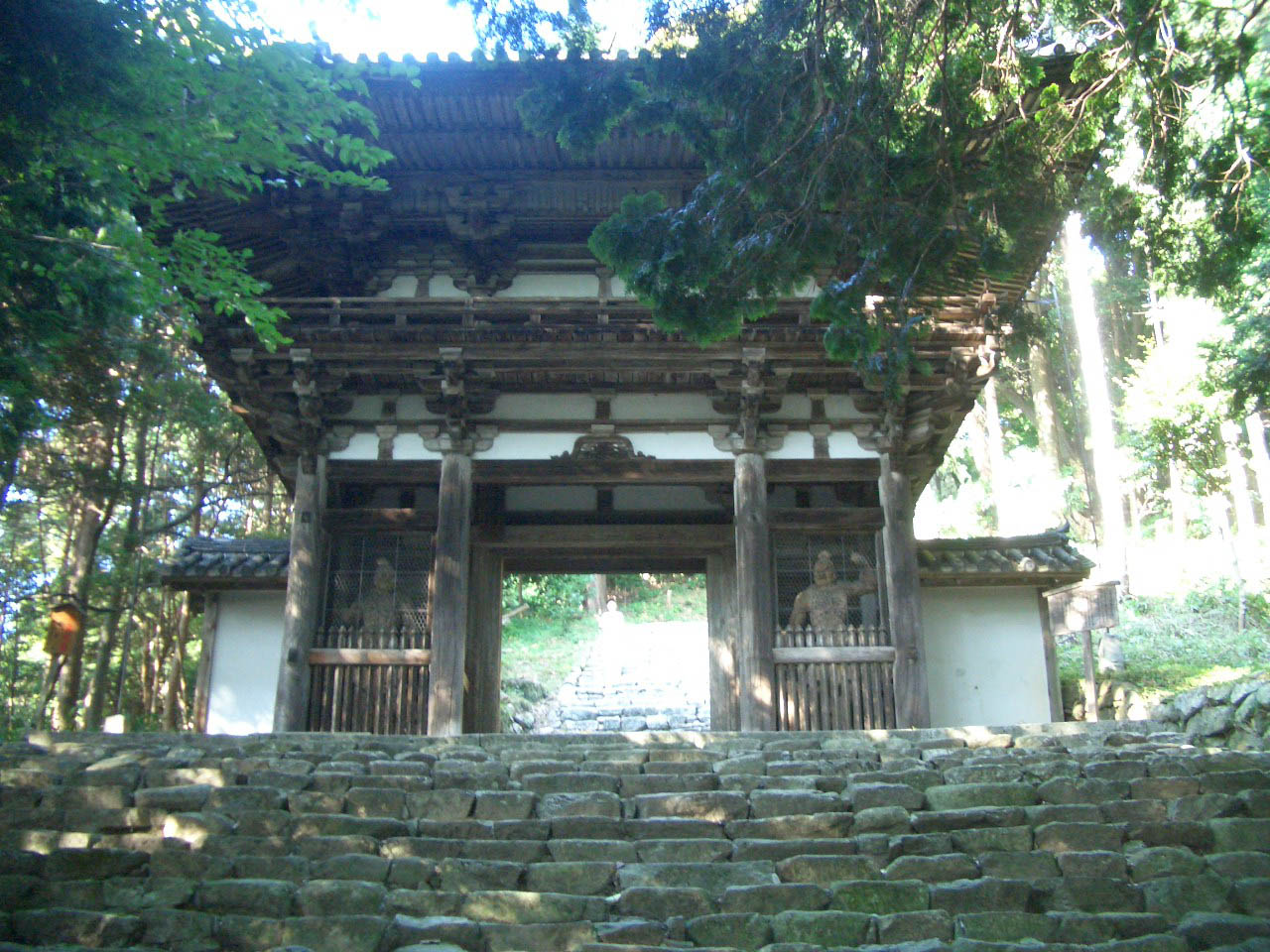
Nio-mon (ICP)

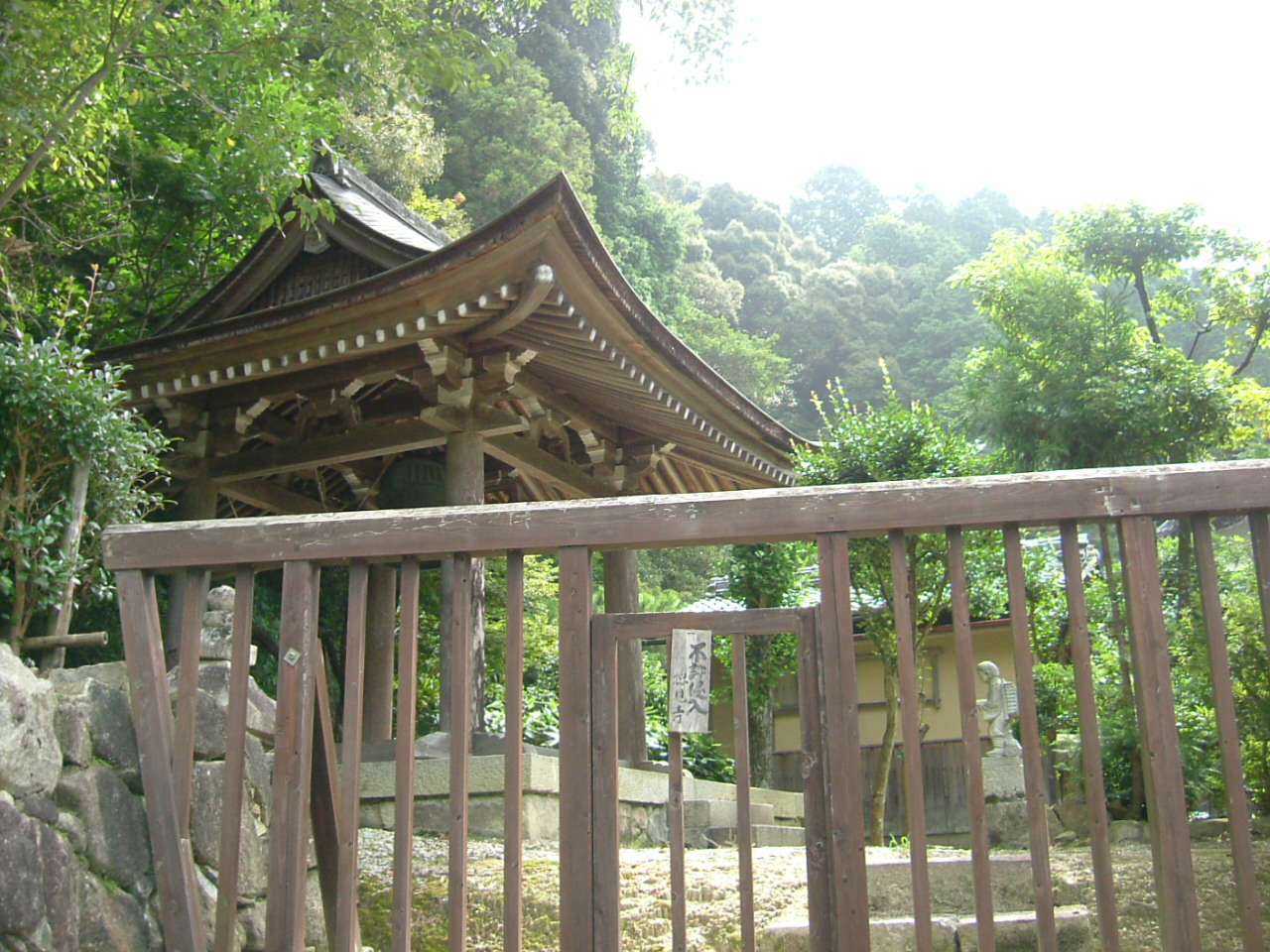
Temporary Hondō
