= Azuchi Screens =

Japanese artwork gifted to the Vatican

The Azuchi Screens (Japanese: 安土図屏風) are a pair of six-panel folding-screens, one depicting Azuchi Castle and the other its nearby town. Oda Nobunaga gifted them to Alessandro Valignano and, via the Tenshō Embassy, they were presented to Pope Gregory XIII. They were displayed in the Vatican collections, where they were admired by visitors. However, they disappeared from historical record. Their fate is unknown and they are considered to be lost. The screens were seminal works in the development of Japanese folding screens.

Variations on the name are Azuchiyama screens (安土山図屏風) or Azuchi Castle screens (安土城図屏風).

== History ==
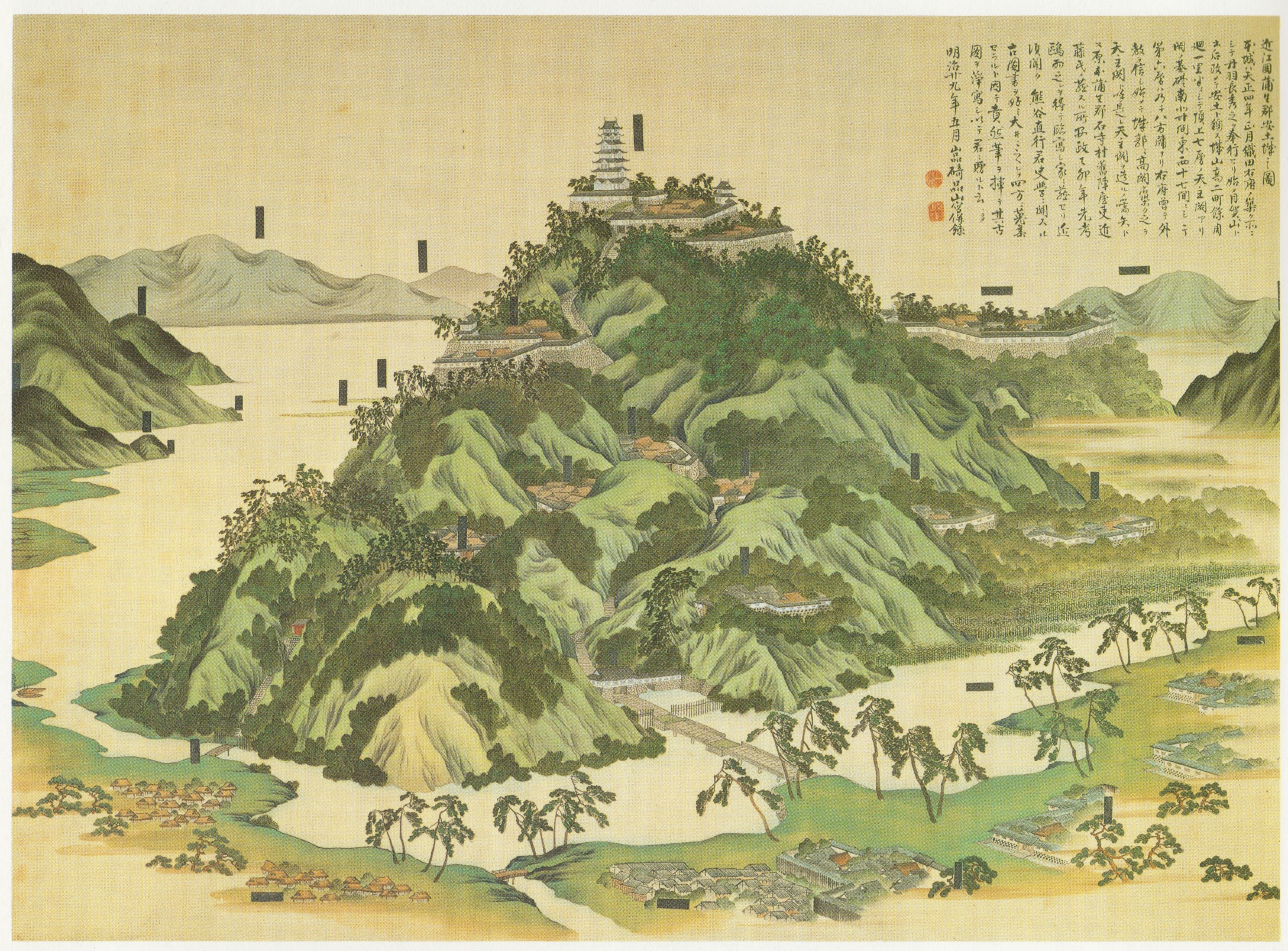
Painting of Azuchi Castle (by Iwasaki Ōu, 1855)

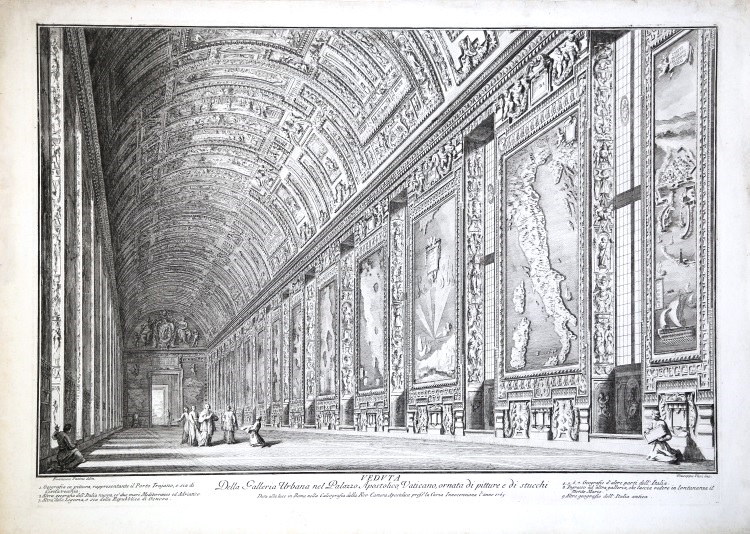
Etching showing the Gallery of Maps in the Vatican, 1765

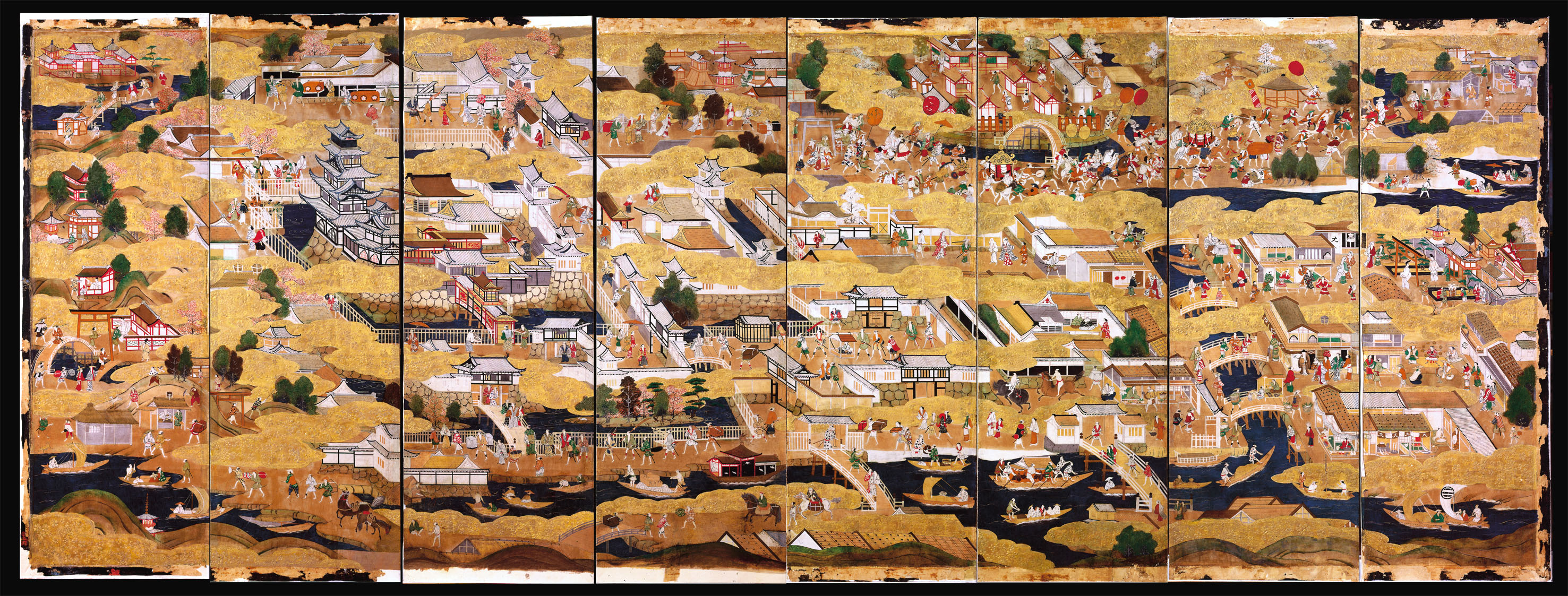
Example of a folding screen depicting Osaka castle, which was discovered at Eggenberg Palace in Graz, Austria, during a restoration between 2001 and 2004

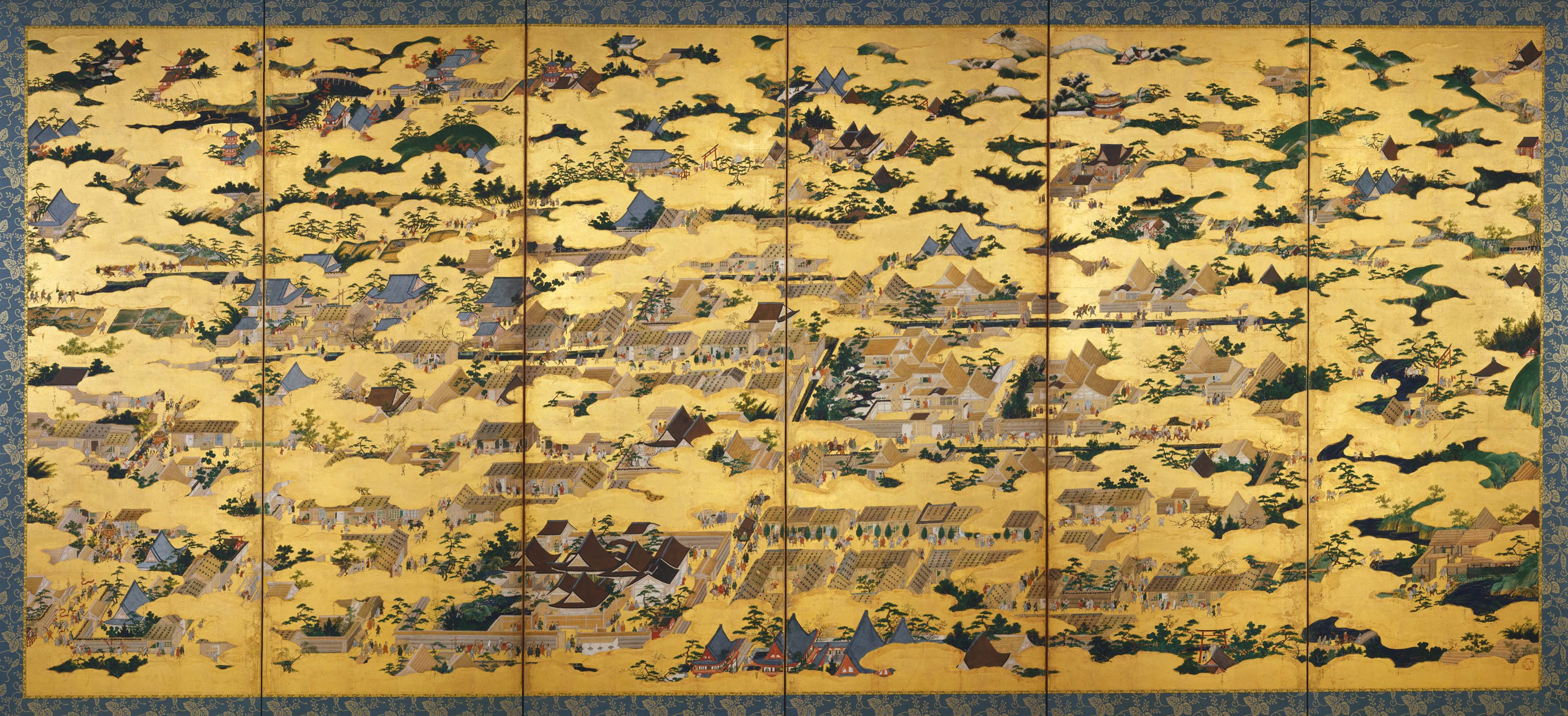
Example of a folding screen created by Kanō Eitoku around 1574, called Scenes in and around the capital (紙本金地著色洛中洛外図, shihonkinji chakushoku rakuchū rakugaizu)

The late sixteenth and early seventeenth century saw the unification of Japan through the conquests of three great military leaders: Oda Nobunaga, Toyotomi Hideyoshi, and Tokugawa Ieyasu. This era is also called the Azuchi-Momoyama period, after the sites of the great castles of Nobunaga and Hideyoshi. The period saw a rapid development in Japanese castle construction: castles on a larger grander scale boasting a large stone basis, a complex arrangement of concentric baileys, and a tall tower. Other developments occurred in the visual arts, such as the folding screens decorating the palatial residences.

In 1579, Oda Nobunaga commissioned Kanō Eitoku (1543-1590), the most famous Japanese painter of his time, to create a pair of folding screens of Azuchi castle. It was a meticulously detailed birds-eye view of the fortress and its nearby town. In 1581, the Italian Jesuit Alessandro Valignano (1539 – 1606) visited Japan, and Oda Nobunaga gifted him with the screens. Valignano conceived the idea of sending a Japanese embassy to Europe, and the screens became part of this plan. This became the so-called Tenshō embassy of 1582–1592, consisting of four young Japanese noblemen who left Japan (along with the screens in question) to visit the Pope and the kings of Europe. Over India, Portugal and Spain, they traveled to Italy. In March 1585, the embassy arrived in Rome. In the afternoon of 3 April 1585, in the Papal apartments of the Vatican, they presented the screens to Pope Gregory XIII (1502-1585). Afterwards, they were set up for display in a gallery of the Vatican, probably the Galleria delle carte geografiche ('Gallery of Maps') or the gallery of Cosmography.

In 1592, a Flemish artist from Leuven named Philips van Winghe made a few drawings copying details of Azuchi castle. This is the last historical record of the screens. They were major renovations of the gallery between 1592 and 1596, and between 1630 and 1637, but there is no record what happened to the screens.

There is a faint hope that the screens will be discovered in a forgotten corner of the Vatican. It is also possible that a Pope has re-gifted them to someone else, and that they are hidden in a repository elsewhere in Europe. In the early 2000s, during a restoration of Eggenberg Palace in Graz, Austria screens were discovered depicting Toyotomi's Osaka Castle. In the 18th century, they were repurposed to decorate a room of the palace. Something similar may have happened to the Azuchi screens. However, a scholar raised that compared to Japan the climate is comparatively dryer in Italy, which may have caused the screens to disintegrate, which is also a possibility.

The sketches by Philips van Winghe are also lost. However, the Italian Filippo Ferroverde made two woodblock print copies for Lorenzo Pignoria’s (1571-1631) addendum, Second Part of the Images of Indian Gods, in the 1624, 1626, and 1647 editions of Vincent Catari’s (circa 1531-1569) Images of the Gods and Ancients. These prints are still there and often discussed in studies on the Azuchi castle.

Most likely, the Tenshō embassy also presented folding screens to the king of Spain in the court of Madrid, but they left no trace here at all.

== Azuchi Screens Research Network ==
In 1984, the town of Azuchi conducted the first research project into the screens at the Vatican, but no information is found. Multiple investigation attempts were performed by a group of scholars and government officials between 2004 and 2016. This resulted in the 2016 creation of the Azuchi Screens Research Network, a group dedicated "to finding these priceless artworks, or in lieu of the real thing, discovering vestiges, descriptions, or other mentions of the screens that might offer new insights into the screens' composition, character, quality, meanings, or fate." The network sponsors two part-time researchers in Rome.

== See also ==
- Golden Tea Room

== Literature ==
- Cooper, Michael (2005). "Appendix 3 Azuchi Screens and Braun's Cities". The Japanese Mission to Europe, 1582-1590 The Journey of Four Samurai Boys through Portugal, Spain and Italy. Brill. pp. 203–211. ISBN 978-1901903386.
- McKelway, Matthew (2006). "The Azuchi Screens and Images of Castles". Capitalscapes Folding Screens and Political Imagination in Late Medieval Kyoto. University of Hawaii Press. p. 296. ISBN 978-0824861773.
- Midori Wakakuwa; Paola Cavaliere; Kiyono Shimbo (2007). Research report Jan.11 - Feb.10 2007 (PDF) (Report) (in Japanese). pp. 40 pages.
- Rees, Joachim & Usanov-Geissler (2015). "Harbouring Expectations The Littoral as Contact Zone in the Visual Arts of Japan and the Netherlands around 1600". In Karin Gludovatz/Juliane Noth/Joachim Rees (ed.). The Itineraries of Art. Topographies of Artistic Mobility in Europe and Asia (PDF). Paderborn: Wilhelm Fink. pp. 203–233. ISBN 978-3-7705-5795-0.
- Raneri, Giovanni (2016). Folding Screens, Cartography, and the Jesuit Mission in Japan, 1580-161 (PDF) (Thesis). Manchester University.
- Erdmann, Mark Karl (2016). Azuchi Castle: Architectural Innovation and Political Legitimacy in Sixteenth-Century Japan (Thesis). Harvard University.
- De Lange, William (2021). An Encyclopedia of Japanese Castles. Groningen: Toyo Press. pp. 600 pages. ISBN 978-9492722300.
- Erdmann, Mark K.; Roux, Elianne (2024). "Recent Research on the Azuchi Screens" (PDF). Journal of Asian Humanities at Kyushu University. 9 (Spring 2024): 1–23.
- Erdmann, Mark K. (2026). "Nebuchadnezzar's Draw Revisiting Philips Van Winghe's Sketches of the Azuchi Screens in Lorenzo Pignoria's "Le imagini de gli dei de gli antichi"". Ars Orientalis. 55: 24–56.
