= Sukiya-zukuri =

Type of Japanese residential architectural style

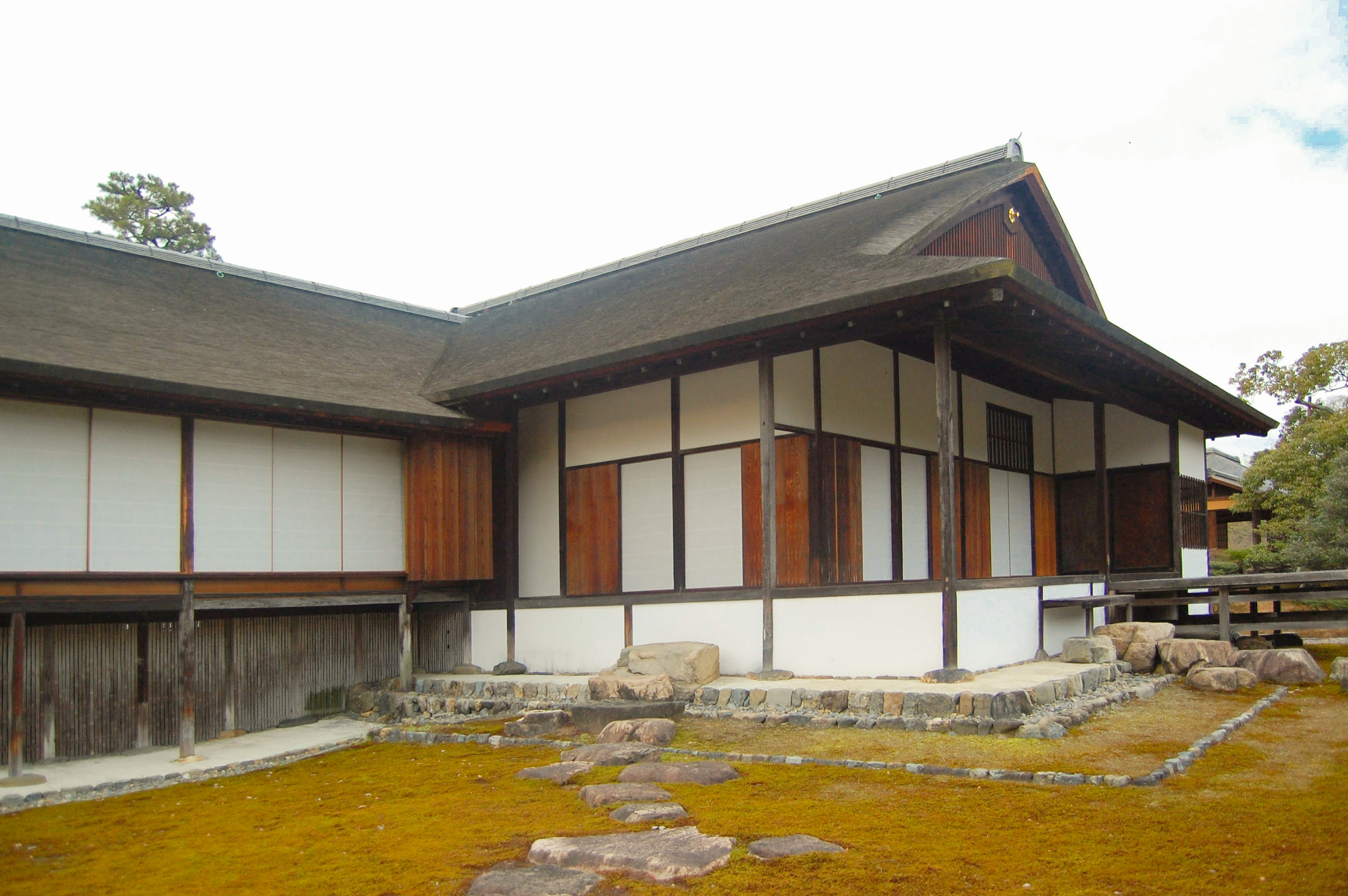
Katsura Imperial Villa, Kyoto, an early example of sukiya style. Note that the right-hand building is older than the left-hand one, and more similar to the older shoin style.

Sukiya-zukuri (数寄屋造り) is one type of Japanese residential architectural style. Suki (Ateji: 数寄 or 数奇) means refined, well cultivated taste and delight in elegant pursuits, and refers to enjoyment of the exquisitely performed tea ceremony.

The word originally meant a small structure for the Japanese tea ceremony (known as a chashitsu) and was associated with ikebana and other Japanese traditional arts. It has come to indicate a style of designing public facilities and private homes based on tea house aesthetics.

Historically and by tradition, sukiya-zukuri is characterised by a use of natural materials, especially wood. In contemporary architecture, its formal and spatial concepts are kept alive in modern materials such as steel, glass and concrete.

== Origins ==
In 1587, Toyotomi Hideyoshi (1536–1598) employed the tea master Sen no Rikyū as his advisor on aesthetic matters. In the compound of Hideyoshi's imposing Jurakudai castle in Kyoto Rikyū designed an eighteen mat building known as the Coloured Shoin which was thought to be the first example of sukiya-zukuri architecture.

The style developed during the rest of the Azuchi-Momoyama period (1568–1600) and was characterised by small rooms of usually four and a half tatami, or even less, that had a tokonoma and shelves. These buildings were normally entered through a garden often by means of an indirect curved or diagonal path that would not allow an instant view of the teahouse.

Sukiya-zukuri architecture incorporates tea house aesthetics and encompasses all sorts of building types including private dwellings, villas, restaurants and inns. One of the best known examples is the Katsura Detached Palace in Kyoto. In the Edo period (1600–1868) sukiya-zukuri became popular among townspeople, and the majority of houses came to be built in this style.

== Comparison with similar styles ==
In the Azuchi-Momoyama period not only sukiya style but the contrasting shoin-zukuri (書院造) of residences of the warrior class developed. While sukiya was a small space, simple and austere, shoin-zukuri style was that of large, magnificent reception areas, the setting for the pomp and ceremony of the feudal lords. As an example, in a shoin, the flower arrangement in the tokonoma is indicative of the relative wealth of the host, the guest however sits with their back to it as it is not meant for their enjoyment. Whereas, in a tearoom, the guest sits facing the tokonoma to enjoy its beauty.

A comparison with shoin-zukuri makes clear the defining stylistic features of sukiya-zukuri. The "frieze rails" called nageshi connect grooved, square columns in shoin-zukuri, the transom is often elaborately carved, the ceiling is coffered or railed with a hexagonal rail and the wall surfaces are finished and often decorated with murals. The toko alcove, tana shelves and shoin built-in desk are arranged according to a fixed formula.

In contrast, sukiya-zukuri often uses unsquared columns, even simple polished tree trunks, or wood with the bark in place for the nakabashira central column. The walls are simply finished with a natural earthen plaster, and any carving in the ranma transom is kept simple. The ceiling of boards is railed with flat, rectangular boards. Although there is a tokonoma alcove and tana shelves and maybe also shoin in the main room, their arrangement and treatment are free. The beauty of sukiya-zukuri comes from the delicate sensibility of the slender wood elements and other natural materials used, and the simplicity of ornamentation, if any.

== Development ==
In the Coloured Shoin teahouse Sen no Rikyū stained the timbers with a mixture of Bengal red dye and black dye to make them look sooty and old. In contrast, his student's Oribe and Enshu preferred brighter colours and natural finishes. It is thought that this change coincided with the development of the regular wood plane that allowed a more consistent finish to wood and a better appreciation of the natural qualities of unfinished wood. It is a trait that has characterised the sukiya style since.

After the Meiji Restoration in 1867 the samurai class and thus the shoin-style lost its reason for being whereas the sukiya style continued to develop and was reassessed for modernist architecture.

The sukiya style requires a subtle harmony between the principles required in its construction, these include the relationship between the client, the architect and the carpenter. Both the architect and the carpenter should have a profound understanding of the materials employed. There is an example of a carpenter asked to build a sukiya style house declining because he lost his tools in World War Two and he felt that he would not be in a position to work satisfactorily.

Writing in 1934 the architect Isoya Yoshida encouraged architects to design in the sukiya-style using modern materials. He said that it was important to display the natural characteristics of the wood although it would be a mistake to use anything that might catch the eye as this was not in the spirit of the style.

Though originally conceived in natural materials, primarily wood, sukiya style adapted itself to modern materials, namely concrete and steel, as builders and architects seek to incorporate sukiya interior design elements into modern buildings in an urban environment. This is not seen as a dilution of the design idiom—as architectural historian Teiji Itoh points out, "in its formative years, the sukiya tradition was concerned primarily with interior design. ... Sukiya style is well suited to [modern buildings] because it is concerned primarily with conforming a certain decor to an already established spatial entity." That said, in most cases, sukiya design in an urban setting is far from the original spirit of a "mountain retreat in the city" as it was conceived in the 16th century Japan of Sen no Rikyū.

=== Shutter systems ===
The transition between the Shoin and Sukiya styles occurred during the early 1600s, as a new structure for storm shutters was devised. By stacking the opaque wooden sliding doors in a box called a to-bukuro, instead of simply overlapping them, the amount of light in the interior doubled, and unbroken views of the garden could be obtained. The lede picture of the transitional Katsura Imperial Villa shows both systems.

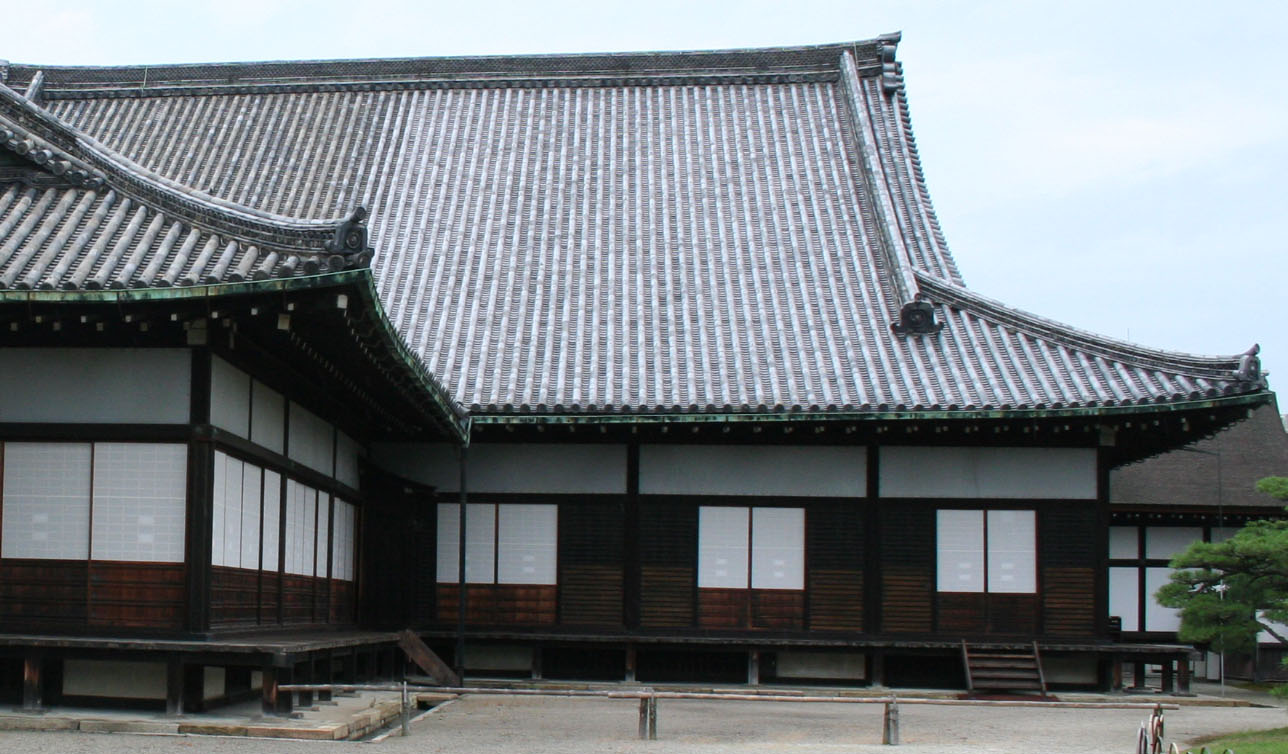
On the right, three grooves, three panels. The maira-do are open, and the single shōji panel closed; half of the area is still filled with the maira-do. The building to the left is newer; its outer groove runs outside the pillars. The shutters are packed away in the to-bukuro in the corner, and the shōji in the inner two grooves run uninterrupted.

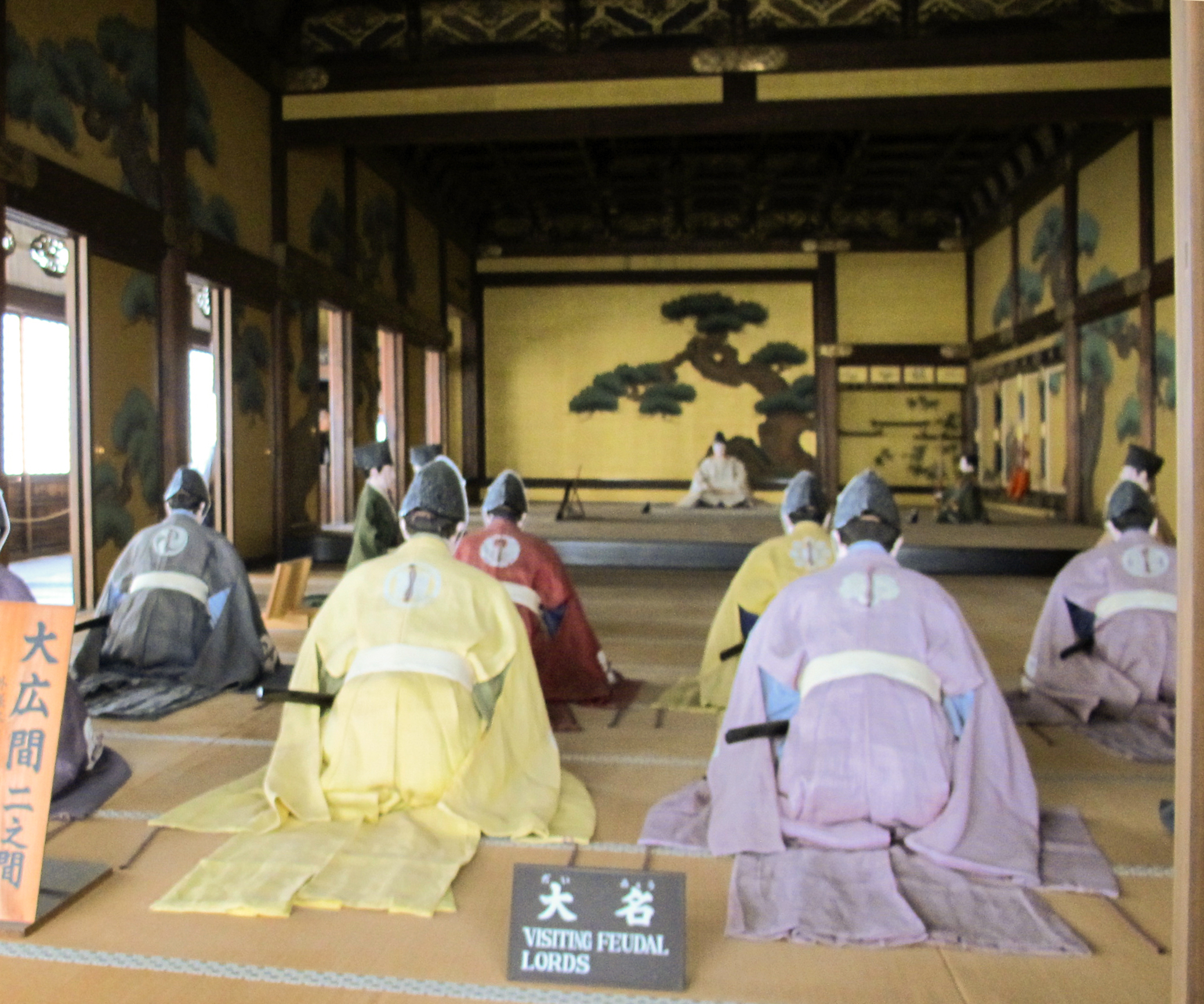
From the inside, light levels are lower. The reflective gold paint used extensively in Shoin style buildings helps compensate.

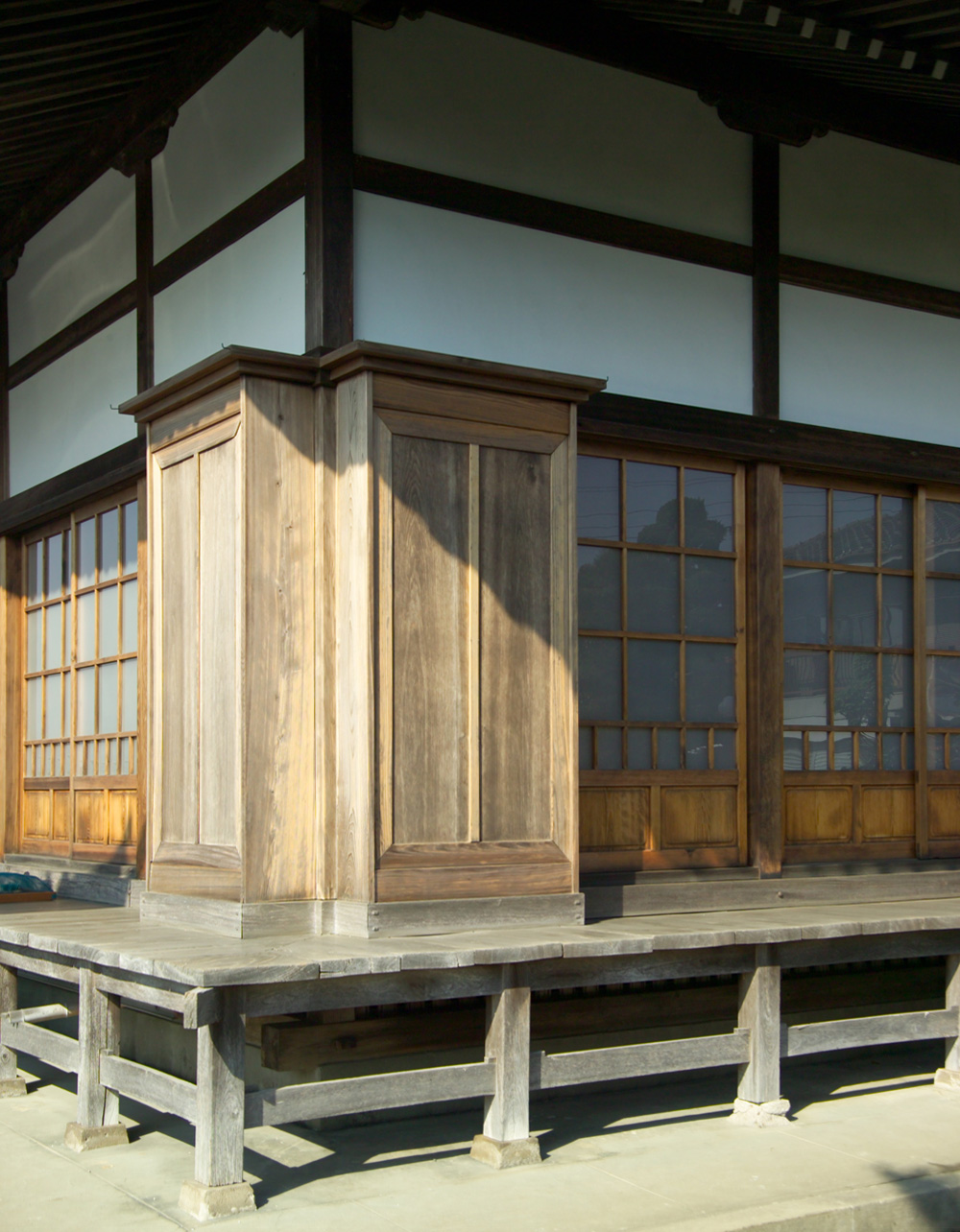
The corner of this temple has two to-bukuro cupboards, which the doors can slide into without having to be lifted and carried away.

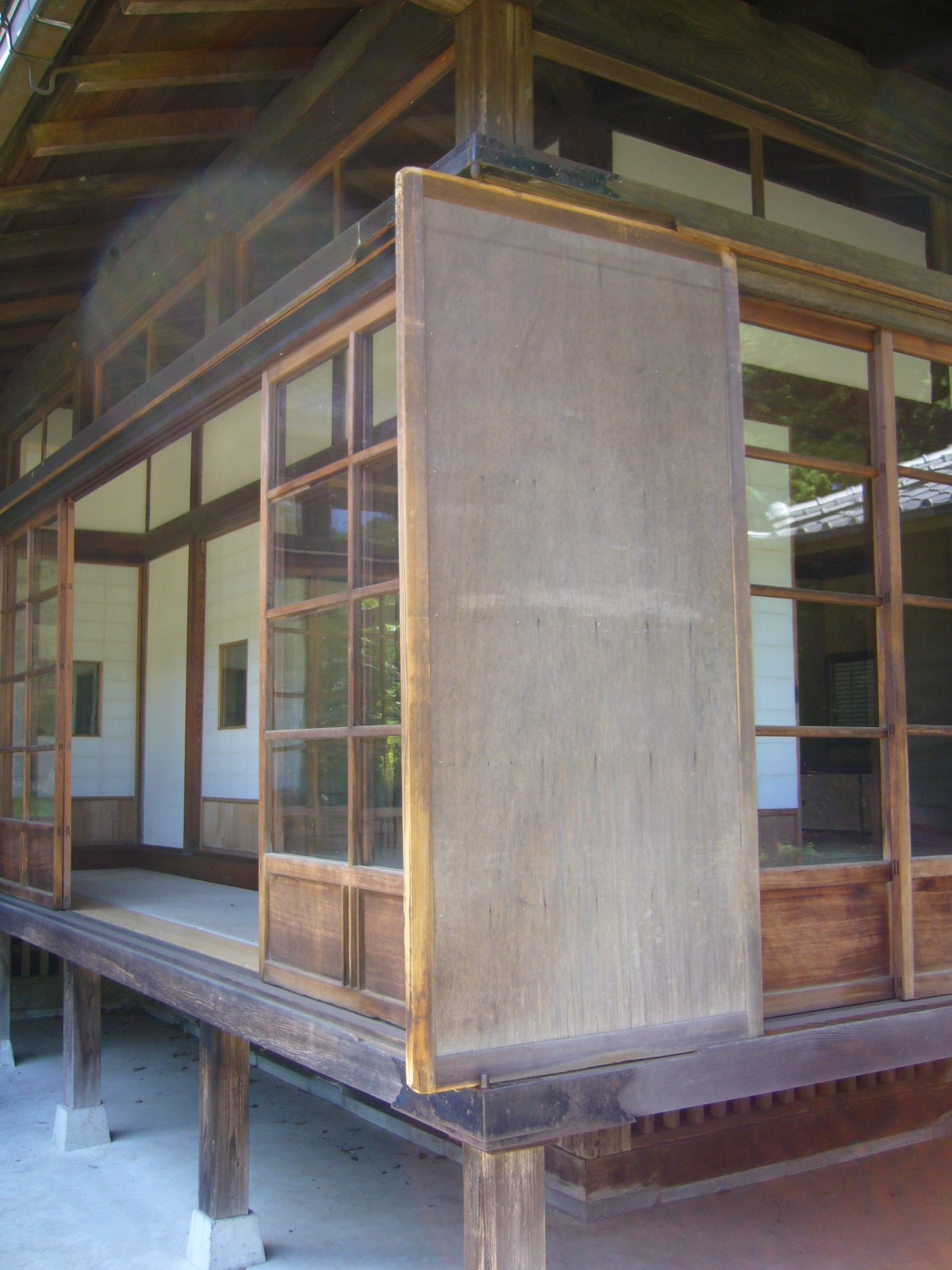
Ama-do rotator; outer ama-do groove cut away for half an ama-do width on each side. Glass doors and shōji get two grooves each.

Plan view of the mairado and amado shutter systems, showing rotator and to-bukuro. The black squares are pillars; shōji in white, rain shutters in black, grooves in grey.

Section through a Sukiya-style middle-class home

In the first half of the 1600s, at the beginning of the Edo period, the outermost groove was moved outside the line of pillars. The wooden shutters placed in this groove interlocked edge-to-edge, and were called ama-do (雨戸, 'rain-door'): they were storm shutters, used only at night and in poor weather. To open the building in the morning, each ama-do would be slid along to the end of groove, where they were stacked in a box called a to-bukuro (戸袋, とぶくろ: literally, "door-container"). The to-bukuro might be designed to swing out of the way. The inner two grooves remained as they were, but both could now be filled with shōji, doubling the number of shōji in a building. Lightweight shōji could be lifted out and carried away easily. This new structure allowed the entire side of the building to be opened, giving either twice as much light, from an uninterrupted wall of shoji, or an unobstructed view of the garden; gardens changed accordingly. Run-around engawa porches meant that to-bukuro were initially located at the corners, but amado-rotator systems (amado-mawashi) were devised to eliminate this need (see images, and external movie). Amado were rotated at corners around a fixed vertical bar called a tomawashi-bou (later reduced to a pair of pegs by removing the middle section).

By the mid-1600s, single-track ama-do had spread, and the ama-do might be placed on the outside of the engawa. Some further architectural changes were made under the influence of the change in shuttering. Shuttering was part of a combination of architectural changes marked the end of the shoin style, and the beginning of the sukiya style.

Amado also served to secure buildings, and might have nejishimari (screw-in lock on the edges). They might also have musōmado, vents which shuttered with sliding vertical slats, an allowed some light and air in when the shutters were closed. Later, garasu-do, glass sliding doors, were added between the ama-do and shoji.

== Influence ==
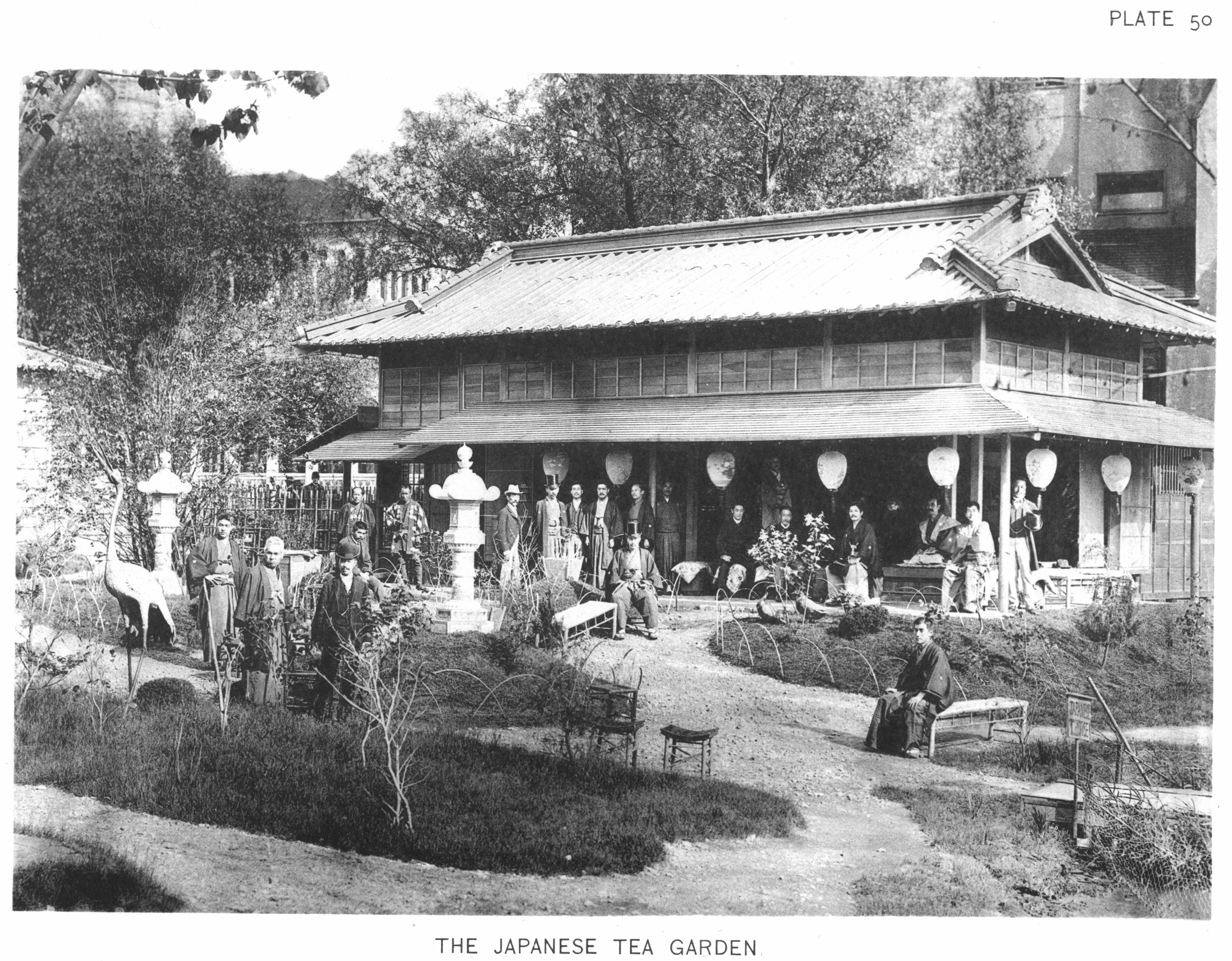
Nippon Tea House at the World's Columbian Exposition in 1893

During the World's Columbian Exposition in Chicago in 1893, a structure called the "Nippon Tea House" was built near the North pond that was designed in a loose version of the sukiya-style. Harper's Weekly, a national magazine, ran an article in March 1893 showing the construction of the Japanese contributions to the exhibition. The Chicago-based magazine Inland Architect also devoted two articles to it in the winter of 1892/3 so it is likely that local architects were familiar with the work. The historian Dmitri Tselos first identified the Nippon Tea House as a possible influence on Frank Lloyd Wright, suggesting that the low-pitched double roof forms of the Prairie Houses as having similar forms as the teahouse roof.

In 1934 in his Okada residence, the architect Sutemi Horiguchi blended elements of the sukiya-style (influenced from the Katsura Detached Palace) in the garden to help fuse western and oriental aspects of the plan.

In 1954 Walter Gropius, founder of the Bauhaus visited Katsura Detached Palace and was so struck by it that in 1960 he co-authored Katsura: Tradition and Creation Japanese Architecture with Kenzo Tange.

Most characteristic of the spirit of the conception is the path to the entrance gate of the villa. It conforms to the favorite Zen approach, which is rarely direct, axial, and symmetrical. There is a decided distaste for the imposing straight avenue; instead, there is a preference for the intimate and casual but carefully planned approach which supplies surprises at every turn and leads up to the main objective in a human, natural, unimposing manner.

— Gropius, W (1968) Apollo in Democracy – The Cultural Obligation of the Architect, McGraw-Hill Book Company, p 126
