= Sutemi Horiguchi =

Sutemi HORIGUCHI
- Born: January 6, 1895
- Died: August 18, 1984 (aged 89)
- Other name: 堀口 捨己
- Occupations: Architect, Historian (architecture)

Sutemi Horiguchi (堀口 捨己, Horiguchi Sutemi; 1895–1984) was an architect and a historian of Japanese architecture, and an expert of sukiya-zukuri architecture. In addition to designing modern buildings, he designed buildings in sukiya-zukuri, and buildings that fused both modern architectural and traditional Japanese architectural motifs.

== Biography ==
=== Early life ===
Horiguchi was born in Gifu Prefecture in 1895. During his teenage years, he explored Western-style painting (yoga) of the Meiji period, working in a styles similar to Cézanne or Fauvism. He was also an accomplished waka poet, and had several of his waka published in the prominent art journal ARS. He graduated from high school in 1917 and moved to Tokyo, where he enrolled in the architecture department of the Tokyo Imperial University (today University of Tokyo). After graduating in 1920, he pursued graduate work in the same department.

=== Early career ===
==== Bunriha ====
In February 1920, Horiguchi and fellow Tokyo Imperial University architecture students Yamada Mamoru, Ishimoto Kikuji, Morita Keiichi, Yada Shigeru, and Takizawa Mayumi founded the first modern architectural group in Japan: the Bunriha Kenchikukai (Japanese Secessionist Architectural Association). The group remained active from 1920-1928. In their emotional manifesto, they proclaimed their desire to break free from the artless, historicist Western architecture being practiced in early 20th century Japan. To do so, they imagined a new architecture that functioned as a dialectic between the past and the future, and Western and Eastern architecture. Group member's graduation thesis designs expressed some of these beliefs.

Bunriha 分離派 is a translation of "secessionist school" or "secessionist movement." The selection of this name signaled the desire to connect themselves to the Vienna Secession, something they had heard about through the lectures of their professor Ito Chuta. The group elected not to use the English name, however, in order to maintain and assert its independent identity as a Japanese architecture movement.

Many of the group's early designs remained unbuilt, but the creative ideals of the group are visible in several independently completed structures: Horiguchi's Peace Exhibition pavilions and tower (1922), arched concrete bridges by Yamada and Yamaguchi Bunzo (including Yamaguchi's Hijiri Bridge in Ochanomizu, constructed in 1930), Ishimoto's Asahi Newspaper building (1929) and his Shirokiya Department Store (1931).

==== Trip to Europe (1923) ====
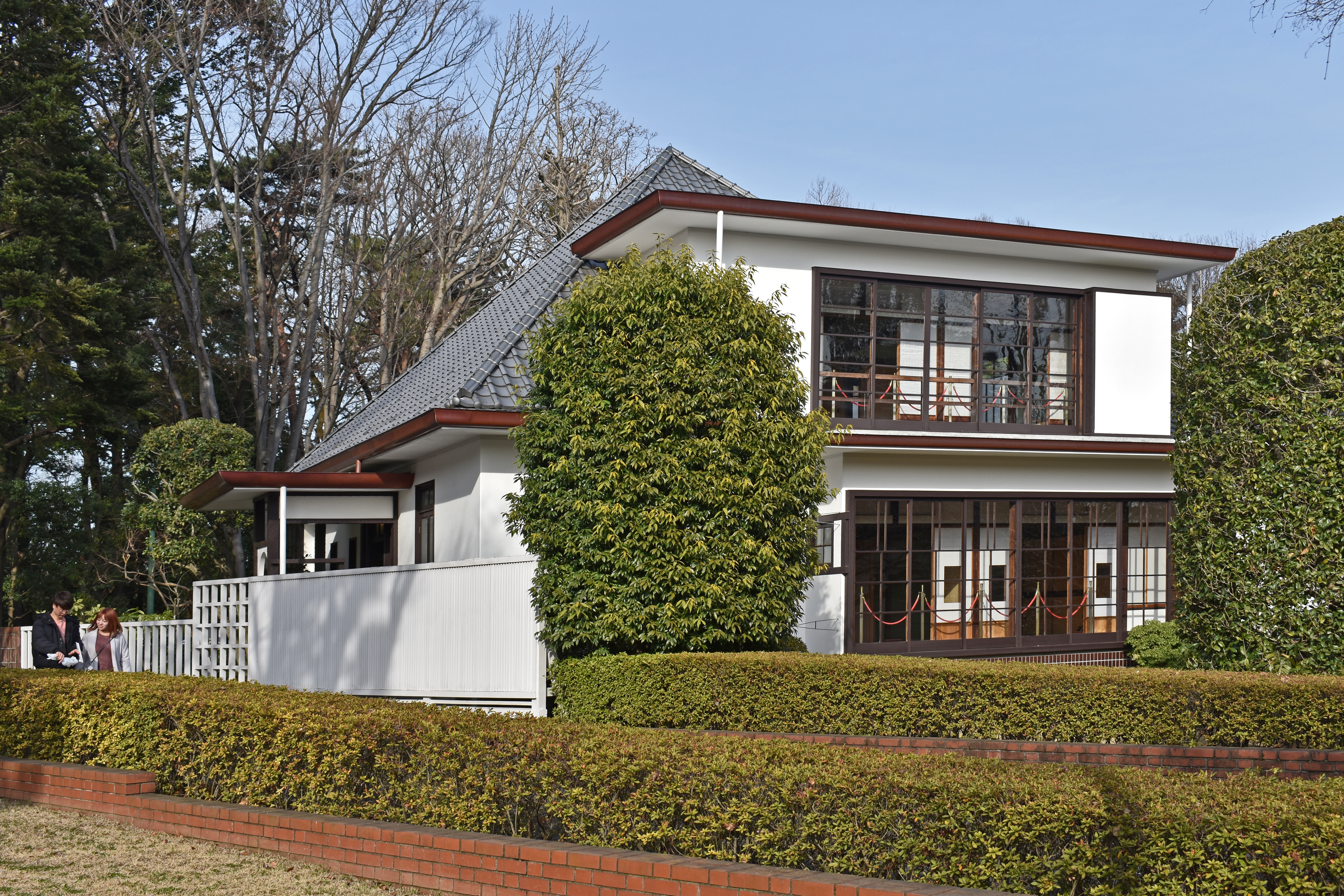
House of Koide (1925), currently at Edo-Tokyo Open Air Architectural Museum

Horiguchi traveled to Europe in 1923 for 6 months, where he was able to study monuments of architecture in person that he had previously learned about in school. He traveled to Marseilles, Lyon, Paris, Brussels, Vienna, Berlin, Darmstadt, Magedeburg, Weimar, Amsterdam, London, and Athens. His main focus was to see the work of the Vienna Secessionists. His experience viewing Josef Hoffman's Palais Stoclet (1905) and its coordination of architecture and artistic media to create a "total work of art" (Gesamtkunstwerk) instigated a new interest for Horiguchi: the coordinated environment of the Japanese teahouse. Rather than a remnant of the past, he began to view the teahouse as a Gesamtkunstwerk.

=== Later career ===
He worked together with the MOA Museum of Art in Shizuoka to rebuild the 16th century Golden Tea Room.

He was also a member of the faculty of Kanagawa University and Meiji University.
