= Azuchi Castle =

Japanese castle built by Oda Nobunaga (1579–82)

- 安土城
- Azuchi, Ōmi province, Japan
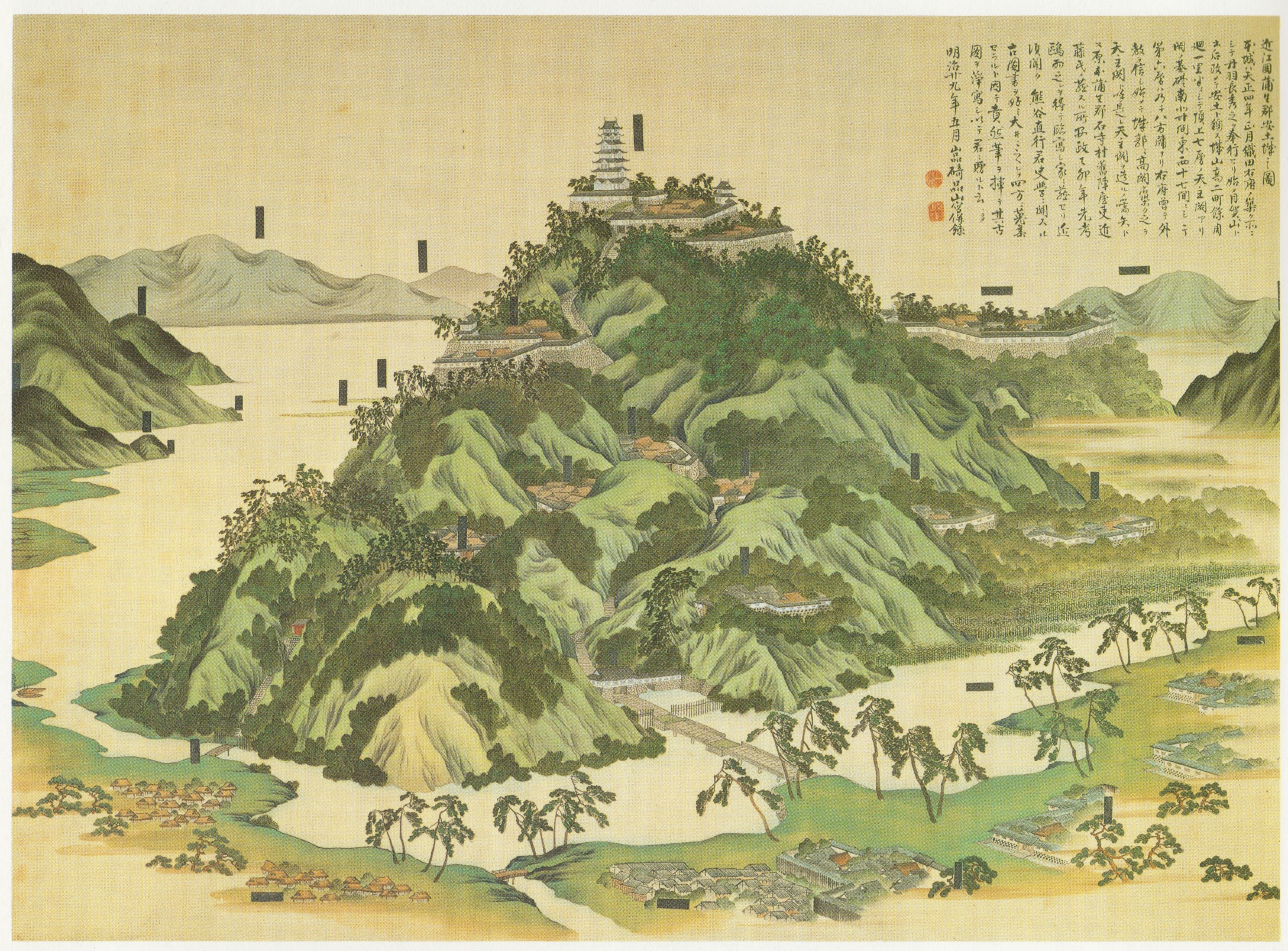
- Painting of Azuchi Castle (by Iwasaki Ōu, 1855)

Site information
- Type: Azuchi-Momoyama castle
- Controlled by: Oda clan
- Condition: Stone base remains

Location
- Azuchi Castle
- Location within Shiga Prefecture Location within Japan
- Coordinates: 35°09′22″N 136°08′22″E
- Height: Seven stories (138ft)(main keep)

Site history
- Built: 1579
- Built by: Oda Nobunaga
- Materials: stone, wood plaster walls
- Demolished: 1582
- Events: Azuchi religious debate (1579)

Garrison information
- Garrison: 5,000 (incl. civilians)

Azuchi Castle (安土城, Azuchi-jō) was one of the primary castles of Oda Nobunaga located in the Azuchi neighborhood of the city of Ōmihachiman, Shiga Prefecture. The site of the castle was designated a National Historic Site in 1926, with the designation upgraded to that of a Special National Historic Site in 1952. The castle is located within the grounds of the Biwako Quasi-National Park.

Azuchi Castle was built from 1576 to 1579 on Mount Azuchi on the eastern shore of Lake Biwa in Ōmi Province. Nobunaga intentionally built Azuchi Castle close enough to Kyoto that he could watch over and guard the approaches to the capital, but outside Kyoto so his fortress would be immune to the fires and conflicts that occasionally consumed the city. Azuchi Castle's location was also strategically advantageous in managing the communications and transportation routes between Nobunaga's greatest foes – the Uesugi to the north, the Takeda in the east, and the Mōri to the west. Azuchi Castle was demolished in 1582 by Akechi Mitsuhide after his assassination of Nobunaga in the Honno-ji Incident.

Many researchers agree that Azuchi Castle was the catalyst for the establishment of early modern castles in Japan from the Azuchi–Momoyama period onwards. Yamajiro (山城, lit. 'Hill castles') of the Sengoku period were, so to speak, earthen fortresses built by cutting through the mountain and heaped up with rocks and earth, with military priority, but Nobunaga's stone castles were a revolutionary departure from these, and became show castles with both political functions.

The Azuchi-Momoyama period of Japanese history partially takes its name from Azuchi Castle.

== History ==
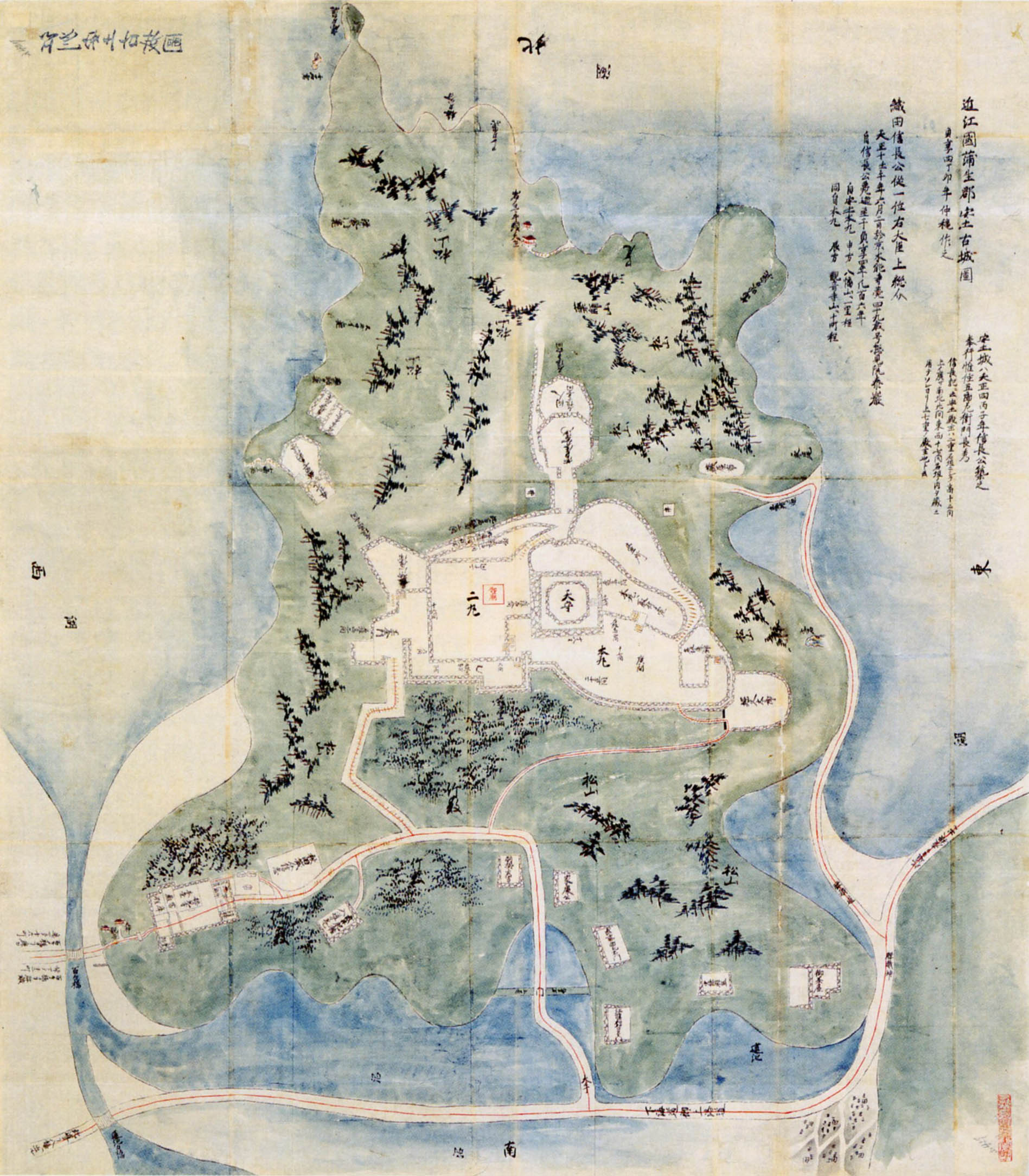
Drawing of the layout plan of the castle

This all-stone-walled castle was built on a vast site on the banks of Lake Biwa as a new stronghold for Oda Nobunaga. Niwa Nagahide had responsibility for constructing the castle, which began in 1576 and completed in 1579.

Unlike earlier castles and fortresses, Azuchi was not intended to be a military structure alone, cold, dark, and foreboding. Nobunaga intended it as a mansion which would impress and intimidate his rivals not only with its defenses, but also with its lavish apartments and decorations, flourishing town, and religious life.

The keep, called tenshu (or tenshukaku), was a seven-storey building with six floors above ground and one below, built as a symbol of the castle rather than as the centre of its defence, and this was the beginning of the full-fledged tenshu in Japanese castles. The building containing audience halls, private chambers, offices, and a treasury, as though it were a royal palace. All seven stories were decorated by Kanō Eitoku.

In addition to being one of the first Japanese castles with a tower keep, the Azuchi keep itself was unique in that its uppermost story was octagonal. In addition, the facade of the Azuchi donjon, unlike the solid white or black of other keeps, was colorfully decorated with tigers and dragons.

There were five main militaristic features of Azuchi Castle that differentiated it from earlier castle designs. Firstly, it was a massive structure, with the walls of the castle ranging from 5.5 to 6.5 meters in thickness. The second feature of Azuchi Castle is the predominant use of stone. The walls were constructed from huge granite stones fitted carefully together without the use of mortar. A third innovation of the Azuchi Castle was the high central tower, or donjon. The tower allowed for increased visibility for the use of guns against an opposing force. Builder's plans for the castle show the donjon to be 40 meters, with seven levels. Fourthly, Azuchi Castle had irregularly formed inner citadels. These inner citadels gave defenders ample defensive positions against intruders.

Nobunaga chose Azuchi-yama for the location of Azuchi Castle, which rises 100 meters above Lake Biwa. The site was strategically placed at the intersection of three highways converging on Kyoto from the east.

Nobunaga desired a full castle town, and built well-defended homes for his generals, a Jōdo-shū Buddhist temple called Jōgon-in, and a number of homes for commoners a short distance away on the shore of the lake. He had trouble convincing people to move into these homes at first, however. In the summer of 1577, he issued a municipal charter, guaranteeing residents immunity from taxes, building or transport levies, and moratoria, and forced all travelers on the Nakasendō highway to stop in the town overnight for lodging, thus bringing business to his town's innkeepers. By 1582, the town's inhabitants numbered roughly 5,000.

In addition to welcoming many of Nobunaga's powerful political guests, such as Tokugawa Ieyasu and Niwa Nagahide, Azuchi castle also hosted an event in 1579 which has come to be known as the Azuchi religious debate, taking place between leaders of the Nichiren and Jōdo-shū sects of Buddhism.

On the night of Urabon-e (Feast of Lanterns) in 1581, Nobunaga made the houses in the castle town put off their lights and lit up Azuchi Castle with lanterns and other decorations to astonish the missionaries leaving the castle. It was even more impressive because the castle was built on the tip of a promontory surrounded on three sides by a lake, and the surrounding area had not yet been reclaimed.

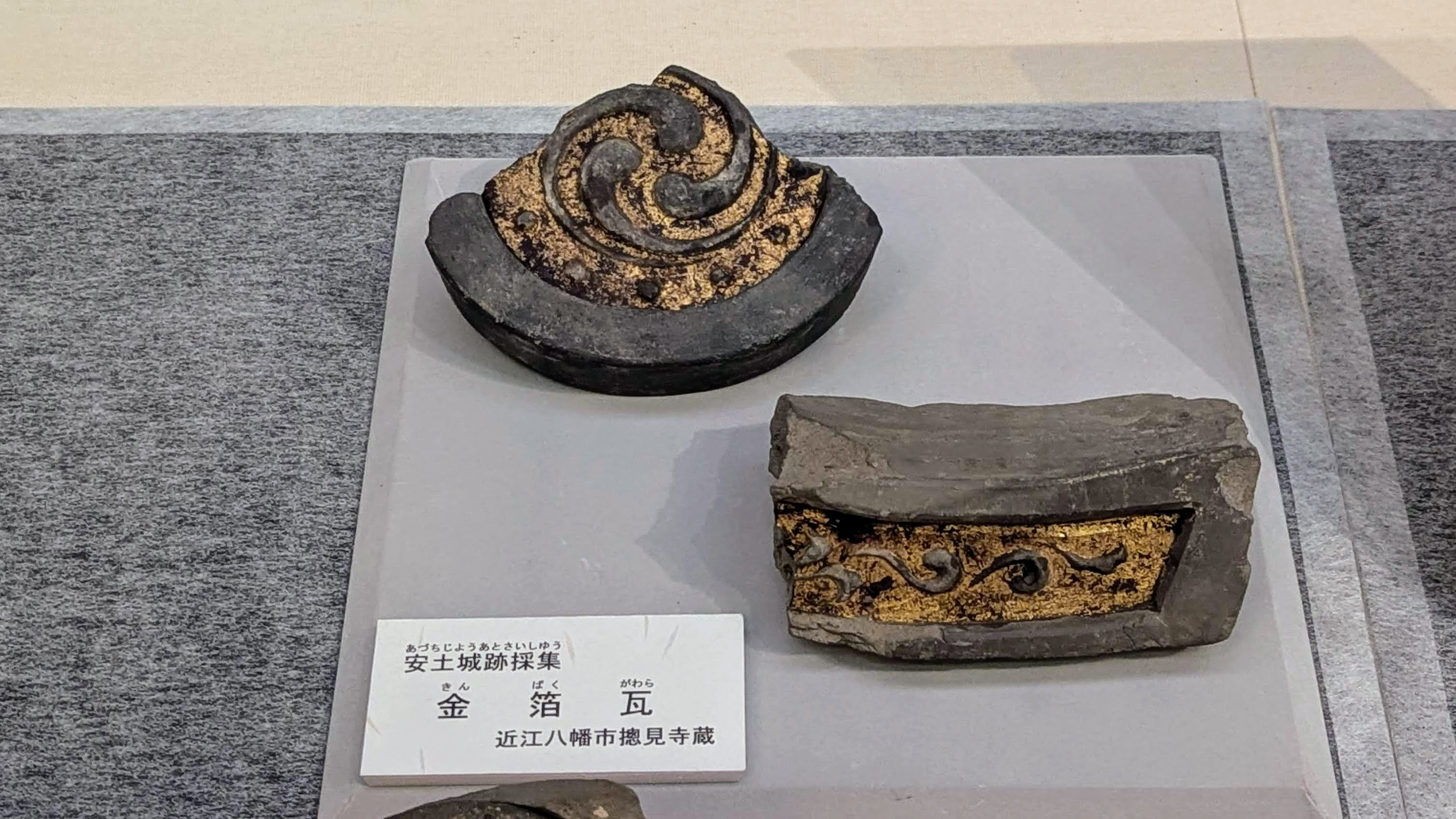
Gold leaf roof tile from the Azuchi Castle site, displayed in the Shiga Prefectural Azuchi Castle Archeological Museum

On New Year's Day (lunar calendar) in 1582, Nobunaga opened the interior of Azuchi Castle to guests of honour. So many people crowded in that part of the stone wall collapsed, resulting in injuries and even deaths. At that time, Nobunaga had instructed the daimyos and their vassals to bring 100 mon (monetary unit) each. After the tour, Nobunaga was waiting for them at the end and received the money in person.

In the summer of 1582, just after Nobunaga's death at Honnō-ji, the castle was taken over by the forces of Akechi Mitsuhide, Nobunaga's betrayer. The castle was set aflame a week or so later, with some accounts claiming this might have been the work of looting townspeople, or of one of Nobunaga's sons.

== Architecture and design ==
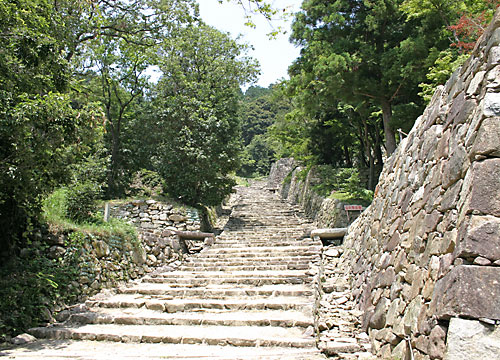
Stone steps leading up through the Azuchi Castle ruin

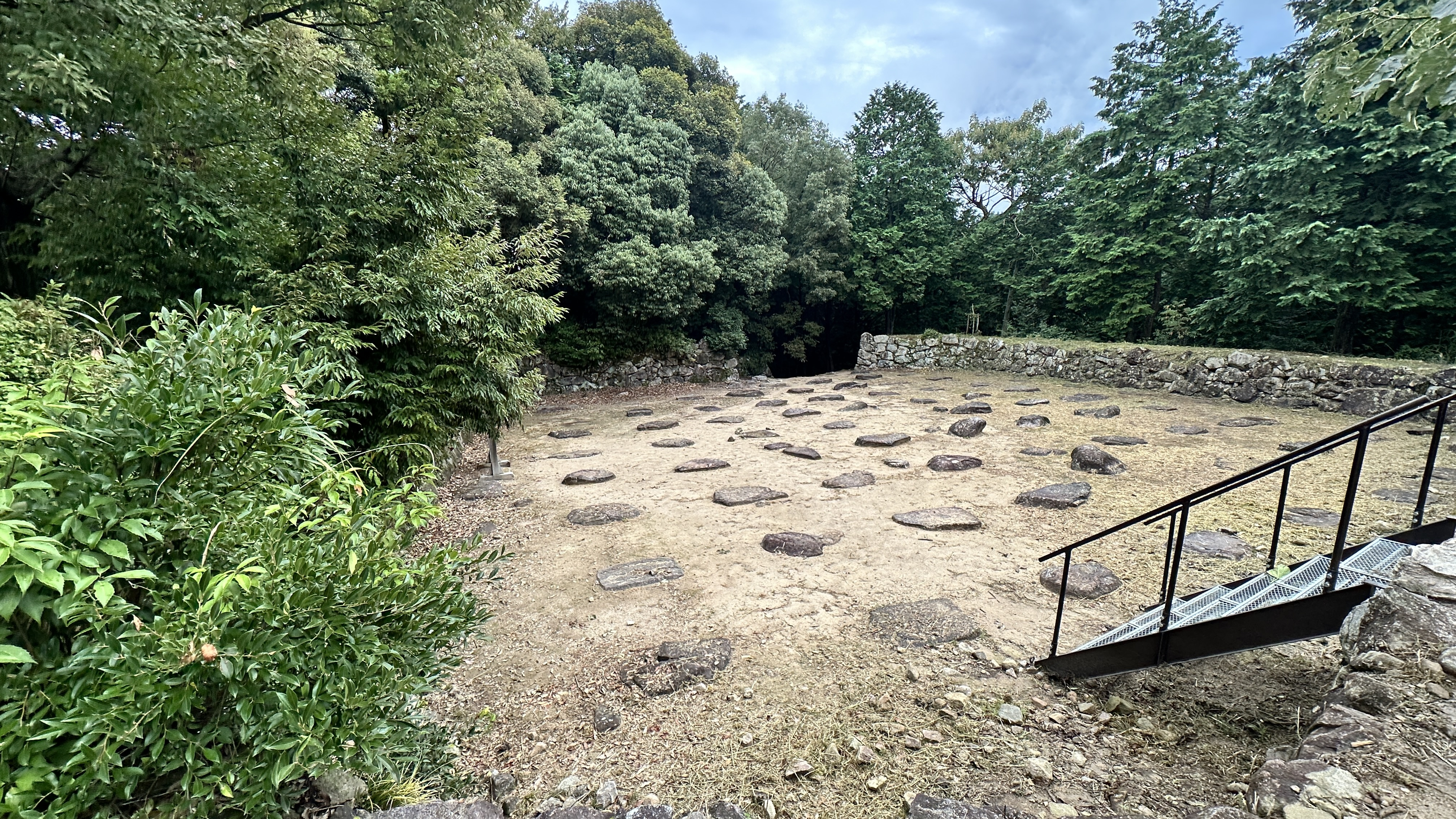
Ruins of the tenshu, or keep

Confucius and other Confucian figures were depicted in paintings at Azuchi Castle. The highest respect given to Confucianism in Azuchi Castle implies that Nobunaga's ideas were shifting from tactics for the battlefield to the responsibility of ruling the realm and ensuring peace and order all around.

In 1976, the Japanese architectural historian Akira Naitō published what he believed to be a conclusive summary of the features of Azuchi Castle. He concluded that the tenshu was 46 meters in height, with a gilded octagonal belvedere on top. An atrium rose from the basement level to the fourth floor ceiling, supposedly influenced by the Jesuits, but with a stupa at the atrium floor center. However, the external design of Azuchi Castle is still debated. Another Japanese Architectural Historian, Miyakami Shigetaka, has accused Naitō of failing to corroborate his theory with enough documentation.

== Azuchi screens ==
The Azuchi Screens are a set of six-folding screens depicting Azuchi Castle and its nearby town. Oda Nobunaga gifted them to Pope Gregory XIII, who displayed them in the Vatican collections, where they were admired by visitors. However, they disappeared from historical record. Their fate is unknown and they are considered to be lost. The screens must have been pivotal works in the development of Japanese folding screens.

== Modern times ==
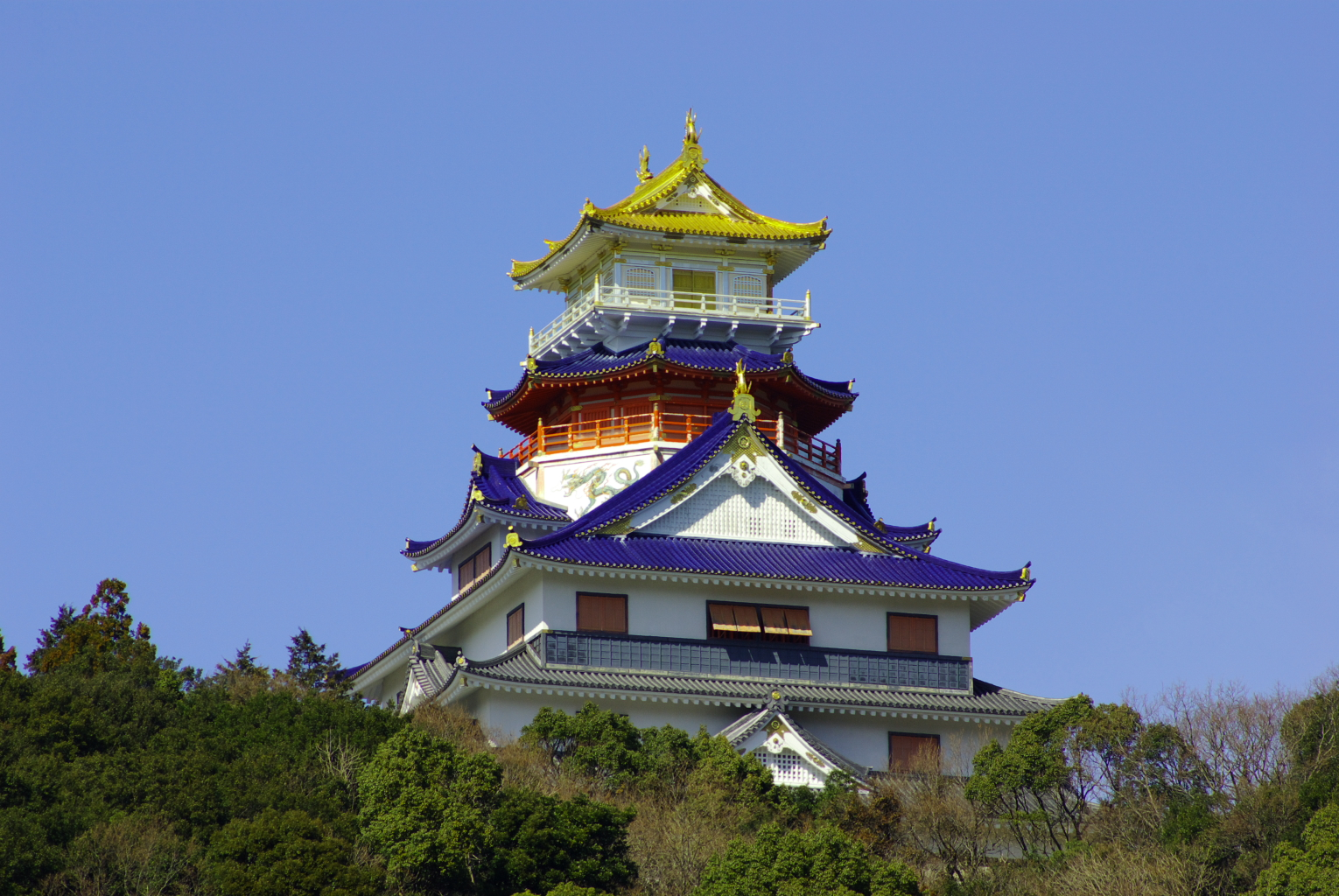
Azuchi Castle replica in Ise Sengoku Village

All that remains of the castle today is the stonework. However, an approximate reproduction of the Azuchi Castle donjon, based on illustrations and historical descriptions, stands in Ise Sengoku Village, a samurai theme park near Ise. In addition, a full-scale replica of the top floors of the donjon is on display at the Nobunaga no Yakata Museum near the original castle ruins.

Azuchi Castle was listed as one of Japan's Top 100 Castles by the Japan Castle Foundation in 2006.

== In popular culture ==
The construction of the castle was the theme of the 2009 period drama film Castle Under Fiery Skies (火天の城, Katen no Shiro), based on Kenichi Yamamoto's novel of the same name and directed by Tanaka Mitsutoshi.

== See also ==
- List of Special Places of Scenic Beauty, Special Historic Sites and Special Natural Monuments
- Golden Tea Room
