= Azuchi, Shiga =

Former town which is now part of the city of Ōmihachiman, Shiga Prefecture, Japan

Coordinates: 35°8′N 136°8′E

Location of Azuchi in Shiga Prefecture

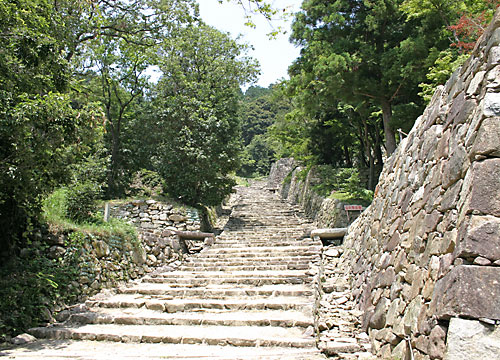
Stone steps leading up to the Azuchi Castle ruins.

Azuchi (安土町, Azuchi-chō; Japanese pronunciation: [aꜜ.(d)ɯ.tɕi, a.(d)ɯ.tɕi̥ꜜ.tɕoː]) was a town located in Gamō District, Shiga Prefecture, Japan.

As of 2003, the town had an estimated population of 12,217 and a density of 502.76 persons per km^{2}. The total area was 24.30 km^{2}.

On March 21, 2010, Azuchi was merged into the expanded city of Ōmihachiman.

The town is well known for the ruins of Azuchi Castle of Oda Nobunaga, the 16th century ruler of Japan, and once depicted on the now lost Azuchi Screens. The period in the history of Japan approximately between 1568 and 1603 is called Azuchi-Momoyama period. Azuchi Castle ruins remain for the temple Soken-ji donated by Oda Nobunaga. He also established the oldest Christian Seminary in Japan, and its ruins are now a small public park.

== Transportation ==
Azuchi Station of The Biwako Line railway provides public transportation to the town.

The National Route 8 passes through the town.
