= Japanese in the Philippines =

Japanese Filipino, Japanese people in the Philippines
日系 / 日系人 / 日系フィリピン人 にっけい / にっけいじん Hapon / Hapones / Haponesa Pilipinong Hapones Nikkei / Nikkeijin / Japino / Japinoy
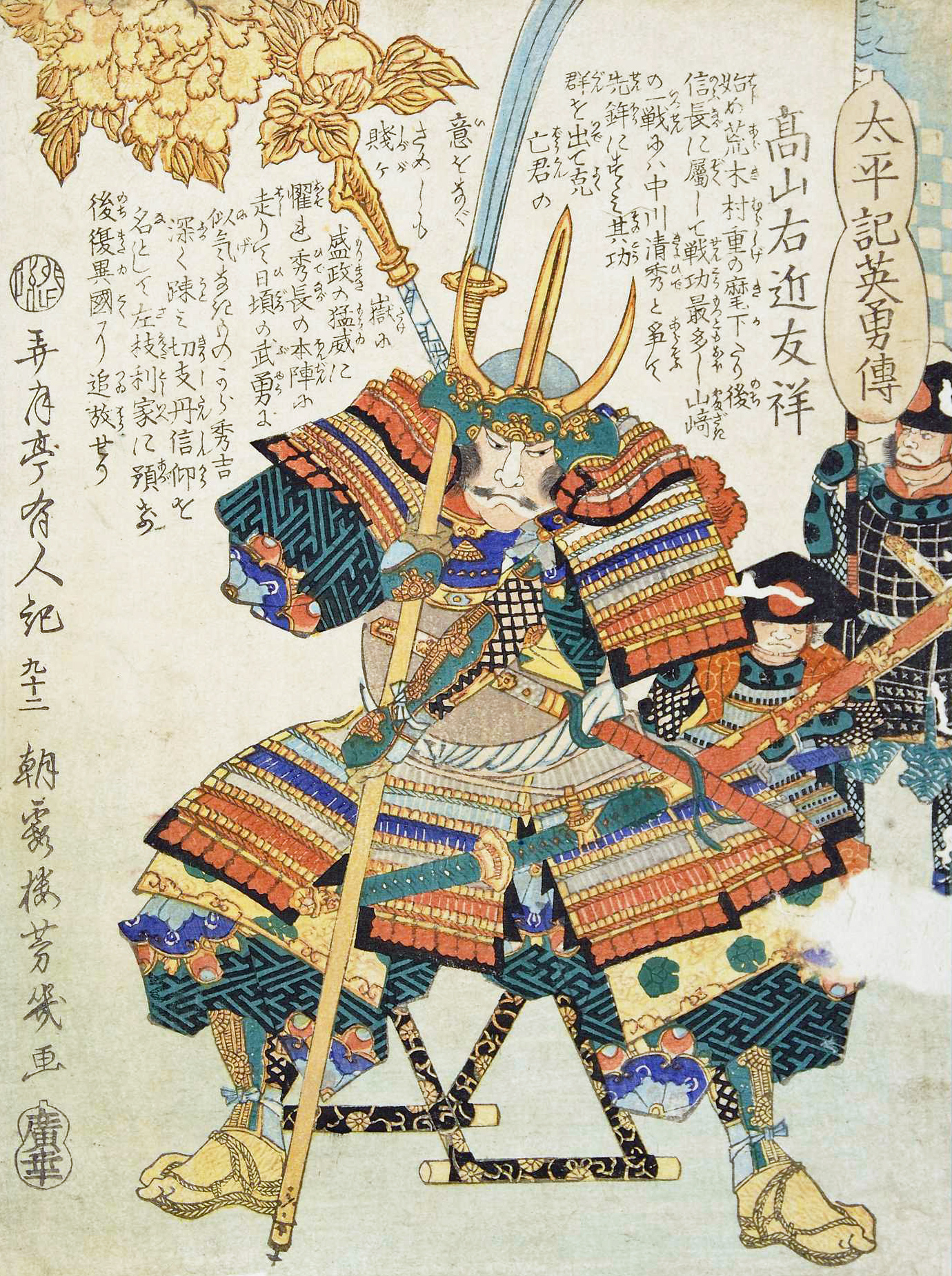
- Takayama Ukon was a Japanese Catholic daimyō who migrated to the Philippines together with 300 Kirishitan refugees in 1614.

Total population
- Japanese nationals 15,728 (Dec. 2021); People of Japanese descent 120,000 (2006)

Regions with significant populations
- Metro Manila, Davao, the Visayas, Ilocos Norte, La Union, Baguio, Laguna, Cavite, Rizal, Bulacan, Pampanga, Zambales

Languages
- Japanese, Filipino, other languages of the Philippines, English

Religion
- Christianity, Shinto, Buddhism

Related ethnic groups
- Japanese people, foreign-born Japanese, Japanese diaspora

Japanese in the Philippines, or Japanese Filipino, refers to one of the largest branches of Japanese diaspora having historical contact with and having established themselves in what is now the Philippines. This also refers to Filipino citizens of either pure or mixed Japanese descent residing in the country, the latter a result of intermarriages between the Japanese and local populations.

== History ==
=== Classical period ===
==== Settlements ====
After the establishment of a single state within Japan, official trade records began between Japan and the Philippine islands in the Heian and Muromachi period (8th to 12th centuries CE). In the case of the proto-Okinawan chiefdoms, this was much earlier, and ties in with shared migration patterns of Okinawans and Austronesian areas like the Philippines stretching back to the Neolithic period. Notable settlements of the period include Bolinao and Agoo along Lingayen Gulf. The Japanese were trading with Philippine kingdoms well before the Spanish period, mainly in pottery and gold. Historical records show that Japanese traders, especially those from Nagasaki, frequently visited the Philippine shores and bartered Japanese goods for such Filipino products as gold and pearls. In the course of time, shipwrecked Japanese sailors, pirate traders, and immigrants settled in the Philippines and intermarried with the early Filipinos. The Wokous who were East Asian pirates mostly consisting of Japanese, even made it into the Philippines before their extermination in the 1600s. Aparri in the Philippines, which is located in Northern Luzon, was established as pirate city-state under the patronage of the Wokou. The area around Aparri was the site of the 1582 Cagayan battles between Japanese pirates and Spanish soldiers. When the Spaniards reached the island of Luzon in 1571, they found Japanese colonies and settlements in Manila and in some parts of the Cagayan Valley, the Cordillera region, Lingayen, Bataan, and Catanduanes Island. The relatively light complexion of the natives of Bontoc and Banaue is probably a result of the early contacts between the Japanese and other islanders from south of Japan and the natives of the Cordillera.

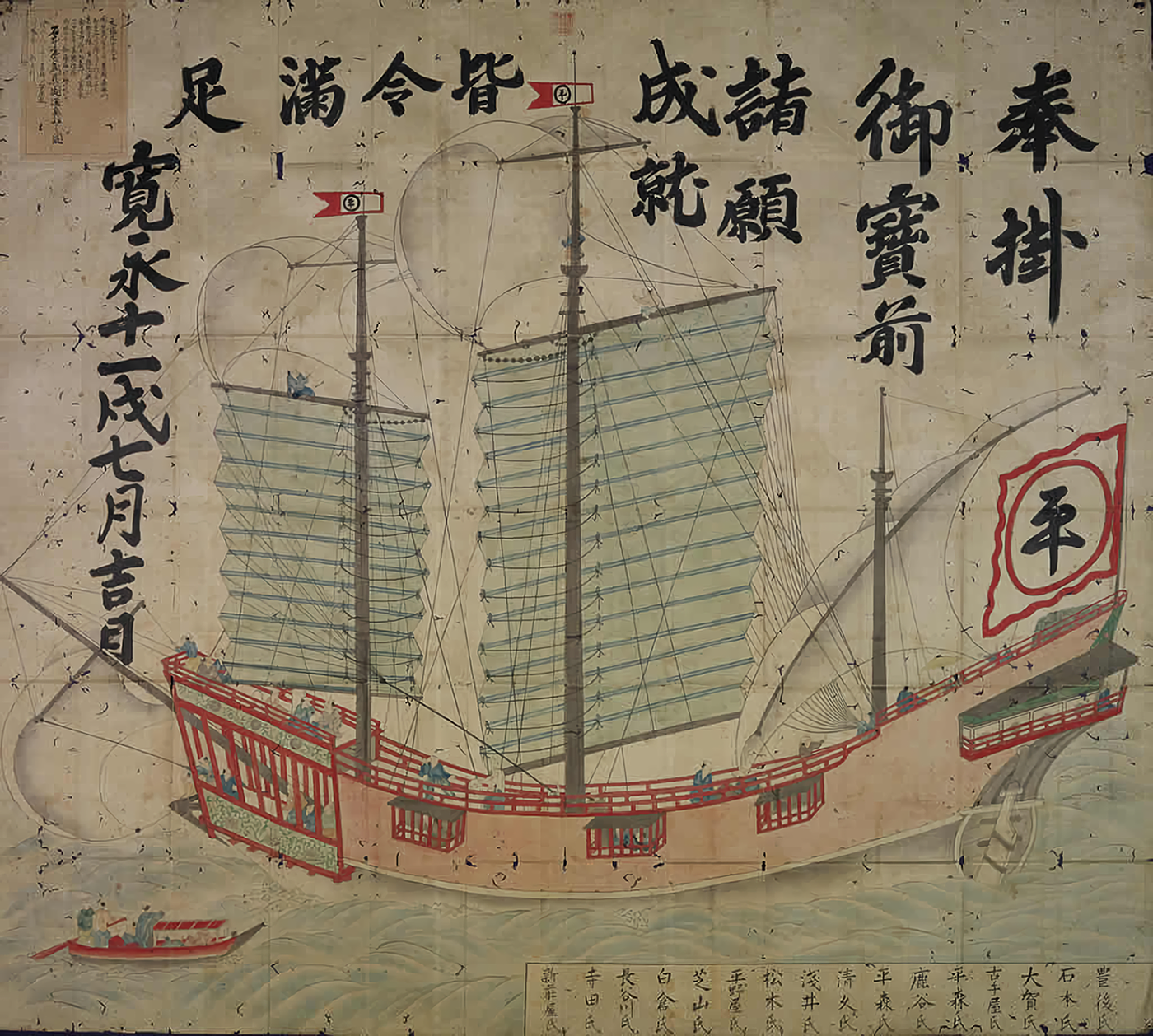
Red Seal ships transported Japanese merchants

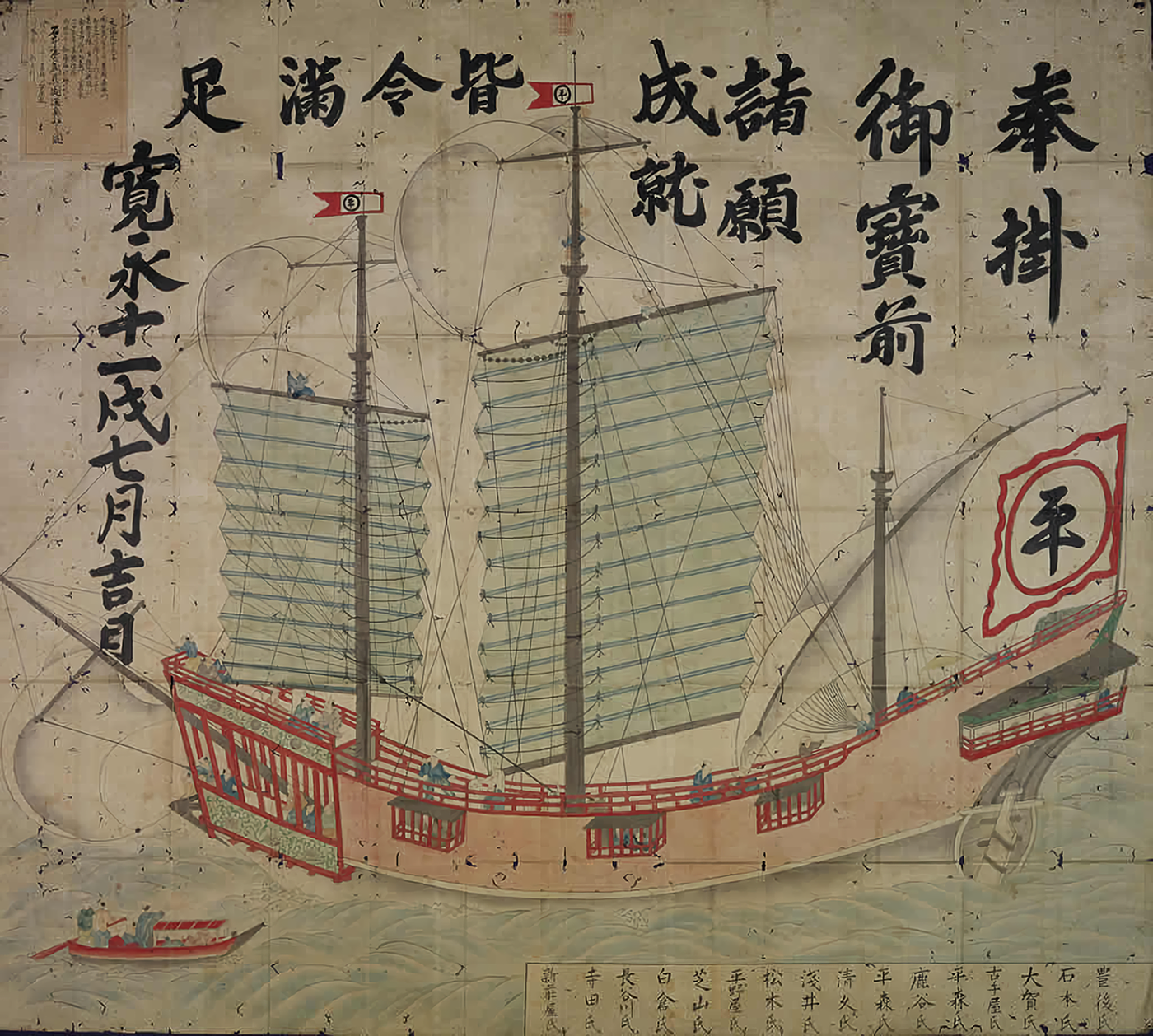
A 1634 Japanese Red Seal ship, transporting Japanese merchants

==== Pottery trade ====
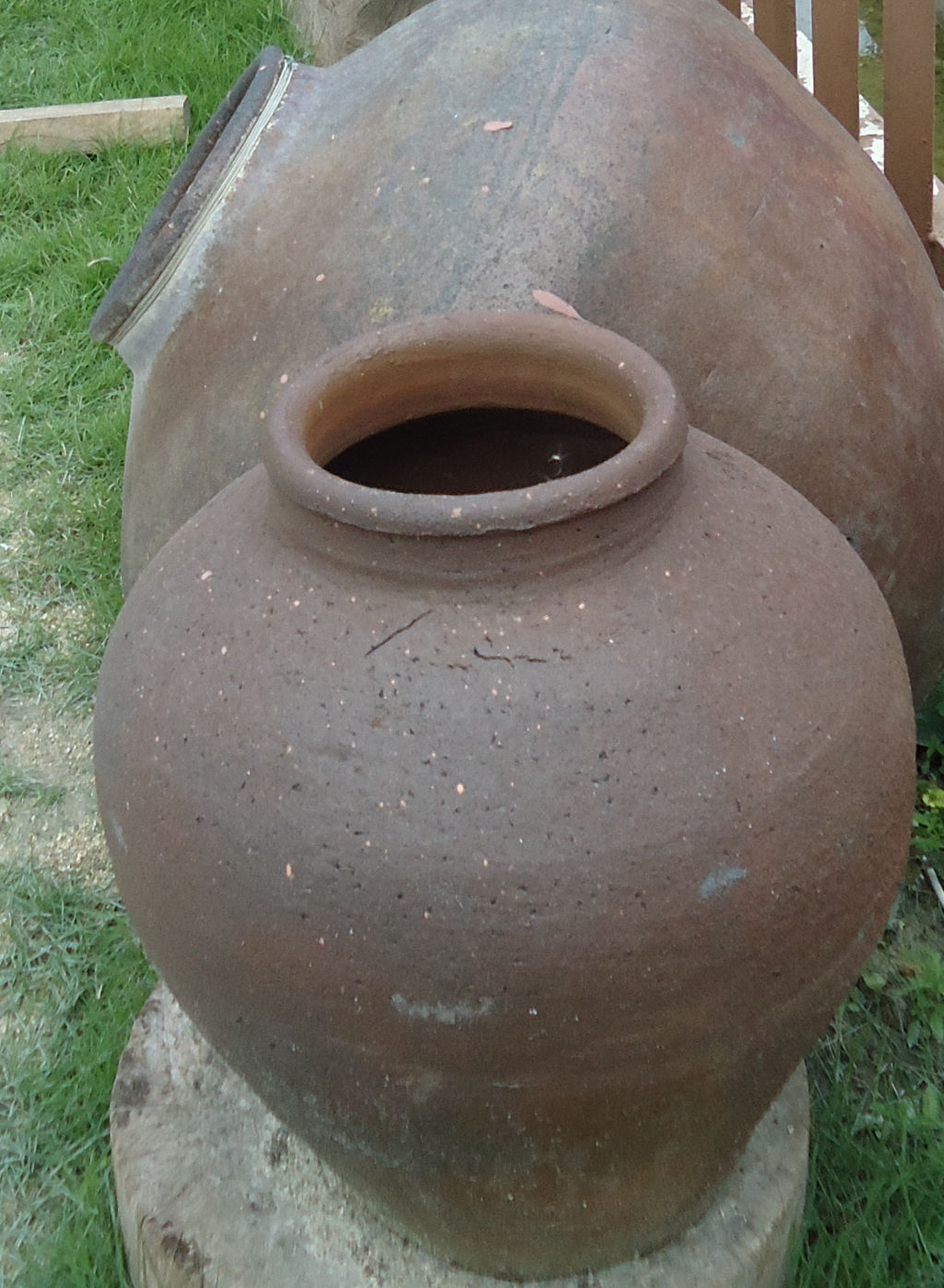
Traditional tapayan jar, used as a lawn ornament, water jar, or for bread baking, from the Philippines

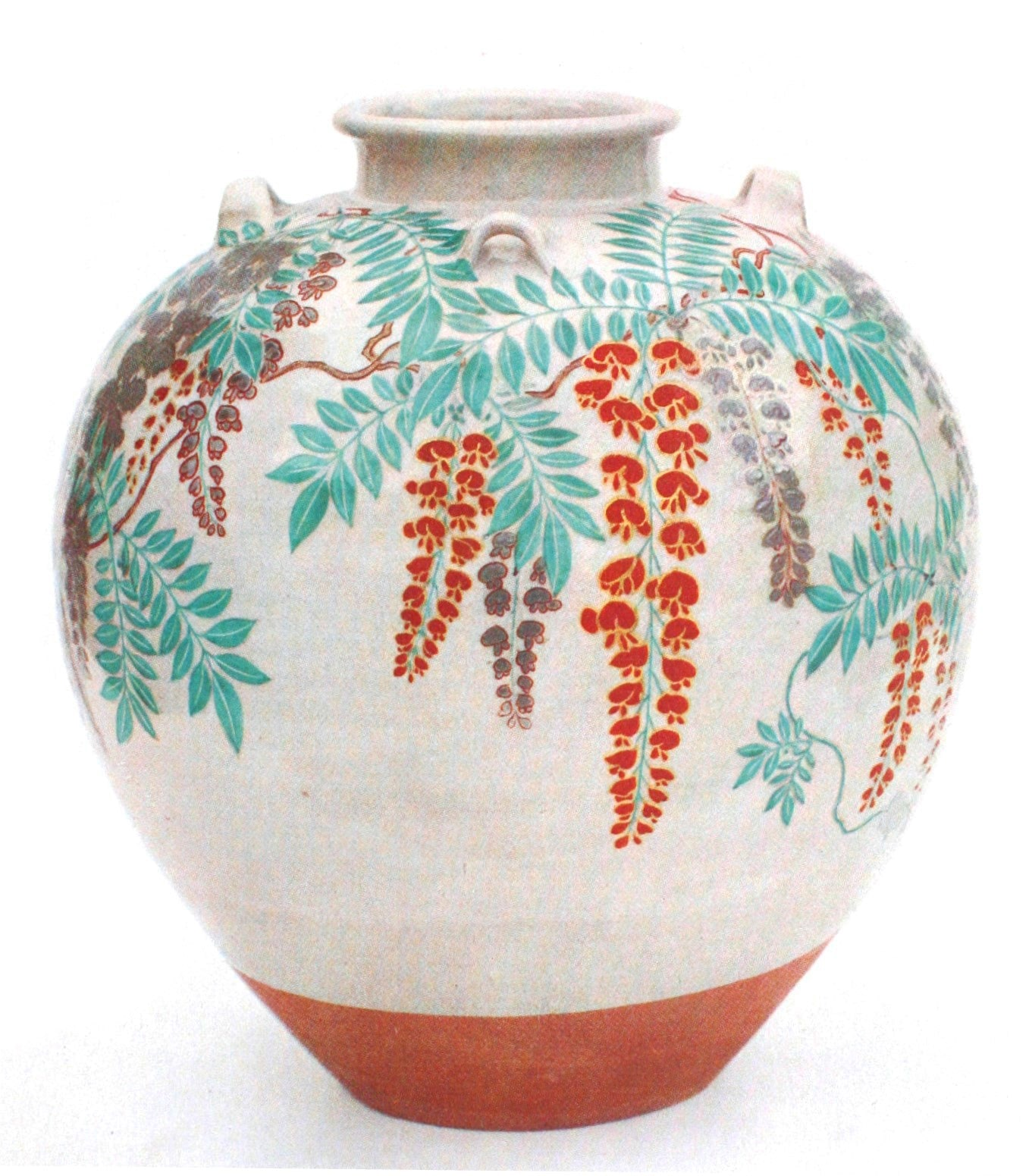
Painted Tea-leaf jar, used as a tea canister, with wisteria designs by Nonomura Ninsei, Edo period Japan

Precolonial Philippines had a rich pottery tradition as verified by the finds at Ayub Cave in South Cotabato and other parts of the archipelago. Japanese texts mention trading expeditions to the island of Rusun (Luzon) for the highly prized Martaban jars. Martaban jars (Japanese: 呂宋壺, Hepburn: Rusun tsubo), also known as "Luzon jars", were dark-brown to purple-black tapayan from the island of Luzon that had originally been made in Southern China and had been exported to the Philippines. These were highly sought after by Japanese traders in the 16th century Nanban trade and remain as valuable antique heirlooms in modern Japan. They are primarily used for the Japanese tea ceremony (chanoyu). They were prized for their simplicity and rough, often uneven design, epitomizing the traditional Japanese aesthetics of wabi-sabi ("perfection in imperfection"). The Tokiko calls the Rusun and Namban jars, Ru-sun tsukuru or Lu-sung ch'i (in Chinese), which simply means "made in Luzon." These Rusun jars, which had rokuru (wheel mark), were said to be more precious than gold because of its ability to act as tea canisters and enhance the fermentation. In the 15th century AD, tea-jars were brought by the shōguns to Uji in Kyoto from the Philippines which was used in the Japanese tea ceremony.

The Spanish historian Antonio de Morga in his Sucesos de la Islas Filipinas (1609) described Rusun jars as thus:

In this island of Luzon, especially in the provinces of Manila, Pampanga, Pangasinan and Ilocos the natives have ancient earthenware jars (tibores) which are brown in color and not especially attractive to look at. Some of these are medium-sized, others smaller, and they have certain marks and stamps on them but no one knows how to explain these, nor knows whence they came nor when, for they are no longer imported or made here. The Japanese seek them and think highly of them, for they have discovered that the root [sic] of a certain plant called cha (tea), which the kings and lords of Japan drink hot, both as a refreshment and medicine, can best be kept and preserved in these jars. Hence throughout Japan these jars are regarded highly as being the most precious jewels of their inner rooms and chambers, and the Japanese adorn them on the outside with fine, elegantly wrought gold and keep them in brocade cases. One of them is worth a great sum there, for some jars are valued at, and sold for, two thousand taels at the rate of eleven reales per tael. It makes no difference whether they be cracked or chipped, for that does not prevent them from holding cha. The natives of these islands sell them to the Japanese for the best possible price and they are diligent in seeking them out for the sake of the profit to be made. However, few are to be found these days because of the zeal with which they have been sought up to the present.

Rusun jars were part of what is collectively known as Mishima ("three islands") ware. With the other two islands being indigenous Taiwan and the unidentified "Amakawa".

Many of the important pottery traditions that spread into the Oceania region had their counterparts in the Philippines including the well-known Lapita culture. This quote from American anthropologist Wilhelm Solheim illustrates the matter:

I hypothesize that the Sa-huynh Kalanay and Lapita pottery traditions had a common origin somewhere in the Palawan-Sarawak-Sulu Sea-Sulawesi area and that it was at this point in time and space that a second and main stage in the spread of the Austronesian languages began.

The finds at Ayub Cave in South Cotabato confirmed the great pottery tradition of the Philippines. In the Tokiko it mentions that all Rusun jars had this marking known as the rokuru (wheel mark). Those familiar with Philippine ethnography will know that this spiral is commonly used by many of the Philippine tribes. The following symbols were used to identify which kiln was used to make the jar: identified "Imbe" jars, meant jars coming from Bizen kiln, and mark three times meant a canister from the same oven. A jar with this mark is said to be made of Namban clay. This marking corresponds to the syllable la in Pampanga; Tagbanua for ka ("Chinese Pottery", Field Museum of Natural History-Anth., vol.xii, Jul.1912) Of course, the symbol for la can also be the same as that for lu, and so this might correspond to the symbol said to stand for Lu in Rusun-no kokuji (Luzon national writing). According to the Tokiko, certain types of Rusun jars were distinguished by this character. De Morga mentions that Japanese traders were still coming in large numbers for these jars during his time, and that they were willing to spend great sums for them. Apparently work on these jars continued in the North, possibly among the unconquered Igorots, for De Morga had no knowledge of such current production. Later, the knowledge may have again trickled down to Vigan, where a flourishing industry of Burnay jar manufacture survives to this day. Although the Japanese described very high quality jars coming from the Philippines, not all were of elegant nature. In fact, De Morga had some disdain for some of the jars that the Japanese were buying, so they could have been similar to the well-known balanga and other jars in use today. These jars are generally handed down as heirlooms and are noted for their qualities in enhancing the fermentation process. Possibly one of the Japanese uses for the Rusun jars was fermentation of products like Kombucha and Umeboshi plums. For instance, a Japanese family in rural Japan stated that their family used old Rusun jars for exactly this purpose up to this day. In 2009, Japanese and Filipino archaeologists from the Sumitomo Foundation-funded Boljoon Archaeological Project conducted by the University of San Carlos with the National Museum of the Philippines, discovered ancient Japanese pottery that has been believed to have been in existence since the early 1700s. The ancient Japanese pottery that was discovered there, has proven that there was activity of trading activity between Japan and Cebu Island Philippines going back to the 16th century.

==== Fishing technologies ====
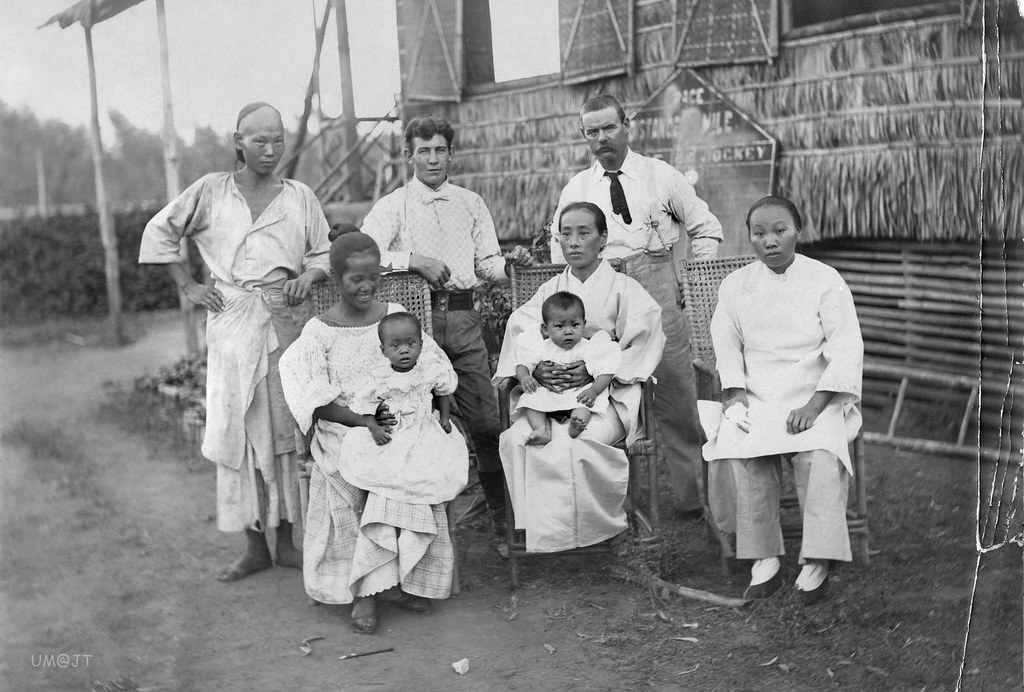
A native Filipina with Chinese, American / European and Japanese settlers in the Philippines, (1900)

The Filipinos were skilled in all types of fishing and fisheries. In the south, the basnig, a Viking-like ship, was and is the vessel of choice among the Bisayans for ocean fishing. The salambao is a type of raft that utilizes a large fishing net which is lowered into the water via a type of lever made of two criss-crossed poles. Night fishing was accomplished with the help of candles similar to the copal of Mexico. These candles were made from a particular type of resin. Fish corrals, like the ones still used today, were also employed by the ancient Filipino. However, the area in which the Filipino most astonished Westerners was in their advanced aquaculture:

To the early Spaniards, the pisciculture of the Filipinos was regarded almost as a new art, so much more advanced it was than fish breeding methods in Europe.

Many have looked to Japan for an explanation for these advanced methods. The roe was transplanted to safe pens for incubation and to guard the small fry from predators. Only when sufficiently mature to fend for themselves were they released back into the wild. These days this method is practiced by fisheries throughout the world. Before the Spanish came, the Filipinos also only used large mesh nets when fishing in rivers, lakes or in the sea. This ecologically sound practice protected the young ensuring future good catches. However, the competition brought by the Spaniards resulted in the use of such small mesh nets that the Spanish themselves eventually had to regulate the nets to prevent the destruction of the fisheries. Other Pre-Spanish Filipino industries included the manufacture of liquors and vinegars like tuba, basi, etc., the production of hides for export to Japan, export of edible bird's nests from Northern Palawan to China, the raising and trade of civet cats, the manufacture of gunpowder, the making of wax for export to China, and the making of cotton stockings for export.

=== Spanish era ===
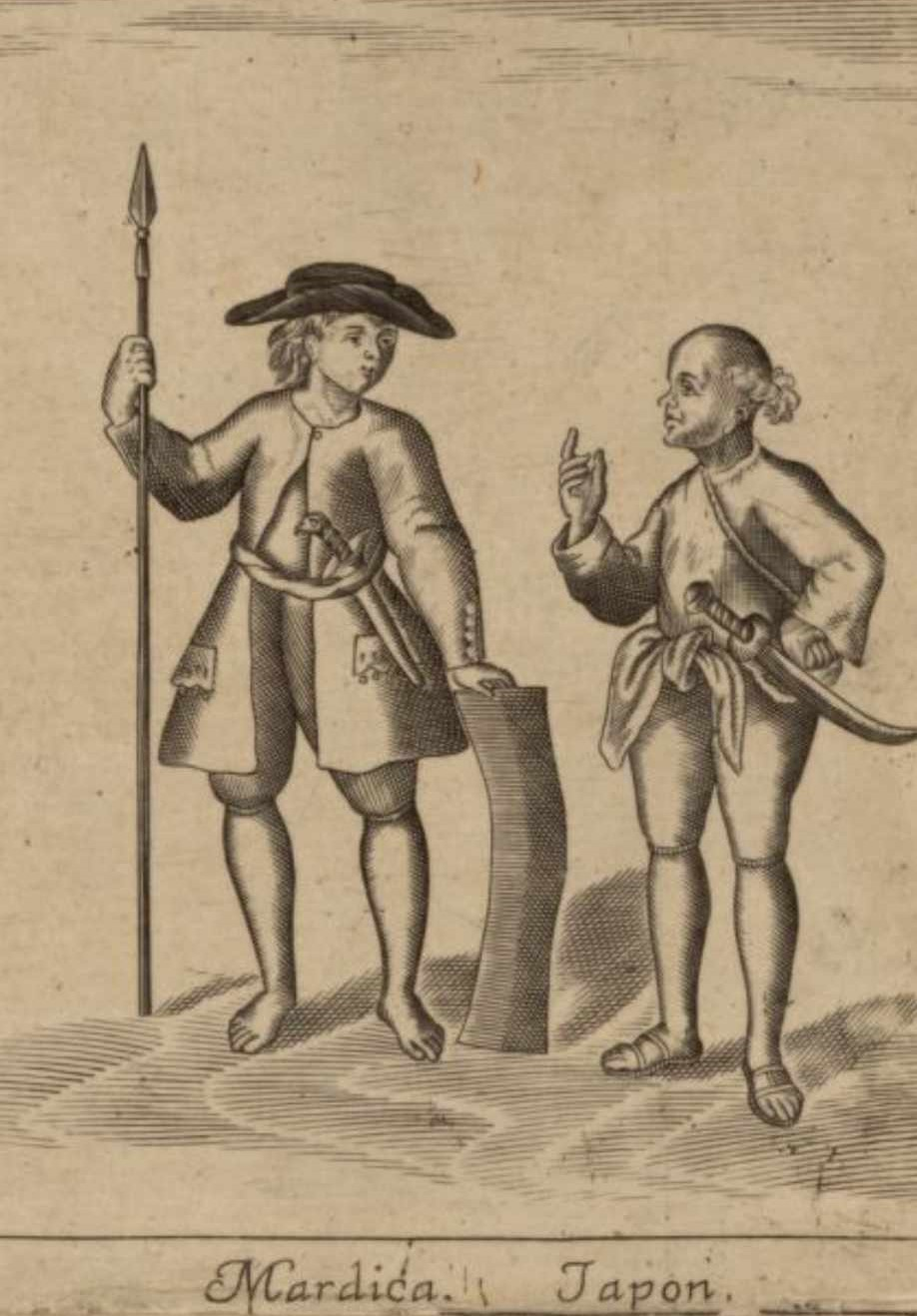
Velarde map depiction of a Japanese Kirishitan settler in the Philippines (right) talking to a Mardica (left)

The Japanese population in the Philippines has since included descendants of Japanese Catholics and other Japanese Christians who fled from the religious persecution imposed by the Tokugawa shogunate during the Edo period and settled during the colonial period from the 17th century until the 19th century. A statue of daimyō Ukon Takayama, who was exiled to the Philippines in 1614 because he refused to disavow his Christian beliefs, stands a patch of land across the road from the Post Office building in the Paco, Manila. In the 17th century, the Spaniards referred to the Paco Area as the 'Yellow Plaza' because of the more than 3,000 Japanese who resided there. In the 16th and 17th centuries, thousands of Japanese people traders also migrated to the Philippines and assimilated into the local population. pp. 52–3

Many of the Japanese men intermarried with Filipino women. A sizeable population settled in Manila, Davao, the Visayas and in the 1600s in Dilao, Paco, and Ilocos Norte Province. This hybrid group tend to be re-assimilated either into the Filipino or the Japanese communities, and thus no accurate denominations could be established, though their estimates range from 100,000 to 200,000. Many were killed or expelled after World War II because of their alleged collaboration with the Imperial Japanese Army (mostly as translator). Many Japanese mestizos tended to deny their Japanese heritage and changed their family names in order to avoid discrimination.

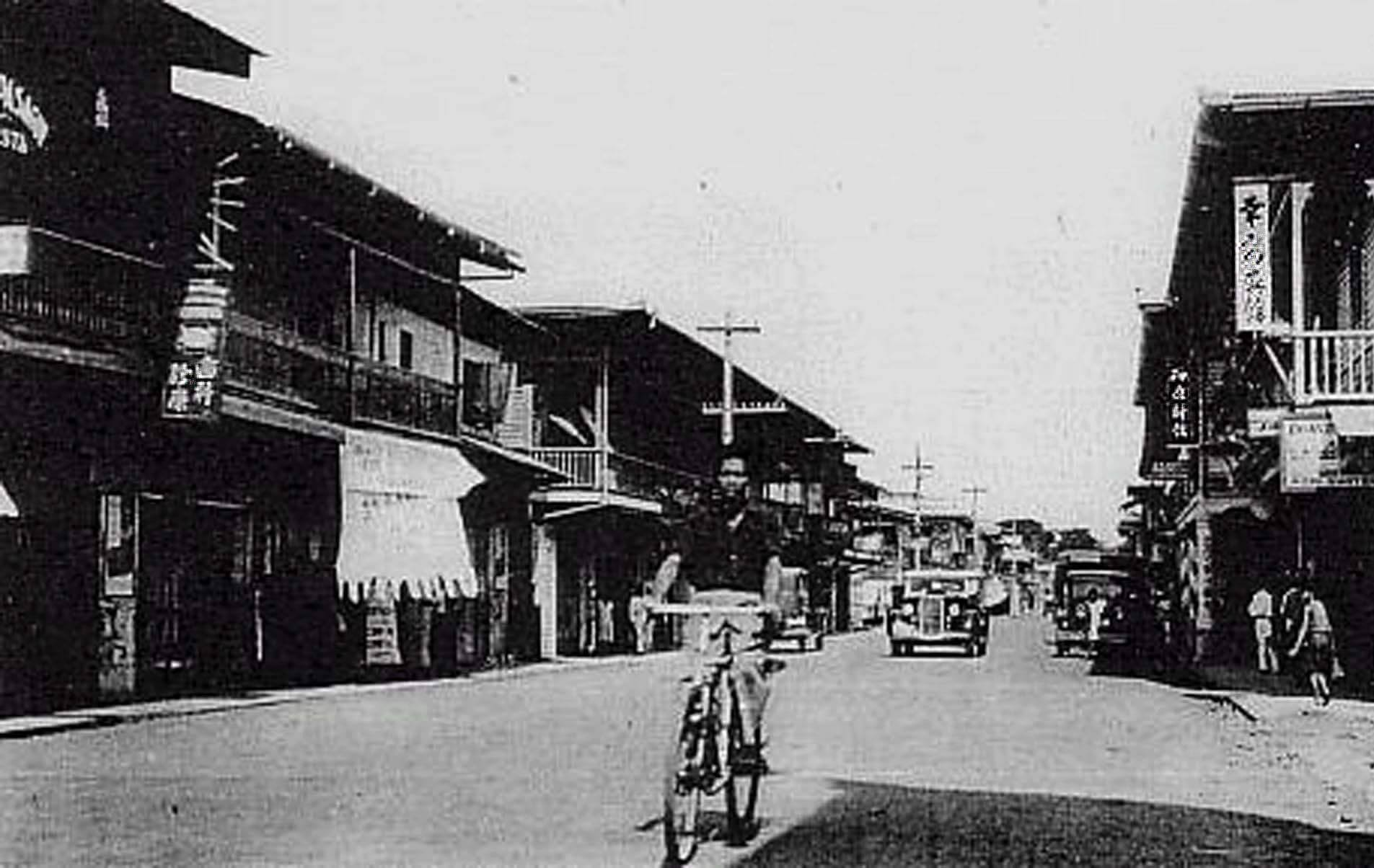
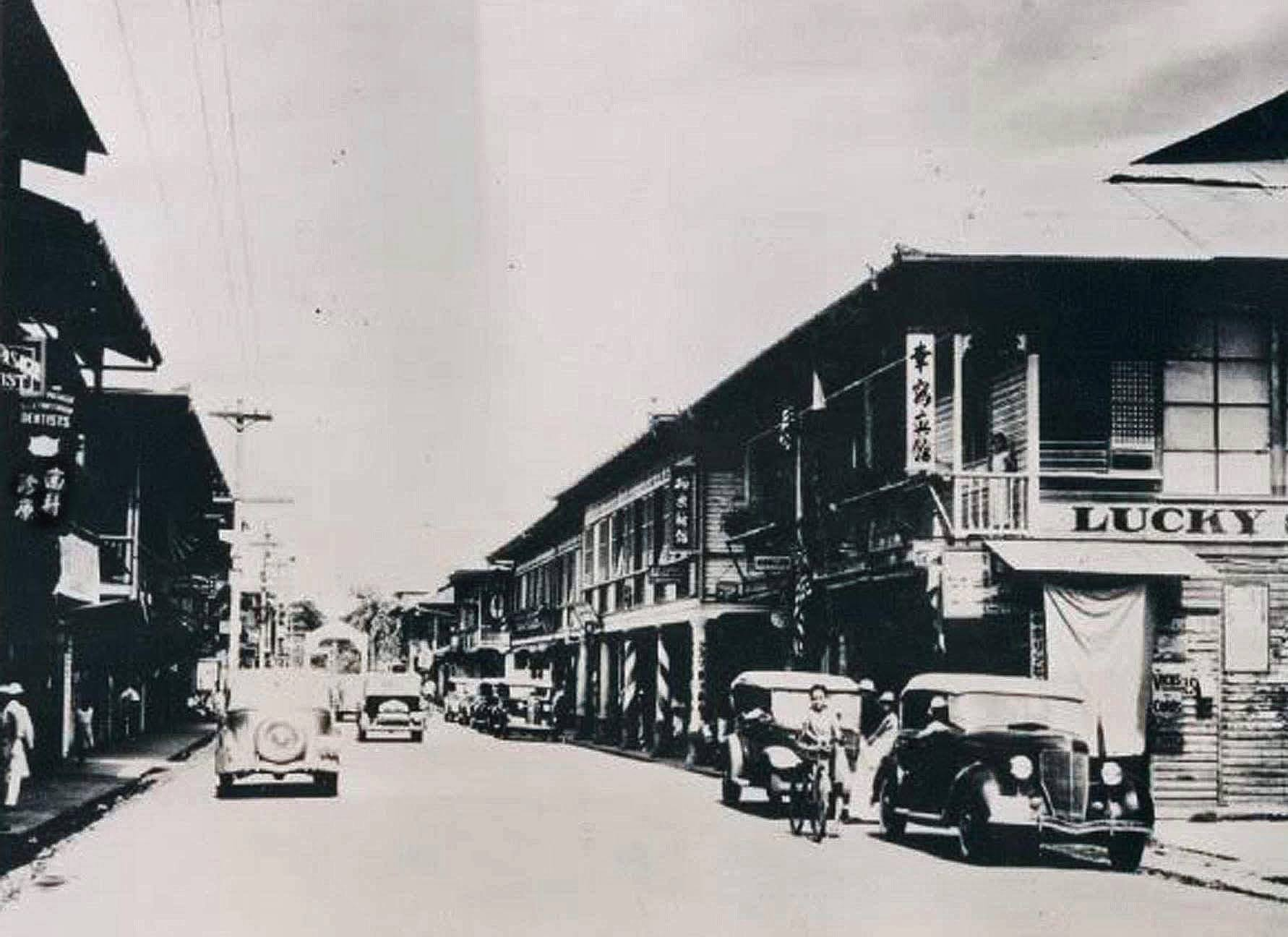
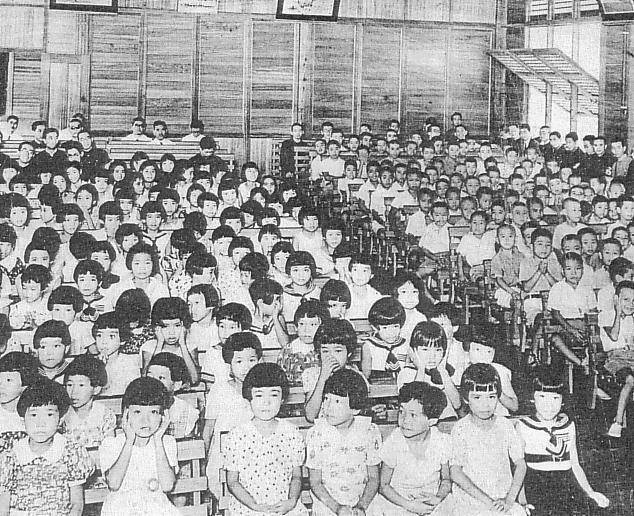
Little Tokyo in Davao City, Philippines (1936), Japanese school in Davao City (1939), where reportedly more than half of the students were mixed.

=== American period and the Post-WWII era ===
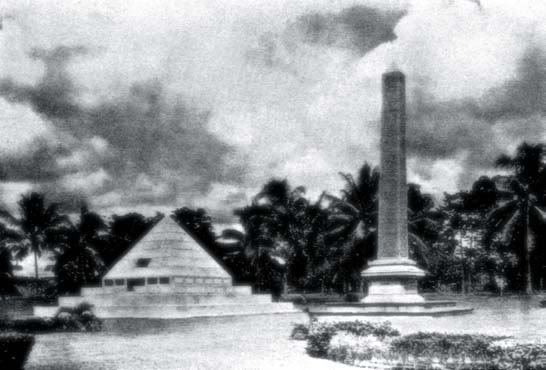
Ohta Kyozaburo Monument in Mintal, Davao City, Philippines (1926)

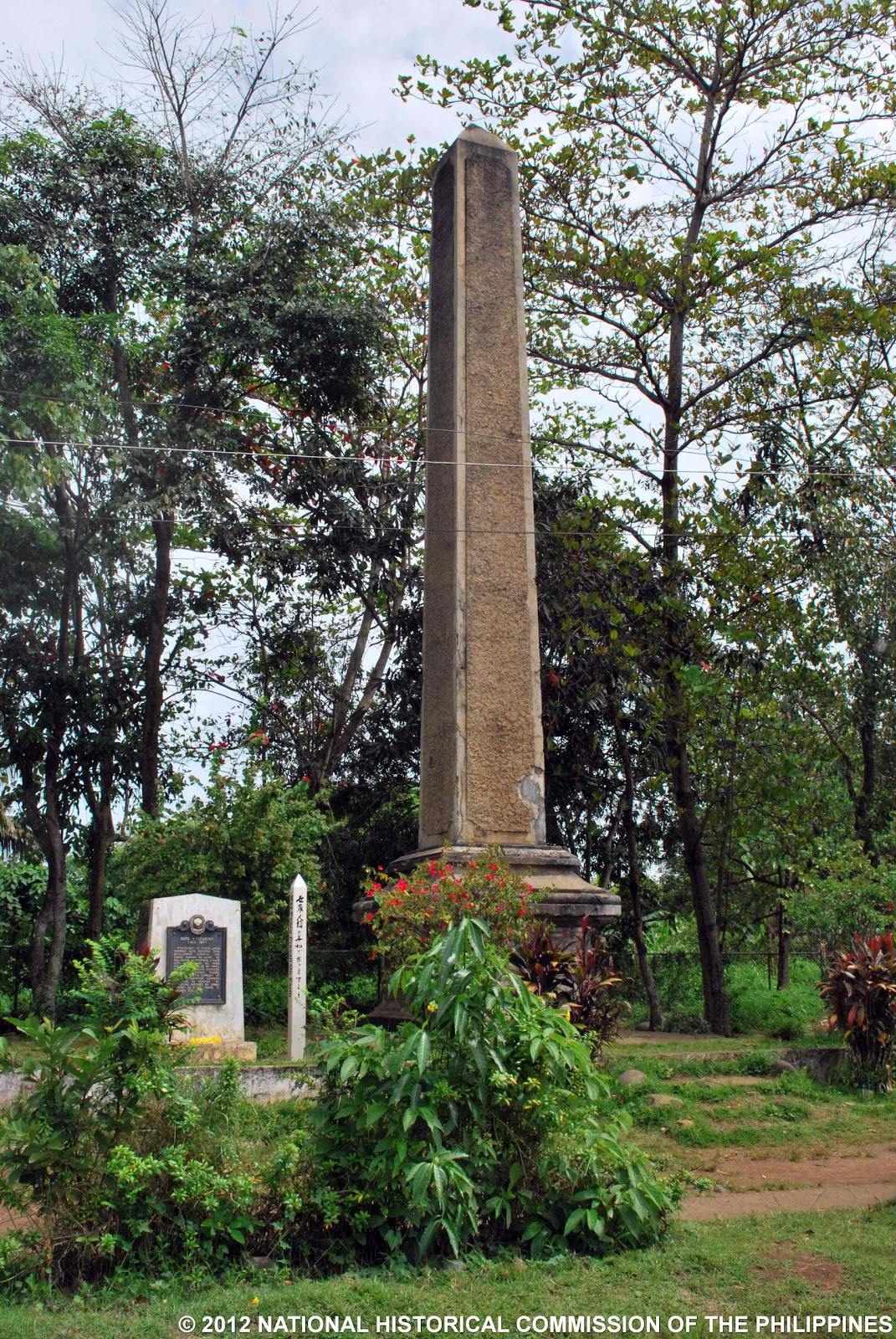
Monument as of 2012, adjacent structure is left in ruins since WW2

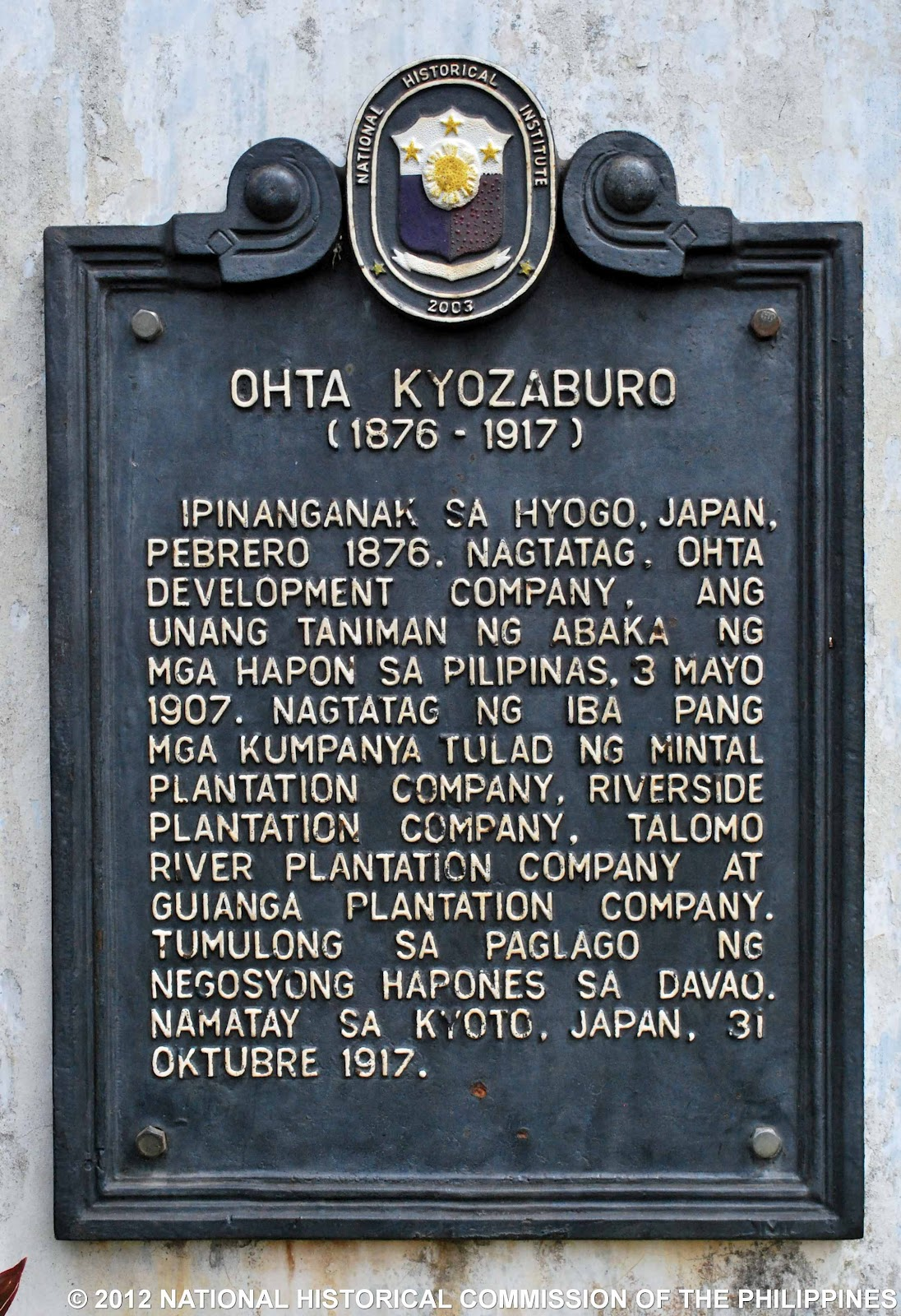
Ohta Kyozaburo Historical Marker

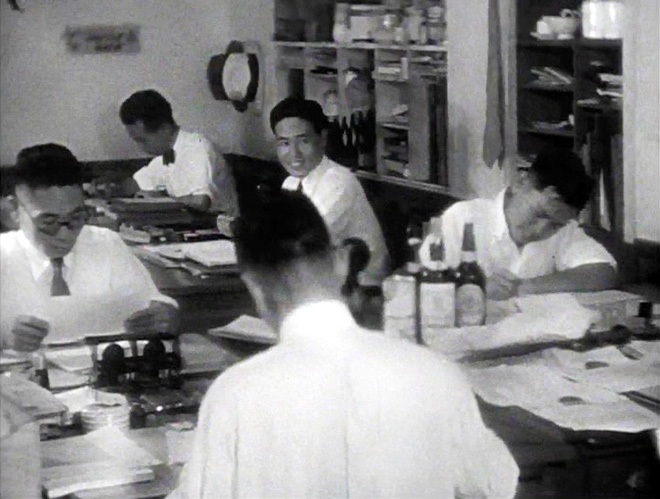
Japanese Filipinos hard at work in an office, Manila, Philippines (1930s)

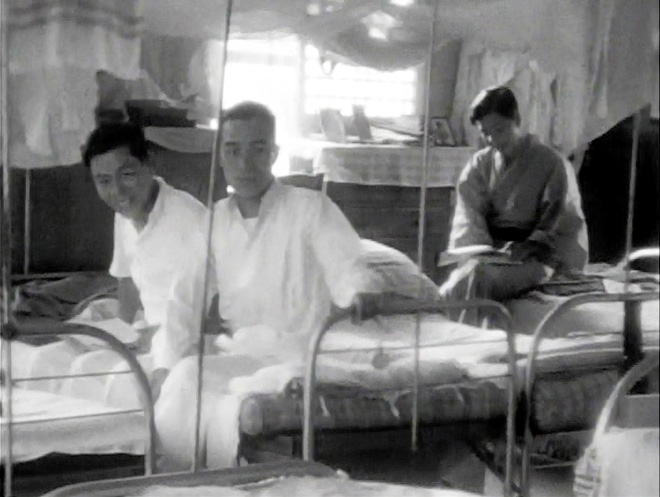
Japanese Filipinos relaxing in a dormitory, Manila, Philippines (1930s)

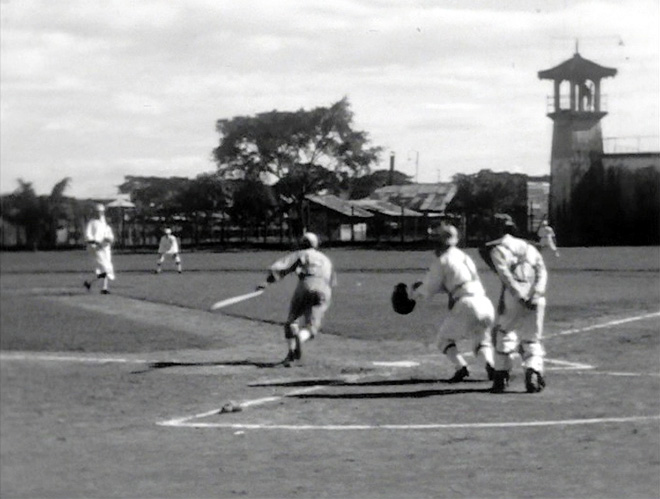
Japanese Filipinos playing baseball in Pre-War Manila, Philippines (October 1933)

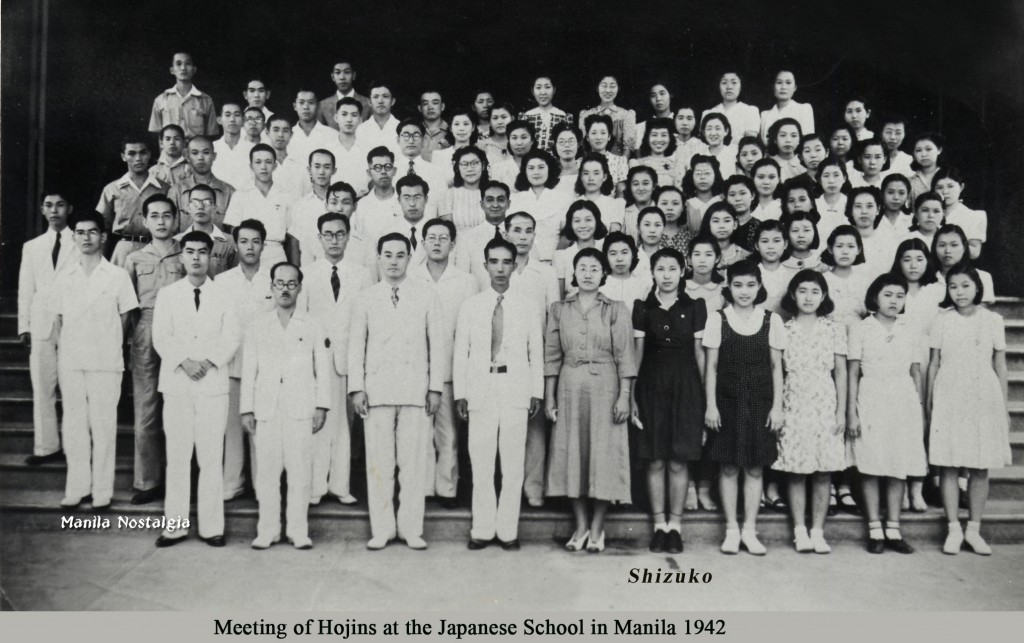
Japanese Filipino ("Hojins" 「在留邦人」) WW2 collaborators meeting at the Japanese School in Manila (1942)

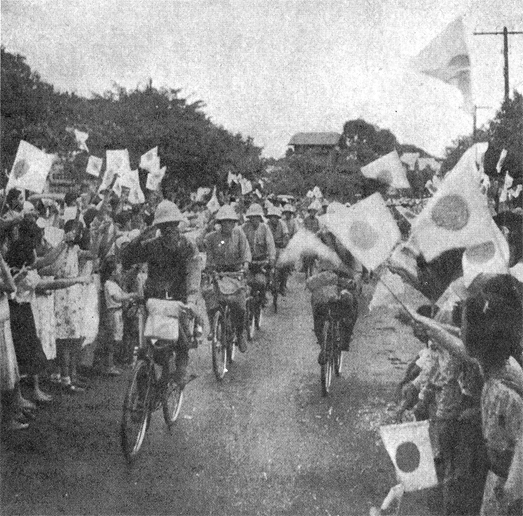
Imperial Japanese Army captures Manila on bicycle (1942)

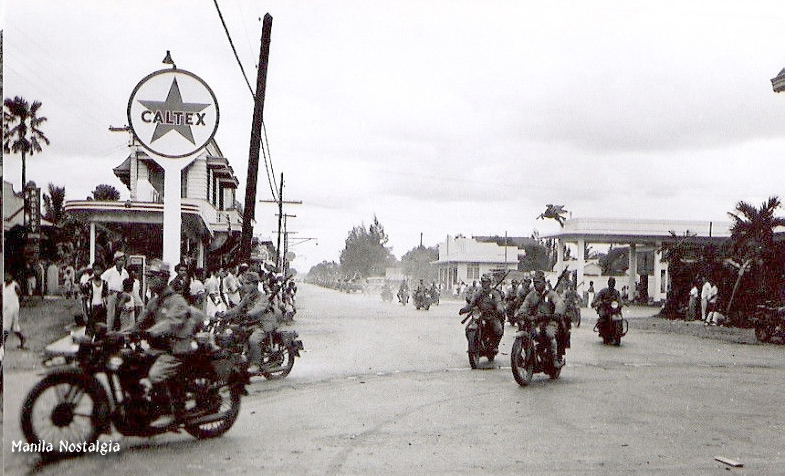
Imperial Japanese Army captures Manila on motorcycle (1942)

Japanese immigration to pre-war Philippines (1920-1930s)

Japanese soldiers in Leyte, Philippines (1945)

During the American colonial era, Japanese immigration to the Philippines increased that according to Teodoro Agoncillo that by 1939, Japanese immigrants exceeded the Chinese for the first time in Philippine history. They were very evident in Manila, and Davao where it was said to practically be a Japanese colony. During this period, Japanese laborers were also brought in to build the Benguet Road (Kennon Road) to Baguio, but eventually after the project, many moved to work in abaca plantations in Davao, where Davao soon became dubbed as Davaokuo (in Philippine and American media) or (in Japanese: 小日本國「こにっぽんこく」, romanized: Ko Nippon Koku, lit. 'Little Japan') with a Japanese school, a Shinto shrine and a diplomatic mission from Japan. The place that used to be "Little Tokyo" in Davao was around the areas of Mintal, Calinan, Tugbok. Prominent scholars and historian like Lydia Yu-Jose and Macario Tiu wrote extensively on the lively presence of Japanese migrants in pre-war Davao due to its noticeably thriving local economy predicated by a huge concentration of rubber, copra, and hemp plantations. When World War II broke out, it was reported that there were more than 21,000 Japanese residents in the Philippines with about 18,000 or more in Davao, though after the outbreak of war, the Japanese population in Davao dropped slightly. There is even a popular restaurant called "The Japanese Tunnel", which includes an actual tunnel built by the Japanese during its World War II occupation of the Philippines.

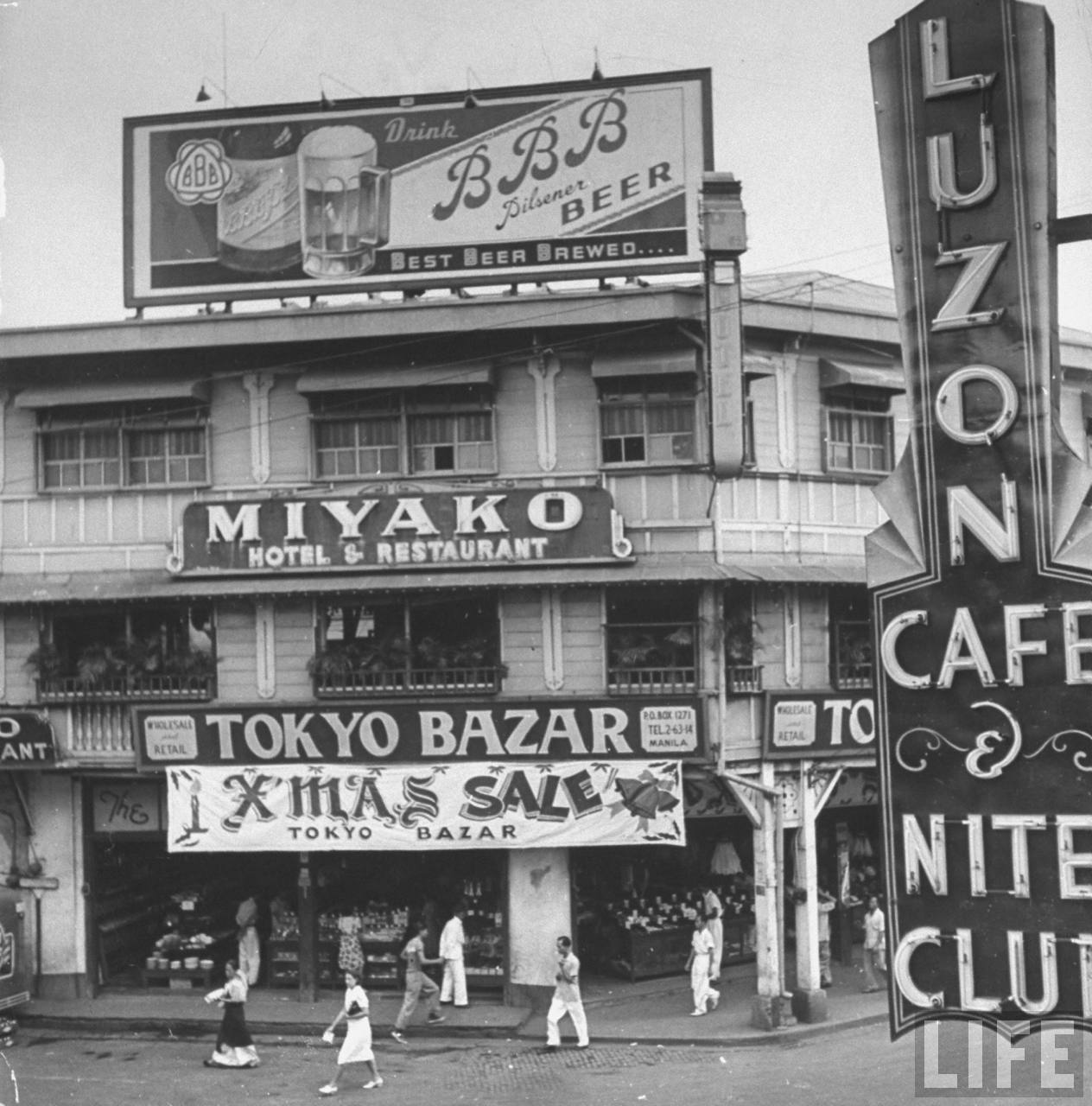
Miyako Hotel & Tokyo Bazaar, Manila, Philippines (1941)

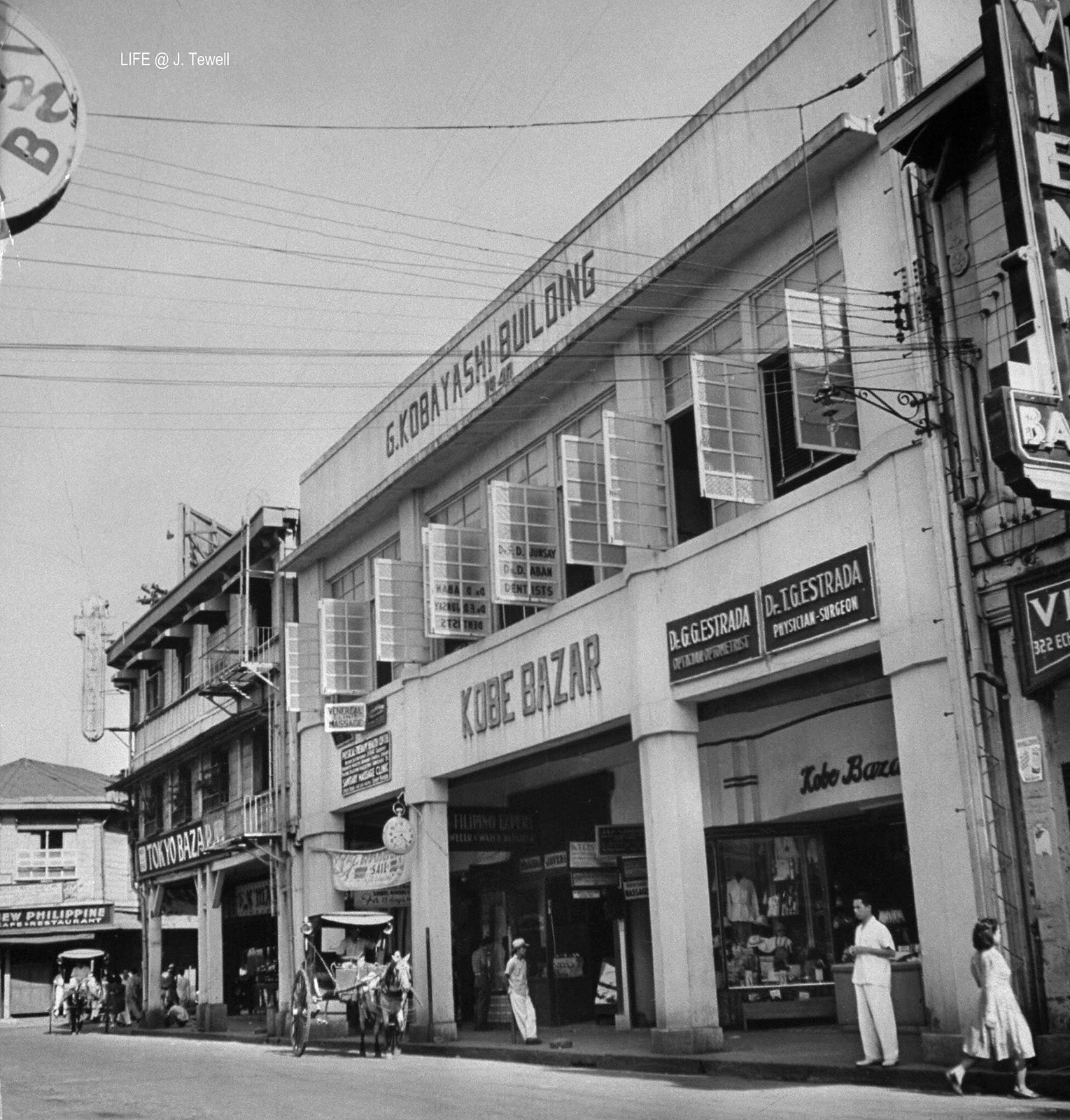
Kobe Bazaar in the G. Kobayashi Building, Manila, Philippines (1940)

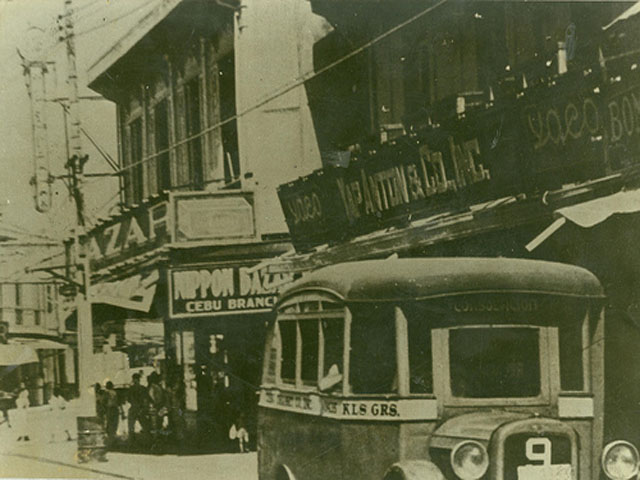
Nippon Bazaar & Yap Anton & Co., Inc., Cebu, Philippines (1930-40s)

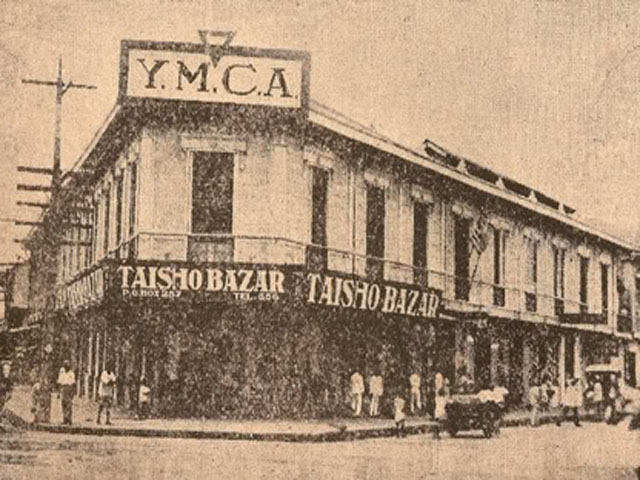
Taisho Bazaar in the YMCA Building, Cebu, Philippines (1930-40s)

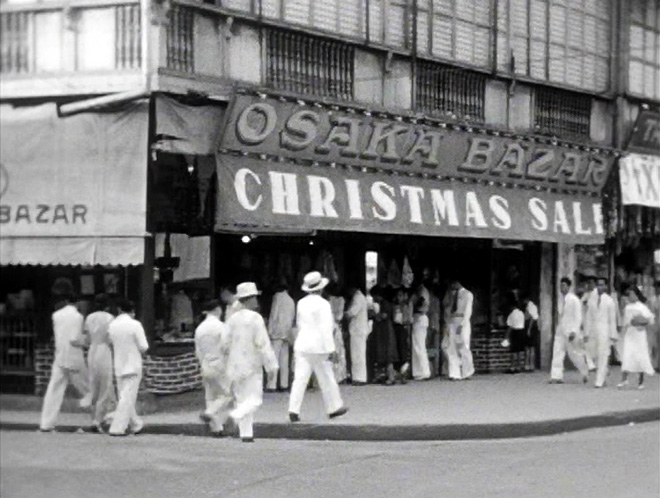
Osaka Bazaar in Manila, Philippines (1934)

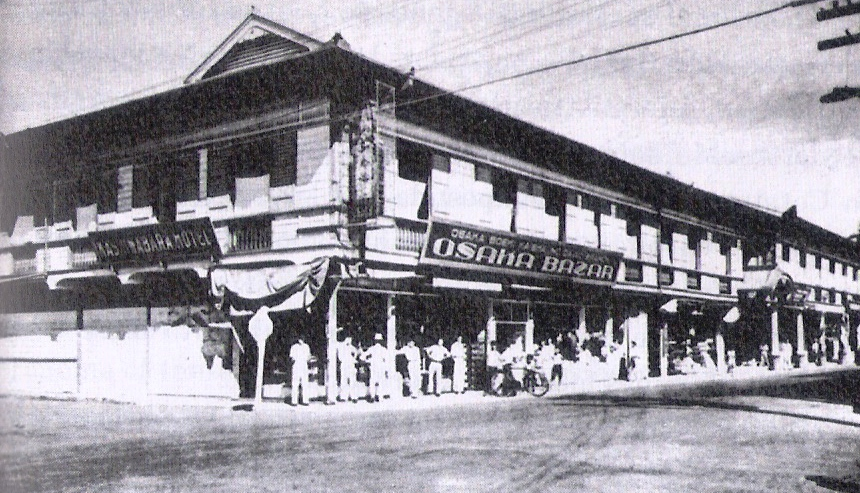
Osaka Bazaar in Davao, Philippines (1936)

Davao in Mindanao had a large population of Japanese immigrants who acted as a fifth column, welcoming the Japanese invaders during World War II. These Japanese were disliked by the Chinese and hated by the Moros. The Moros were judged as "fully capable of dealing with Japanese fifth columnists and invaders alike." The Moros were to fight the Japanese invaders when they landed at Davao on Mindanao. The Japanese went back to their ships at night to sleep since the Moros struck so much fear into them, even though the Moros were outnumbered by the Japanese. For fear of discrimination, some fled to the mountains after World War II while many others changed their names in the attempts to assimilate. Many were also killed (c. 10,000 Japanese Mestizos and Japanese) while others were deported as an act of retaliation. Some Japanese have completely lost their Japanese identity while others have "returned" to Japan, the homeland of their forebears. There is also a number of contemporary Japanese-mestizos, not associated with the history of the earlier established ones, born either in the Philippines or Japan. These latter are the resultant of unions between Filipinos and recent Japanese immigrants to the Philippines or Japanese and immigrant Filipino workers in Japan. Most Japanese mestizos speak Tagalog and/or other Philippine languages. They may also be known as Japinos, although this term is considered derogatory by many. There are believed to be between 100,000 and 200,000 Japanese-mestizos in the country, but no accurate figure is currently available. Thousands of war-displaced ethnic Japanese still live in the country and are denied recognition as Japanese nationals in order to return to Japan.

=== Modern times ===
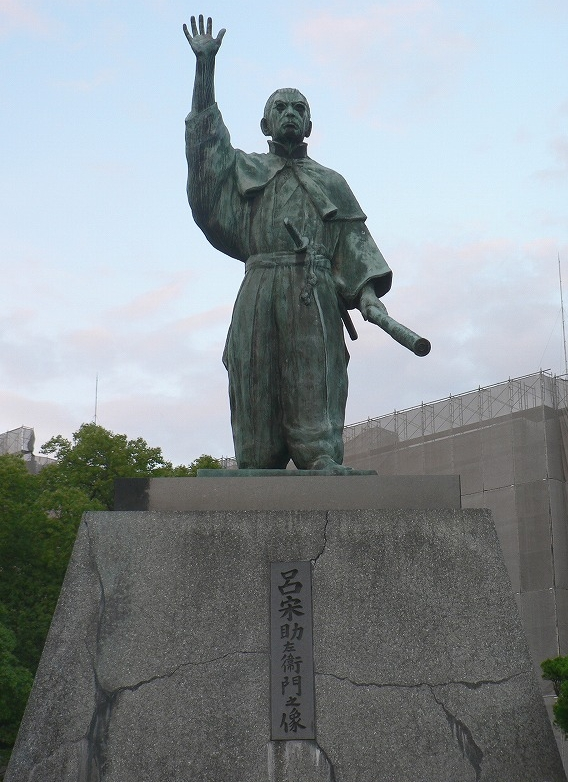
Statue of Luzon Sukezaemon at Sakai Citizens' Hall, Sakai, Japan

The recent Japanese Filipinos are descendants of 1980s and 1990s Japanese settlers usually businesspeople, most of whom are men, and (mostly female) locals. Many are children of thousands of overseas Filipino workers, who went to Japan mostly as entertainers. They are in the Philippines also to learn English. As the Filipina mothers return to the Philippines, most take their children along with them. A significant number in the U.S. today are the product of Filipino- and Japanese American intermarriages, mostly in California, Hawaii, or other U.S. states, or other U.S. territories in the Pacific, while others are Filipinos of Japanese ancestry who have migrated to the United States.

Several foundations today such as the Federation of Nikkeijin Kai Philippines & Manila Nikkeijin Kai exist throughout the country through the efforts of prosperous Japanese descendants and expatriates to assist Filipinos of Japanese ancestry to travel in Japan to trace their roots and visit relatives, and also charity purposes such as offering Long Term Resident visa and educational scholarships to out of school Japanese Filipino children. Similar organizations exist in the Philippines to commemorate and signify the historical settlement of Japanese Filipinos in the region. The Philippines also has the highest number of Japanese in the country than any other Southeast Asian country.

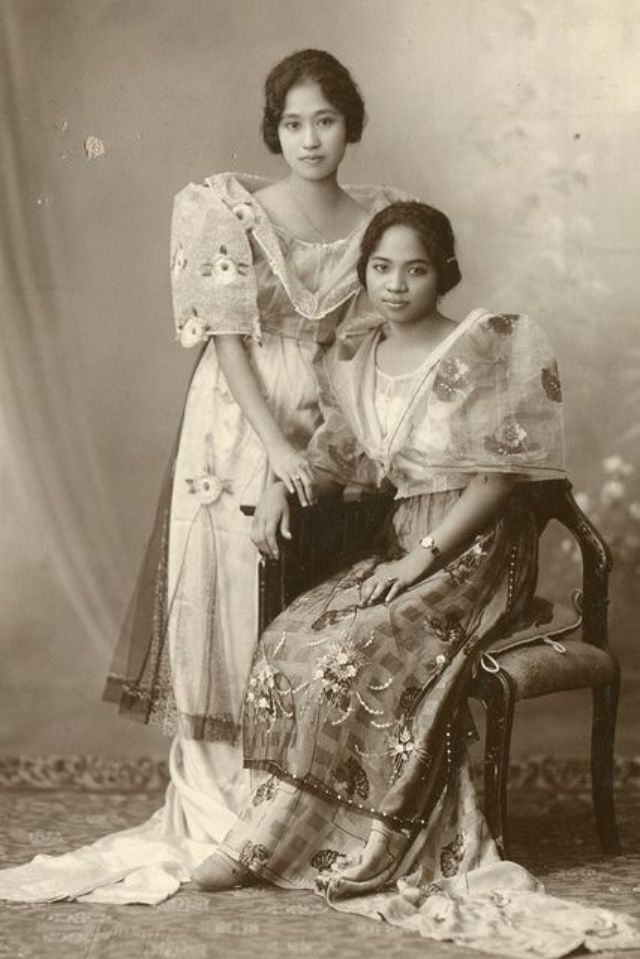
Japanese Filipina woman (left) wearing terno gowns (1920)

=== Japanese citizenship ===
On June 4, 2008, the Supreme Court of Japan ruled against a law denying citizenship to children born out of wedlock to Japanese fathers and foreign mothers. It upheld separate 2003 and 2005 suits (of 10 Japanese-Filipino children for Japanese citizenship), filed by Filipino mothers who proved the fathers of their children were Japanese. It affirmed the Tokyo District Court judgment that "the marital status of the parents had no bearing on nationality, and that denying the children citizenship violated constitutional guarantees of equality for all." Mel Nuqui, executive director of the Development Action for Women Network (DAWN), stated that the "30-year migration of Filipino entertainers to Japan produced 100,000 Japanese-Filipino children," but very few children were legally acknowledged by their Japanese fathers. DAWN assists Filipino entertainers and Japanese-Filipinos, by helping Japanese-Filipinos locate their fathers in Japan. In 2007, it called for registration of Japanese-Filipinos, and 1,313 Japanese-Filipinos in the Philippines registered (August to October in 2007). However, only 60 of the 1,313 children had been registered in Japan, and of 2,800 children (born out of wedlock from foreign mothers who reside in Japan), 2,000 had Japanese fathers.

== Education ==
- The Manila Japanese School, a Japanese international school, is located in Bonifacio Global City, Metro Manila.
- The Cebu Japanese School is a supplementary program for Japanese children in Mandaue City, Cebu.
- The Mindanao Kokusai Daigaku (Mindanao International College) and the Philippine Nikkei Jin Kai International School offer Japanese language education in Davao City.

== Notable people ==
- Dominic Panganiban - YouTuber, animator, and cartoonist.
- BGen. Eric C. Uchida - brigade commander of the 301st Infantry Brigade
- Carlos B. Teraoka - Honorary Consul-General of Japan (1995-2005) and Chairman of the Filipino-Japanese Foundation of Northern Luzon
- Naitō Joan – A Christian Samurai / Lord who was banished to Manila after the Shogunate's anti-christian edict of 1614 (Originally from Japan)
- Naitō Julia – A woman catechist who was banished to Manila after the Shogunate's anti-christian edict of 1614 (Originally from Japan)
- Vic Diaz and Vic Silayan - two classic veteran actors who portrayed their roles as a Japanese Imperial Army officers in World War II movies.
- Fumiya Sankai – vlogger (Originally from Hamamatsu, Shizuoka, Japan)
- Aiko Melendez – actress and former politician.
- Hikaru Minegishi – footballer who plays mainly as a winger for Ceres–Negros of the Philippines Football League (Originally from Sendai, Miyagi, Japan)
- Dom Justo Takayama - Kirishitan daimyo and samurai (Originally from Uda, Nara, Japan)
- Jiro Manio – former actor
- Nina Kodaka – TV personality, host, actress & pianist who gained media attention as a finalist on the 5th season of StarStruck, a reality-TV talent show broadcast on GMA Network (Originally from Tokyo, Japan)
- Satoshi Ōtomo – footballer who most recently played for Davao Aguilas in the Philippines Football League (Originally from Sakae, Chiba, Japan)
- Sayaka Akimoto – actress and singer who was a member of the Japanese idol girl group AKB48.
- Alan Shirahama – performer, actor and DJ (Originally from Matsuyama, Ehime Prefecture, Japan)
- Megumi Nakajima - voice actress and singer (Originally from (Mito, Ibaraki, Japan)
- Loveli – fashion model and television personality (Originally from Matsuyama, Ehime Prefecture, Japan)
- Akihiro Sato – Japanese Brazilian model based in Philippines.
- Anja Aguilar – recording artist and Grand Winner of Little Big Star Season 2 in 2006.
- Gerphil Flores - classical crossover singer.
- Tomohiko Hoshina – judoka (Originally from Shizuoka, Shizuoka, Japan)
- Iwa Moto – actress, model and reality television personality.
- Maybelline Masuda - jiu-jitsu practitioner.
- Daniel Matsunaga – model, actor, professional footballer, host and businessman who became known in the Philippines by appearing in Cosmopolitan Philippines’ September 2009 "Cosmo Men" supplement. Born Japanese-Brazilian, obtained Filipino citizenship.
- Hikaru Minegishi – footballer who plays mainly as a winger for Ceres–Negros of the Philippines Football League (Originally from Sendai, Miyagi, Japan)
- Kintaro Miyagi – footballer who plays for the UP Fighting Maroons (Originally from Tokyo, Japan)
- Artemio Murakami - professional golfer.
- Kodo Nakano – judoka (Originally from Noda, Iwate, Japan)
- Enrique Ona – surgeon and public servant.
- Satoshi Ōtomo – footballer who most recently played for Davao Aguilas in the Philippines Football League (Originally from Sakae, Chiba, Japan)
- Ramon 'Bong' Revilla, Jr. - actor, producer, and politician
- Ramon 'Jolo' Revilla III. - actor, politician
- Efren Reyes Jr. - actor and director
- Efren Reyes Sr. - classic veteran actor and director
- Vic Vargas - classic veteran actor
- Taki Saito – actress (Originally from Fukuoka Prefecture, Japan)
- Risa Sato – volleyball player (Originally from Osaka, Japan)
- Yuka Saso – professional golfer of Japanese descent. She created golf history for the Philippines by winning the 2021 U.S. Women's Open.
- Daisuke Sato – professional footballer
- Edgar Sia – businessman founder of Mang Inasal fastfood chain, his mother is a Japanese Filipina named Pacita Jaruda.
- Akiko Thomson – television host, journalist and retired swimmer.
- Kiyomi Watanabe - judoka who has represented the Philippines in international competitions.
- Michiko Yamamoto – screenwriter.
- Mokomichi Hayami – actor, chef, TV presenter, entrepreneur, and model (Originally from Shibuya-ku, Tokyo, Japan)
- Maria Ozawa – actress, model and a former AV star (Originally from Hokkaido, Japan)
- Kaede Ishiyama – MNL48 idol.
- Mara Lopez – actress and surfer.
- Fabio Ide – actor and model.
- Anthonny Iinuma – former contestant of Produce 101 Japan S2 and Boys Planet. (born from Davao City)
- Ako Kamo – Miss Universe Japan 2019 (Originally from Kobe, Hyogo, Japan)
- Miho Hoshino – MNL48 idol.
- Kaori Oinuma – actress and Pinoy Big Brother: Otso winner (Originally from Nagoya, Aichi, Japan)
- Junna Tsukii - mixed martial arist, former karateka
- Ramon Tulfo, Wanda Tulfo Teo, Ben Tulfo, Raffy Tulfo and Erwin Tulfo - their mother is a Japanese Filipina named Caridad Teshiba
- Akira Morishita - actor, singer, and member of BGYO
- Angel Satsumi - teen actress, known as Clarissa in Pepito Manaloto
- Tsuyoshi Anthony "Hori" Horibata - First district representative of Camarines Sur (2022–)
- Kazel Kinouchi - actress, known as Zoey in Abot-Kamay na Pangarap
- Masumi - vocalist, sole member of Friday Night Plans
- Syuri Kondo - professional wrestler, shoot boxer, kickboxer and mixed martial artist (Originally from Ebina, Kanagawa, Japan)

== See also ==
- Red seal ships
- Filipinos in Japan
- Japan–Philippines relations
- Japanese diaspora
- Immigration to the Philippines
