= Jusay Ancestral House =

Historic house in Manila

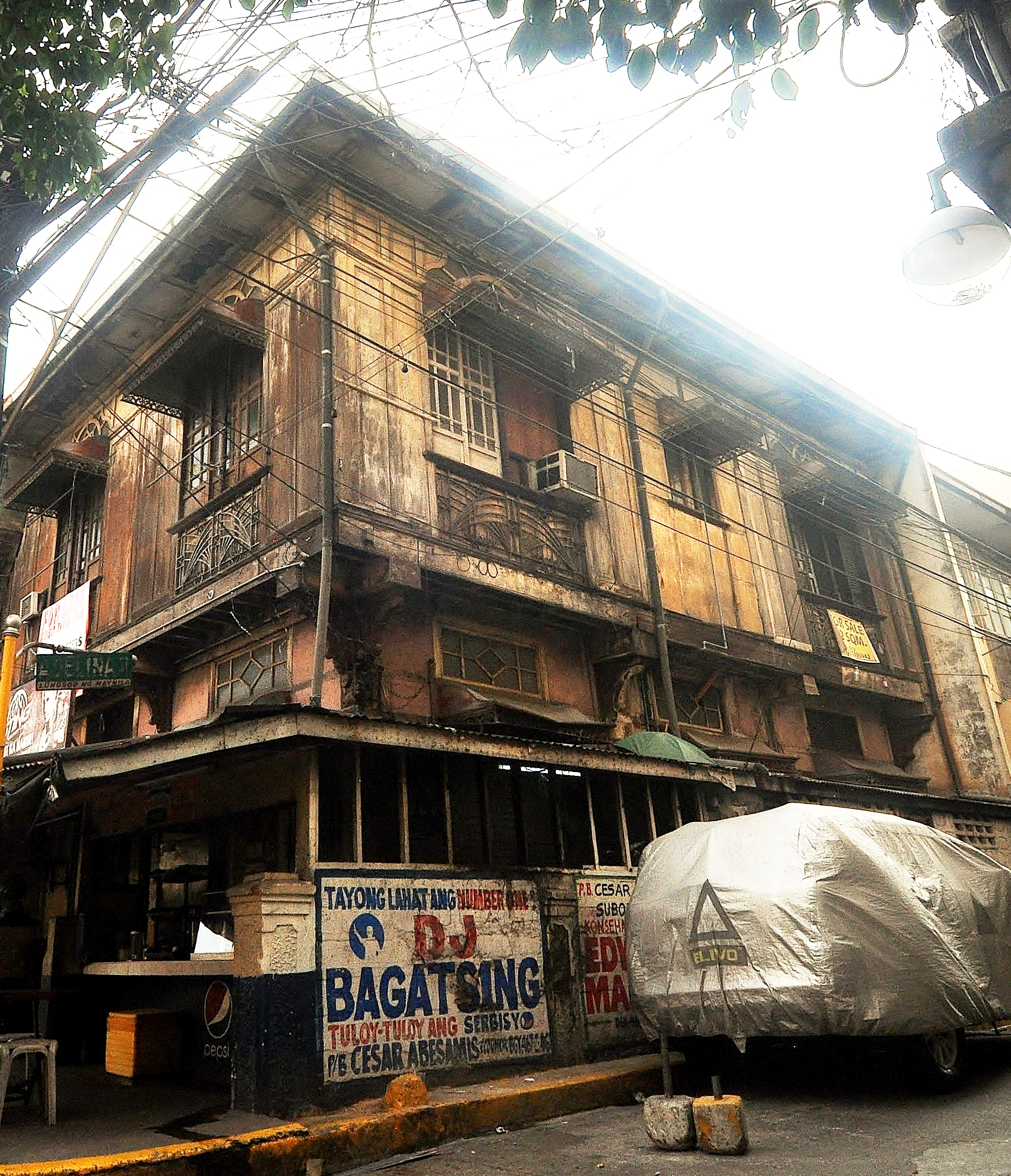
- A 2-point View of the Jusay Ancestral House
- Interactive map of the Jusay Ancestral House area

General information
- Architectural style: Bahay na Bato
- Location: Adelina St. and Delos Reyes St., Sampaloc, in Manila, Philippines
- Coordinates: 14°36′25.34″N 120°59′15.29″E
- Construction started: Early 1920s

The Jusay Ancestral House is a historic house located in the Sampaloc neighborhood of Manila, in the Philippines. It was originally the home of the late couple Dr. Fernando Jusay and Rustica Palma which was eventually passed on to their late son Jose Jusay (born on June 24, 1944). The house was also called "The Door House" because it has so many doors inside. It was built in the early 1920s and its interiors as well as the exteriors are made of narra (Pterocarpus indicus) wood. Galvanized iron sheet was used as roofing and the wall found outside the house is made of cement. According to the wife of the late Jose Jusay, Melody Urbano-Jusay, the two-storey house used to have five rooms, two bathrooms, dirty kitchen and a kitchen at the second floor and a basement with a secret passage which is now covered with cement due to road elevations that took place throughout the years.

== History ==
The house was built after one of the members of the Jusay Family won 100,000 pesos in a sweepstakes raffle draw during the 1920s. According to Melody Urbano-Jusay, part of the prize was spent to fund the building of the house which costed 18,000 pesos during that time.

During the Second World War, Sinforosio Jusay and wife Elena Chavez-Jusay (pregnant with Jose Jusay) temporarily left the house and fled to Lucena. The house was then used as a headquarter by the Japanese high officials. After the Japanese defeat to the Americans, the American officials also made it as their headquarter for a short period of time. Then the Jusay family went back to their house in Manila when the Americans left their house.

In 1960's, there was a fire that broke out within the area but the house was not destroyed.

== Present Day ==
The heiress, Melody Jusay, is planning to sell the house after completing all the necessary documentary requirements. Due to lack of funds, the house cannot be fully restored back to its previous glory. The eastern part of the house was converted to an eatery, for income-generating purposes.

== Gallery ==
Jusay Ancestral House
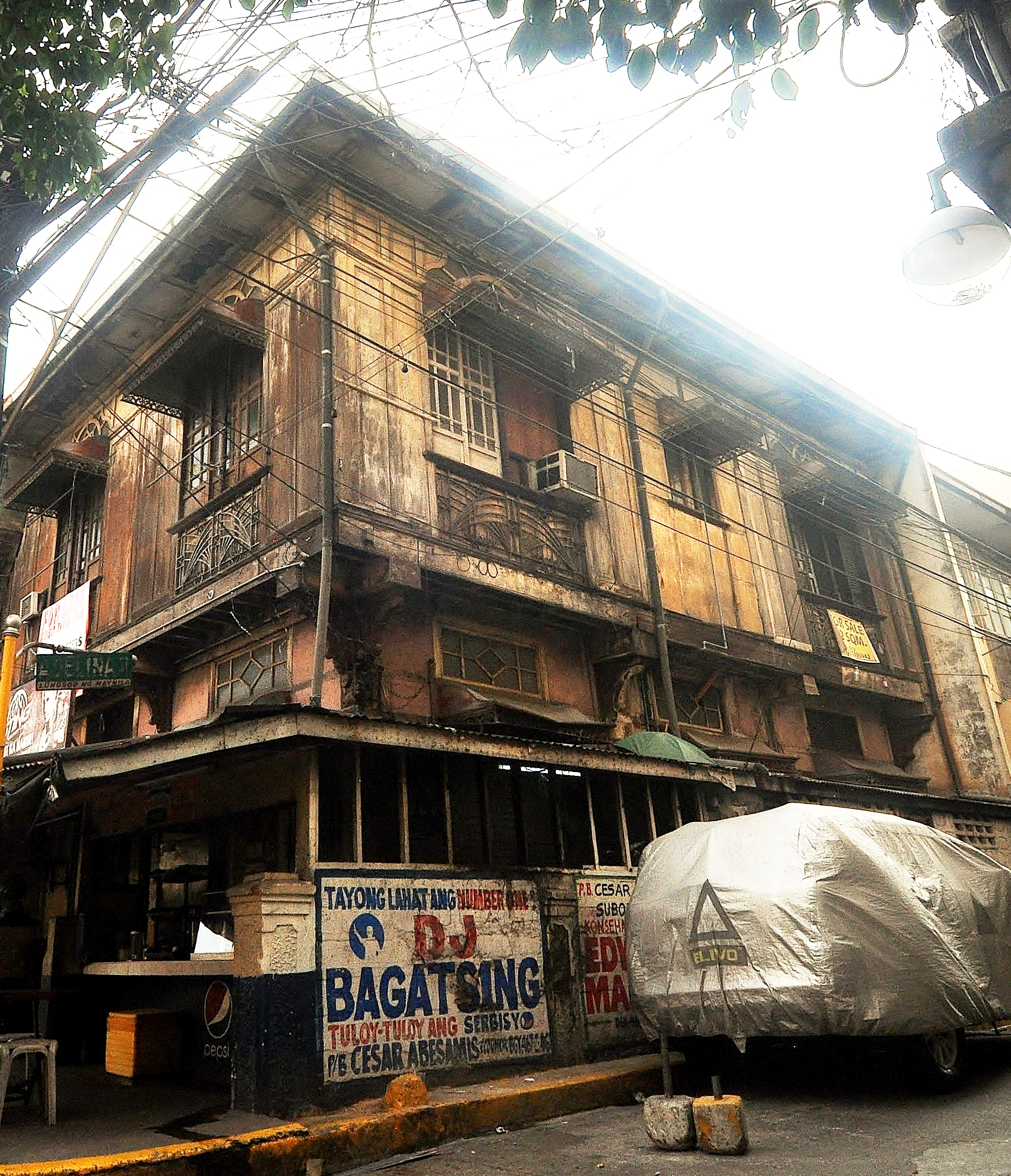
Jusay Ancestral House

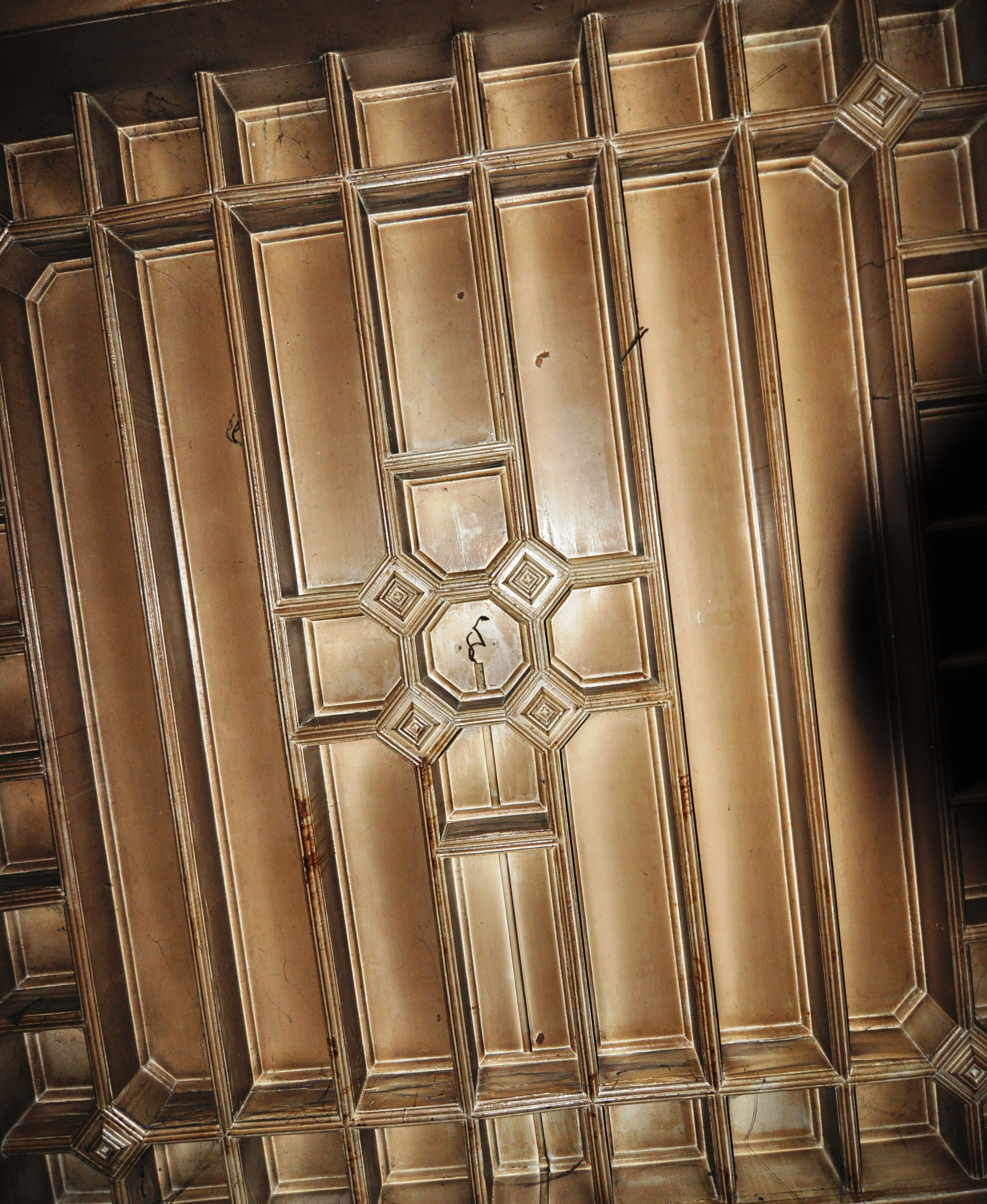
Ceiling Details 1

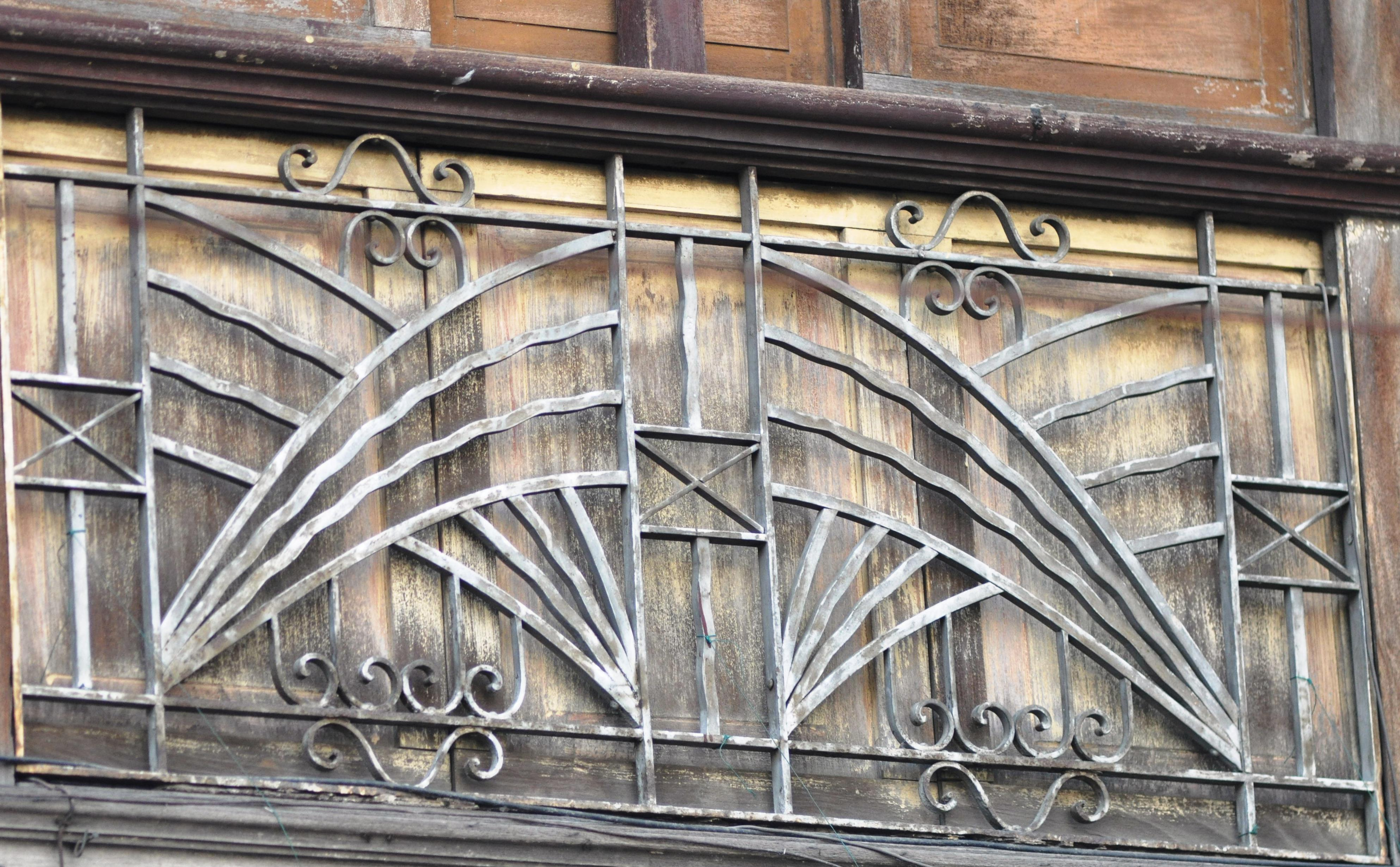
Window Design (Lower portion)

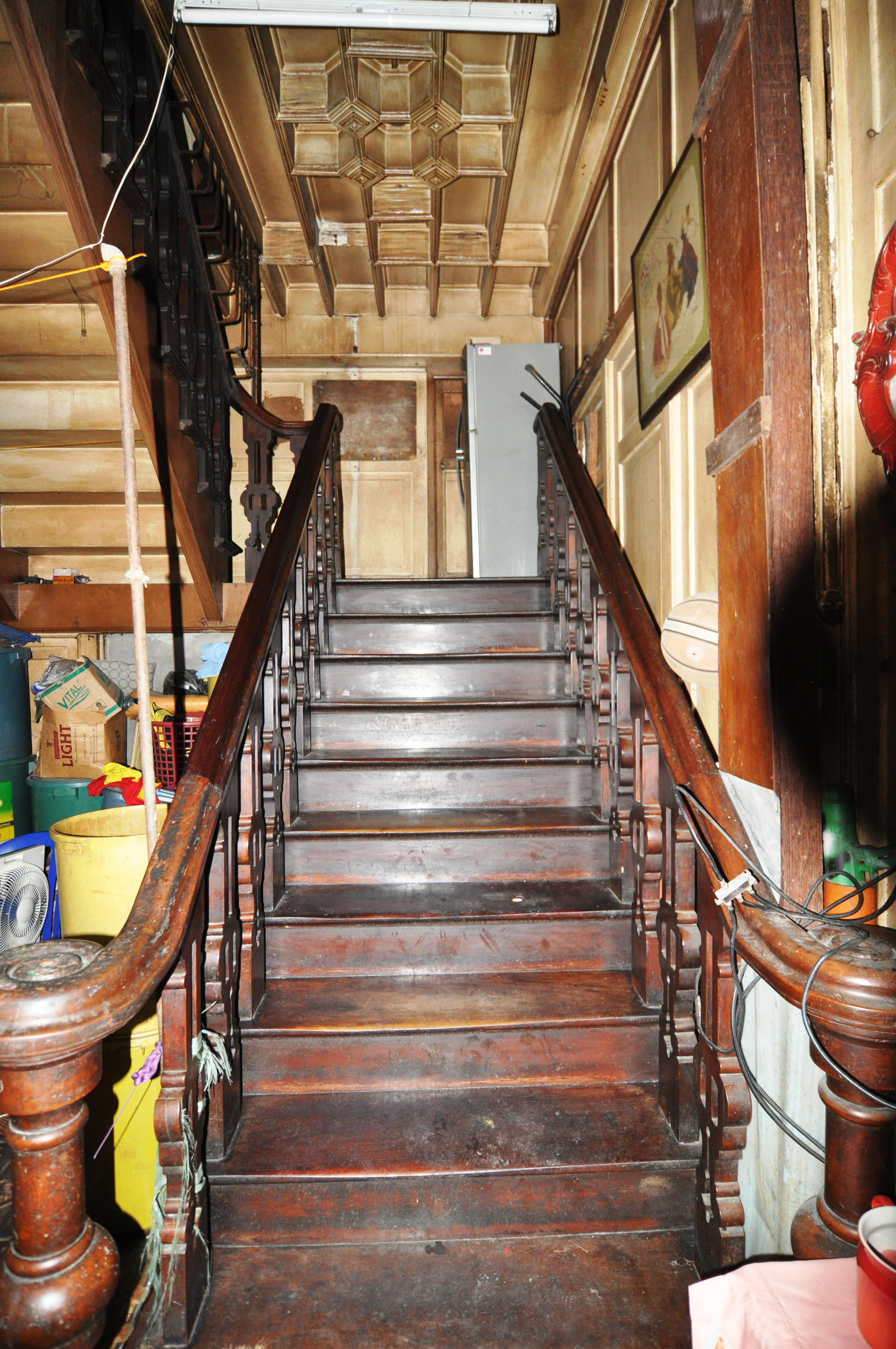
Stairs

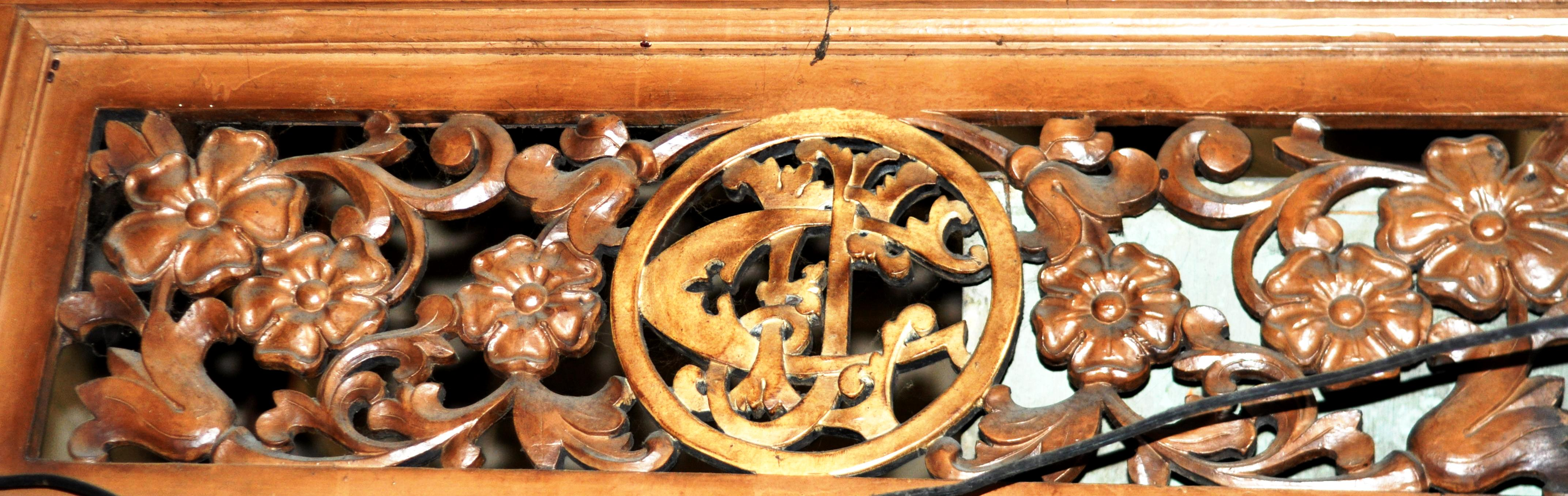
Wall Design 2

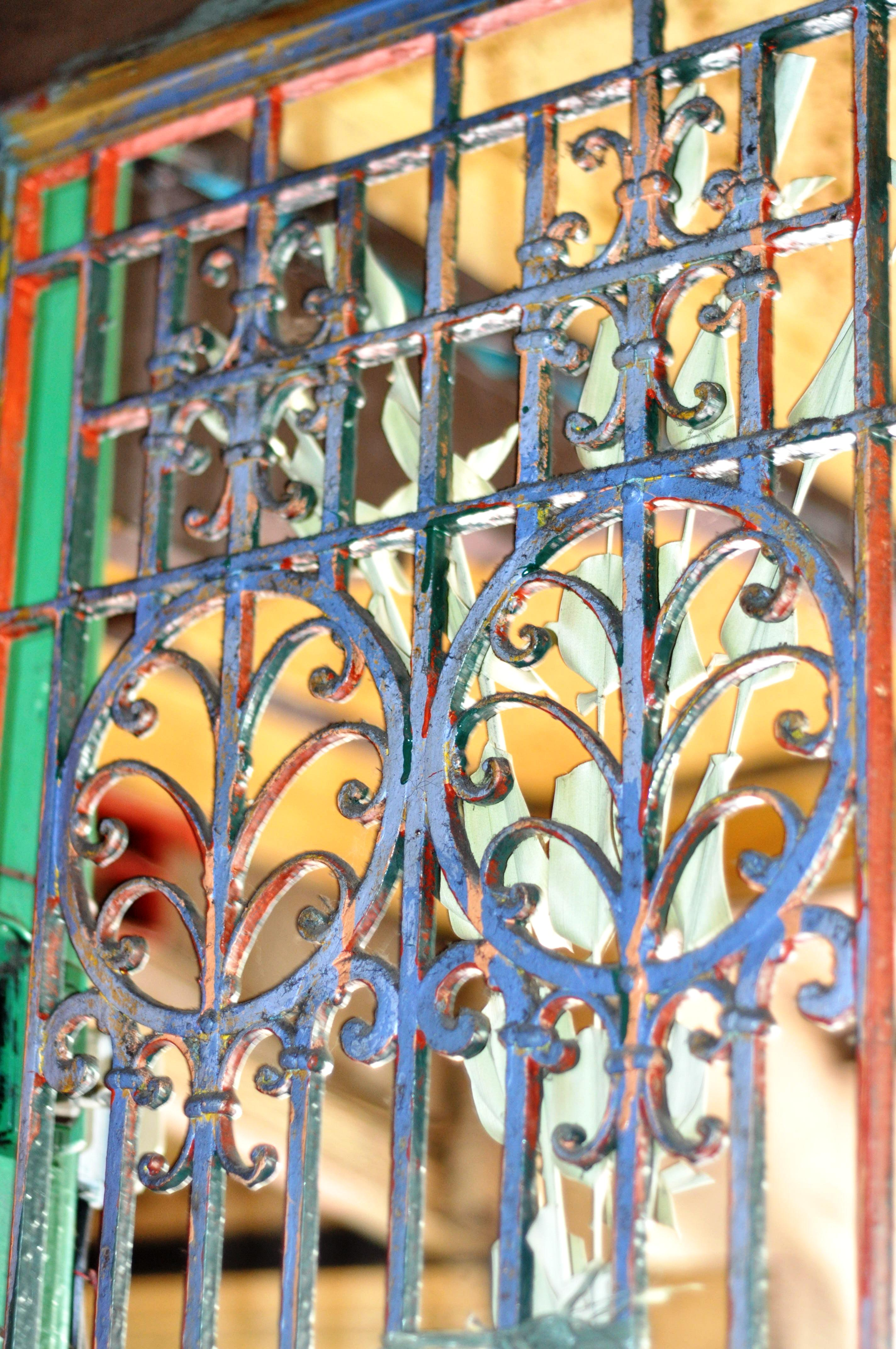
Window Design

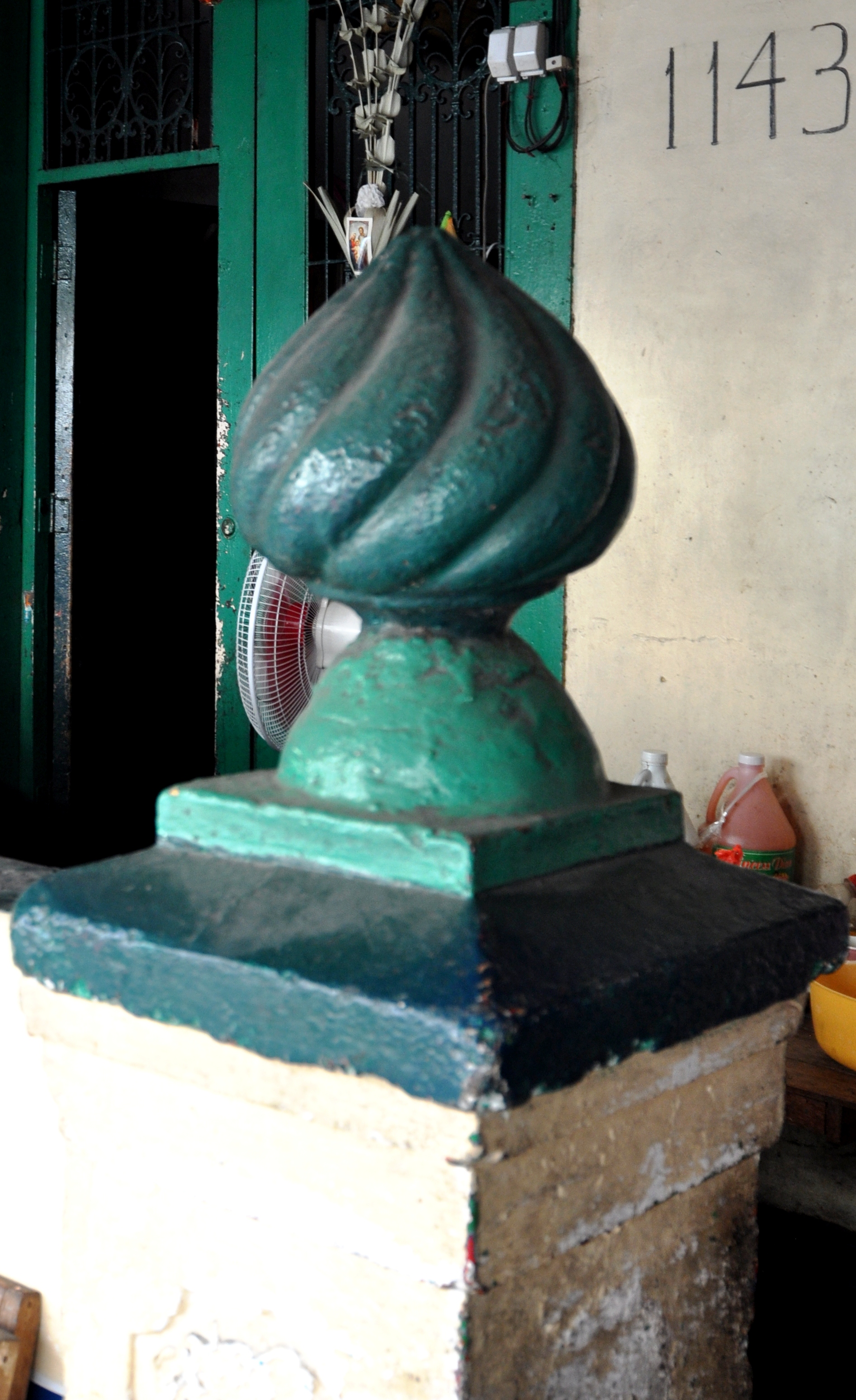
Veranda Design

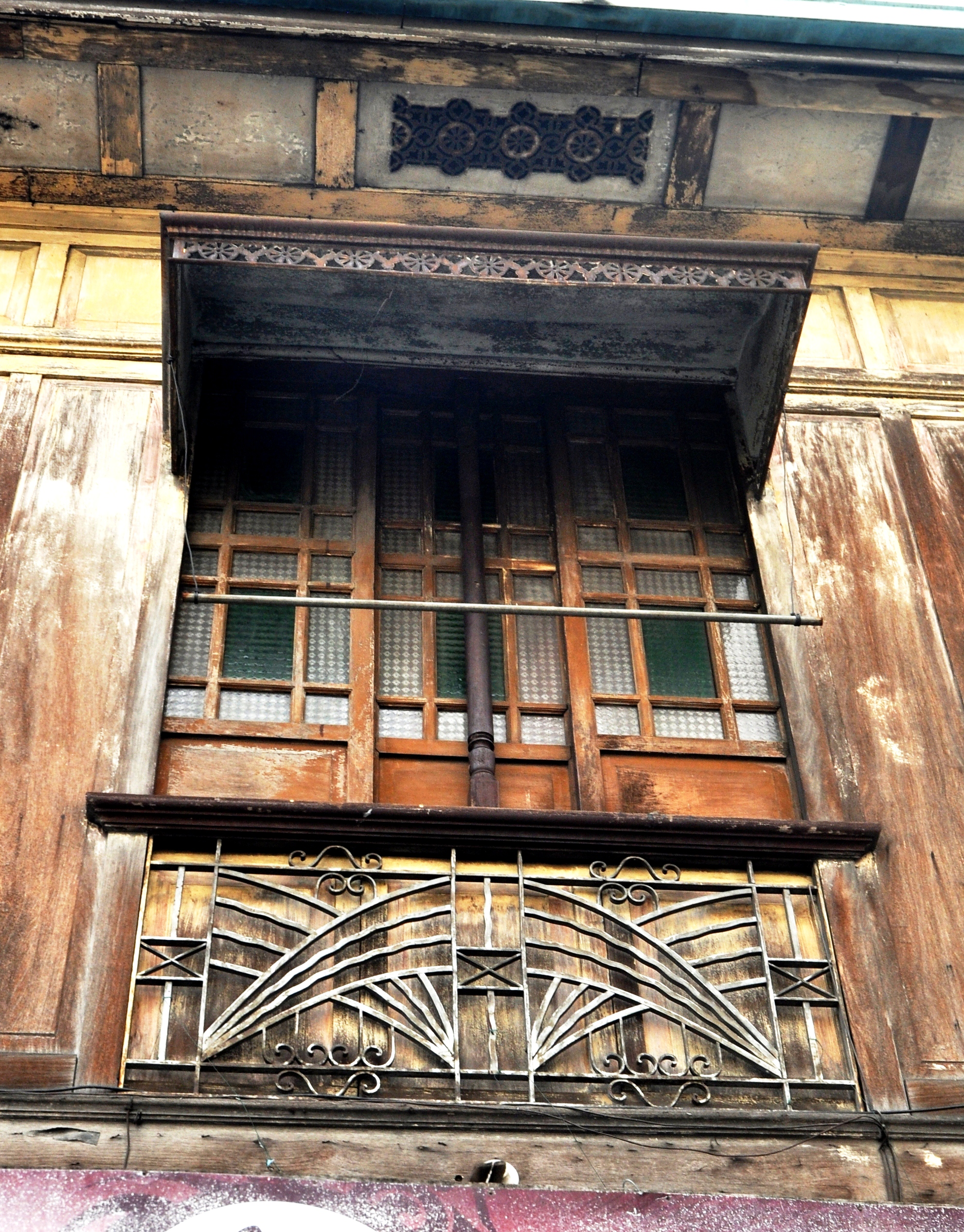
Window Details

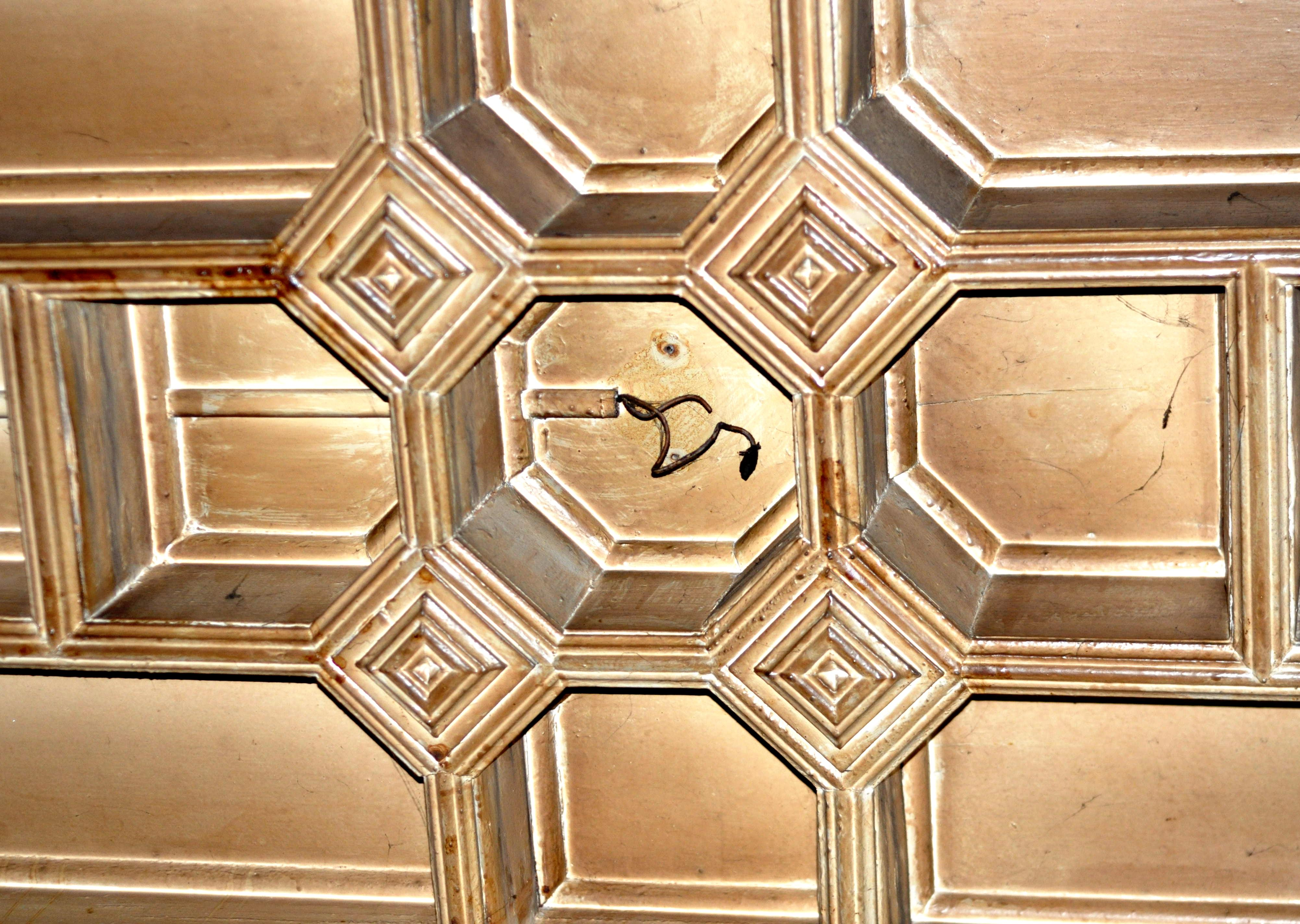
Ceiling Design 2

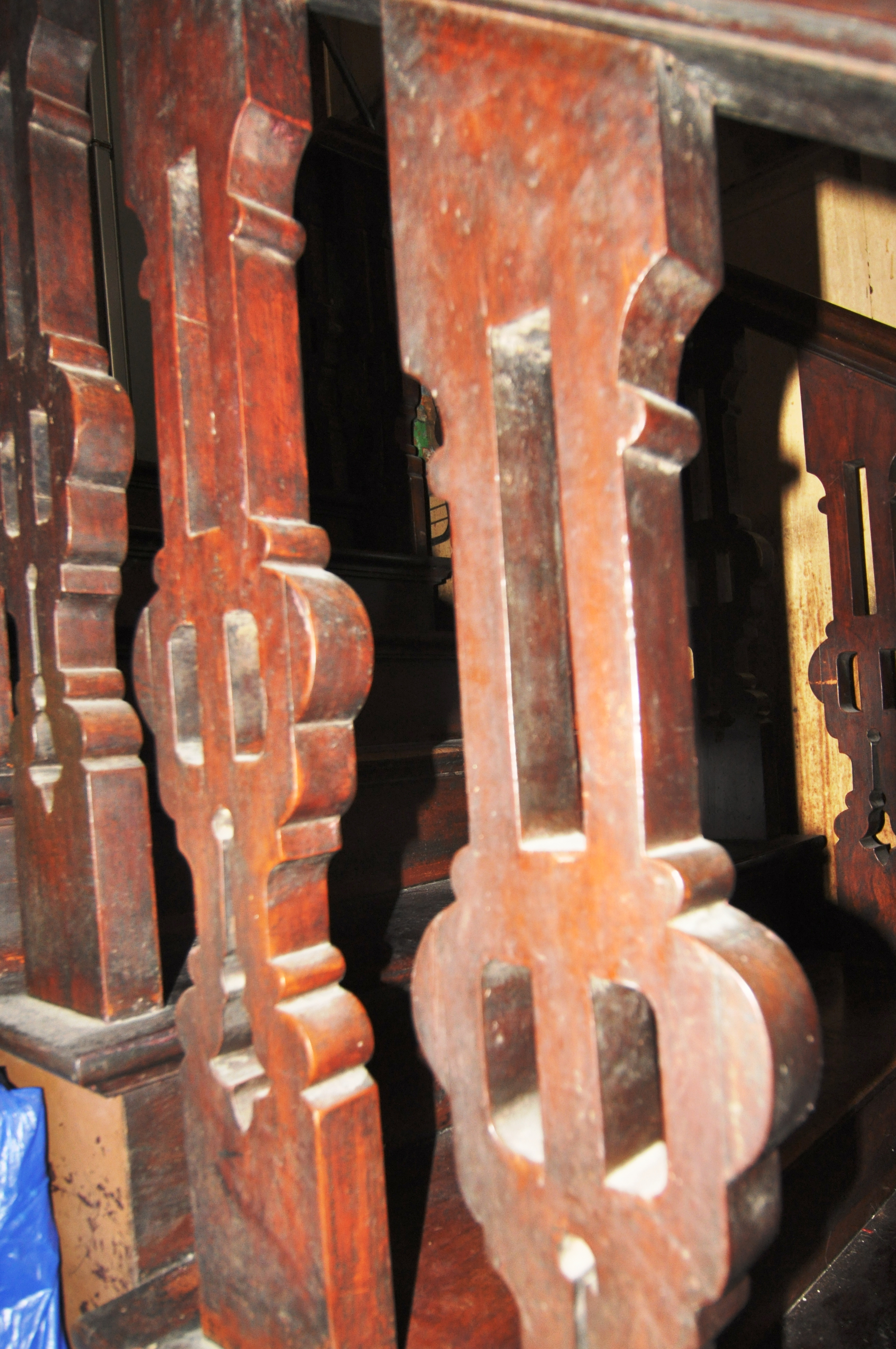
Stairs Design Details

== See also ==
- Ancestral houses of the Philippines

== Sources ==
- Interview with Melody Urbano-Jusay, May 3, 2014
- Short video interview with Melody Urbano-Jusay, May 3, 2014
- Short video interview with Melody Urbano-Jusay, May 3, 2014
