= Naitō clan =

Japanese samurai kin group

Naitō 内藤
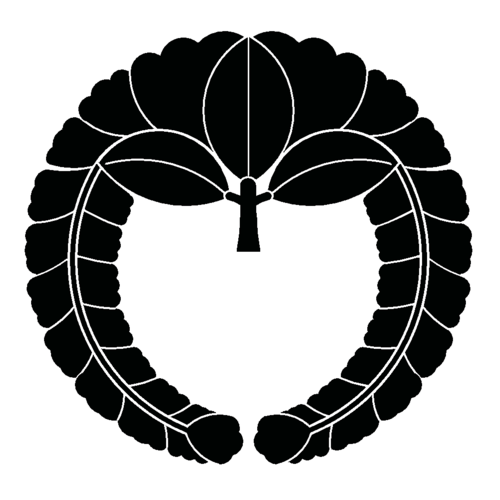
- Crest of the Naito clan

Naitō clan (内藤氏, Naitō-shi) is a Japanese samurai kin group. The clan claims its descent from Fujiwara no Hidesato. The Naitō became daimyōs during the Edo period.

== History ==
Under the leadership of Naitō Ienaga (1546–1600), vassal of Tokugawa Ieyasu, in 1590 he was given the Domain of Sanuki (Kazusa Province – 20,000 koku). After Ienaga's death, Naitō Masanaga (1568–1634) succeed him. For his services in Siege of Osaka (1615), he saw his income was 50,000 koku, and then he was transferred to the Iwakidaira Domain (Mutsu Province – 70,000 koku) in 1622. Transferred in 1747 to the Nobeoka Domain (Hyuga Prefecture – 70,000 koku), the Clan remained there until the Meiji Restoration when the Clan leader became a Shishaku (viscount) in the new Kazoku system.

== Clan Lords ==
The Clan suffered several divisions giving rise to the following Branches:

- A branch was established in the Domain of Unagaya (1670–1868) (Mutsu Province – 14,000 koku). Shishaku.
- A branch was established in the Domain of Izumi (Province of Mutsu) in 1628, later it controls the Domain of Annaka (Province of Kozuke) in 1702 and then, in 1748–1868 the Domain of Koromo (Province of Mikawa – 20,000 koku). Shishaku ..
- The Nobinari Branch was originated by Naitō Nobunari (1545–1612). The son Tokugawa Hirotada and Tokugawa Ieyasu's half-brother who was adopted by Naitō Kiyonaga. He served Ieyasu and, in 1590, when he conquered Nirayama Castle (Izu Province), belonging to the Go-Hōjō Clan, receiving in exchange the Domain of Nirayama with an income of 10,000 koku. In 1601, it was transferred to Sunpu Domain (Suruga Province – 30,000 koku), and in 1606, to Nagahama Domain (Omi Province – 50,000 koku). After his death, this Branch came to live: in 1628 in the Domain of Tanakura (Mutsu Province); in 1705 in the Domain of Tanaka (Suruga Province), and finally between 1720–1868 in Domain of Murakami (Province of Echigo – 50,000 koku).
1. Naitō Nobunari (1564–1612)
2. Naitō Nobumasa (1612–1626)
3. Naitō Nobuteru (1626–1665)
4. Naitō Nobuyoshi) (1665–1695)
5. Naitō Kazunobu (1695–1725)
6. Naitō Nobuteru (1725–1725)
7. Naitō Nobuoki (1725–1761)
8. Naitō Nobuaki (1761–1762)
9. Naitō Nobu (1762–1781)
10. Naitō Nobuatsu (1781–1825)
11. Naitō Nobuchika (1825–1864)
12. Naitō Nobutami (1864–1868)
13. Naitō Nobuyoshi (1868–1871)
- A branch was established in the Takatō Domain (Shinano Province – 33,000 koku). Shishaku.
- A branch was established in the Iwamurata Domain (Shinano Province 1693–1868, – 15,000 koku). Shishaku.
- A branch was established in the Domain of Sano (Shimotsuke Prefecture) in 1626, then went to the Domain of Toba (Shima Prefecture – 32,000 koku) in 1634.

== Notable members ==
- Naitō Julia (1566–1627), a Christian convert, she became one of the most prominent Catholic leaders during the Sengoku and early Edo periods, creating a large group of women catechists.
- Naitō Joan (1626), a Christian samurai, he was banned from Japan because of his Christian faith. He and his sister, Naito Julia, were banished to the Philippines.
