= Naitō Julia =

Japanese noble lady & catechist (1566–1627)

Naitō Julia (内藤 ジュリア, 1566 - 28 March 1627) was a Japanese noblewoman and religious leader from the Sengoku period to the early Edo period. Julia was among several prominent Catholics, along with Kyogoku Maria and other women catechists, who strongly resisted oppressions imposed on Christianity. She faced the rule of samurai governments, staying true to her missionary campaigns even when Christianity was banned in Japan.

== Life ==
Julia's birth name is not known, save that her mother was from the Naitō clan and her father from the Matsunaga clan. She was born in 1566 to Matsunaga Nagayori, who was the brother of Matsunaga Hisahide. Her mother was the daughter of Naitō Sadafusa (内藤 定房) of Yagi castle in Tanba province. Her father died when her brother, Naitō Joan, was a child and his position as heir to Yagi castle seems to have been unstable. She was married, but her husband died when she was 22, and so she was cloistered as a Buddhist nun.

In 1595, she was baptised a Christian and took the name "Julia", thirty years after her brother had converted. She was a part of missionary work centered in Kyoto, interacting with the wives and consorts of many daimyō, converting Gohime (Ukita Hideie's wife and Toyotomi Hideyoshi's daughter) and others to Christianity.

At first, Christians were relatively accepted on Japanese territory, but the situation changed once Hideyoshi reunited Japan given external threats including European expansionism in East Asia. This persecution of Christians led Japan to a great conflict, as many daimyō and powerful lords were Christians, thus dividing their opinions about Hideyoshi. This war between Catholic missionaries and Buddhist lords led to the Twenty-six Martyrs of Japan incident. Several missionaries were executed, thus putting Naitō Julia in a risky position, but she remained faithful to Catholicism and continued her missionary campaigns with a large group of women.

In 1606, six years after the Battle of Sekigahara, she organized a convent-like community referred to as the "Beatas of Miyako" (i.e. Kyoto; Miyako no bikuni) - the only such women's group in the period.

When the Siege of Osaka broke out at the beginning of 1614 at the start of the general persecution of Christianity by the bakufu, Julia and eight other beatas were apprehended, tied in sacks, carried around the city, then left on the ground for a while. At the end of the year, they were banished from the country as dangers to the political order, along with most local and foreign Christian clergy, as well as laity such as her brother Joan and Takayama Ukon and their families. She spent the remainder of her life in Manila, the capital of the Spanish East Indies, where she and the other Japanese ladies lived a conventual life. She died on March 28, 1627.
