= Naitō Joan =

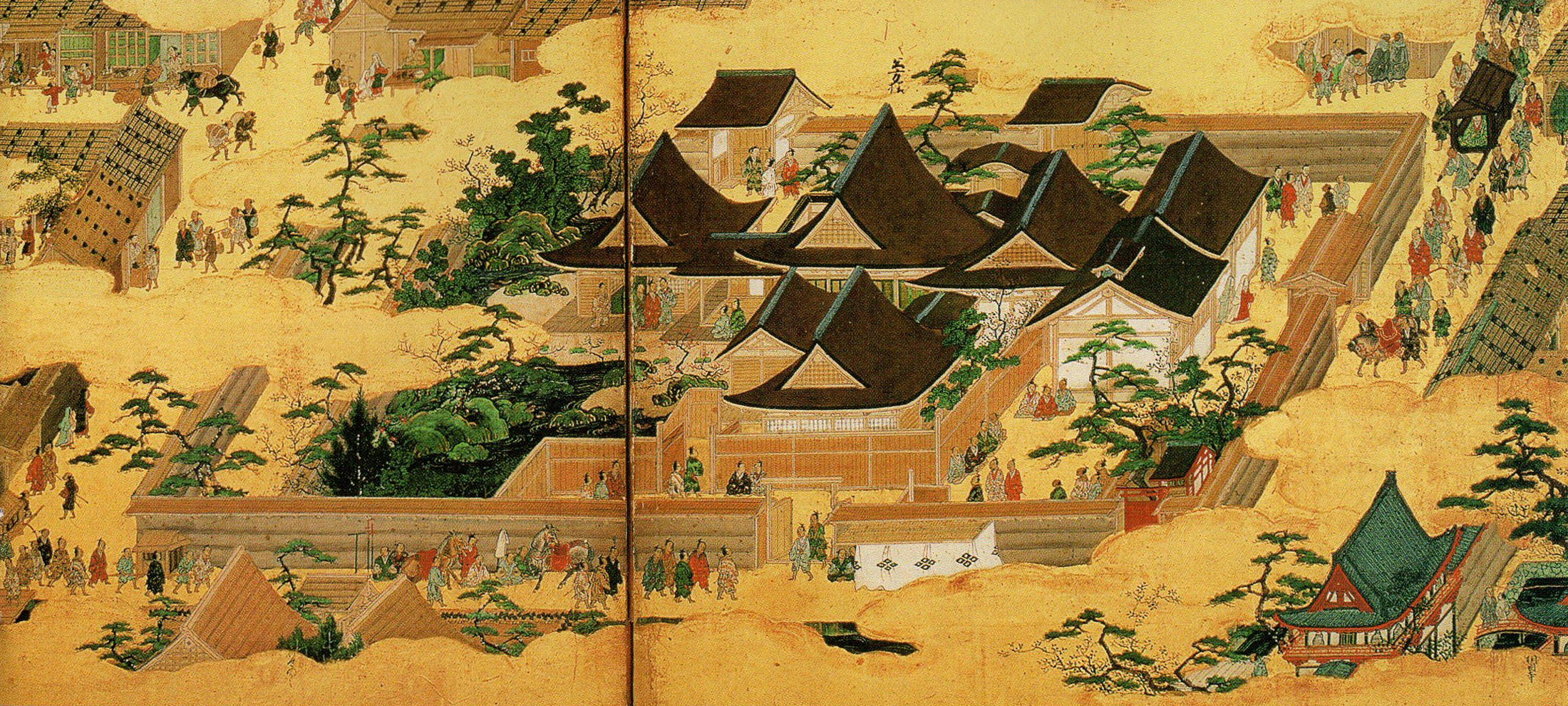
The Hana no Gosho Palace of Ashikaga clan was existed in Kyoto until 1559.

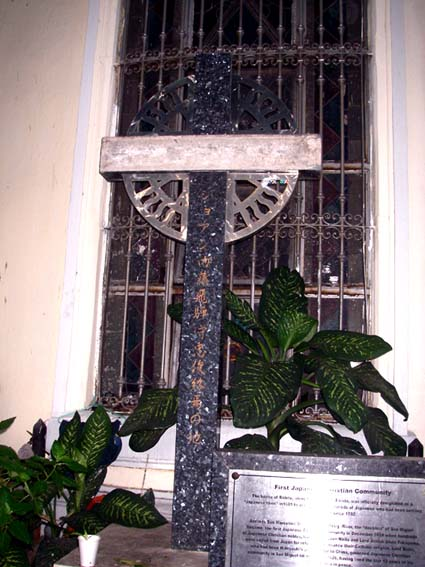
Memorial to Naitō Joan in Manila.

Naitō Joan (内藤 如安, died 1626), son of Matsunaga Nagayori, was a Japanese samurai and lord of Yagi Castle in the Civil War period.

Earlier called Naitō Tadatoshi (内藤 忠俊), he was appointed by Nobunaga Oda as the Magistrate of Kameoka, Kyoto Pref., and then in 1573 had the task of guarding the Hanano Gosho, the Palace of the Shōgun Yoshiaki Ashikaga in Kyoto, with his 2,000 soldiers.

In 1564, he was baptised into the Catholic Church and took the name Joan (from Portuguese João). He was the brother of the famous woman catechist, Naitō Julia. Following the shogunate’s anti-Christian edict of 1614, he was banished to Manila, where he died in 1626.
