= Muromachi (disambiguation) =

The Muromachi period was a division of Japanese history, running from approximately 1336 to 1573.

Muromachi (室町), may also refer to:

- Muromachi Street (室町通, Muromachi-dōri) in Kyoto, Japan
- Muromachi shogunate, a shogunate during the Muromachi period
- Muromachi, Tokyo
