= Ōban (disambiguation) =

Ōban is a feudal Japanese gold unit of currency. It may also refer to:

- Ōban (Great Watch), a troop contingent of feudal Japan
- Ōban (printing), a Japanese measurement of woodblock printing from the Tokugawa period
- Ōban Star-Racers (2006), a French-Japanese animated television series
