= Uesugi Norizane =

Samurai of the Uesugi clan

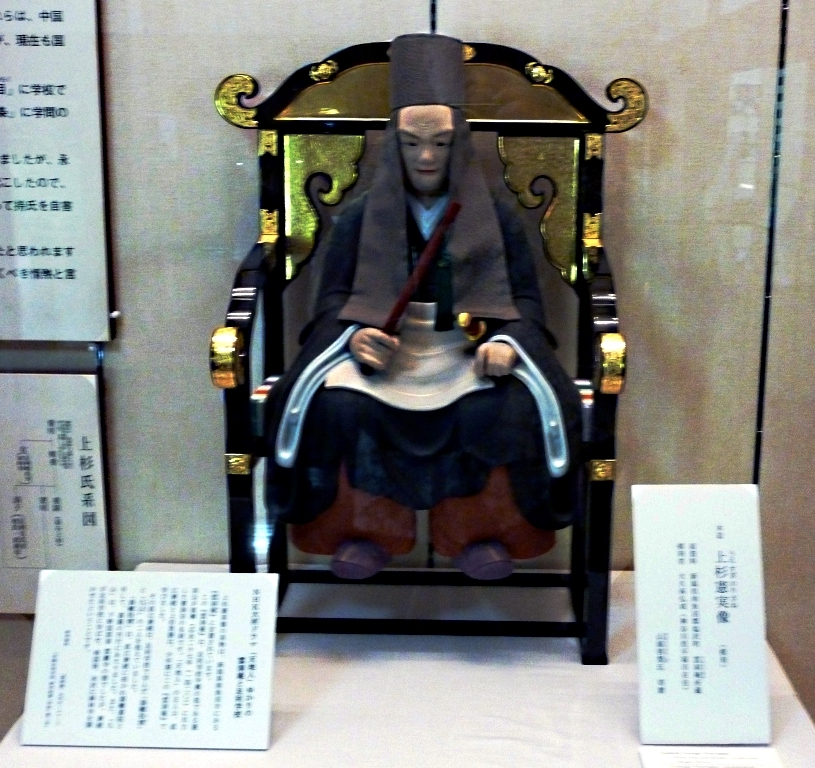
Statue of Uesugi Norizane. 1535 CE. In Ashikaga Gakko temple

Uesugi Norizane (上杉 憲実; 1410 – March 22, 1466) was a Japanese samurai of the Uesugi clan who held a number of high government posts during the Muromachi period.

Shugo (Constable) of Awa and Kōzuke Province, he was appointed Kantō kanrei (Shōgun's deputy in the Kantō region) in 1419, as an assistant to Kantō kubō Ashikaga Mochiuji. When Mochiuji rebelled against the shogunate, and attacked Norizane directly, Norizane complained to the shogunate, and fled to Kōzuke province. He returned to Kamakura in 1439, following Mochiuji's death. Norizane, as Kantō kanrei, now controlled the Kantō in the absence of a Kantō kubō; from then on, the kanrei would be the shōgun's direct deputy, the kubō serving only as an empty title.

Norizane left his post to his brother Uesugi Kiyotaka soon afterwards, and became a Buddhist monk. Over the course of his life, he was the patron of the Ashikaga Academy and helped to expand its library.
