= Ashikaga Gakkō =

Academic Building in Tochigi Prefecture, Japan

- 足利学校 (Japanese)
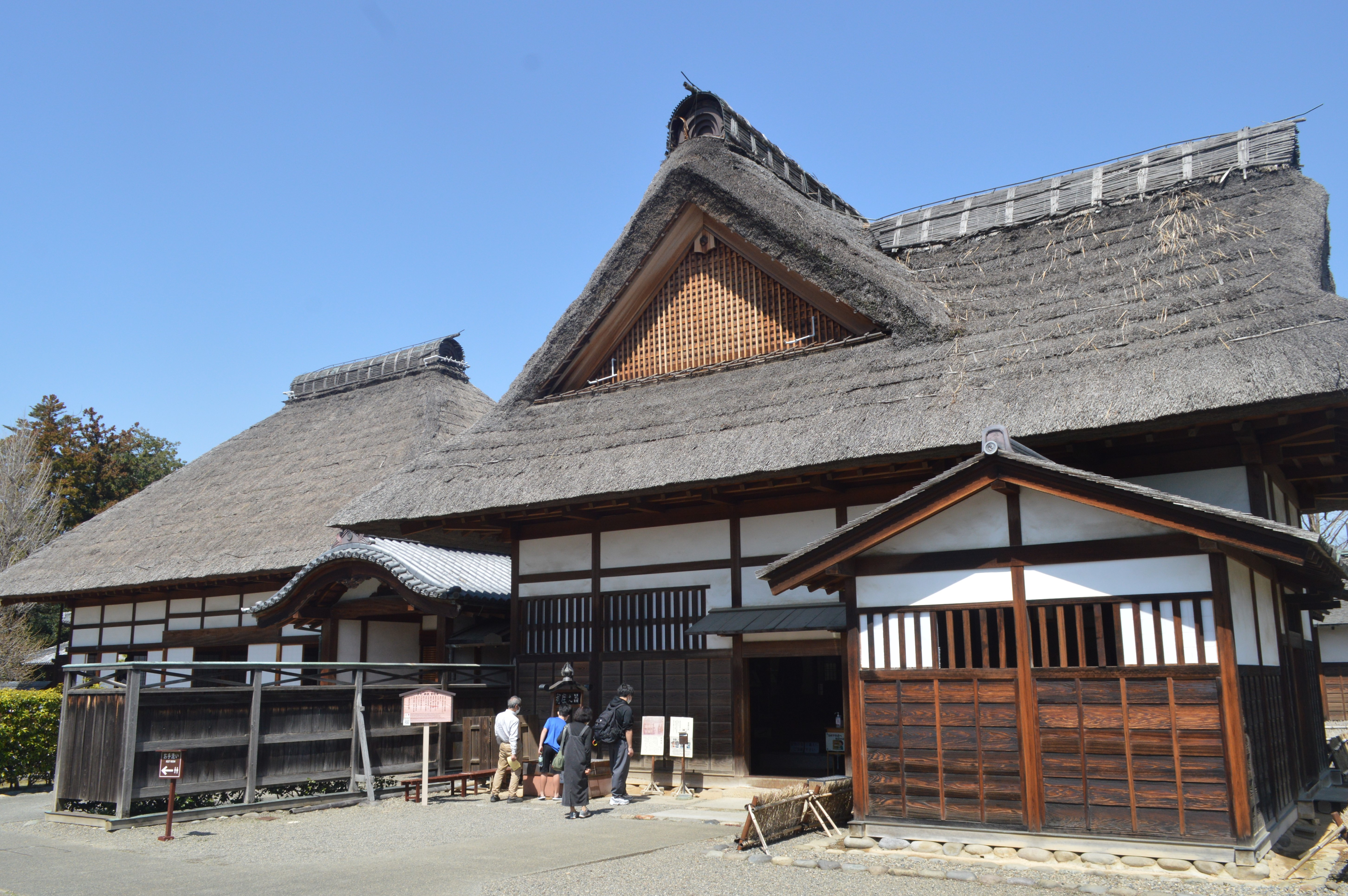
- Ashikaga Gakkō

- Ashikaga Gakkō Ashikaga Gakkō (Japan)
- 36°20′17″N 139°27′06″E
- Periods: Muromachi to Edo periods
- Location: Ashikaga, Tochigi, Japan
- Region: Kanto region

Site notes
- Public access: Yes

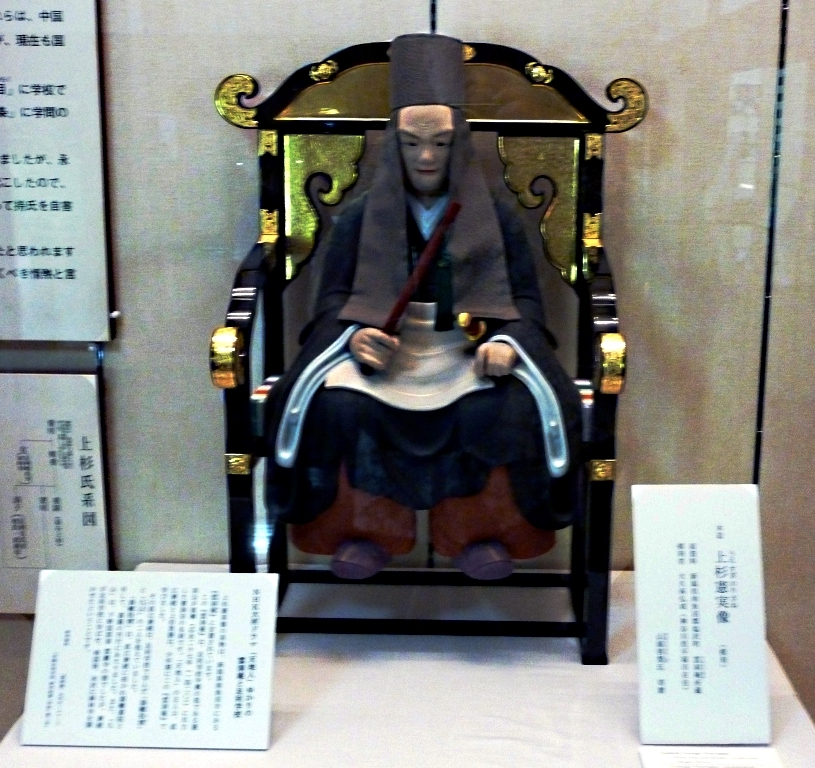
Portrait statue of Uesugi Norizane. Dated 1535. Wood with crystal eyes. 78 cm height. Ashikaga Gakkō, Japan

Ashikaga Gakkō (足利学校; "Ashikaga School") is Japan's oldest standing academic building. It is located in the city of Ashikaga, Tochigi Prefecture, about 70 kilometres north of Tokyo. It was designated a National Historic Site of Japan in 1928.

== History ==
There are various theories and controversies as to when the Ashikaga Gakkō was founded, ranging from the early Heian period to the Kamakura period, with sometime around the year 839 or 842 being the most likely based on documentary evidence. The school had declined in the first half of the Muromachi period but was revived by Uesugi Norizane in 1432 when he became lord of the surrounding Shimotsuke Province. Ujizane invited priest from Engaku-ji in Kamakura and donated books from his own collection to revitalize the schools and as a result Ashikaga Gakkō again attracted students from all over the country. He also fixed the curriculum around Chinese classical literature, Confucianism, Liezi, Zhuangzi, Shiji, I Ching and Chinese medicine. Although the instructors were mostly Zen monks, the school was a center for Confucianism and secular learning, with the teaching of Buddhist theology and doctrines expressly excluded. During the Sengoku period studies also included practical sciences, and an alternative "light curriculum" was devised for the sons of military commanders rather than full-time scholars. Tuition was free and students were expected to find accommodation at local private houses. The school had a garden to grow its own food and an herb garden to raise medicinal herbs.

The Ashikaga Gakkō suffered from a fire in 1530, but was rebuilt under the patronage of Hōjō Ujimasa and its number of students around that time was estimated at 3000. The Jesuit missionary Francisco Xavier described the school in his reports to Rome as "the largest and most famous academy in Bando" and the largest of the eleven universities and academies in Japan. However, with the rise to power of Toyotomi Hideyoshi, the Late Hōjō clan was destroyed in 1590 and the Ashikaga clan no longer had any power or influence. The Ashikaga Gakkō lost the estates that provided it with financial support and a part of its collection was looted by Hideyoshi and taken to Kyoto. Under the Tokugawa shogunate, the Ashikaga Gakkō's fortunes revived, but only slightly. Tokugawa Ieyasu granted the school a fief of 100 koku for its upkeep, and the school was also protected by the daimyō of Ashikaga Domain. However, by the middle to end of the Edo period, its teachings were increasingly regarded as obsolete, as the Neo-Confucianism of the Cheng–Zhu school became orthodoxy. By the end of the Edo period, the Ashikaga Gakkō was regarded by leading scholars as little more than a library.

After the Meiji Restoration, Confucianism itself fell from favor. Ashikaga Gakkō was closed and half the site was converted into a local elementary school. Many of its buildings were removed or destroyed. In addition, the new Tochigi Prefecture attempted to appropriate its library. In 1903, the local government established the first public library in Tochigi Prefecture, on the grounds of the Ashikaga Gakkō to preserve the old collections and to collect general books. In 1928, the site of Ashikaga Gakkō and existing buildings such as the Confucius Temple and gate received protection as a National Historic Site. A large scale restoration project began in the 1980s, which involved removing the elementary school and restoring the buildings and gardens to reproduce the Ashikaga Gakkō as it was during the middle of the Edo period.

== Gallery ==
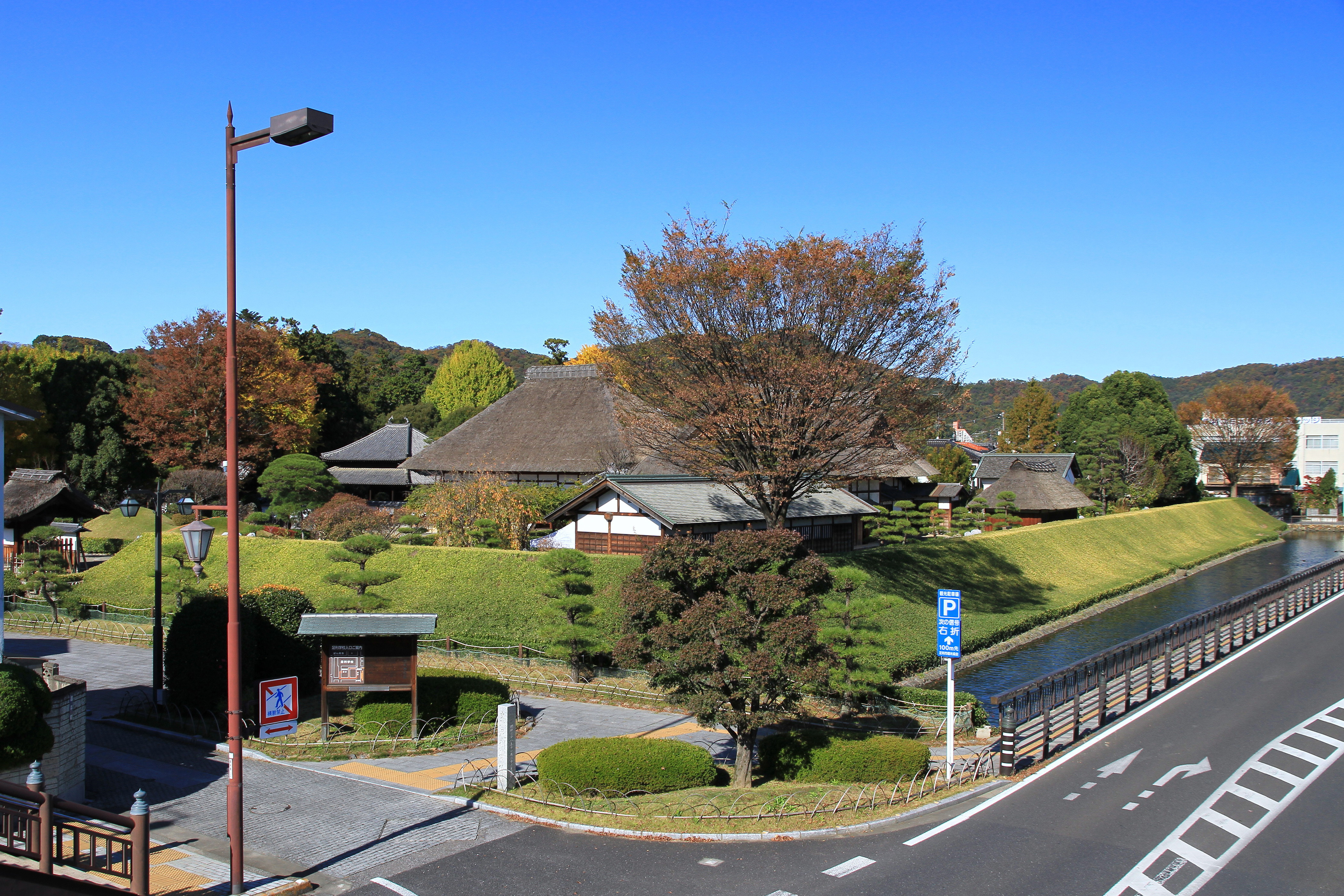
Complete view

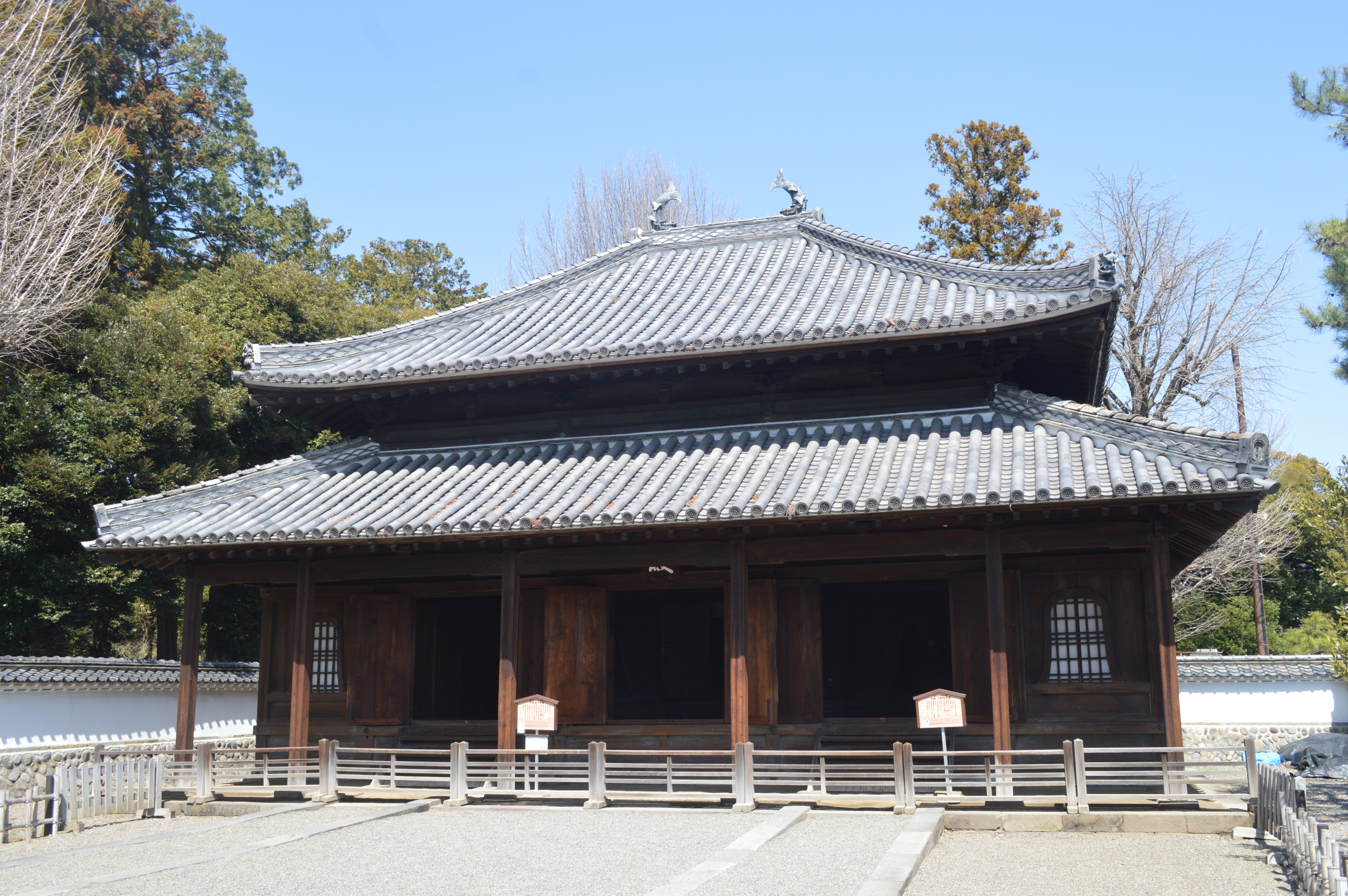
Temple of Confucius

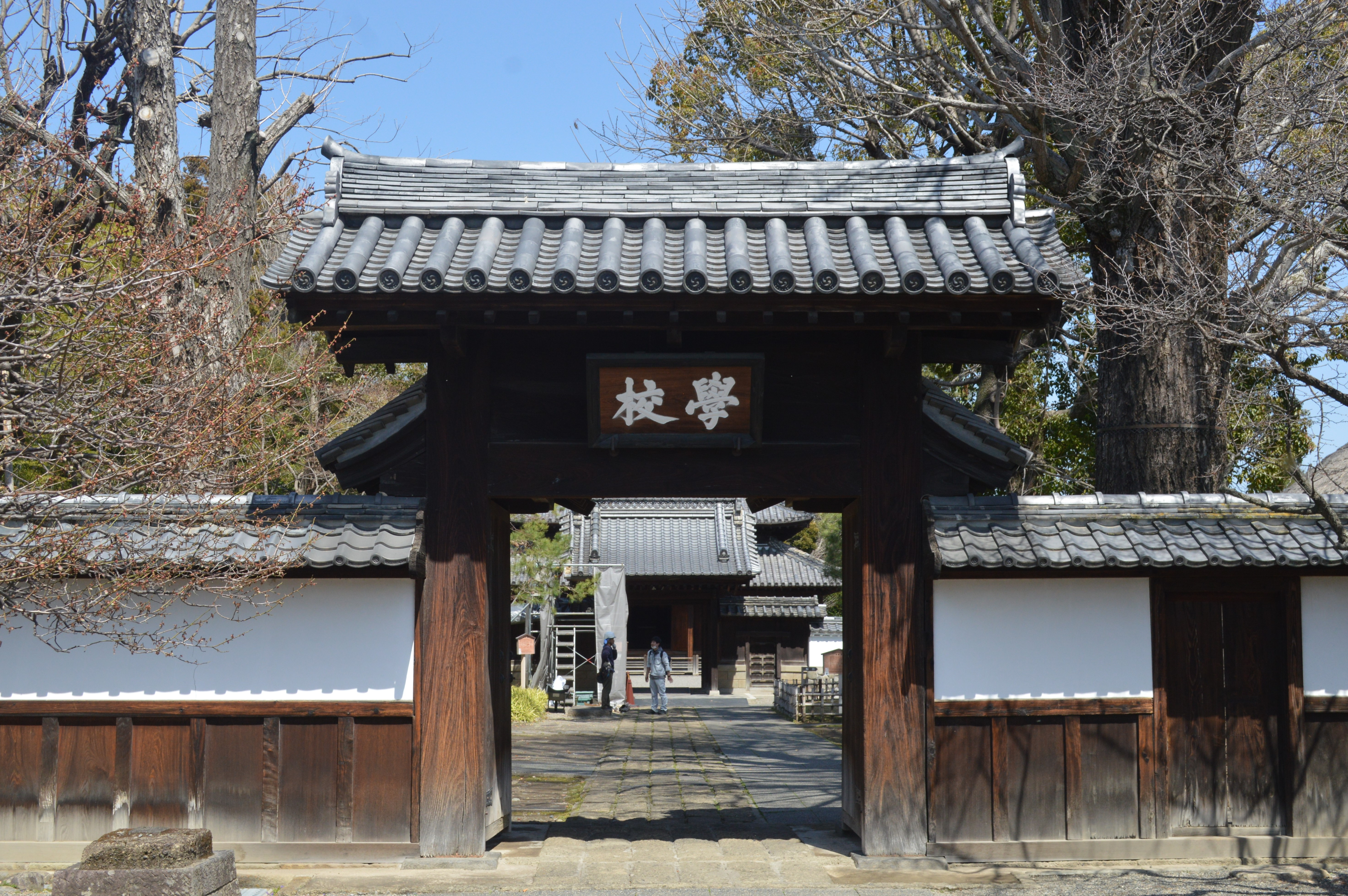
Main gate

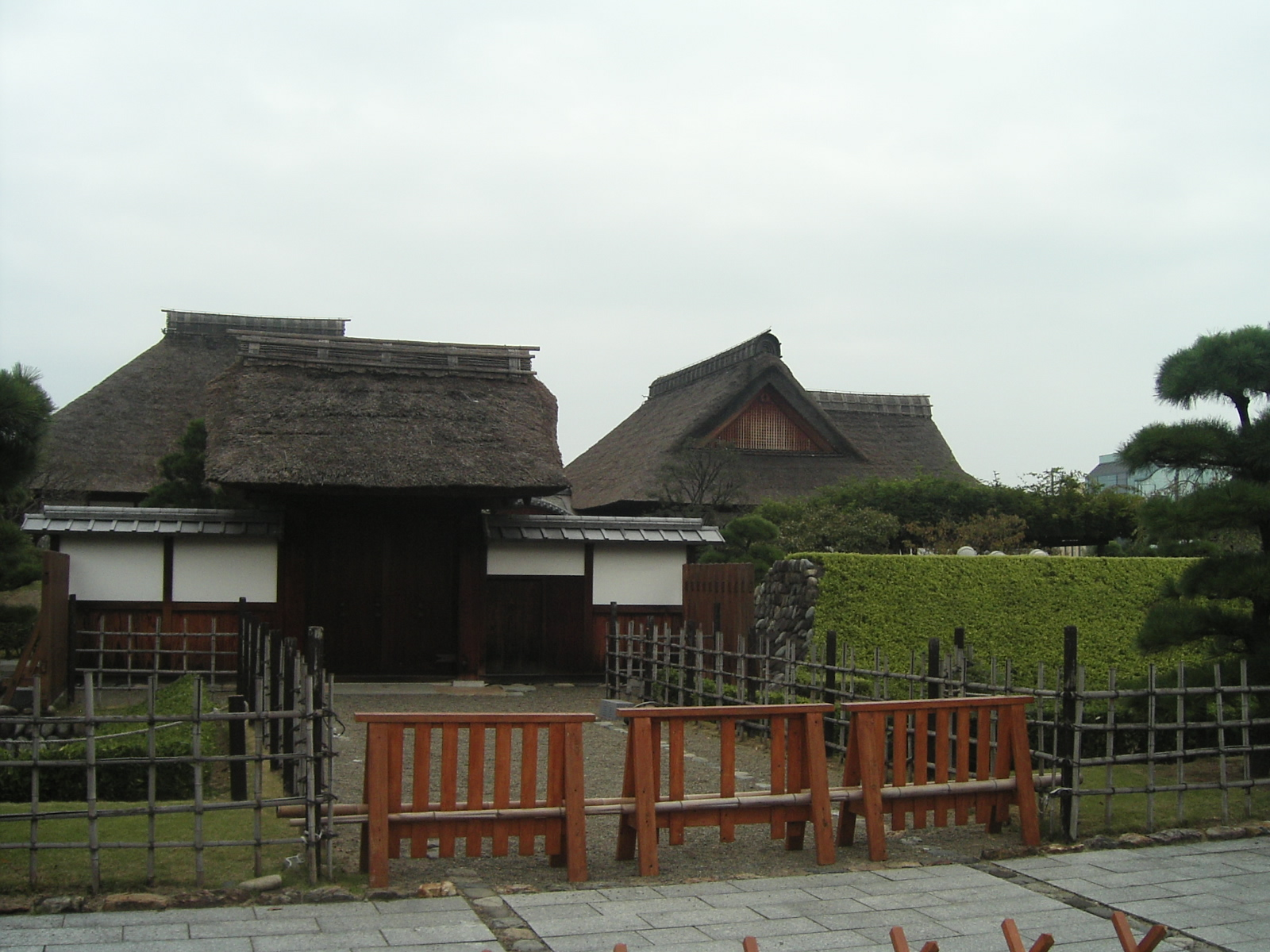
Back gate

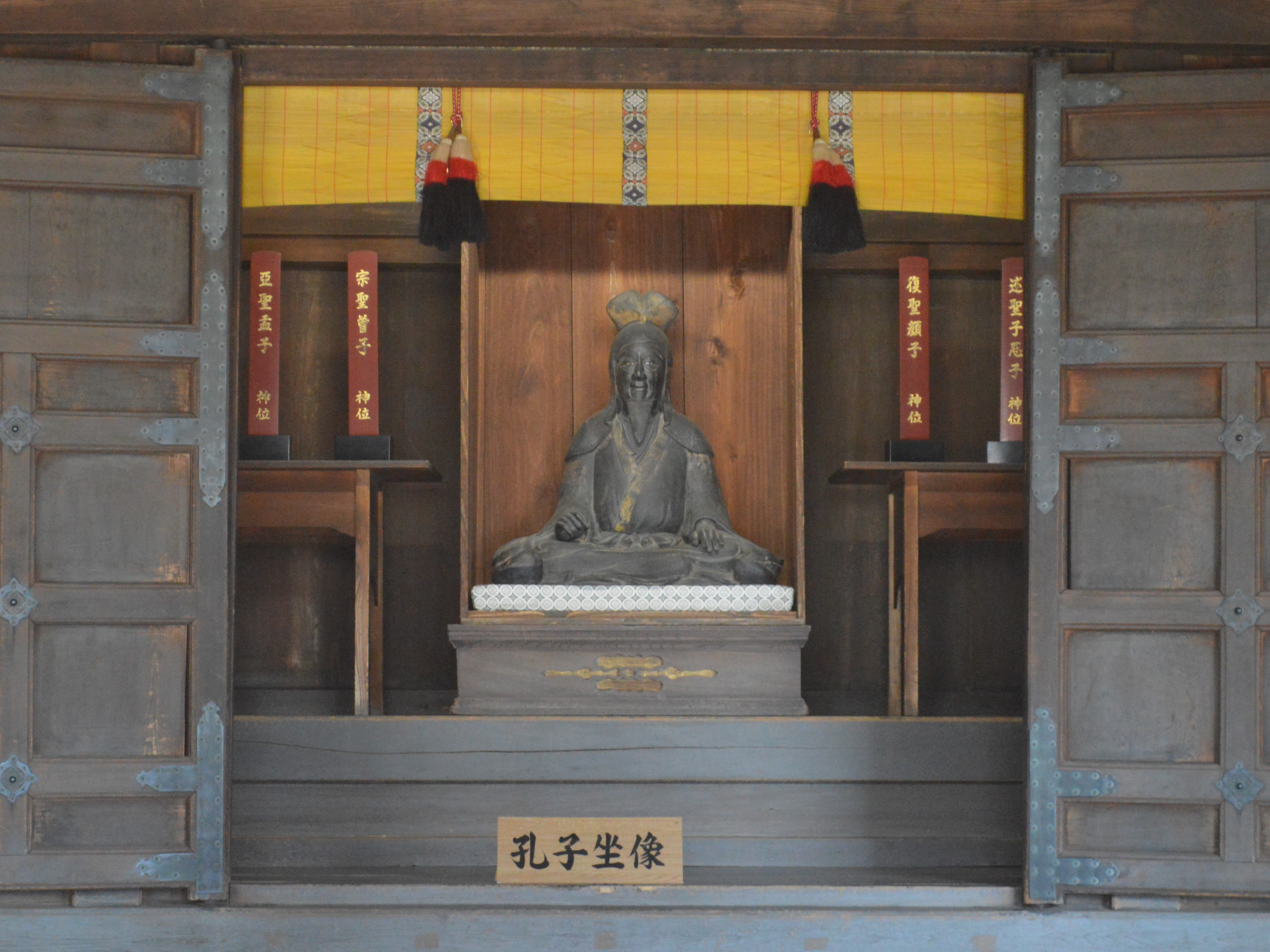
Statue of Confucius

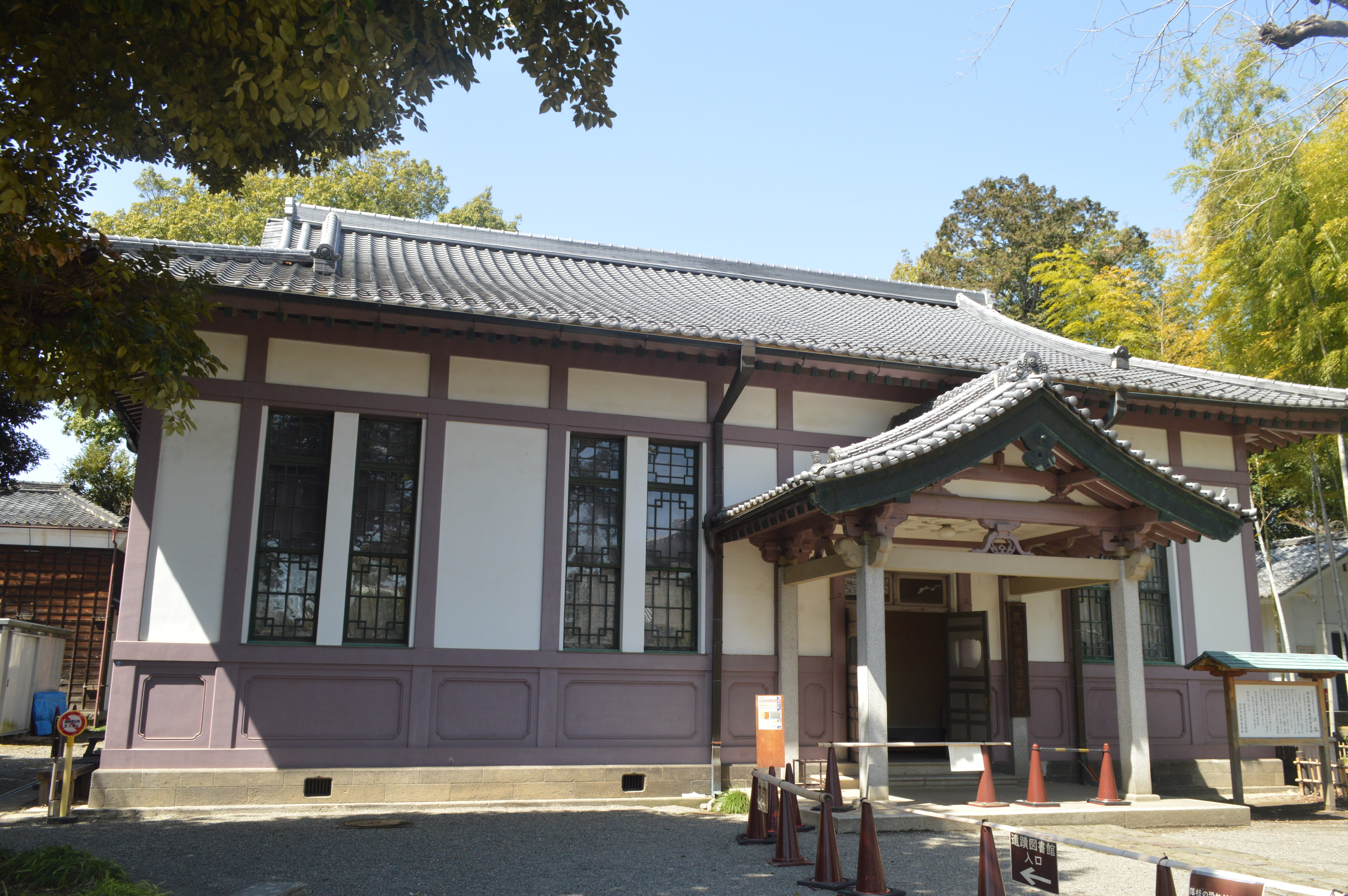
Ashikaga School Iseki Library

== See also ==
- List of Historic Sites of Japan (Tochigi)
