= Muromachi period =

Period of Japanese history from 1336–1573

The Muromachi period or Muromachi era (室町時代, Muromachi jidai), also known as the Ashikaga period or Ashikaga era (足利時代, Ashikaga jidai), is a division of Japanese history running from approximately 1336 to 1573. The period marks the governance of the Muromachi or Ashikaga shogunate (Muromachi bakufu or Ashikaga bakufu), which was officially established in 1338 by the first Muromachi shōgun, Ashikaga Takauji, two years after the brief Kenmu Restoration (1333–1336) of imperial rule was brought to a close. The period ended in 1573 when the 15th and last shogun of this line, Ashikaga Yoshiaki, was driven out of the capital in Kyoto by Oda Nobunaga.

From a cultural perspective, the period can be divided into the Kitayama and Higashiyama cultures (later 15th – early 16th centuries).

The early years from 1336 to 1392 of the Muromachi period are known as the Nanboku-chō or Northern and Southern Court period. This period is marked by the continued resistance of the supporters of Emperor Go-Daigo, the emperor behind the Kenmu Restoration. The Sengoku period or Warring States period, which begins in 1465, largely overlaps with the Muromachi period. The Muromachi period is succeeded by the Azuchi–Momoyama period (1568–1600), the final phase of the Sengoku period, and later by the Edo period (1603–1867).

== Muromachi bakufu ==
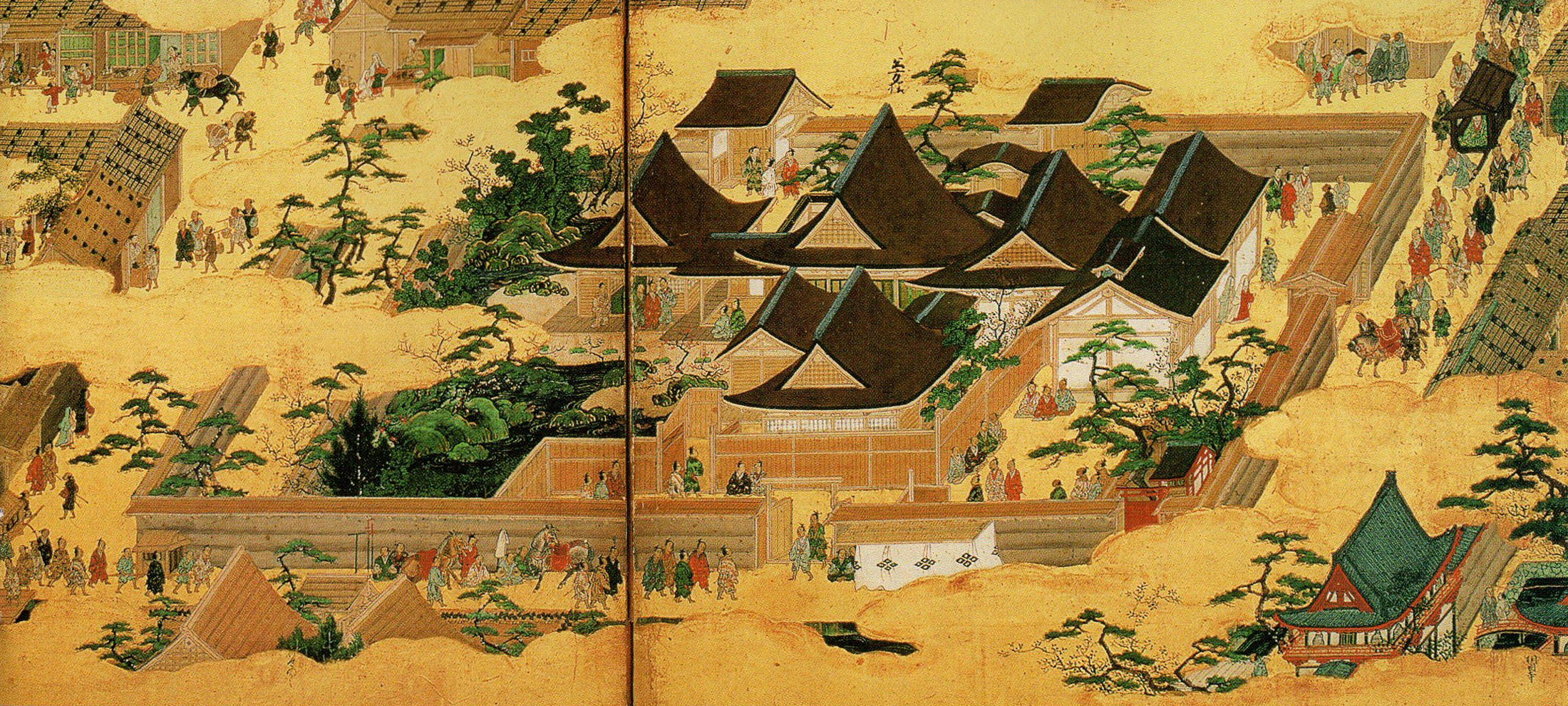
Hana-no-Gosho (Flower Palace) in Kyoto

Emperor Go-Daigo's brief attempt to restore imperial power in the Kenmu Restoration alienated the samurai class, and Ashikaga Takauji deposed Emperor Go-Daigo with samurai support. In 1338 Takauji was proclaimed shōgun and established his government in Kyoto. However, Emperor Go-Daigo escaped from his confinement and revived his political power in Nara. The ensuing period of Ashikaga rule (1336–1573) was called Muromachi after the district of Kyoto in which its headquarters – the Hana-no-gosho (花の御所; Flower Palace) – were relocated by the third shōgun Ashikaga Yoshimitsu, in 1378. What distinguished the Ashikaga shogunate from that of Kamakura was that, whereas Kamakura had existed in equilibrium with the imperial court, Ashikaga took over the remnants of the imperial government. Nevertheless, the Ashikaga shogunate was not as strong as Kamakura had been, and was greatly preoccupied with civil war. Not until the rule of Ashikaga Yoshimitsu (as shōgun, 1368–94, and chancellor, 1394–1408) did a semblance of order emerge.

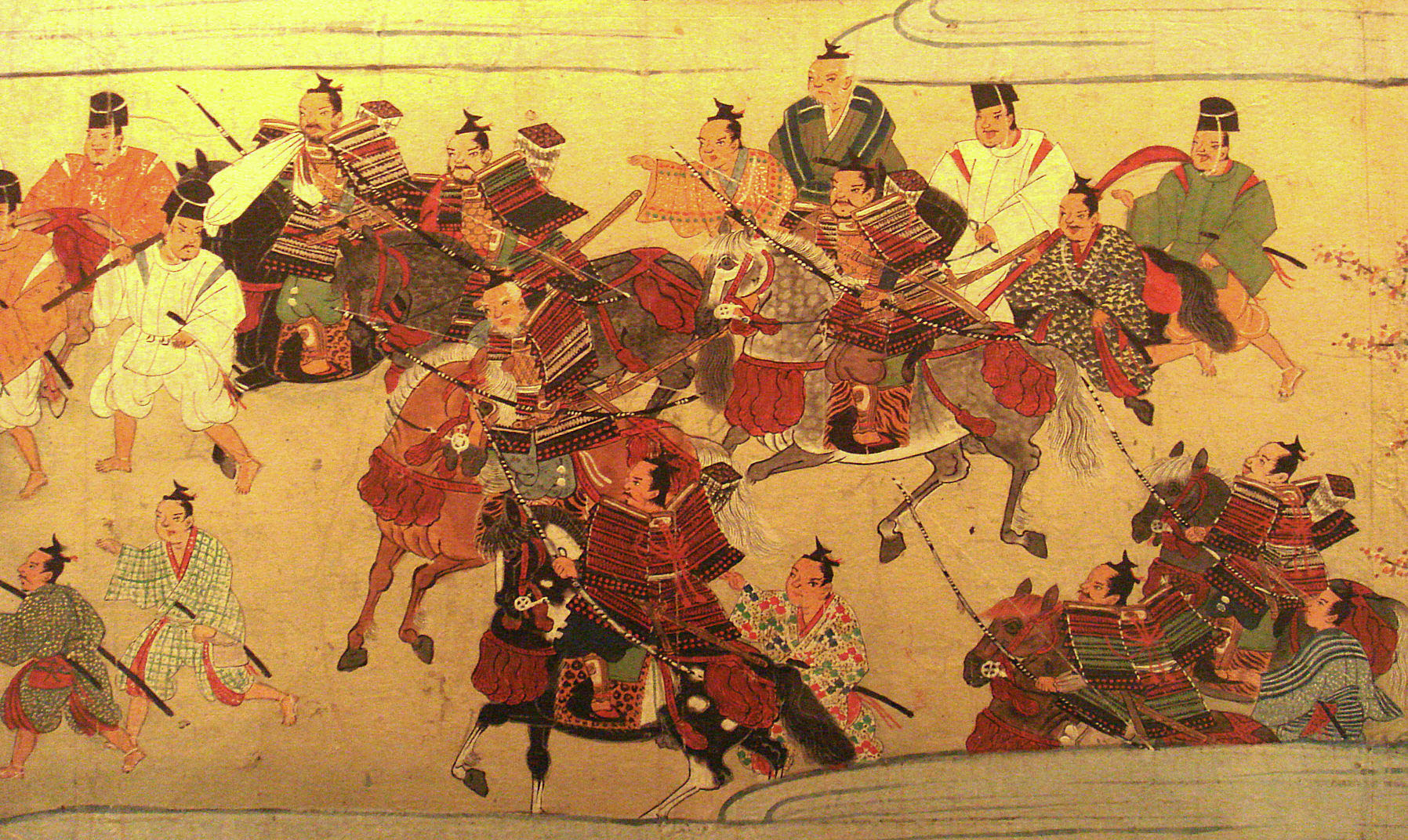
Muromachi samurai (1538)

Yoshimitsu allowed the constables, who had had limited powers during the Kamakura period, to become strong regional rulers, later called shugo. In time, a balance of power evolved between the shōgun and the shugo; the three most prominent shugo families rotated as deputies to the shōgun at Kyoto. Yoshimitsu was finally successful in reunifying the Northern and Southern courts in 1392, but despite his promise of greater balance between the imperial lines, the Northern Court maintained control over the throne thereafter. The line of shoguns gradually weakened after Yoshimitsu and increasingly lost power to the shugo and other regional strongmen. The shōgun's influence on imperial succession waned, and the shugo could back their own candidates.

In time, the Ashikaga family had its own succession problems, resulting finally in the Ōnin War (1467–77), which left Kyoto devastated and effectively ended the national authority of the bakufu. The power vacuum that ensued launched a century of anarchy.

== Economic and cultural developments ==
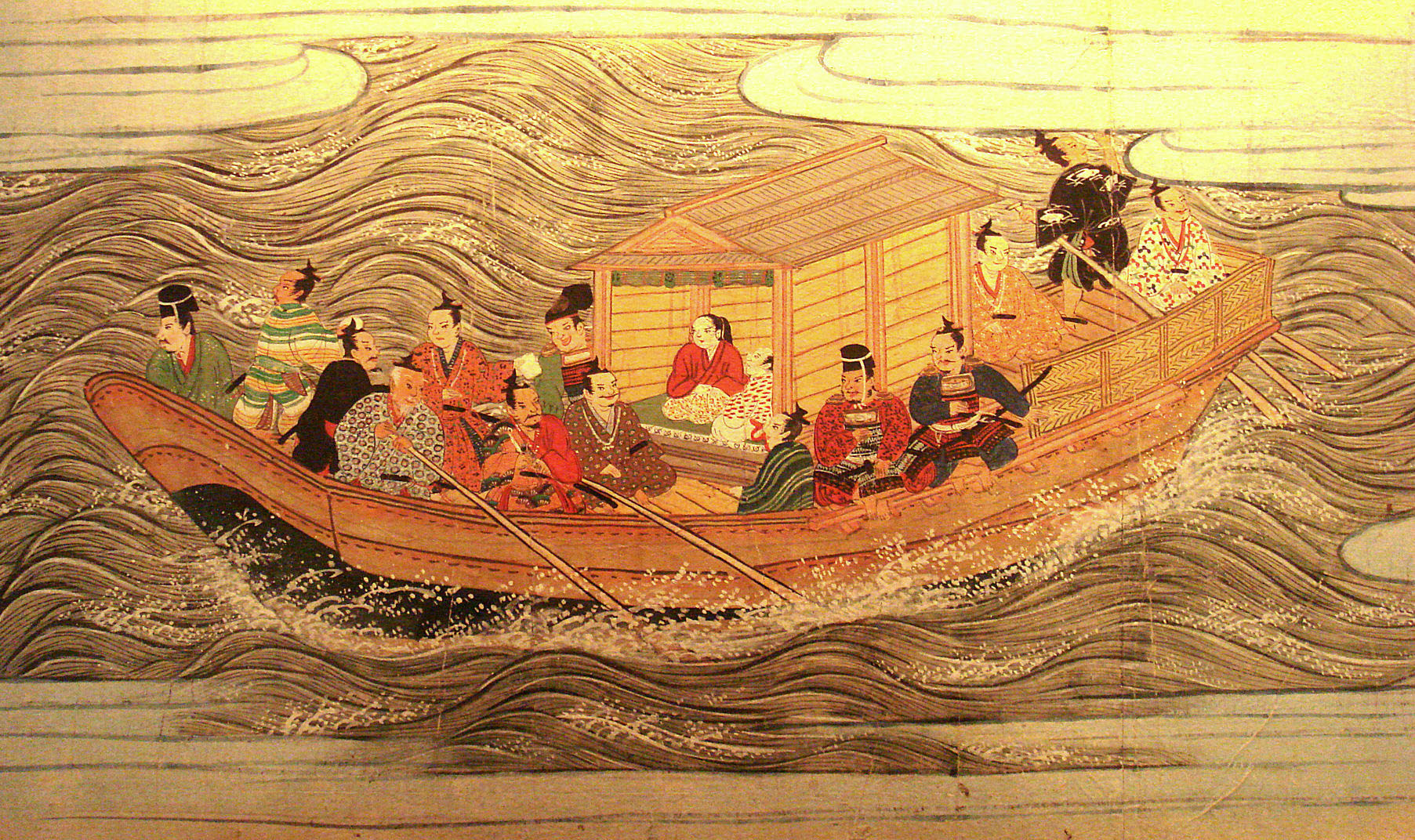
A ship of the Muromachi period (1538)

The Japanese contact with the Ming dynasty (1368–1644) began when contact with China was renewed during the Muromachi period after the Chinese sought support in suppressing Japanese pirates in coastal areas of China. Japanese pirates of this era and region were referred to as wokou by the Chinese (Japanese wakō). Wanting to improve relations with China and to rid Japan of the wokou threat, Yoshimitsu accepted a relationship with the Chinese that was to last for half a century. In 1401 he restarted the tribute system, describing himself in a letter to the Chinese Emperor as "Your subject, the King of Japan". Japanese wood, sulfur, copper ore, swords, and folding fans were traded for Chinese silk, porcelain, books, and coins, in what the Chinese considered tribute but the Japanese saw as profitable trade.

During the time of the Ashikaga bakufu, a new national culture, called Muromachi culture, emerged from the bakufu headquarters in Kyoto to reach all levels of society, strongly influenced by Zen Buddhism.

=== Zen Buddhism ===
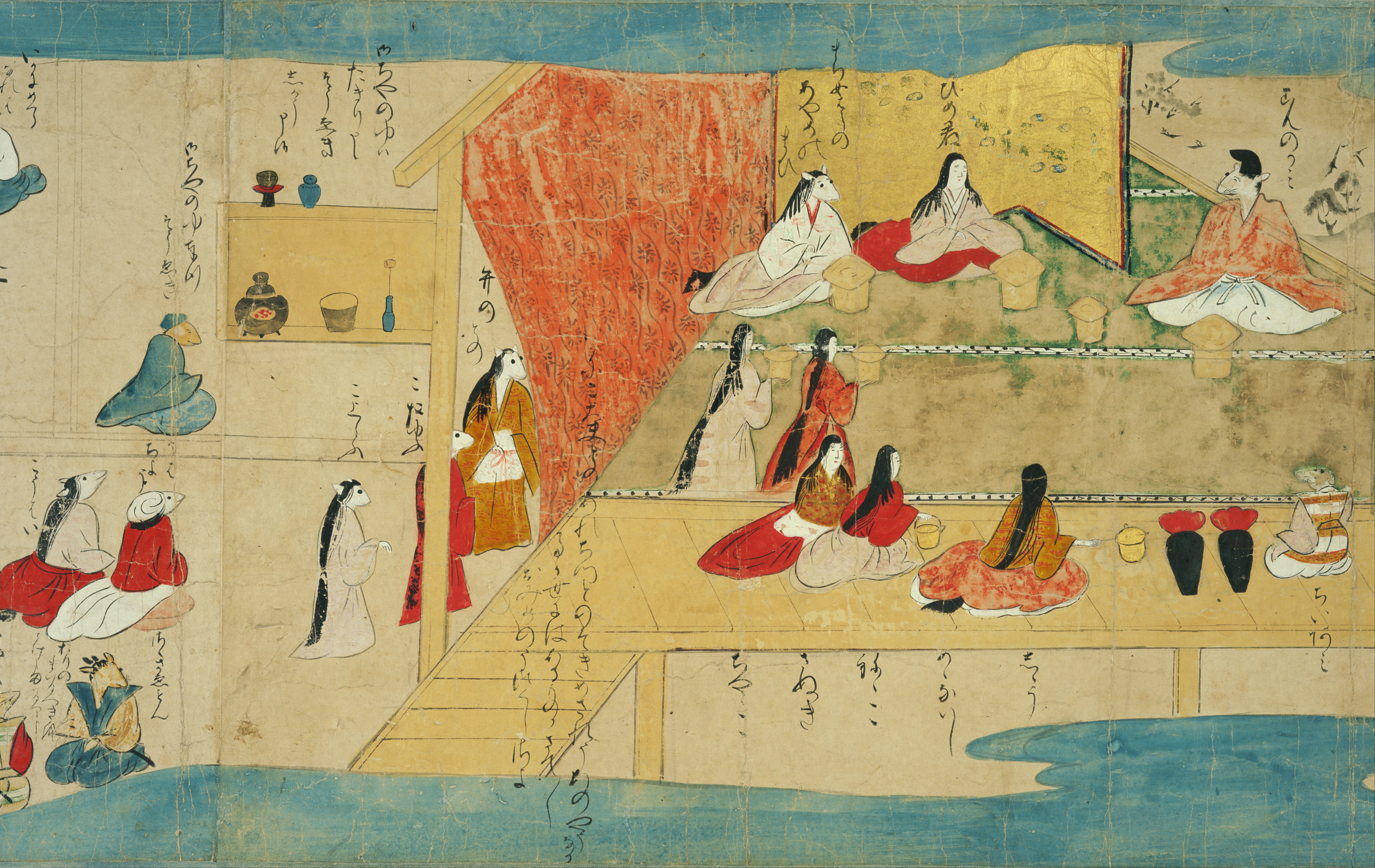
Muromachi-era illustration to a fictional narrative

Zen played a central role in spreading not only religious teachings and practices but also art and culture, including influences derived from paintings of the Chinese Song (960–1279), Yuan, and Ming dynasties. The proximity of the imperial court to the bakufu resulted in a co-mingling of imperial family members, courtiers, daimyō, samurai, and Zen priests. During the Muromachi period, the re-constituted Blue Cliff Record became the central text of Japanese Zen literature; it still holds that position today.

=== Shinto ===
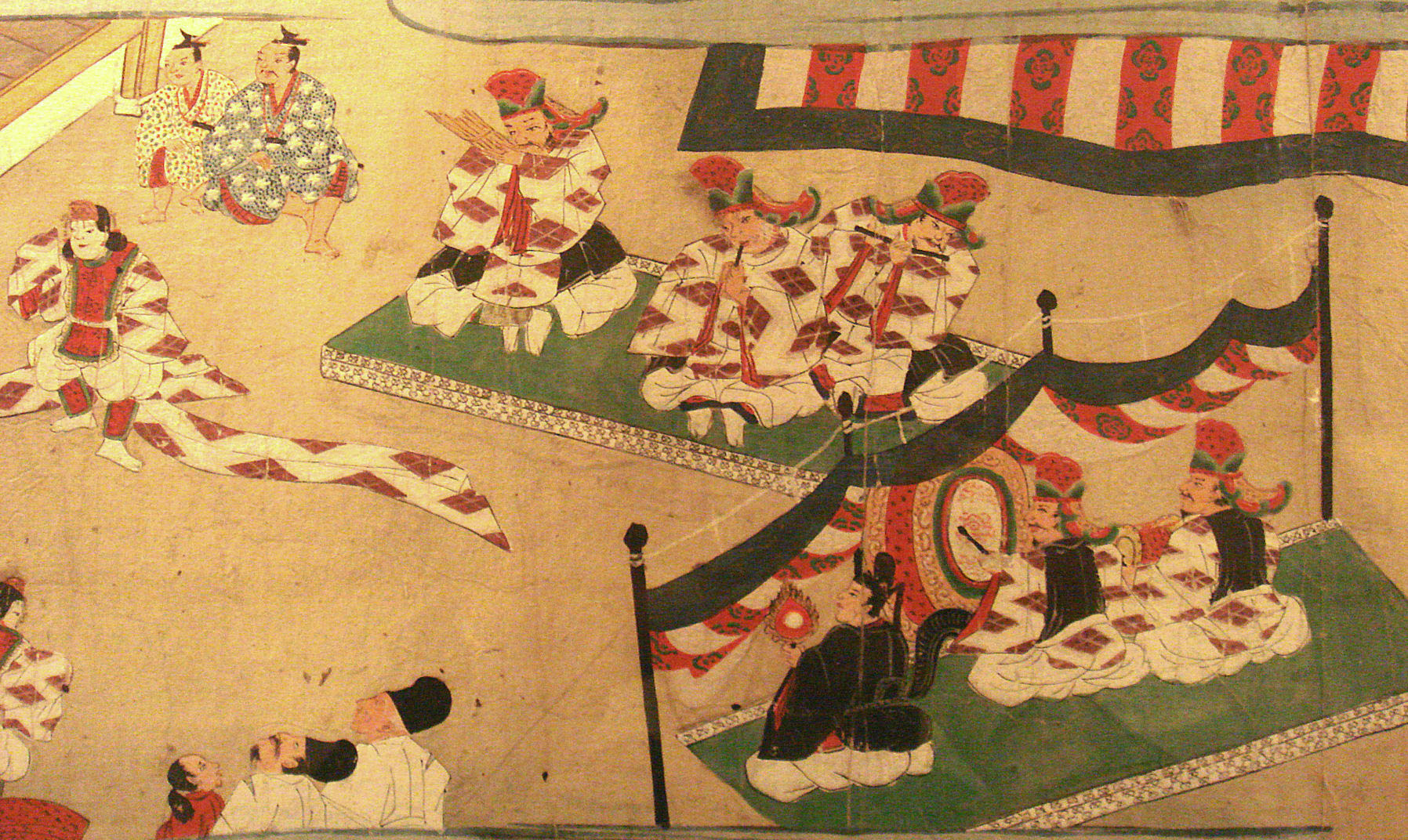
Music scene during the Muromachi period (1538)

There was renewed interest in Shinto, which had quietly coexisted with Buddhism during the centuries of the latter's predominance. Shinto, which lacked its own scriptures and had few prayers, had, as a result of syncretic practices begun in the Nara period, widely adopted Shingon Buddhist rituals. Between the eighth and fourteenth centuries, Shinto was nearly totally absorbed by Buddhism, becoming known as Ryōbu Shinto (Dual Shinto).

This doctrine held that the deities enshrined at the Inner and Outer Shrines of Ise corresponded to the two fundamental mandalas of esoteric Shingon Buddhism, the Womb Realm (Taizōkai) and the Diamond Realm (Kongōkai); Amaterasu herself was understood, through the doctrine of honji suijaku, as the "manifest trace" (suijaku) of the Buddha Mahavairocana (Dainichi Nyorai), her "original essence" (honji). Its most representative branches were Goryū Shintō, centered on the temple of Ninna-ji in Kyoto, and Miwa Shintō, centered on Ōmiwa-dera, both of which spread widely during the medieval period.

The Mongol invasions in the late thirteenth century, however, evoked a national consciousness of the role of the kamikaze in defeating the enemy. Less than fifty years later (1339–43), Kitabatake Chikafusa (1293–1354), the chief commander of the Southern Court forces, wrote the Jinnō Shōtōki. This chronicle emphasized the importance of maintaining the divine descent of the imperial line from Amaterasu to the current emperor, a condition that gave Japan a special national polity (kokutai). Besides reinforcing the concept of the emperor as a deity, the Jinnōshōtōki provided a Shinto view of history, which stressed the divine nature of all Japanese and the country's spiritual supremacy over China and India. Buddhism, arriving in the 6th century, impacted education but did not replace Shinto.

=== Education ===
Confucianism began to be recognized as essential to the education of a daimyo in the Muromachi period. When Genju Keian, who returned from the Ming dynasty, traveled around Kyushu, he was invited by the Kikuchi clan in Higo Province and the Shimazu clan in Satsuma Province to give a lecture; and later, he established the Satsunan school (school of Neo-Confucianism in Satsuma). In Tosa, Baiken Minamimura, who lectured on Neo-Confucianism, became known as the founder of Nangaku (Neo-Confucianism in Tosa); in Hokuriku region, Nobutaka Kiyohara lectured on Confucianism for various daimyo such as the Hatakeyama clan in Noto Province, the Takeda clan in Wakasa Province, and the Asakura clan in Echizen Province.

Meanwhile, in the eastern part of Japan, Norizane Uesugi re-established the Ashikaga Gakko, Japan's oldest surviving academic institution, by adding a collection of books and so priests and warriors from all over the country gathered there to learn. For the Ashikaga Gakko, the Gohojo clan in Odawara provided protection later. Francis Xavier, a missionary of the Society of Jesus, who propagated Christianity in Japan, described that "the Ashikaga Gakko is the biggest and most famous academy of Bando in Japan (the university of eastern Japan)." Shukyu Banri, a priest and a composer of Chinese-style poems, went down to Mino Province in the Onin War, and then left for Edo at Dokan Ota's invitation. He traveled all over the Kanto region, Echigo Province, and Hida Province. The above-mentioned Sesshu visited the Risshaku-ji Temple in Yamagata City, Dewa Province.

In this period, local lords and local clans considered it indispensable to acquire skills of reading, writing, and arithmetic for the management of their territories. A growing number of land deeds were written by peasants, which means that literacy was widespread even among the commoner class. The Italian Jesuit, Alessandro Valignano (1539–1606), wrote:

"The people are white (not dark-skinned) and cultured; even the common folk and peasants are well brought up and are so remarkably polite that they give the impression that they were trained at court. In this respect they are superior to other Eastern peoples but also to Europeans as well. They are very capable and intelligent, and the children are quick to grasp our lessons and instructions. They learn to read and write our language far more quickly and easily than children in Europe. The lower classes in Japan are not so coarse and ignorant as those in Europe; on the contrary, they are generally intelligent, well brought up and quick to learn."

Teikin Orai (Home Education Text Book), Joe-shikimoku (legal code of the Kamakura shogunate), and Jitsugokyo (a text for primary education) were widely used in shrines and temples as textbooks for the education of children of the warrior class. It was in the Sengoku Period that the following books were published: Setsuyoshu (a Japanese-language dictionary in iroha order) written by Soji MANJUYA, and "Ishotaizen" (The Complete Book of Medicine), a medical book in Ming's language, translated by Asai no Sozui, who was a merchant in Sakai City and a physician.

=== Ink painting ===
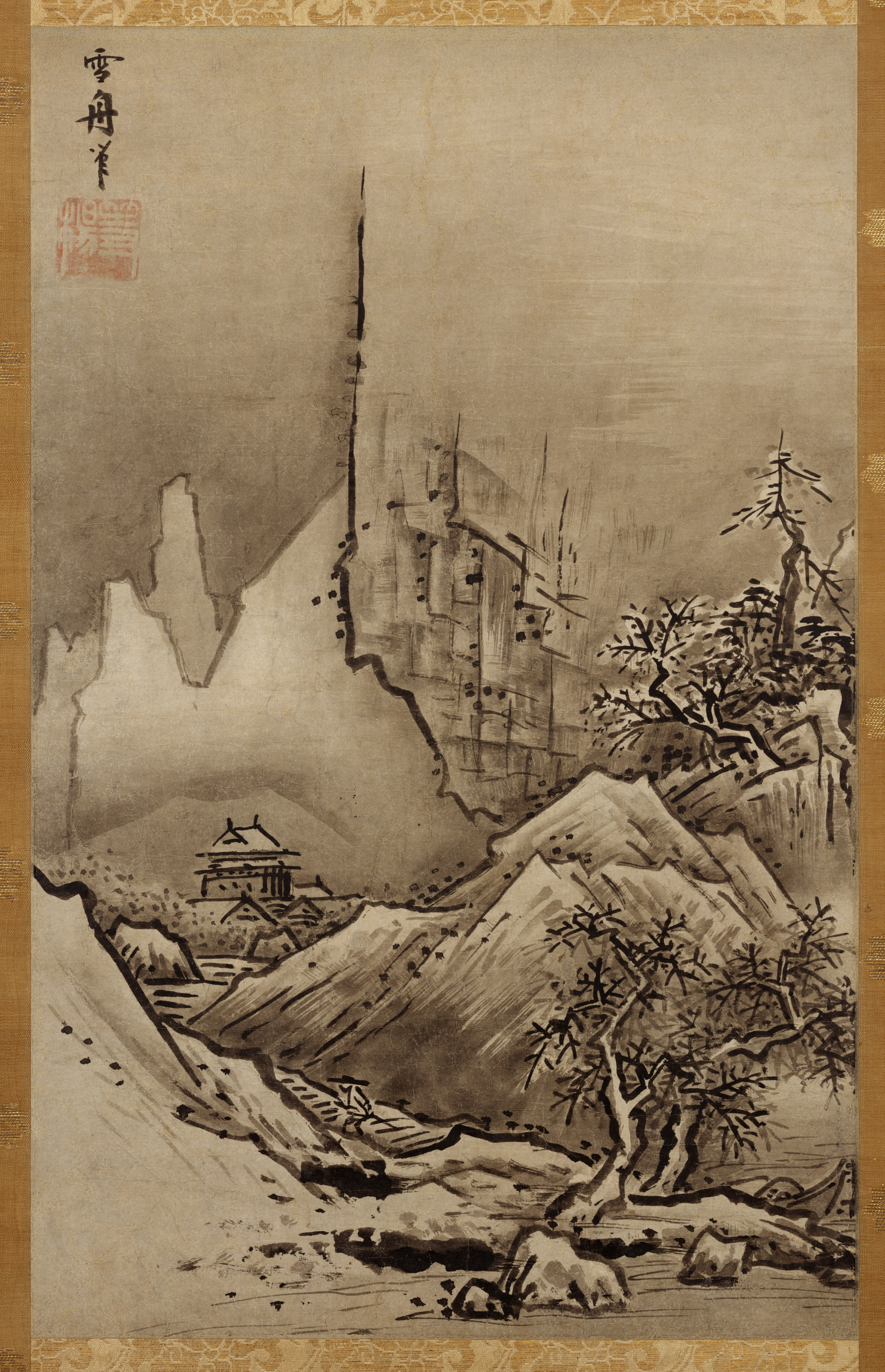
Ink wash painting by Sesshū Tōyō, c. 1470s

The new Zen monasteries, with their Chinese background and the martial rulers in Kamakura sought to produce a unique cultural legacy to rival the Fujiwara tradition. Hence, Chinese painter-monks were frequently invited to the monasteries while Japanese monks travelled back and forth such as Josetsu (1405–1496) and Sesshū Tōyō (c. 1420–1506). This exchange led to the creation of Muromachi ink painting which often included Chinese themes, Chinese ink-washing techniques, fluid descriptive lines, dry brushes, and almost invisible facial features. Despite the initial creative restrictions, Japanese Zen ink painting soon achieved poetic and indigenous expression as elements were rearranged in a Japanese manner, and brushstrokes became gentle, fluid and more impulsive. This art style would eventually be adopted by Kanō school founder Kanō Masanobu (1434–1530) and followed by his followers such as his son Kanō Motonobu (1476–1559).

=== Music, art and dance ===
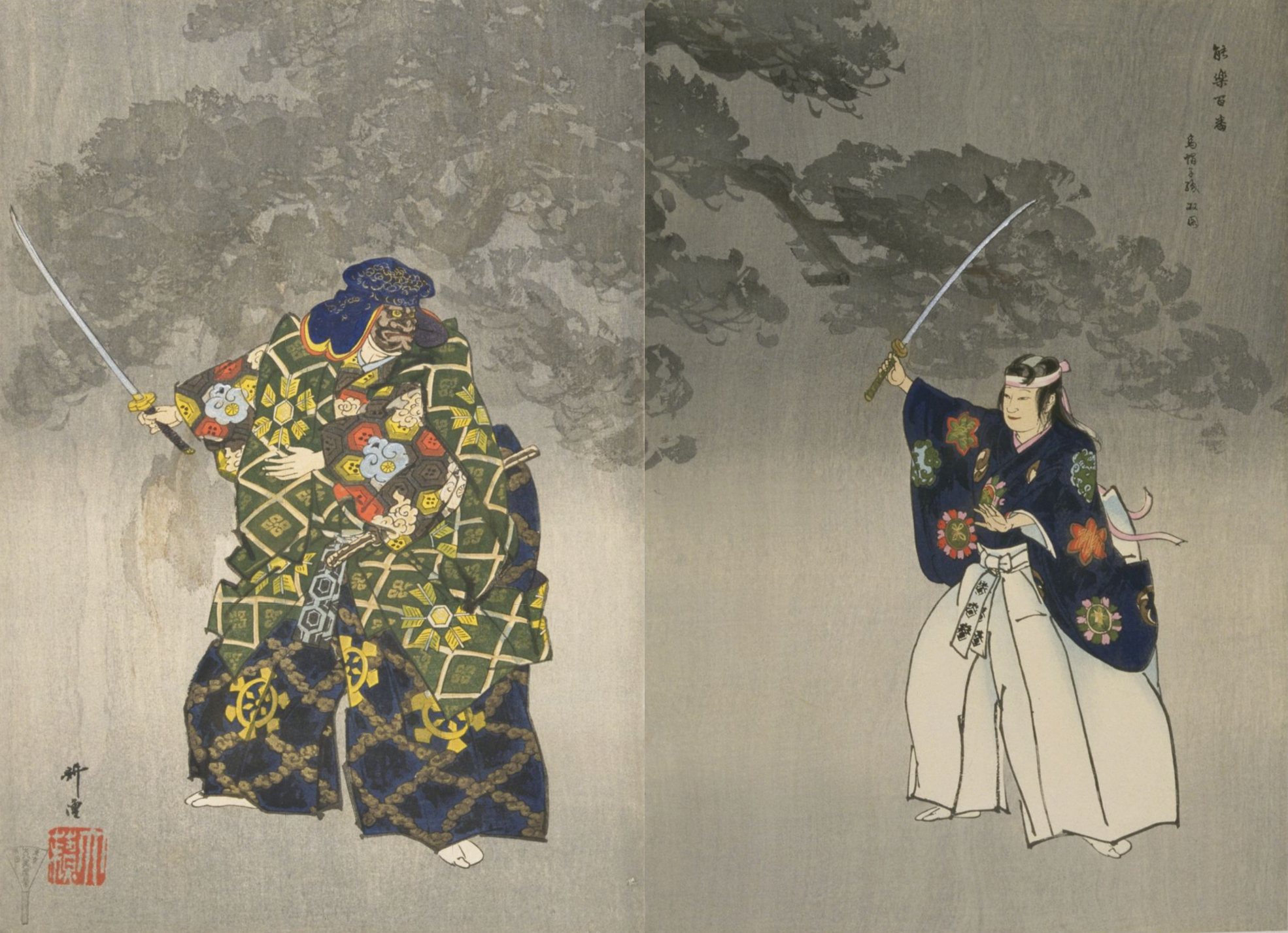
Noh theatre art by later Meiji period artist Tsukioka Kōgyo

The two most popular music and dance forms of the period in both cities and provinces was sarugaku and dengaku, which were both antecedents to Noh theatre, these music and dance styles would have included acrobatics and story plays. Both performance styles had by the Muromachi period been organized into za guilds which enjoyed the patronage of temples and shrines. Performances by travelling troupes would arrive in towns, temples and shrines. Sarugaku would more formally develop into Noh theatre due to the patronage of Ashikaga Yoshimitsu, in 1374 he attended a play by actors Kan'ami (1333–1384) and Zeami (1363 – c. 1443) who then received financial backing from the shogun. Art of all kinds—architecture, literature, kyōgen comedy, tea ceremony, landscape gardening, and flower arranging—all flourished during Muromachi times.

== Provincial wars and foreign contacts ==
The Ōnin War (1467–77) led to serious political fragmentation and obliteration of domains: a great struggle for land and power ensued among bushi chieftains and lasted until the mid-sixteenth century. Peasants rose against their landlords and samurai against their overlords as central control virtually disappeared. The imperial house was left impoverished, and the bakufu was controlled by contending chieftains in Kyoto. The provincial domains that emerged after the Ōnin War were smaller and easier to control. Many new small daimyō arose from among the samurai who had overthrown their great overlords. Border defenses were improved, and well fortified castle towns were built to protect the newly opened domains, for which land surveys were made, roads built, and mines opened. New house laws provided practical means of administration, stressing duties and rules of behavior. Emphasis was put on success in war, estate management, and finance. Threatening alliances were guarded against through strict marriage rules. Aristocratic society was overwhelmingly military in character. The rest of society was controlled in a system of vassalage. The shōen (feudal manors) were obliterated, and court nobles and absentee landlords were dispossessed. The new daimyō directly controlled the land, keeping the peasantry in permanent serfdom in exchange for protection.

=== Economic effect of wars between states ===
Most wars of the period were short and localized, although they occurred throughout Japan. By 1500 the entire country was engulfed in civil wars. Rather than disrupting the local economies, however, the frequent movement of armies stimulated the growth of transportation and communications, which in turn provided additional revenues from customs and tolls. To avoid such fees, commerce shifted to the central region, which no daimyō had been able to control, and to the Inland Sea. Economic developments and the desire to protect trade achievements brought about the establishment of merchant and artisan guilds.

=== Western influence ===
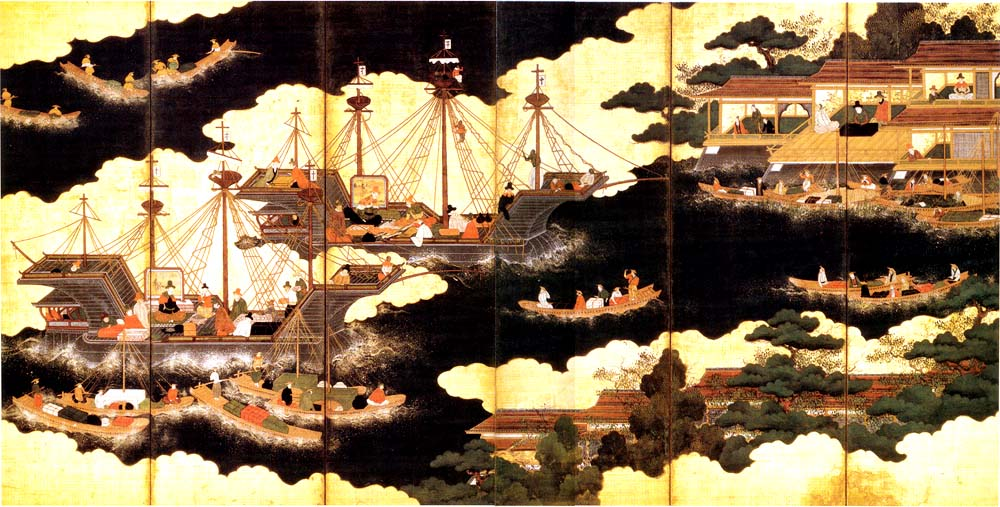
Nanban ships arriving for trade in Japan. 16th-century painting.

By the end of the Muromachi period, the first Europeans had arrived. The Portuguese landed in Tanegashima south of Kyūshū in 1543 and within two years were making regular port calls, initiating the century-long Nanban trade period. In 1551, the Navarrese Roman Catholic missionary Francis Xavier was one of the first Westerners who visited Japan. Francis described Japan as follows:

Japan is a very large empire entirely composed of islands. One language is spoken throughout, not very difficult to learn. This country was discovered by the Portuguese eight or nine years ago. The Japanese are very ambitious of honors and distinctions, and think themselves superior to all nations in military glory and valor. They prize and honor all that has to do with war, and all such things, and there is nothing of which they are so proud as of weapons adorned with gold and silver. They always wear swords and daggers both in and out of the house, and when they go to sleep they hang them at the bed's head. In short, they value arms more than any people I have ever seen. They are excellent archers, and usually fight on foot, though there is no lack of horses in the country. They are very polite to each other, but not to foreigners, whom they utterly despise. They spend their means on arms, bodily adornment, and on a number of attendants, and do not in the least care to save money. They are, in short, a very warlike people, and engaged in continual wars among themselves; the most powerful in arms bearing the most extensive sway. They have all one sovereign, although for one hundred and fifty years past the princes have ceased to obey him, and this is the cause of their perpetual feuds.

The Spanish arrived in 1587, followed by the Dutch in 1609. The Japanese began to attempt studies of European civilization in depth, and new opportunities were presented for the economy, along with serious political challenges. European firearms, fabrics, glassware, clocks, tobacco, and other Western innovations were traded for Japanese gold and silver. Significant wealth was accumulated through trade, and lesser daimyō, especially in Kyūshū, greatly increased their power. Provincial wars became more deadly with the introduction of firearms, such as muskets and cannons, and greater use of infantry.

=== Christianity ===
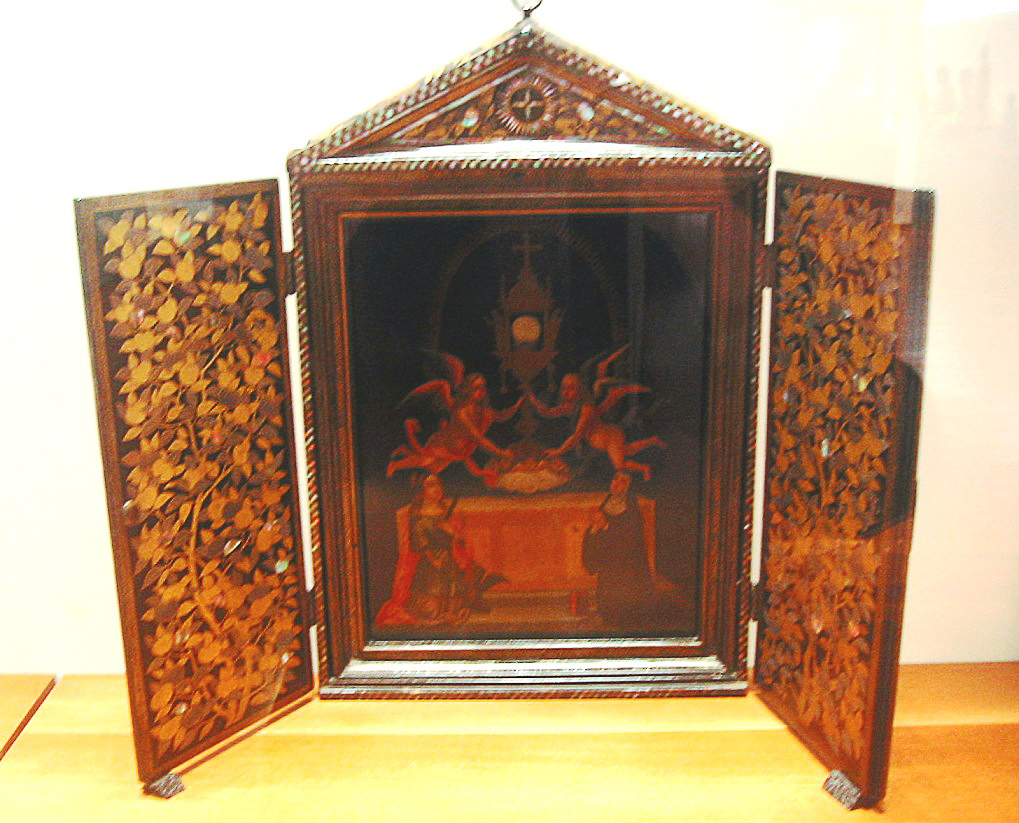
A Japanese votive altar, Nanban style. End of 16th century. Guimet Museum.

Christianity came to Japan largely through the efforts of the Jesuits, led first by the Spanish Francis Xavier (1506–1552), who arrived in Kagoshima in southern Kyūshū in 1549. Both daimyō and merchants seeking better trade arrangements as well as peasants were among the converts. By 1560 Kyoto had become another major area of missionary activity in Japan. In 1568 the port of Nagasaki, in northwestern Kyūshū, was established by a Christian daimyō and was turned over to Jesuit administration in 1579. By 1582 there were as many as 150,000 converts (two percent of the population) and 200 churches. But bakufu tolerance for this alien influence diminished as the country became more unified and openness decreased. Proscriptions against Christianity began in 1587 and outright persecutions in 1597. Although foreign trade was still encouraged, it was closely regulated, and by 1640, in the Edo period, the exclusion and suppression of Christianity became national policy.

== Events ==
- 1336: Ashikaga Takauji captures Kyoto and forces Emperor Daigo II to move to a southern court (Yoshino, south of Kyoto)
- 1338: Ashikaga Takauji declares himself shōgun, moves his capital into the Muromachi district of Kyoto and supports the northern court
- 1392: The southern court surrenders to shōgun Ashikaga Yoshimitsu and the empire is unified again
- 1397: Kinkaku-ji is built by Ashikaga Yoshimitsu.

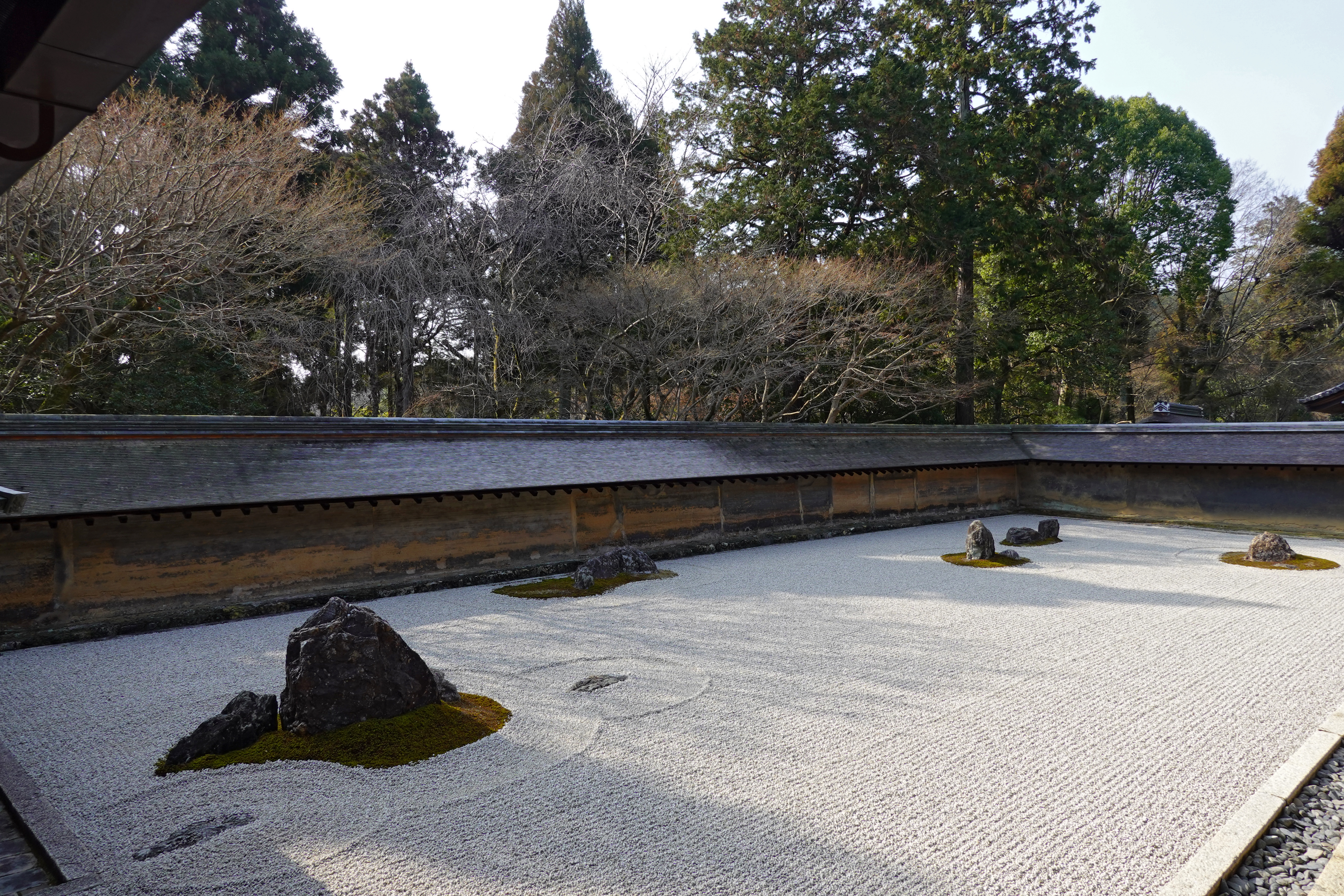
Ryōan-ji rock garden

- 1450: Ryōan-ji is built by Hosokawa Katsumoto.
- 1457: Edo is established
- 1467: The Ōnin War is split among feudal lords (daimyōs)
- 1489: Ginkaku-ji is built by Ashikaga Yoshimasa
- 1543: Firearms are introduced by shipwrecked Portuguese
- 1546: Hōjō Ujiyasu who had won the Battle of Kawagoe becomes ruler of the Kantō region
- 1549: Catholic missionary Francis Xavier arrives in Japan
- 1555: Mōri Motonari, who had won the Battle of Miyajima, becomes ruler of the Chūgoku region
- 1560: Battle of Okehazama
- 1568: The daimyō Oda Nobunaga enters Kyoto and ends the civil war, beginning the Azuchi–Momoyama period
- 1570: The Archbishopric of Edo is established and the first Japanese Jesuits are ordained
- 1570: Battle of Anegawa
- 1573: The Revolt of Ashikaga Yoshiaki begins, Oda Nobunaga overthrows the Ashikaga shogunate and extends his control over all of Japan

== See also ==
- Awataguchi Takamitsu
- Higashiyama period

Preceded by Kenmu Restoration; 1333–1336	History of Japan; Muromachi period 1336–1573	Succeeded by Azuchi–Momoyama period 1573–1603
