= Ashikaga shogunate =

Ruling military government of feudal Japan (1336–1573)

Ashikaga shogunate Ashikaga bakufu (足利幕府)
- 1336–1573
- Mon of the Ashikaga clan
- Capital: Heian-kyō
- Common languages: Late Middle Japanese
- Religion: Shinbutsu-shūgō
- Government: Absolute monarchy under a feudal stratocracy
- Emperor
  - 1332–1334: Kōgon
  - 1557–1586: Ōgimachi
- Shōgun
  - 1338–1358: Ashikaga Takauji
  - 1568–1573: Ashikaga Yoshiaki
- History
  - Established: 11 August 1336
  - Surrender of Emperor Go-Kameyama: 15 October 1392
  - Ōnin War: 1467–1477
  - Oda Nobunaga captures Heian-kyo: 18 October 1568
  - Ashikaga shogunate abolished: 2 September 1573
- Currency: Mon
Preceded by	Succeeded by
Kenmu Restoration; Ashikaga clan	Azuchi–Momoyama period

The Ashikaga shogunate (足利幕府, Ashikaga bakufu), also known as the Muromachi shogunate (室町幕府, Muromachi bakufu), was the feudal military government of Japan during the Muromachi period from 1336 to 1573.

The Ashikaga shogunate was established when Ashikaga Takauji was appointed Shōgun after overthrowing the Kenmu Restoration shortly after it had overthrown the Kamakura shogunate in support of Emperor Go-Daigo. The Ashikaga clan governed Japan from the Imperial capital of Heian-kyō (Kyoto) as de facto military rulers along with the daimyō lords of the samurai class. The Ashikaga shogunate began the Nanboku-chō period between the Pro-Ashikaga Northern Court in Kyoto and the Pro-Go-Daigo Southern Court in Yoshino until the South conceded to the North in 1392. The Ashikaga shogunate focused on the arts and improving trade rather than obtaining control of surrounding territories, leaving them weak militarily. This propelled the Ashikaga shogunate collapse, upon outbreak of the Ōnin War in 1467, beginning a state of constant civil war known as the Sengoku period, and was finally dissolved when Shōgun Ashikaga Yoshiaki was overthrown by Oda Nobunaga in 1573.

The Ashikaga shogunate's alternative name Muromachi and the Muromachi period are derived from the Muromachi district of Kyoto, where the third Shōgun, Ashikaga Yoshimitsu, established his residence nicknamed the "Flower Palace" (花の御所, Hana no Gosho) on Muromachi Street in 1379.

== Background and early period ==
From 1180 to 1185, the Genpei War was fought between the Taira and Minamoto clans, which had a longstanding violent rivalry for influence over the Emperor of Japan and his Imperial Court. The Genpei War ended with victory for the Minamoto under Minamoto no Yoritomo, establishing the Kamakura shogunate after being pronounced Shōgun and beginning the Kamakura period. The Hōjō clan rose to power and governed Japan from the city of Kamakura, while the Emperor and his Imperial Court remained in the official capital city of Heian-kyō as largely symbolic figures. The Hōjō monopoly of power, as well as the lack of a reward of lands after the defeat of the Mongol invasions, led to simmering resentment among Hōjō vassals.

In 1333, the Emperor Go-Daigo ordered local governing vassals to oppose Hōjō rule, in favor of Imperial rule in the Kenmu Restoration. The Kamakura shogunate ordered Ashikaga Takauji to quash the uprising, but for reasons that are unclear, Takauji turned against Kamakura and fought on behalf of the Imperial court, successfully overthrowing the shogunate. It is possibly because Takauji was the unofficial leader of the powerless Minamoto clan while the Hōjō clan were from the Taira clan the Minamoto had previously defeated. Japan was returned to Imperial civilian rule, but Emperor Go-Daigo's policies were unpopular and failed to satisfy those who had fought for him. In 1336, Takauji established his own military government in Kyoto, effectively overthrowing the Kenmu Restoration and appointing himself as the new Shōgun.

== Northern and Southern Courts ==
After Ashikaga Takauji established himself as the Shōgun, a dispute arose with Emperor Go-Daigo on the subject of how to govern the country. That dispute led Takauji to cause Prince Yutahito, the second son of Emperor Go-Fushimi, to be installed as Emperor Kōmyō while Go-Daigō fled Kyoto. Japan was subsequently divided between two Imperial courts: the Northern Court located in Kyoto, in favor of Kōmyō under Ashikaga influence; and the Southern Court located in Yoshino, in favor of Go-Daigō. The Northern and Southern courts engaged in an ideological struggle for power that continued for 56 years, during which time, the Northern court typically dominated the interactions between the two courts. Yet through the capture of the capital, the Southern court were occasionally able to take over. Although they were able to gain power, it was only brief; they were pushed back by the larger Northern armies. The Southern Court gave up during the reign of the third Shōgun Ashikaga Yoshimitsu in 1392 when they combined into one court.

== Government structure ==
Structure of the bakufu

The Ashikaga shogunate was the weakest of the three Japanese military governments. Unlike its predecessor, the Kamakura shogunate, or its successor, the Tokugawa shogunate, when Ashikaga Takauji established his government he had little personal territory with which to support his rule. The Ashikaga shogunate was thus heavily reliant on the prestige and personal authority of its shōgun. The centralized master-vassal system used in the Kamakura system was replaced with the highly de-centralized daimyōs (local lord) system, and because of the lack of direct territories, the military power of the shōgun depended heavily on the loyalty of the daimyō.

On the other hand, the Imperial court was no longer a credible threat to military rule. The failure of the Kenmu Restoration had rendered the court weak and subservient, a situation that Ashikaga Takauji reinforced by establishing his court near to the Emperor in Kyoto. The authority of the local daimyō greatly expanded from that of Kamakura times. In addition to military and policing responsibilities, the shogunate-appointed shugo now absorbed the judicial, economic, and taxation powers of the local Imperial governors, while the government holdings in each province were rapidly absorbed into the personal holdings of the daimyō or their vassals. The loss of both political clout and an economic base deprived the Imperial court of much of its power, which were then assumed by the Ashikaga shōgun. This situation reached its peak under the rule of the third shōgun, Ashikaga Yoshimitsu.

After Yoshimitsu however, the structural weakness of the Ashikaga shogunate was exposed by numerous succession crises and early deaths. This became dramatically more acute after the Ōnin War, after which the shogunate itself became reduced to little more than a local political force in Kyoto.

== Foreign relations ==
The Ashikaga shogunate's foreign relations policy choices were played out in evolving contacts with Joseon on the Korean Peninsula and with imperial China. The utilization of daimyo was essential for this trade; daimyo located on the Tsushima Island acted as a middleman for trade between the Ashikaga shoguns and Joseon Korea. The relationship between China was active until China adopted Confucian values. Yet the trade did not slow, rather exchanging products with each other and labeling them as offerings from emperor to emperor. Yoshimitsu, at the age of ten, expanded on the trade relations with other empires. Receiving major quantities of porcelain, silk, and bronze coins from China. In return, he sent swords, lumber, and ores as gifts to China. There was also marginal trading done with Southeast Asia, sending out similar items, with the addition of furs, to acquire spices or other kinds of lumber.

== Fall of the shogunate ==
Bloody succession crises amongst the warrior families led to a decline in the authority of the bakufu until it almost vanished by 1441 at the death of Ashikaga Yoshinori. The lack of government control was especially acute when the daimyō feuded among themselves in the pursuit of power during the Ōnin War (1467–1477), until it erupted into open warfare in the late Muromachi period, also known as the Sengoku period.

When the shōgun Ashikaga Yoshiteru was assassinated in 1565, an ambitious daimyō, Oda Nobunaga, seized the opportunity and installed Yoshiteru's brother Ashikaga Yoshiaki as the 15th Ashikaga shōgun and Nobunaga's puppet. However Yoshiaki was not entirely subservient to Nobunaga: he continued to strike bargains amongst the monasteries to gain favor, and mediated between powerful clans such as the Otomo and Mori. The Ashikaga shogunate was finally destroyed in 1573 when Nobunaga drove Yoshiaki out of Kyoto. Initially, Yoshiaki fled to Shikoku. Afterwards, he sought and received protection from the Mōri clan in western Japan.

The Ashikaga family survived the 16th century, and a branch of it became the daimyō family of the Kitsuregawa domain. (Note: With the end of the Kitsuregawa line following the death of Ashikaga Atsuuji in 1983, the current de facto head of the family is Ashikaga Yoshihiro, of the Hirashima Kubō line.)

== Culture and Arts ==
The Ashikaga era was a melting pot for the development of culture and art. Zen Buddhism was a large contributor to the arts. The tea ceremony was transformed from a large open room to a small quiet setting. Tea became more of a meditation method and something to practice to relax and find elements of Zen. Floral arrangements also became a form of art. The arranging of flowers became something of spiritual value. Often used as offerings to Buddha and to show faith in the heavens. The Noh Theater was also created in this time period. The performances were enjoyed by nobles and elites, and were heavily protected. Helping to expand themes of shows and create poetry. During the times of the Onin war, the performing arts had suffered but were quickly resurrected when power had fully shifted.

== Palace remains ==
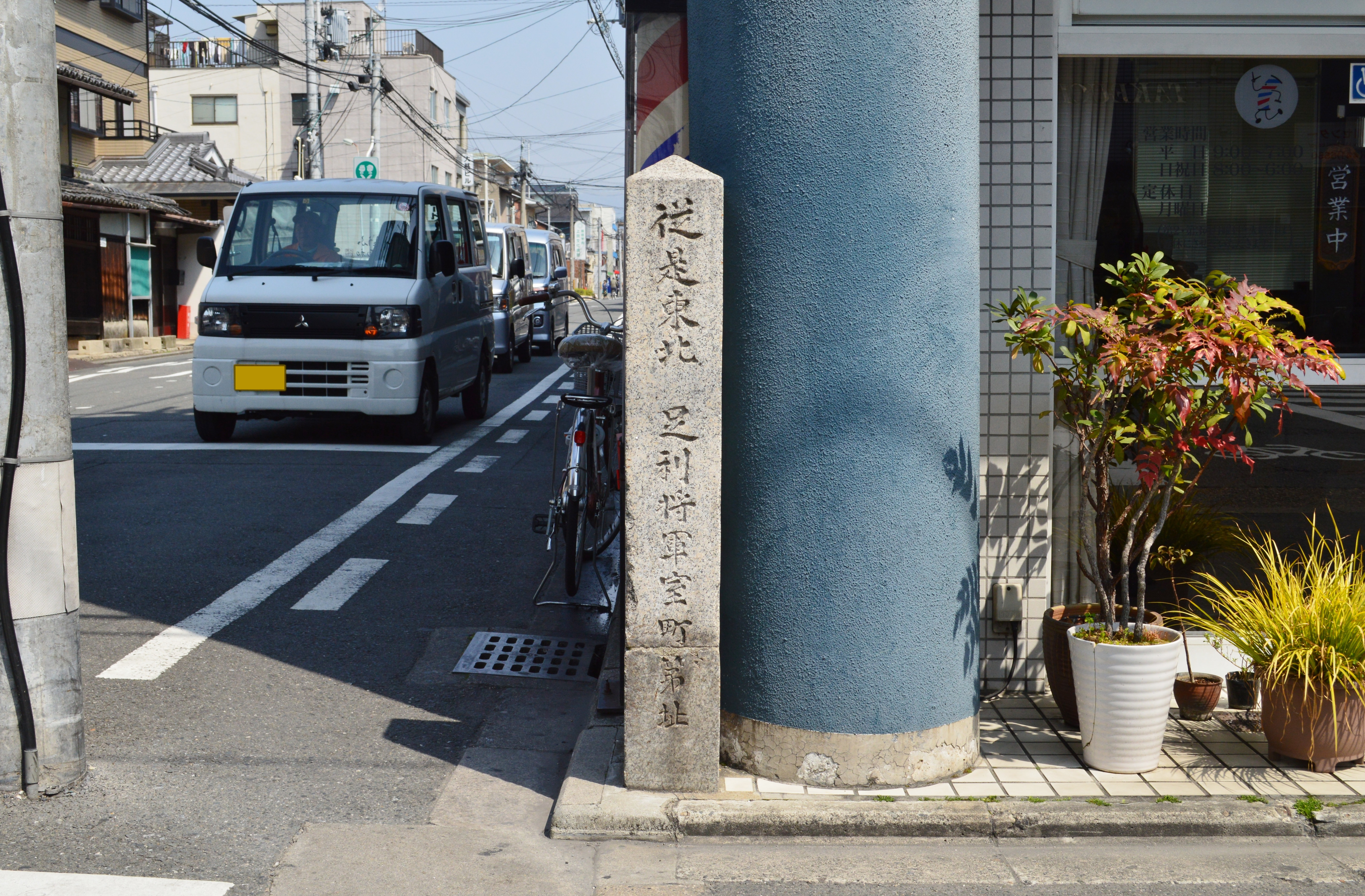
Marker for the site of the Flower Palace, Kyoto

.

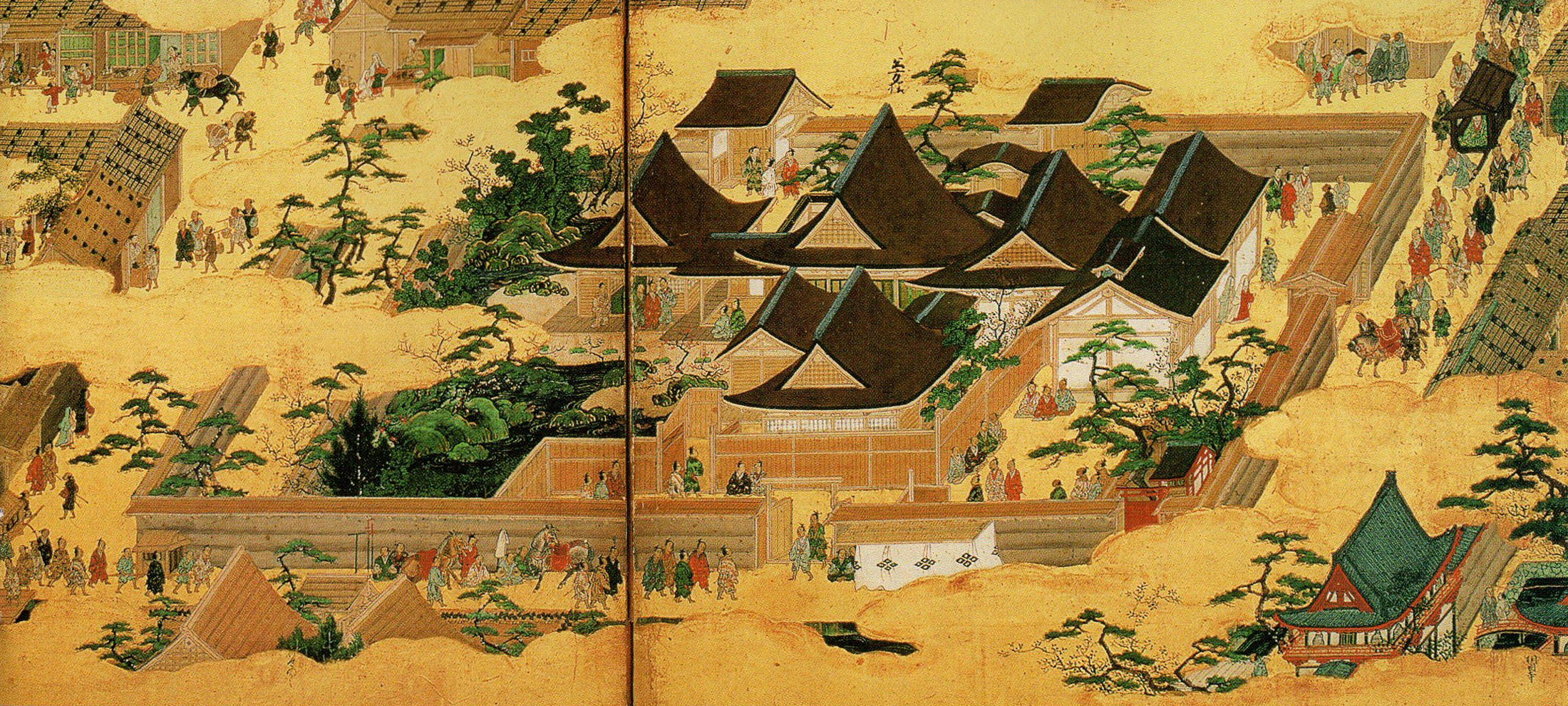
Hana no gosho, Flower Palace in 1565 painted by Kanō Eitoku.

The shogunal residence, also known as the "Flower Palace", was in Kyoto on the block now bounded by Karasuma Street (to the east), Imadegawa Street (to the south), Muromachi Street (to the west, giving the name), and Kamidachiuri Street (to the north). The location is commemorated by a stone marker at the southwest corner, and the Kanbai-kan (寒梅館; Winter Plum Hall) of Dōshisha University contains relics and excavations of the area.

== List of Ashikaga shōgun ==
1. Ashikaga Takauji, ruled 1338–1357
2. Ashikaga Yoshiakira, r. 1359–1368
3. Ashikaga Yoshimitsu, r. 1368–1394
4. Ashikaga Yoshimochi, r. 1395–1423
5. Ashikaga Yoshikazu, r. 1423–1425
  1. Responsibilities of government undertook by Ashikaga Yoshimochi, (1425–1428)
6. Ashikaga Yoshinori, r. 1428–1441
7. Ashikaga Yoshikatsu, r. 1442–1443
8. Ashikaga Yoshimasa, r. 1449–1473
9. Ashikaga Yoshihisa, r. 1474–1489
10. Ashikaga Yoshitane, r. 1490–1493, 1508–1521
11. Ashikaga Yoshizumi, r. 1494–1508
12. Ashikaga Yoshiharu, r. 1521–1546
13. Ashikaga Yoshiteru, r. 1546–1565
14. Ashikaga Yoshihide, r. 1568
15. Ashikaga Yoshiaki, r. 1568–1573

== See also ==
- Ashikaga clan
- History of Japan
- Japanese missions to Imperial China
- Kantō kubō
- Ōban (Great Watch)
