= Ōban (Great Watch) =

The Ōban (大番), usually translated as "Great Watch," was a contingent of troops dedicated to protecting the Home Provinces (畿内, kinai) and safeguarding the Throne. The Watch existed in one form or another across Japanese feudal history, serving under the Ashikaga shogunate as well as the Tokugawa.
