= Muromachi Street =

Street in Kyoto, Japan

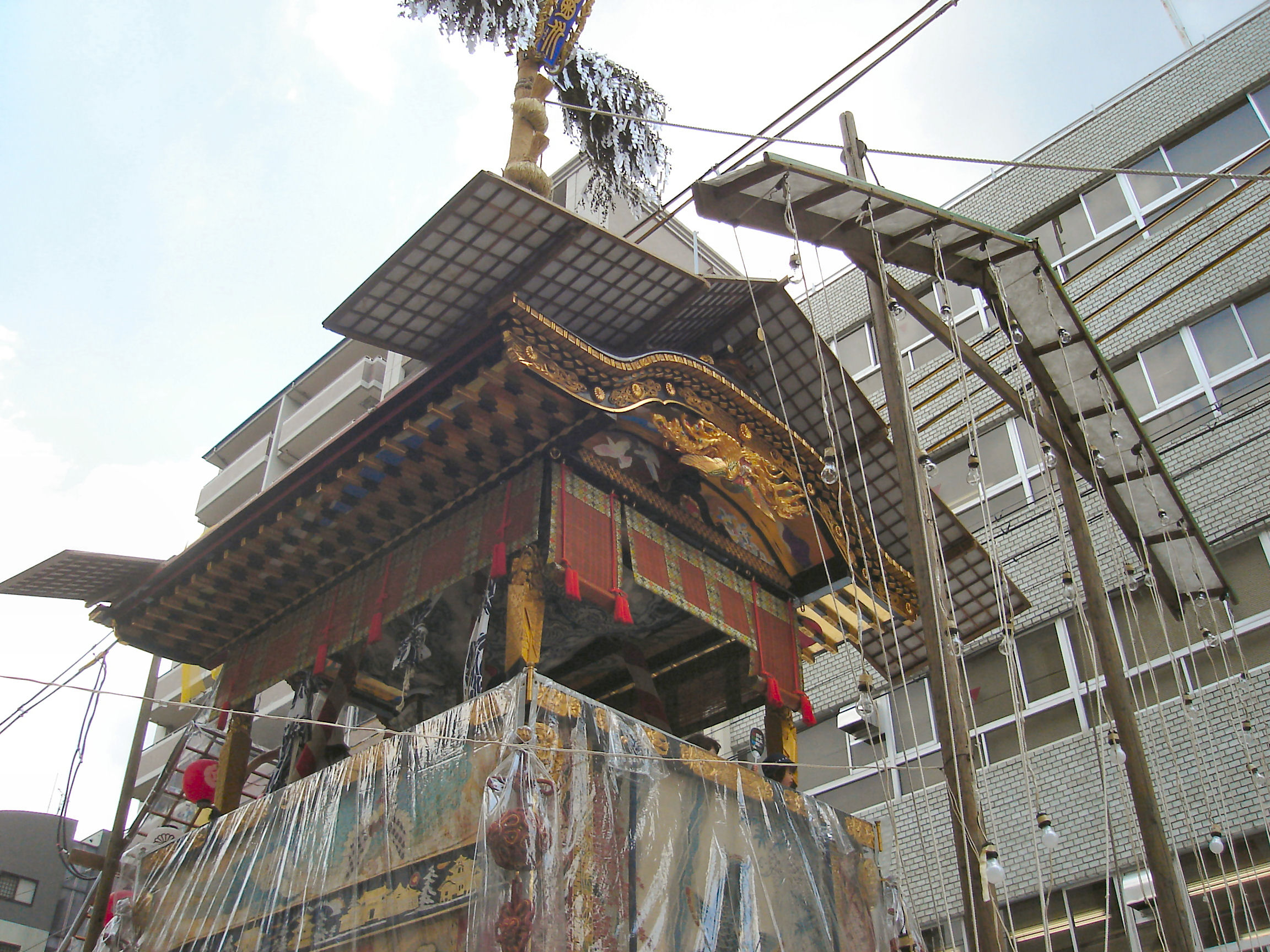
"Kikusuiboko" (菊水鉾), a yamaboko, under construction in Muromachi Street.

Muromachi Street (室町通, Muromachi-dōri) is a street in Kyoto, Japan. Originally a path called Muromachi kōji (室町小路) in Heian-kyō, the ancient capital that preceded Kyoto, it lies to the west of Karasuma Street (烏丸通) and runs north-south from Kitayama Street (北山通) in Kita-ku to Kuzebashi Street (久世橋通) in Minami-ku. En route, it is blocked by Higashi Hongan-ji Temple and Kyoto Station.

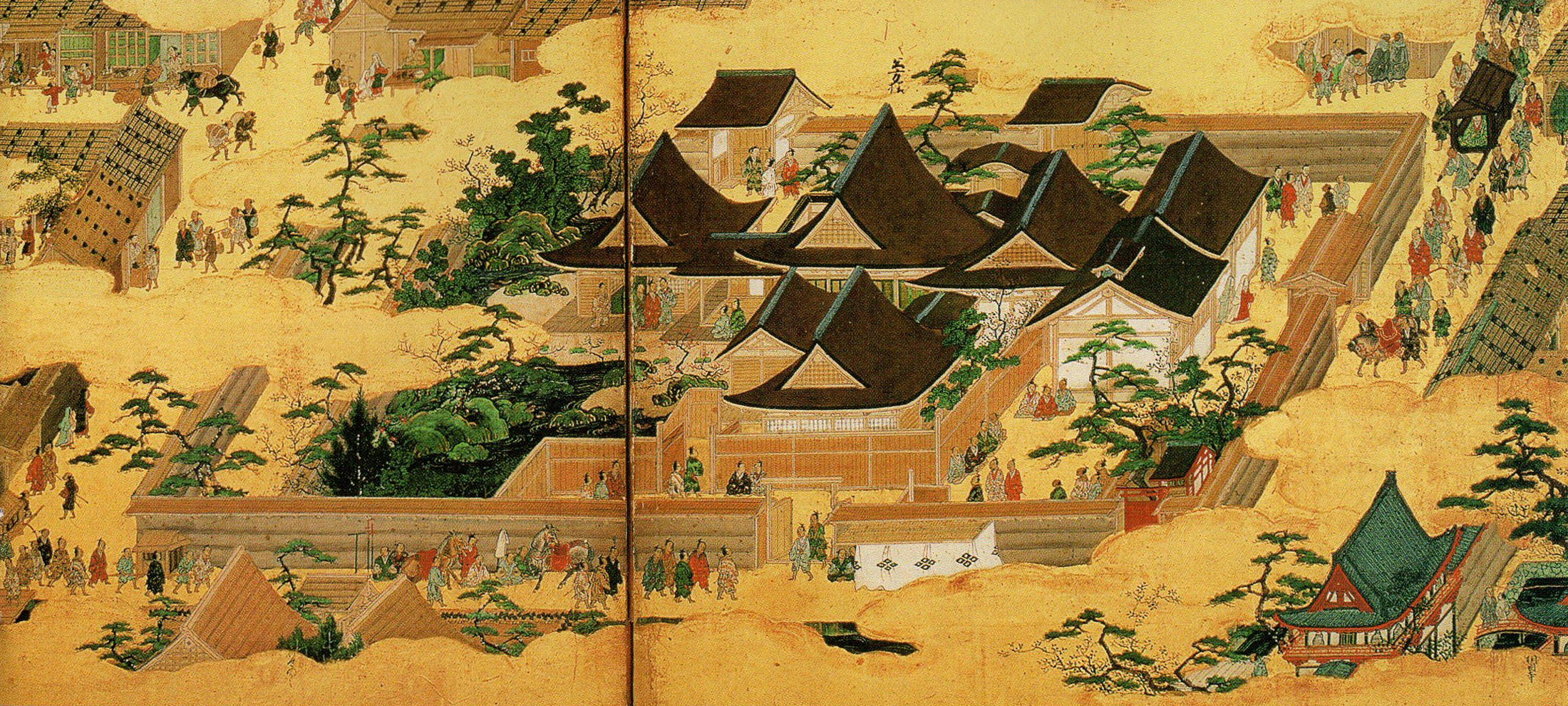
Hana-no Gosho palace.

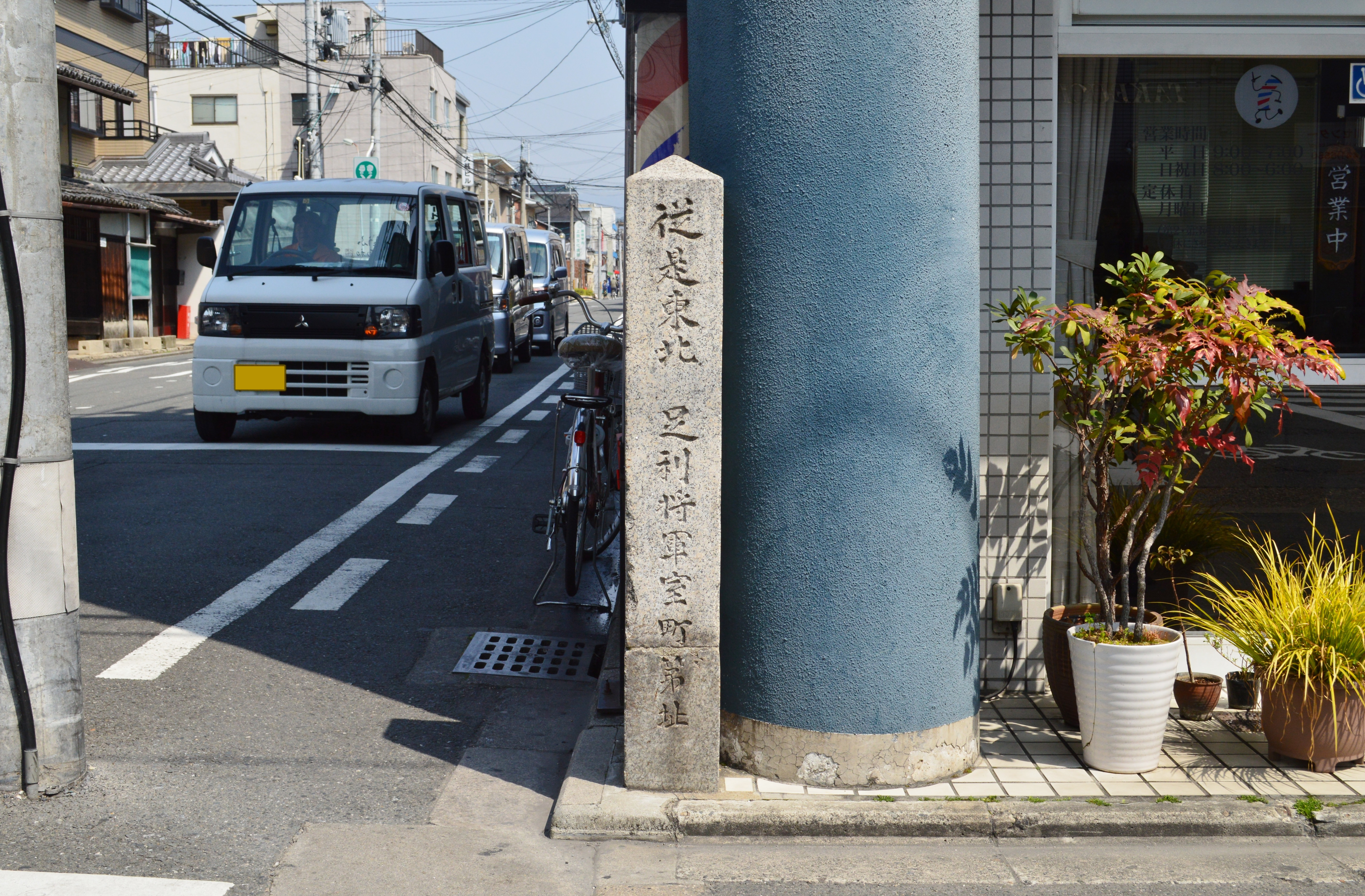
Muromachi bakufu site marker.

In 1378, near where Imadegawa Street now intersects Muromachi Street (Muromachi-dōri Imadegawa (室町通今出川)), (Note: Specifically, at the block now bounded by Karasuma Street, Imadegawa Street and Kamitachiuri Street.) the third shōgun Ashikaga Yoshimitsu established the Hana-no Gosho (花の御所, Flower Palace, also known as Muromachi-dono (室町殿, Muromachi Palace)), a luxurious palace that became the political and cultural center of the country. Today, its location is commemorated by a stone marker in what was its southwestern corner and relics from excavations in the area are held in the Kanbai-kan (寒梅館, Winter Plum Hall) of Dōshisha University. The Ashikaga (Muromachi) shogunate prospered until the Ōnin War (1467–1477), during which Kyoto disintegrated into the two areas Kamigyō and Shimogyō. After the war, Muromachi Street was the only road between them.

During the Edo period, Muromachi Street saw the growth of kimono wholesalers, some of which survive today. Each July, districts centered on the intersection between Muromachi Street and Shijō Street (Shijō Muromachi (四条室町)) in Shimogyō build floats (yamaboko (山鉾)) to parade during the Gion Matsuri festival.

== Establishments ==
Ritsumeikan Primary School	ja:立命館小学校
Muromachi Hospital	室町病院
Dōshisha University
Kamigyo Junior High School	上京中学校
Heian Jogakuin University
St. Agnes Junior High and High School	ja:平安女学院中学校・高等学校
Kyoto Art Center	ja:京都芸術センター
Ikenobo College
Higashi Hongan-ji

== See also ==
- ja:京都市内の通り
