= Hosokawa clan =

Japanese samurai clan

Hosokawa 細川
- The emblem (mon) of the Hosokawa clan
- Home province: Various
- Parent house: Minamoto clan Ashikaga clan
- Titles: Various
- Founder: Ashikaga Yoshisue
- Current head: Morihiro Hosokawa
- Dissolution: still extant
- Ruled until: 1947, Constitution of Japan renders titles obsolete
- Cadet branches: Nagaoka clan Kumamoto; Kumamoto-Shinden; Udo; Hitachi-Yatabe; Saikyu clan

The Hosokawa clan (細川氏, Hosokawa-shi; Japanese pronunciation: [hò̞.só̞.kä̀.β̞ä̀, -kä́.β̞ä́]) is a Japanese samurai kin group or clan. The clan descends from the Seiwa Genji, a branch of the Minamoto clan, and ultimately from Emperor Seiwa, through the Ashikaga clan. It produced many prominent officials in the Ashikaga shogunate's administration. In the Edo period, the clan was one of the largest landholding daimyo families in Japan. The current clan head Morihiro Hosokawa served as Prime Minister of Japan.

== Muromachi and Sengoku periods ==
Ashikaga Yoshisue, son of Ashikaga Yoshizane, was the first to take the surname of Hosokawa. Hosokawa Yoriharu, a Hosokawa of the late Kamakura period, fought for the Ashikaga clan against the Kamakura shogunate. Another, Hosokawa Akiuji, helped establish the Ashikaga shogunate.

The clan wielded significant power over the course of the Muromachi (1336–1467), Sengoku (1467–1600), and Edo periods, moving, however, from Shikoku, to Kinai, and then to Kyūshū over the centuries.

The clan was also one of three families to dominate the post of Kanrei (Shōgun's deputy), under the Ashikaga shogunate. One such individual was Hosokawa Yoriyuki. At the beginning of the Ashikaga's rule, the Hosokawa were given control of the entirety of Shikoku. Over the course of this period, members of the Hosokawa clan were Constables (shugo) of Awa, Awaji, Bitchū, Izumi, Sanuki, Settsu, Tanba, Tosa, and Yamashiro Provinces.

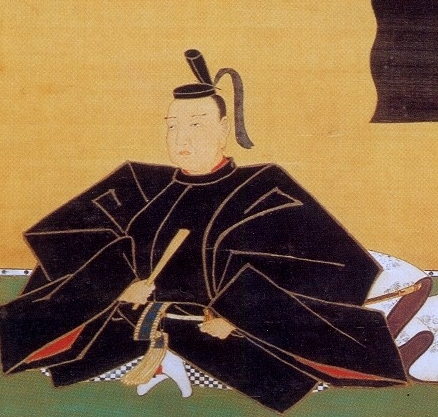
Hosokawa Tadaoki, retainer of Oda Nobunaga and Toyotomi Hideyoshi

A conflict between Hosokawa Katsumoto, the fifth Kanrei, and his father-in-law Yamana Sōzen, over the shogunate's succession, sparked the Ōnin War, which led to the fall of the shogunate and a period of 150 years of chaos and war, known as the Sengoku period. Following the fall of the Ashikaga shogunate, which was based in Kyoto, control of the city, and thus ostensibly the country, fell into the hands of the Hosokawa clan (who held the post of Kyoto Kanrei – Shōgun's deputy in Kyoto) for a few generations.

Katsumoto's son, Hosokawa Masamoto, held power in this way at the end of the 15th century, but was assassinated in 1507. After his death, the clan became divided and was weakened by internecine fighting. What power they still had, however, was centered in and around Kyoto. This gave them the leverage to consolidate their power to some extent, and came to be strong rivals with the Ōuchi clan, both politically, and in terms of dominating trade with Ming China. The Hosokawa remained in Kyoto for roughly one hundred years, fleeing the city when it was attacked by lord Oda Nobunaga. Another division of the clan whom many believed became extinct is the Saikyū clan (細九氏).

== Edo period ==
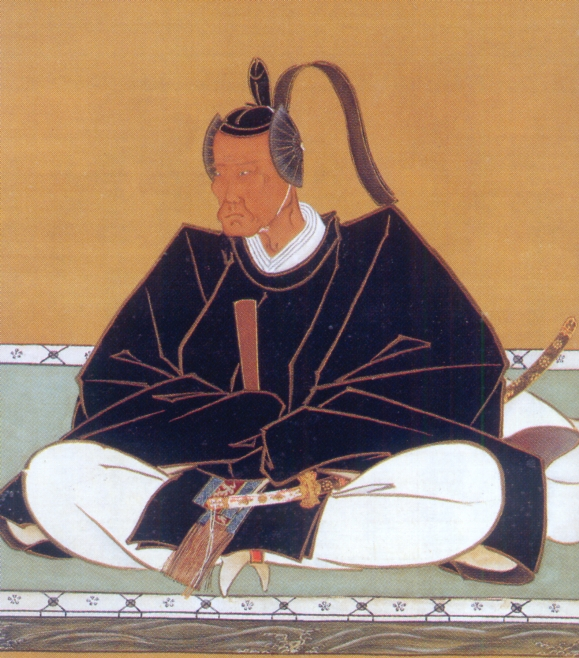
Hosokawa Shigekata, mid-Edo period daimyō of the Kumamoto domain

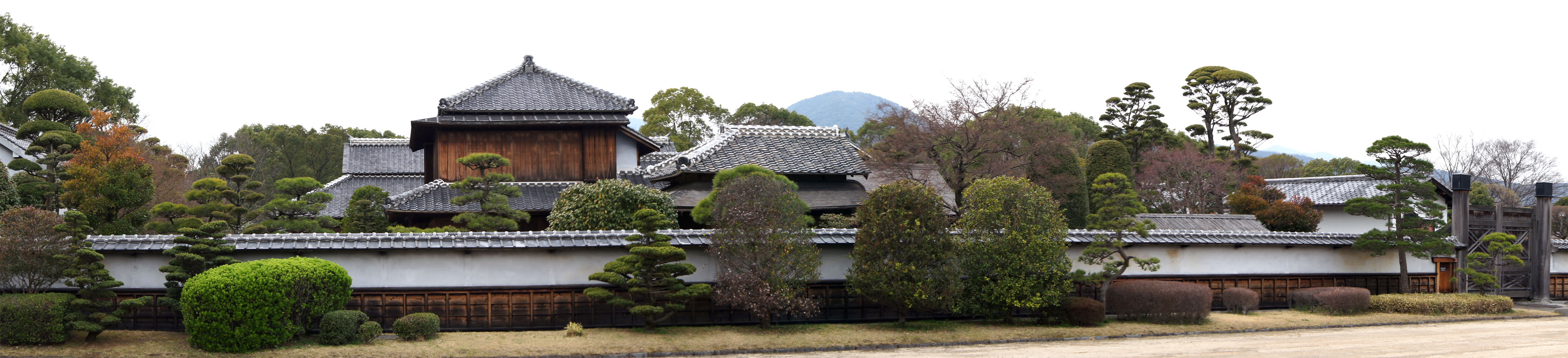
Hosokawa Gyōbu mansion

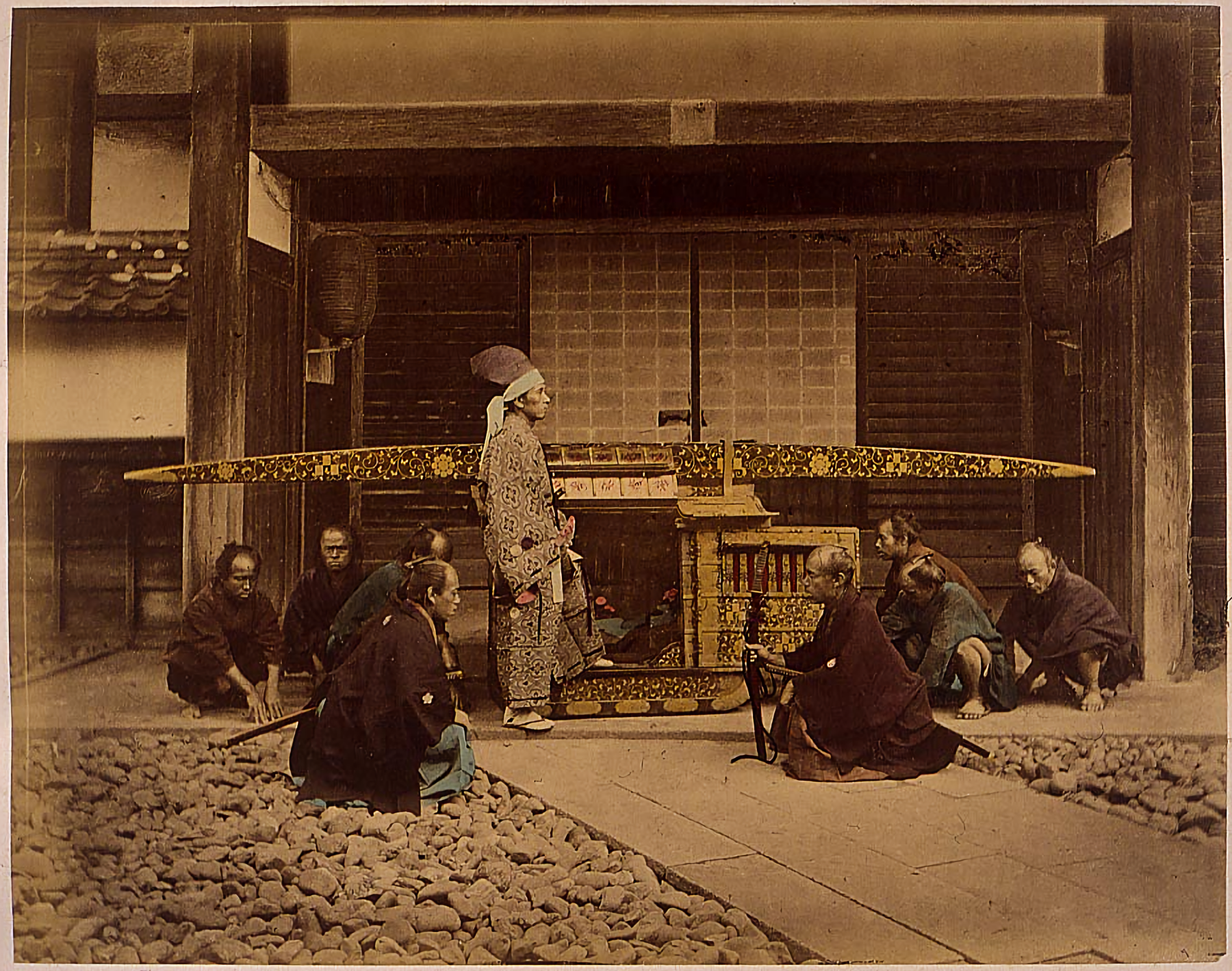
Samurai lord and a palanquin with the Hosokawa kuyo-mon

The Hosokawa of Kokura (later Kumamoto) became the "main" line of the Hosokawa clan during the Edo period. Hosokawa Gracia, the wife of Hosokawa Tadaoki, was one of the most famous samurai converts to Christianity; she was also the daughter of Akechi Mitsuhide.

The Hosokawa sided with Tokugawa Ieyasu against Ishida Mitsunari during the decisive Sekigahara Campaign, and thus were made fudai (inside) daimyō under the Tokugawa shogunate. They were given Higo Province, with an income of 540,000 koku, as their han (fief).

Hosokawa Tadatoshi, the third lord of Kumamoto, was the patron of the artist and swordsman Miyamoto Musashi.

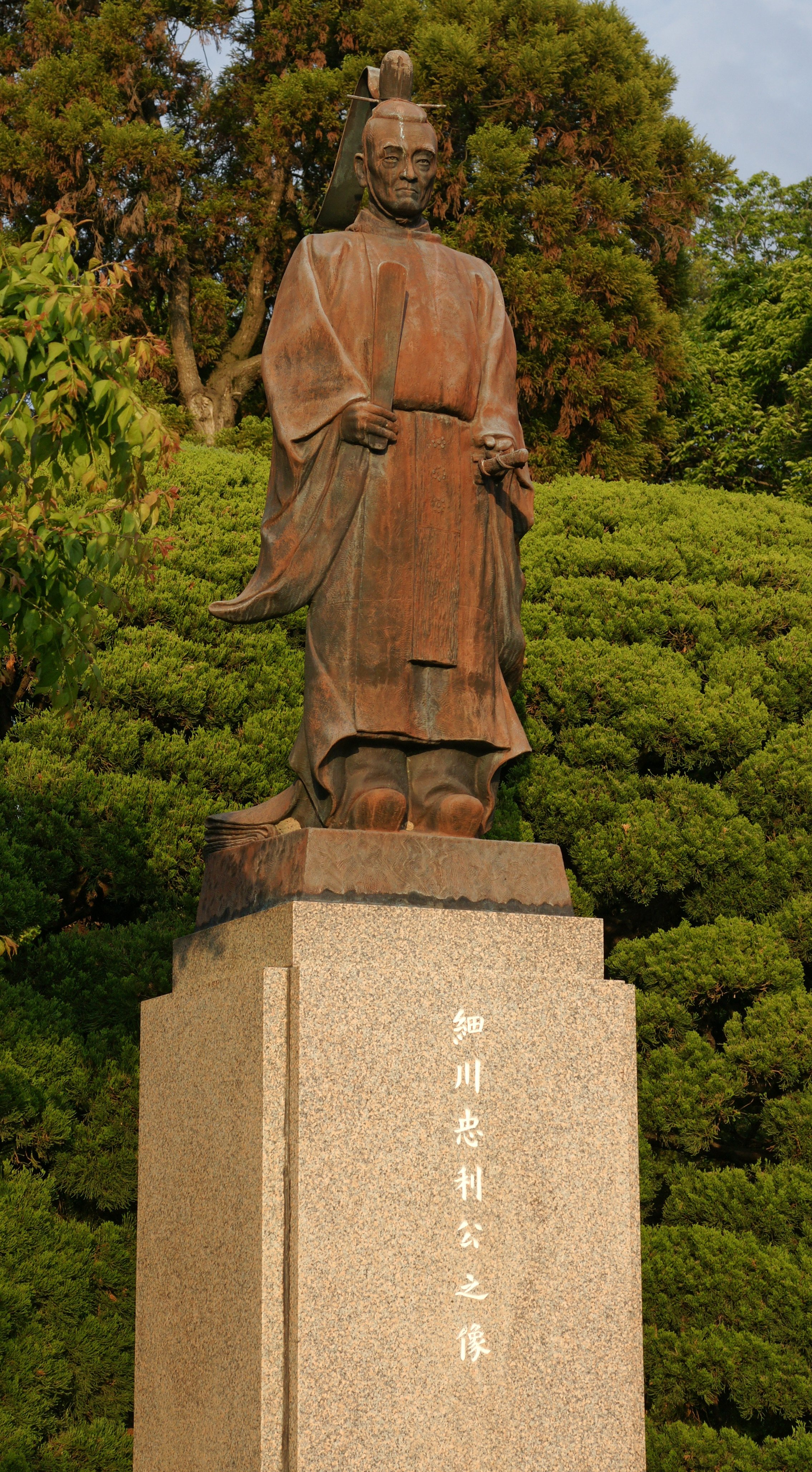
Statue of Hosokawa Tadatoshi within Suizen-ji Jōju-en

Mon of Miyamoto Musashi born in Ōhara-chō province of Mimasaka

Though the Hosokawa domain was far from both the shogunate and imperial capital, on Kyūshū, they were among the wealthiest of the daimyōs. By 1750, Higo was one of the top producers of rice, and was in fact counted as a standard by the Osaka rice brokers. The domain suffered from serious economic decline after that, as most domains did, but the sixth lord, Hosokawa Shigekata (1718–1785, r. 1747–1785) instituted a number of reforms which turned the situation around. He also founded a Han school, Jishūkan, in 1755.

In later years, it produced many scholars such as Yokoi Shōnan.

In 1787, the main family line descended from Tadatoshi became extinct with the death of the 7th lord, Shigekata's son Harutoshi (1758–1787; r. 1785–1787). He was succeeded by his distant cousin Narishige, the sixth Lord of Udo (1755–c1835, r. 1787–1810) a direct descendant of Tadatoshi's younger brother Tatsutaka (1615–1645). In 1810, Narishige abdicated his title in favor of his elder son Naritatsu (1788–1826, r. 1810–1826), who succeeded as the ninth lord of Kumamoto. Naritatsu died without an heir in 1826, and was succeeded by his nephew Narimori (1804–1860, r. 1826–1860), the son of Naritatsu's younger brother Tatsuyuki (1784–1818), who was the seventh lord of Udo.

Following the death of Narimori in 1860, his elder son Yoshikuni (1835–1876, r. 1860–1871) succeeded him as the eleventh and final ruling lord of Kumamoto.

There were four major branches of the Hosokawa clan in the Edo period, each of which held the title of daimyō. Another two branches of the family, under the Nagaoka surname, served the Hosokawa of Kumamoto as karō. The residence of one of those families, Hosokawa Gyōbu mansion (細川刑部邸, Hosokawa Gyōbu-tei), is still extant, and is a Tangible Cultural Property of Kumamoto Prefecture.

== Boshin War ==
During the Boshin War of 1868–69, the Hosokawa of Kumamoto, Kumamoto-Shinden, and Udo sided with the imperial government. Its forces took part in the Battle of Aizu and the Battle of Hakodate, among others.

== Meiji and beyond ==
Following the abolition of the feudal class in 1871, the Hosokawa clan and its branches were made part of the new nobility in the Meiji era. The head of the main family line (Kumamoto) was given the hereditary title of marquis (kōshaku), while the heads of the secondary branches became viscounts (shishaku); the titles became obsolete in 1947. The present head of the main family line, Morihiro Hosokawa, former Prime Minister of Japan, is a descendant of the Hosokawa of Kumamoto.

== Ancestors ==
1. Emperor Jimmu
2. Emperor Suizei
3. Emperor Annei
4. Emperor Itoku
5. Emperor Kōshō
6. Emperor Kōan
7. Emperor Kōrei
8. Emperor Kōgen
9. Emperor Kaika
10. Emperor Sujin
11. Emperor Suinin
12. Emperor Keikō
13. Yamato Takeru
14. Emperor Chūai
15. Emperor Ōjin
16. Wakanuke Futamata no Kimi
17. Ohohoto no Kimi
18. Ohi no Kimi
19. Ushi no Kimi
20. Emperor Keitai
21. Emperor Kinmei
22. Emperor Bidatsu
23. Prince Oshisaka
24. Emperor Jomei
25. Emperor Tenji
26. Prince Shiki
27. Emperor Kōnin
28. Emperor Kanmu
29. Emperor Saga
30. Emperor Ninmyō
31. Emperor Montoku
32. Emperor Seiwa
33. Prince Sadazumi
34. Minamoto no Tsunemoto
35. Minamoto no Mitsunaka
36. Minamoto no Yorinobu
37. Minamoto no Yoriyoshi
38. Minamoto no Yoshiie
39. Minamoto no Yoshikuni
40. Minamoto no Yoshiyasu
41. (Ashikaga) Minamoto no Yoshikiyo
42. (Hirosawa) Ashikaga Yoshizane
43. (Ashikaga) Hosokawa Yoshisue

== Key genealogies ==
=== Main branch ===
1. Hosokawa Yoshisue
2. Hosokawa Akiuji (adopted)
3. Hosokawa Kimiyori
4. Hosokawa Kazuuji (1296–1342)
5. Hosokawa Kiyouji (d.1362)
6. Hosokawa Yoriyuki
7. Hosokawa Yorimoto (1343–1397)
8. Hosokawa Mitsumoto (1378–1426)
9. Hosokawa Mochimoto (1399–1429)
10. Hosokawa Mochiyuki (1400–1442)
11. Hosokawa Katsumoto
12. Hosokawa Masamoto
13. Hosokawa Sumiyuki (1489–1507)
14. Hosokawa Sumimoto
15. Hosokawa Takakuni
16. Hosokawa Tanekuni (1508–1525)
17. Hosokawa Harumoto
18. Hosokawa Ujitsuna (1514–1564)
19. Hosokawa Akimoto (1548–1615)
20. Hosokawa Motokatsu (1561–1628)
21. Hosokawa Yoshimoto

Kumamoto (Became Main Branch)

1. Hosokawa Fujitaka
2. Hosokawa Tadaoki
3. Hosokawa Tadatoshi
4. Hosokawa Mitsunao
5. Hosokawa Tsunatoshi (1643–1714)
6. Hosokawa Nobunori (1676–1732)
7. Hosokawa Munetaka (1716–1747)
8. Hosokawa Shigekata
9. Hosokawa Harutoshi (1758–1787)
10. Hosokawa Narishige (1755–1835)
11. Hosokawa Naritatsu (1797–1826)
12. Hosokawa Narimori (1804–1860)
13. Hosokawa Yoshikuni (1835–1876) – Last ruling Lord of Kumamoto
14. Hosokawa Morihisa, 1st Marquis (1839–1893) (created 1884)
15. Hosokawa Morishige, 2nd Marquis (1868–1914)
16. Hosokawa Moritatsu, 3rd Marquis (title made obsolete in 1947) (1883–1970)
17. Hosokawa Morisada, titular 5th Marquis (1912–2005)
18. Morihiro Hosokawa, titular 6th Marquis (born 1938)
19. Morimitsu Hosokawa, heir (born 1972)

=== Branches ===
Kumamoto-Shinden (Takase)

- Hosokawa Toshishige (1647–1687)
- Hosokawa Toshimasa (1672–1715)
- Hosokawa Toshiyasu (1701–1749)
- Hosokawa Toshihiro (1716–1767)
- Hosokawa Toshiyuki (1750–1781)
- Hosokawa Toshitsune (1754–1805)
- Hosokawa Toshikuni (1784–1810)
- Hosokawa Toshichika (1788–1844)
- Hosokawa Toshimochi (1808–1864)
- Hosokawa Toshinaga (1829–1901)
- Hosokawa Toshisuke
- Hosokawa Teruko (1937–)
- Hosokawa Kendi (1960–)
- Hosokawa Sachiko (1990–)

Udo

- Hosokawa Yukitaka (1637–1690)
- Hosokawa Aritaka (1676–1733)
- Hosokawa Okinari (1699–1737)
- Hosokawa Okisato (1722–1745)
- Hosokawa Okinori (1723–1785)
- Hosokawa Tatsuhiro (1755–1835)
- Hosokawa Tatsuyuki (1784–1818)
- Hosokawa Tatsumasa (1804–1860)
- Hosokawa Yukika (1811–1876)
- Hosokawa Tatsunori (1832–1888)
- Hosokawa Yukizane (1842–1902)

Hitachi-Yatabe

- Hosokawa Okimoto (1564–1619)
- Hosokawa Okimasa (1604–1643)
- Hosokawa Okitaka (1632–1690)
- Hosokawa Okinaga (1658–1737)
- Hosokawa Okizane (1687–1728)
- Hosokawa Okitora (1710–1737)
- Hosokawa Okiharu (1737–1794)
- Hosokawa Okinori (1759–1837)
- Hosokawa Okitatsu (1798–1855)
- Hosokawa Okitsura (1832–1907)
- Hosokawa Okitsugu
- Hosokawa Okiharu

== See also ==
- Matsui Okinaga
- Miyamoto Musashi
- Kumamoto Castle
- History of Kumamoto Prefecture
- Tōrin-in, former family temple
