= Ebina Danjo =

Japanese Christian missionary and educator

- 海老名弾正
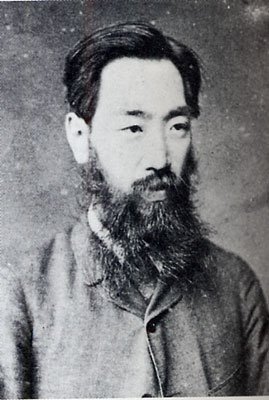
- Born: September 18, 1856
- Died: May 22, 1937 (aged 80)
- Occupation(s): Christian missionary, educator, philosopher, pastor, and president of Doshisha University

Ebina Danjo (海老名 弾正) (September 18, 1856 – May 22, 1937) was a Japanese educator and philosopher, as well as a Christian missionary and pastor. He was known for his "Shintoistic Christianity", and served as the president of Doshisha University.

== Biography ==
=== Early life ===
Ebina was born on September 18, 1856, in Yanagawa Domain, Chikugo province (modern-day Fukuoka Prefecture). He studied at the Kumamoto Yogakko, where he was part of the group later known as the Kumamoto Band. He was baptized by Leroy Lansing Janes in 1876, after Japan's ban on Christianity was lifted in 1874.

In autumn of 1876, Ebina transferred to Doshisha University, where he studied under Joseph Hardy Neesima. At Neesima's recommendation, in 1877 Ebina spent the summer in Annaka, Kozuke Province working as a missionary. His sermons were well-received, and 50-60 young men would gather to listen to him. Ebina returned in 1878, and invited Neesima to come with him. He baptized 30 people, and they founded the Annaka Church.

=== Pastor ===
Ebina graduated from Doshisha in 1879, and returned to Annaka Church as its pastor. Before he left, Neesima laid his hands on him.

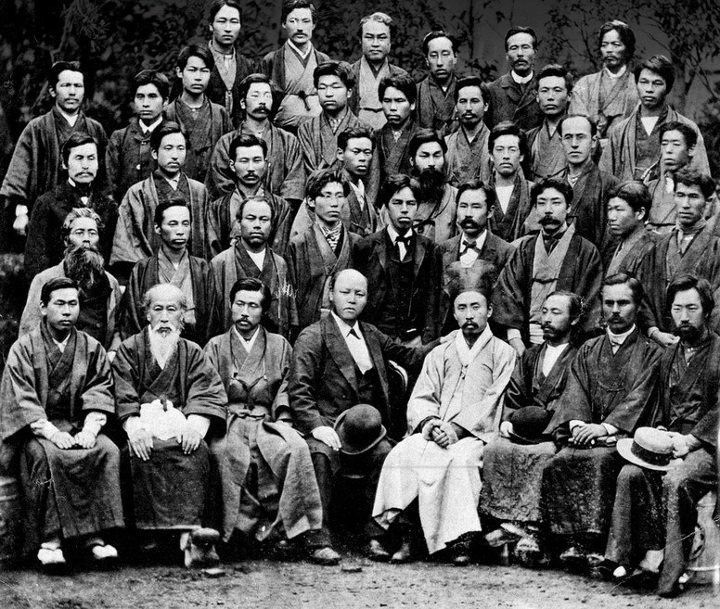
In this photo of the 1883 All-Japan Christian Conference, Ebina is in first row on the far right.

In 1882, Ebina married Miya Yokoi, Yokoi Shonan's oldest daughter. In May 1883, Ebina went to Kyoto to lead the 3rd All-Japan Christian Conference with his brother-in-law, Tokio Yokoi and Miyagawa Tsuneteru.

In 1884, Ebina moved to Maebashi, Gunma and founded the Maebashi Church. A couple years later, in 1886, he began preaching in Tokyo, and started the Hongo Congregational Church. He eventually entrusted the church to Tokio Yokoi, and returned to Kumamoto. Once there, he founded the Kumamoto Girls' School and the Kumamoto English School.

Ebina became the president of the Japanese Christian Mission company(日本基督教伝道会社) in 1890. With Miyagawa Tsuneteru and Kozaki Hiromichi, he was called one of the "Three Elders" of the Kumiai Church. In 1893 he became the pastor at the Kobe Church until he moved to Tokyo in 1897 and resumed his pastorship at Hongo Congregational Church.

In 1900, Ebina began publishing a magazine called "Shinjin (新人)". Working with Yoshino Sakuzo, Uchigasaki Sakusaburo, Fukuda Yasukazu, and Suzuki Bunji, the magazine gained a lot of attention among Japanese philosophers and Christians.

In 1916, he earned a doctorate in divinity from the Pacific Theological Seminary, and in 1924 he received an honorary doctorate in law from Pomona College.

=== President of Doshisha University ===
In 1920, Ebina began working as the eighth president of Doshisha University. While he began his tenure by overhauling the university's financial system, which caused friction with the Board of Directors, who had vested interests in many parts of the university. During this time, Ebina's health worsened until he had to undergo treatment in 1928. On November 23, when he was still in the hospital, a fire broke out in a classroom, causing a riot. Two days later, on November 25, the entire Board resigned, leaving Ebina with sole responsibility over the incident. He returned to Hongo Congregational church and served as its pastor until he died on May 22, 1937.

== Selected bibliography ==
- Ebina, Danjo (1919). The influence of America on the reconstruction of Japan. San Francisco: T. Chiba.

== See also ==
- Japanese Congregational Christian Church
