= Masatada =

Masatada is a surname and first name. Notable people with it include:

- Amari Masatada, a samurai
- Kujō Masatada, a kugyō
- Masatada Tsuchiya, a politician
- Masatada Ishii, a footballer and manager
- Masatada Yamasaki, a gynecologist
- Fujiwara no Masatada, a poet
- Ōkōchi Masatada, a daimyō
