= Masatada Yamasaki =

Japanese gynecologist (1872–1950)

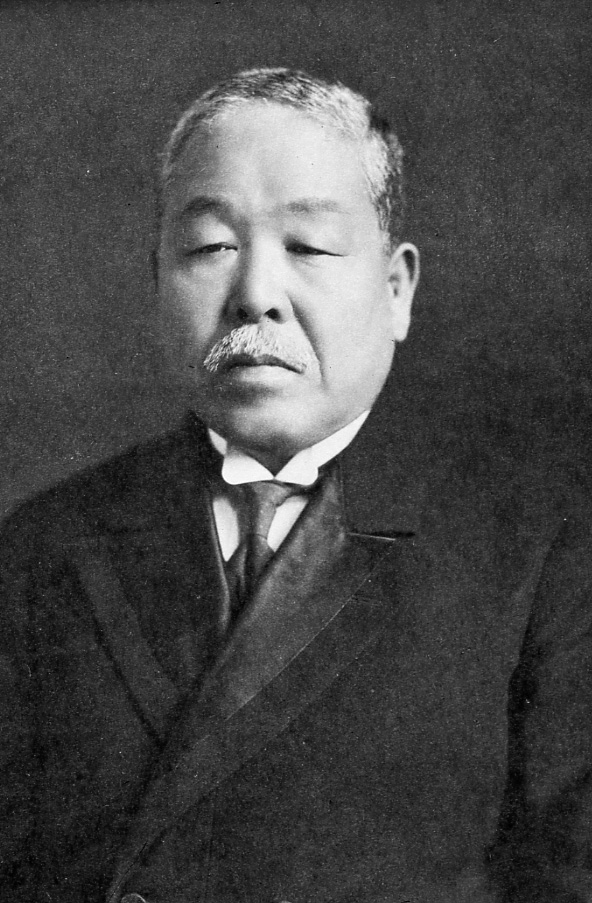
- Born: June 16, 1872; Kōchi Prefecture
- Died: May 29, 1950 (aged 77)
- Occupation: Physician (Gynecologist)
- Known for: First President of Kumamoto Medical College,(1925-1932), The books History of Medical Education in Kumamoto and Yokoi Shōnan

Masatada Yamasaki (山崎 正董, Yamasaki Masatada; June 16, 1872 – May 29, 1950) was a Japanese gynecologist and president of Kumamoto Medical College (1925–1932). He wrote The history of medical education in Higo (Kumamoto) and Yokoi Shōnan. After retirement, he travelled in Okinawa.

== Life ==
He was born in Sagawa town, Takaoka gun, Kōchi Prefecture on 11 May 1872. After graduation from Tokyo Imperial University in 1900, he became professor at private Kumamoto Medical School in 1901. In 1909 and 1910, he studied at the Ludwig-Maximilians-Universität München and the University of Bonn. He was appointed the president of Aichi Medical School in 1916. In 1925, he was appointed the president of Kumamoto Medical College and director of the Hospital. In 1929, he wrote The history of medical education in Higo (Kumamoto). In 1932, he retired from the Kumamoto Medical College. In 1932 and 1933, he travelled in Okinawa and on 29 May 1950 he died in his house.

== Okinawa ==
Originally interested in history and travelling, he retired at age 60 from the university and travelled to Okinawa in 1932 and 1933. In 1932, a cameraman accompanied him and in 1933 he was accompanied by his wife, son, a cameraman and an artist. Many physicians who studied in his universities helped him (he used the Governor's car). Fortunately, photographs of various scenes taken during his journey in Okinawa in 1932 and 1933, mostly in historical spots, were discovered and published in 2000. Since Okinawa was hit badly by the last war, these photographs were considered of inestimable value. The inclusion of himself in photographs served as a measure of various buildings.

== Medical education in Higo (Kumamoto) ==
His famous book, Medical education in Higo dates back to 1758 when Saishunkan was established. This book has more than 800 pages.

== Yokoi Shōnan ==
He studied Yokoi Shōnan and his book got a renewed interest. 2009 marked the 200th year after the birth of Yokoi Shōnan. This book has more than 1300 pages.

- Yokoi Shōnan, the Foremost World-Pacifist in Japan (1949), Dr. M. Yamasaki, Kumamoto Education Board
  - A Moemorial Lecture by Dr. M. Yamasaki
    - (Beginning) Motoda Toya (1801-1880), Yokoi Shōnan's devoted disciple and friend, exalted him as an unrivalled master of moral philosophy and a scholar suitable to be an Emperor's instructor, and adds, "I have made friends with many persons of repute in my life, but really can I remamber none with so broad a view and so highspirited as Yokoi, my instructor. His clear judgement and keen observation can hardly be attained by others". Nagaoka Moriyoshi(1842-1906), one of his bosom friends, wrote a sonnet in praise of Yokoi in which he says, "Who on earth would dare to compete with him for gift and talent ?"
    - Katsu Kaishu(1823-1899), known to have had a very high opinion of his own wit and discernment, had to confess that Yokoi was surprisingly broadminded and towered above his contemporaries. He says, "During the eventful years of my life, I have come across two really formidable persons to deal with, namely, Saigo Nanshu(1827-1877) and Yokoi Shonan. Well, Yokoi's knowledge of the world affairs was by no means rich, so I had been very often his teacher in that respect. On the other hand, his hightoned thinking and imagination was far beyond my reach."

== Memorials ==
- The Yamasaki Memorial House is inside the campus of the Medical Department, Kumamoto University. It houses a bronze statue of Dr. Yamasaki.
- His tomb is in Komine Memorial Park, Kurokami, Kumamoto.

== Footnotes ==
- Photo album, "Beloved Okinawa. Scenes in early Showa period when Masatada Yamasaki walked" (2000), Takao Nonomura, Ryukyushinpo, Naha.
