= Kozaki Hiromichi =

Japanese Christian minister (1856–1938)

- 小崎弘道
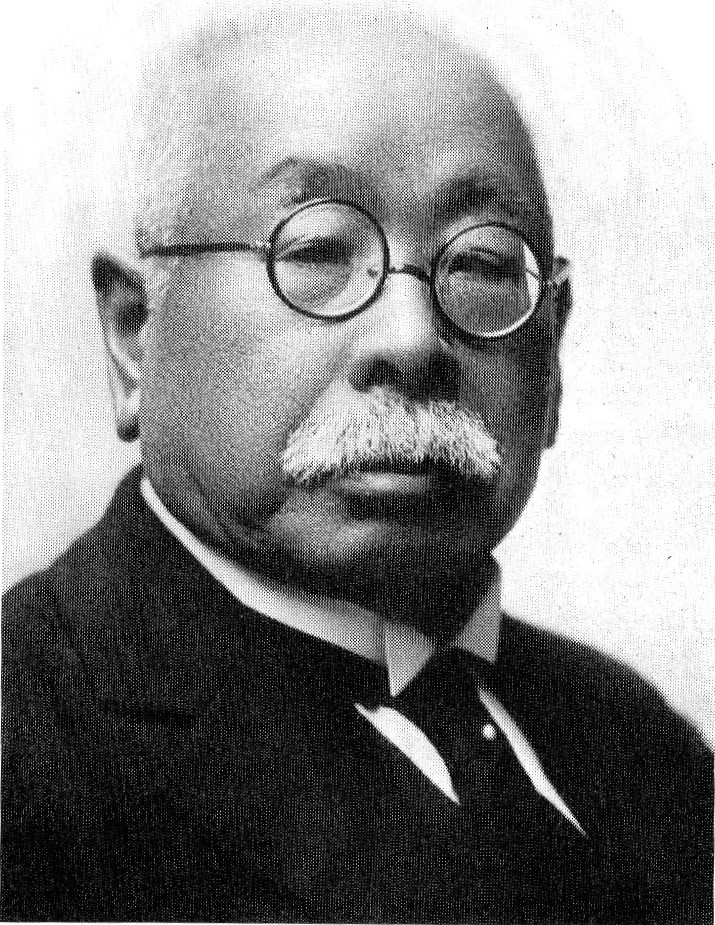
- Born: May 17, 1856; Kumamoto, Kumamoto Prefecture, Japan
- Died: February 26, 1938 (aged 81); Chigasaki, Kanagawa, Japan
- Education: Kumamoto Yogakko, Doshisha English School
- Occupations: Japanese Christian minister, University president
- Spouse: Chiyo Imamura
- Children: Michio Kozaki

Kozaki Hiromichi (小崎 弘道, Kozaki Hiromichi; May 17, 1856 – February 26, 1938) was a Japanese Christian minister. Kozaki was called one of the "Three Elders" of the Kumiai Church alongside Miyagawa Tsuneteru and Ebina Danjo. He was the second president of Doshisha University.

== Early life ==
Kozaki was born in what is now Kumamoto on May 17, 1856. He was the second son in a samurai family. He began his studies at the Jishūkan, then entered the Kumamoto Yogakko in 1871. He was strongly opposed to Christianity when he entered the school, and held on to Confucianism. However, in 1876, he was baptized by Leroy Lansing Janes and joined the Kumamoto Band, but kept his Confucianist beliefs. The Kumamoto Yogakko closed that year, so Kozaki transferred to Doshisha English School, where he met Joseph Hardy Neesima. He graduated in June 1879, and went to Hyuga province to do missionary work with Neesima.

== Career ==
In October 1879, Kozaki went to Tokyo and founded a church. In March 1880, he became the first president of the Japanese YMCA. In the same year he began publishing the Rokugo Zasshi, and later in 1883 he began publishing the Kirisuto-kyo Shinbun. In 1886 he published his first major work, the Seikyo Shinron, in which he criticized Confucianism and said that Christianity should be Japan's main religion. He also founded two new churches that year, the Reinanzaka and the Bancho Church.

Kozaki married Tsuda Sen's great-niece, Imamura Chiyo, in 1881. They had a son, Michio Kozaki, in 1888.

In 1892 Kozaki became the president Doshisa University and of the Doshisha, which is the parent organization of all of the Doshisha schools, from Doshisha elementary to Doshisha University. In 1893, he represented Japanese Christians at the World Parliament of Religions in Chicago. While he was in the United States he studied theology at Yale University for eight months. When he returned, he found a growing tension between Doshisha and the American Board of Commissioners for Foreign Missions, which culminated in the Board ending their partnership with Doshisha in 1896. Kozaki took responsibility for the turmoil this caused the school, and resigned. Tokio Yokoi became the next president.

Kozaki returned to his churches in Tokyo, where he continued to write, preach, and conduct missions overseas. He died of old age in Chigasaki, Kanagawa on February 26, 1938.

== See also ==
- Japanese Congregational Christian Church
