= Kumamoto Band =

Informal Meiji-era group of Japanese Protestant Christians

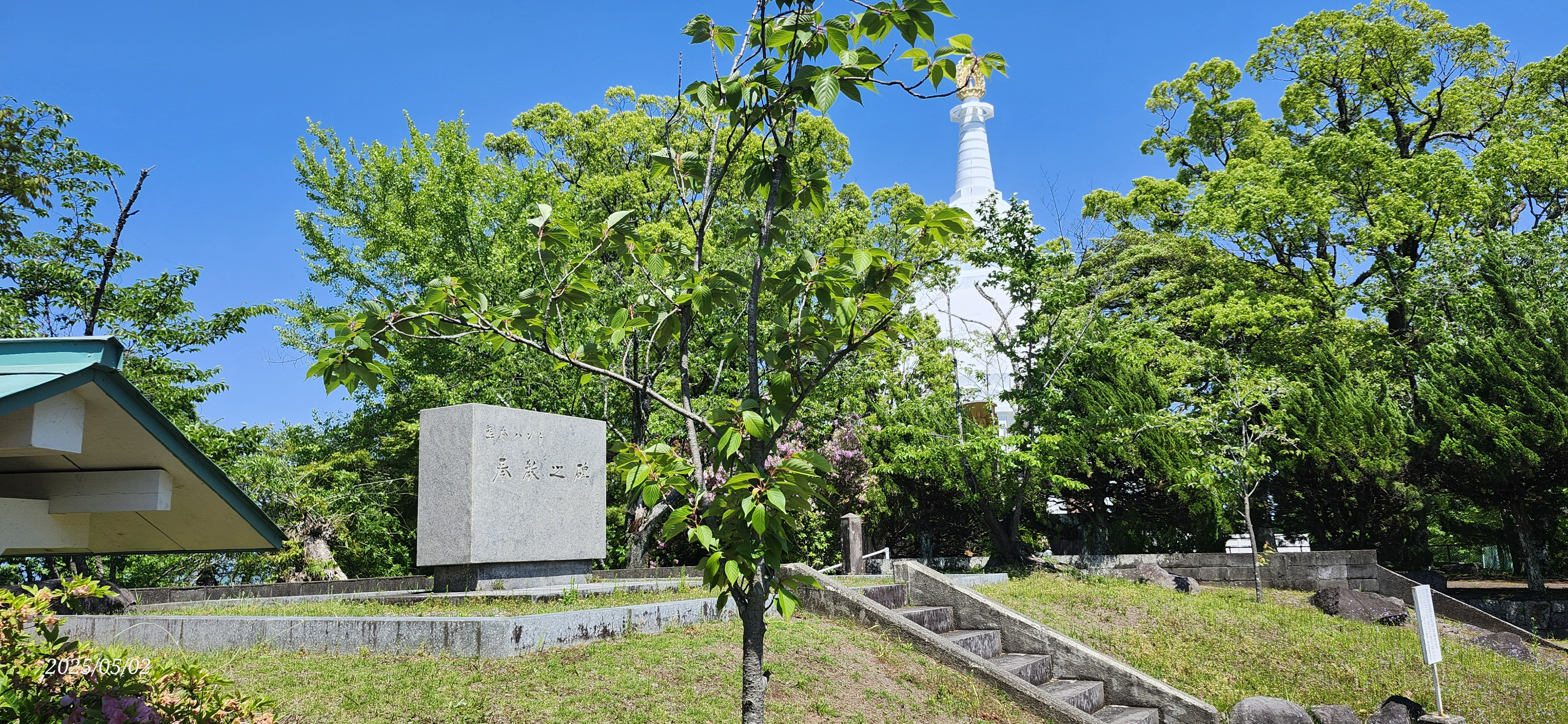
The Kumamoto Band's Monument to Christianity (left)

The Kumamoto Band was a group of Christian men educated at the Kumamoto Yogakko by Leroy Lansing Janes. Alongside the Sapporo Band and the Yokohama Band, the members of the Kumamoto Band became an influential Protestant Christian group in Meiji era Japan.

== History ==
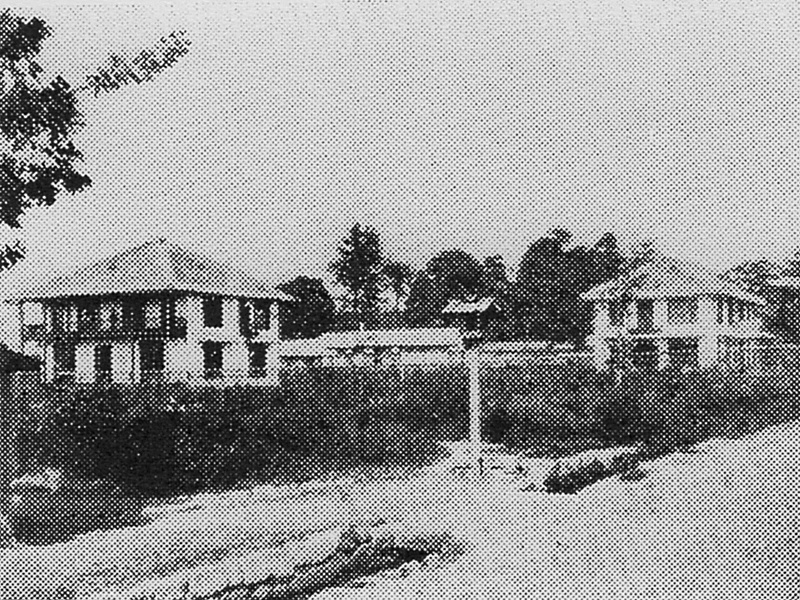
Doshisha Eigakko

The Kumamoto Yogakko, a school of Western studies in Kumamoto, Japan, was founded by Leroy Lansing Janes in 1871. Janes was recommended for the position by Guido Verbeck. Many of the students came from former samurai families, and had entered the school in an attempt to regain their former status that was lost with the abolition of the feudal system in 1868. After the students became proficient in English, Janes began teaching them about Christianity in 1874. He converted 35 students. In January 1876 the students climbed to the top of Mount Hanaoka and signed the Hanaoka Pledge, a confirmation of their faith. The conversion of these students is attributed to the loss of the system of morality that was a part of the feudal system.

In 1877 the school was closed by the Meiji government, and many of the students moved on to Doshisha Eigakko (subsequently Doshisha University), where nine more students were added to the band. Many of the students went on to become missionaries and politicians.

== Notable members ==
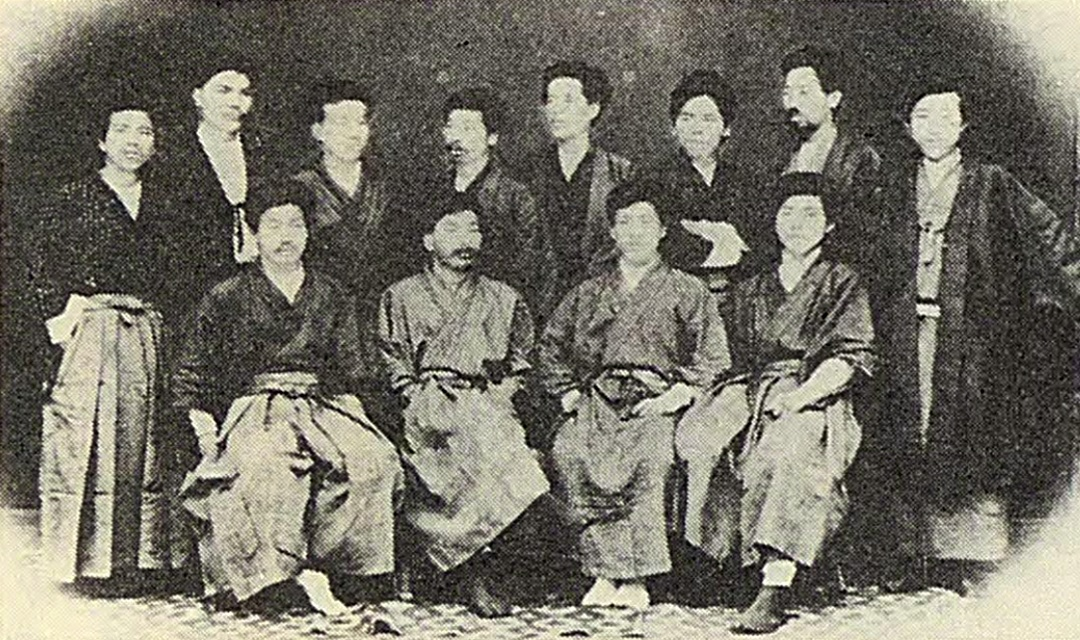
The first alumni of Doshisha Eigakko in 1879

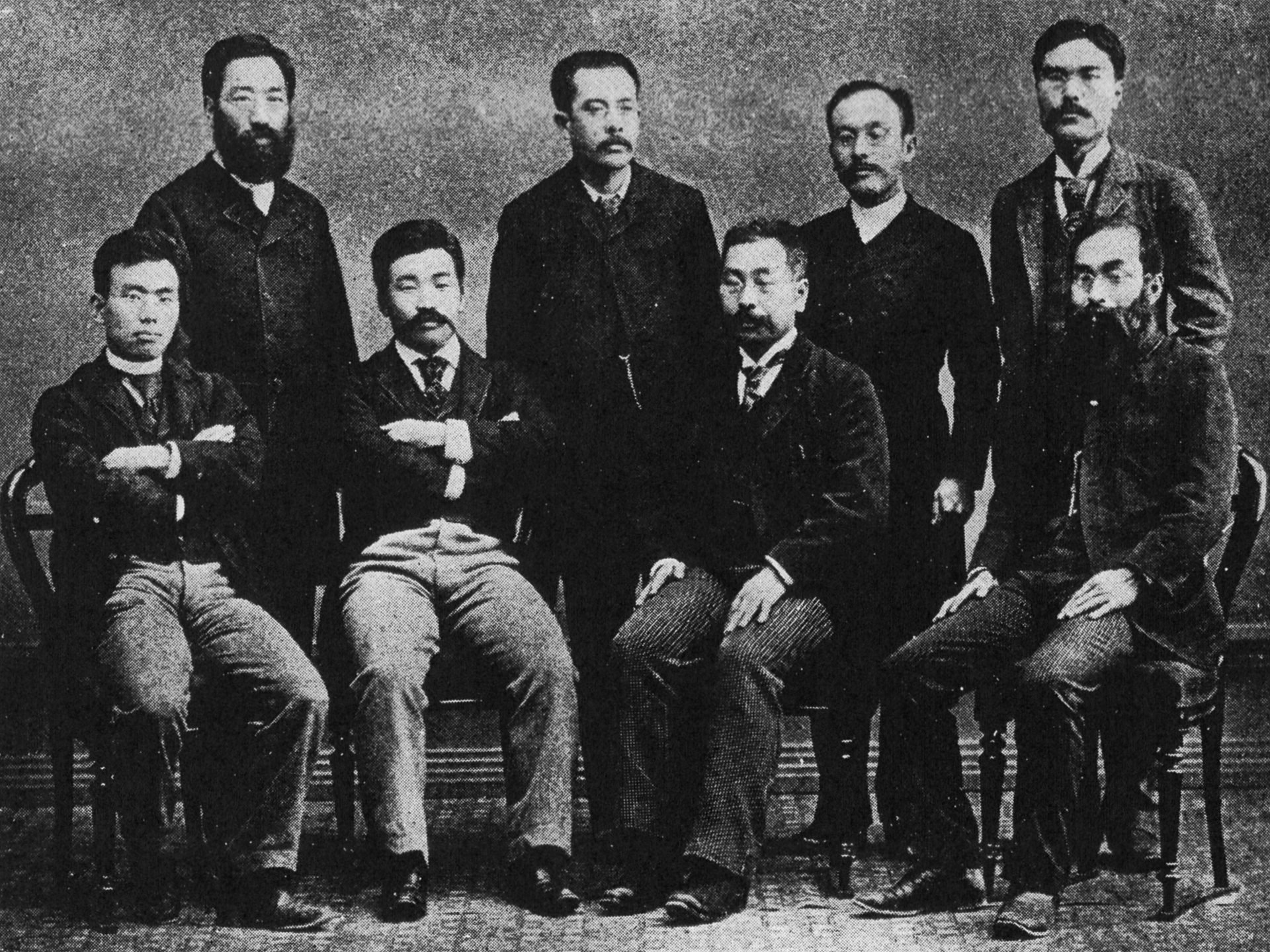
Kumamoto Band pastors in 1892

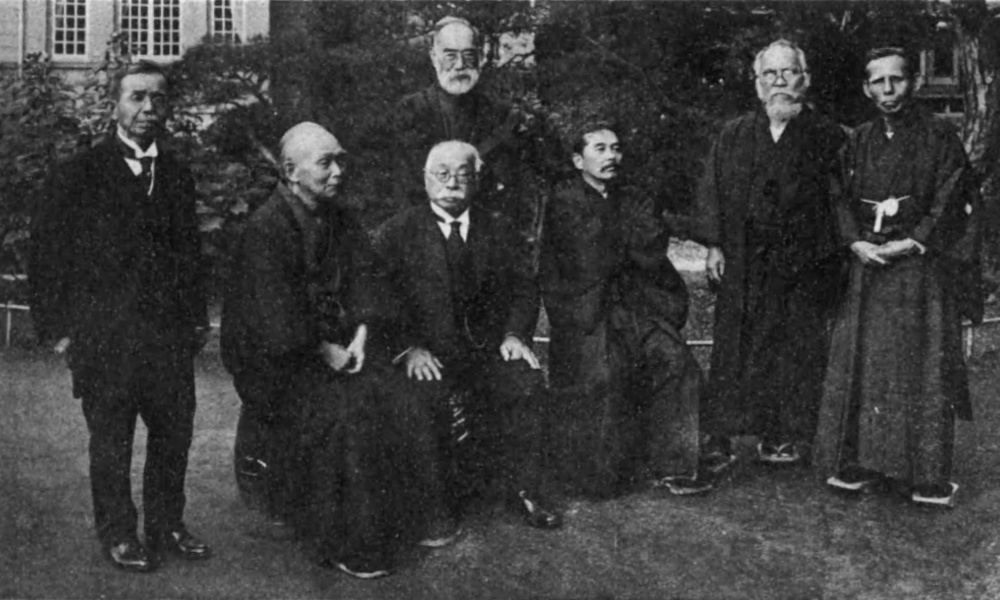
Kumamoto Band pastors in 1930

- Ebina Danjo
- Fuwa Tadajiro
- Harada Tasuku
- Ichihara Morihiro
- Ienaga Toyokichi
- Kameyama Noboru
- Kanamori Michitomo
- Kato Yujiro
- Kozaki Hiromichi
- Kurahara Korehiro
- Matsuo Keigo
- Miyagawa Tsuneteru
- Morita Kumando
- Okada Matsuo
- Osada Tomoyuki
- Shimomura Kotaro
- Tokutomi Sohō
- Uehara Horyu
- Ukita Kazutami
- Yamazaki Tamenori
- Yokoi Tokio
- Yoshida Sakuya
- Yufu Takesaburo

== See also ==
- Joseph Hardy Neesima
- Jerome Dean Davis
- Japanese Congregational Christian Church
- Doshisha University School of Theology
- Liberal Christianity
