= Kumamoto University =

National University in Kunamoto, Japan

Coordinates: 32°48′50″N 130°43′41″E

- 熊本大学
- Type: Public (National)
- Established: Founded 1925, Chartered 1949
- President: Hisao Ogawa
- Academic staff: 1,012
- Administrative staff: 1,544
- Undergraduates: 8,075
- Postgraduates: 2,079
- Location: Kumamoto, Kumamoto Prefecture, Japan
- Campus: Urban, -- acres (2.4 km^{2})
- Colours: Navy and Gold
- Mascot: None
- Website: ewww.kumamoto-u.ac.jp

Kumamoto University (熊本大学, Kumamoto Daigaku), abbreviated to Kumadai (熊大), is a Japanese national university located in Kumamoto, Kumamoto Prefecture in the Kyushu region of Japan. It was established on May 31, 1949, at which time the following institutions were subsumed into it; Kumamoto Teachers College (established in 1874), Kumamoto Pharmaceutical College (1885), the Fifth High School (1887), Kumamoto Medical College (1896), and Kumamoto Technical College (1906).

Currently, the university has seven faculties and eight graduate schools with a total of around 10,000 Japanese students and 500 international students from Asia, North America, South America, Europe, Africa, and Oceania. It is involved in the Top Global University Project, selected by the Japanese Ministry of Education, Culture, Sports, Science and Technology (MEXT), which aims to improve education in Japanese universities in order to increase global recognition and compete with the rest of the world.

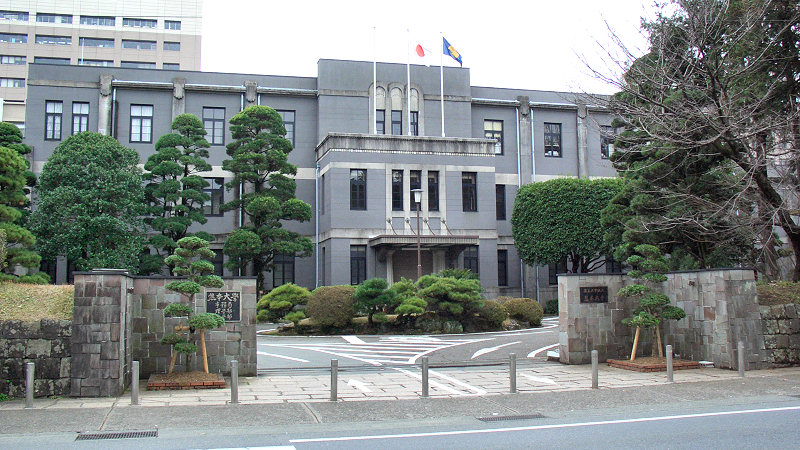
The headquarters office of Kumamoto University

== History ==
The university was chartered by the Showa government on May 31, 1949, under a new Japanese education system reforming older system, merging five institutions of higher education in the city of Kumamoto which includes Kumamoto Teachers College (熊本師範学校 Kumamoto shihan gakkō) established in 1887, Kumamoto Pharmaceutical College (熊本薬学専門学校 Kumamoto yakugaku semmon gakkō) established in 1885, the Fifth High School (第五高等学校 Dai-go kōtō gakkō) established in 1887, Kumamoto Medical College (熊本医科大学 Kumamoto ika daigaku) established in 1896 and Kumamoto Technical College (熊本高等工業学校 Kumamoto kōtō kōgyō gakkō) established in 1897 though the precursor of the university was founded in 1925 as a prefectural university of Kumamoto and subsequently it was reorganized as a national university in 1929.

The hub of the university at the time of foundation was the Fifth High School, which was a center for higher learning in western Japan during the Meiji period and the university began with six departments, with an enrollment of about 1,100 students. In 1955 the Graduate School of Medicine was established at the university and other graduate schools were subsequently founded.

University rankings

Global – Overall
- QS World: 951-1000 (2026)

Regional – Overall
- QS Asia: =254 (2025)

In 2004 Kumamoto University became a National University Corporation under the National University Corporation Law.

Although the university was founded during the Taishō period (1912–1926), it has earlier roots in Saishunkan (再春館) established on September in 1756 as Han school of Kumamoto Domain and Banjien (藩滋園) established on July in 1756 by Shigekata Hosokawa, who was a Japanese samurai daimyō of the Edo period.

== Campuses ==
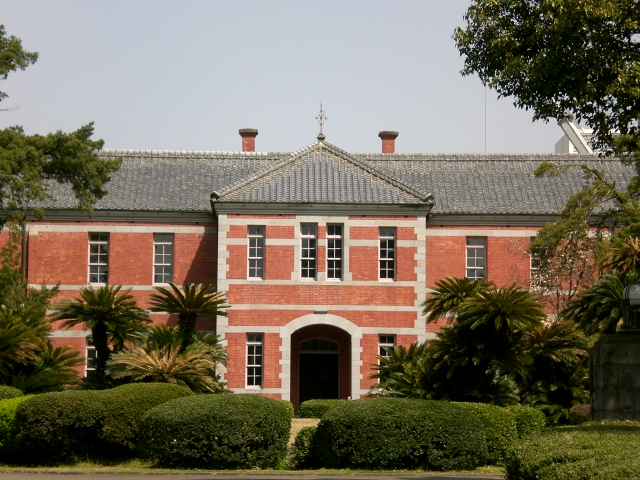
The memorial museum of the Fifth High School in the Kurokami campus

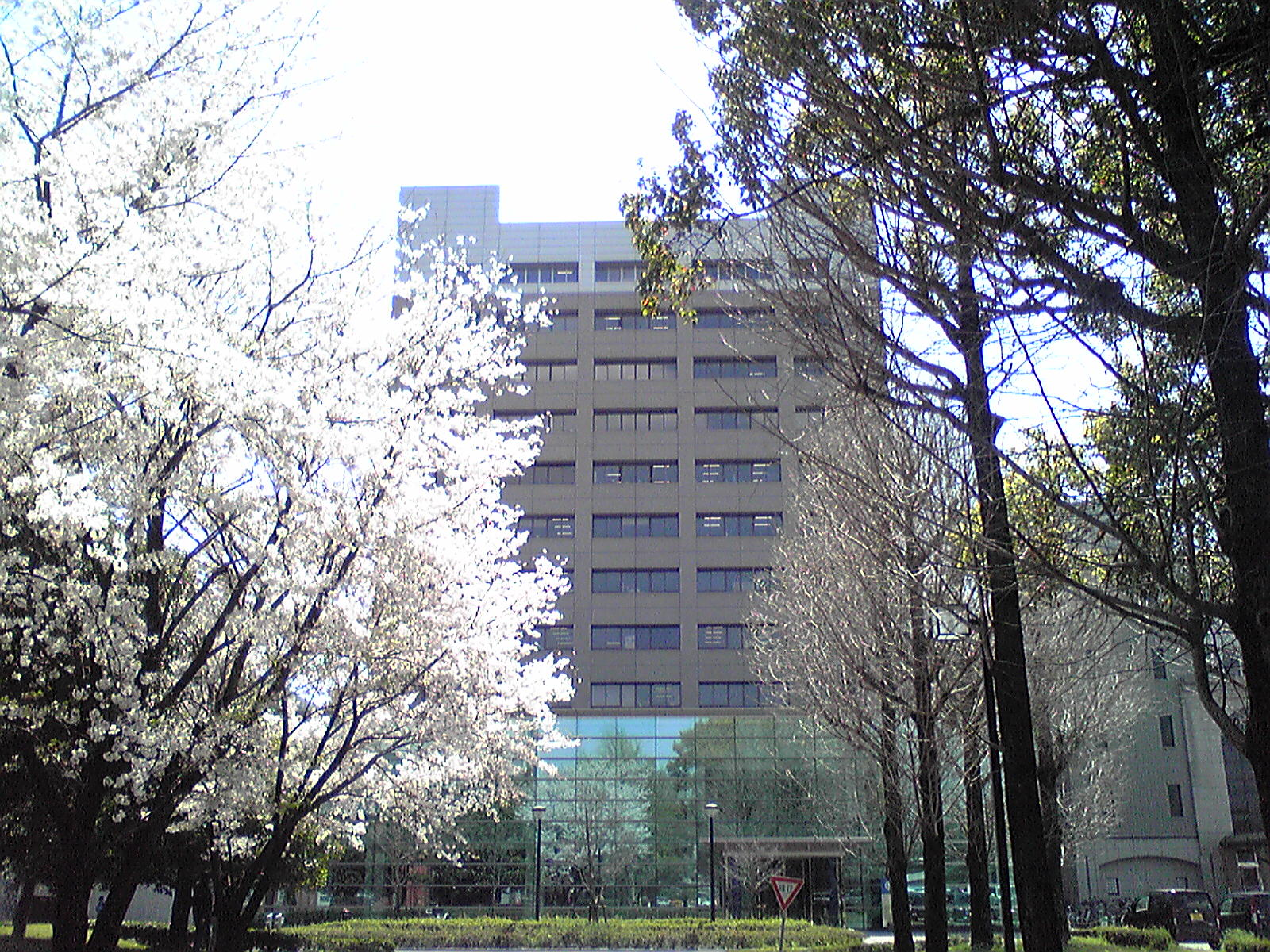
The centenary memorial building in the Kurokami campus

The university has four campuses, two campuses in the Kurokami district, the others in the Honjo-kuhonji district and the Oe district respectively, in the city of Kumamoto.

=== Kurokami North Campus ===
Both of Kurokami North and South Campuses are the main campus, which are located in the Kurokami district of Kumamoto at the foot of Mount Tatsuda.

- Location: 2-40-1, Kurokami, Chuo-ku, Kumamoto
- Departments: Faculty of Letters, Faculty of Education, Faculty of Law
- Graduate schools: Graduate School of Education, Graduate School of Social and Cultural Sciences, School of Law
- Centers and institutes: The Memorial Museum of The Fifth High School, Research Center for Higher Education etc.

=== Kurokami South Campus ===
The headquarters building of the university is located in this campus.

- Location: 2-39-1, Kurokami, Chuo-ku, Kumamoto
- Departments: Faculty of Science, Faculty of Engineering
- Graduate schools: Graduate School of Science and Technology
- Centers and institutes: Institute of Pulsed Power Science, Magnesium Research Center etc.

=== Honjo-kuhonji Campus ===
- Location: 1-1-1, Honjo, Chuo-ku, Kumamoto
- Department: Faculty of Medicine
- Graduate schools: Faculty of Life Sciences, Graduate School of Medical Sciences, Graduate School of Health Sciences
- Centers and institutes: Institute of Molecular Embryology and Genetics, Center for AIDS Research etc.

=== Oe Campus ===
- Location: 5-1, Oehonmachi, Chuo-ku, Kumamoto
- Department: School of Pharmacy
- Graduate schools: Graduate School of Pharmaceutical Sciences, Graduate School of Health Sciences
- Centers and institutes: Institute of Resource Development and Analysis etc.

== Organization ==
The university has about 10,000 students enrolled in its undergraduate and graduate programs. There are seven faculties, eight graduate schools and their affiliated centers and institutes. In addition, the university operates a kindergarten, an elementary school, a junior high school, and a school for disabled children.

=== Faculties ===
- Faculty of Letters
- Faculty of Education
- Faculty of Law
- Faculty of Science
- Faculty of Medicine
- School of Pharmacy
- Faculty of Engineering

=== Graduate schools ===
- Graduate School of Education
- Graduate School of Social and Cultural Sciences
- Graduate School of Science and Technology
- School of Law
- Faculty of Life Sciences
- Graduate School of Medical Sciences
- Graduate School of Pharmaceutical Sciences
- Graduate School of Health Sciences

=== Research Centers ===
- Center for Multimedia and Information Technologies
- Center for Globalization
- Research Center for Higher Education
- Center for Policy Studies
- The Memorial Museum of The Fifth High School
- Institute for e-Learning Development
- Center for Marine Environment Studies
- Magnesium Research Center
- Institute of Resource Development and Analysis
- Center for AIDS Research
- Environmental Safety Center
- Research Center for Buried Cultural Properties
- Institute of Molecular Embryology and Genetics
- Institute of Pulsed Power Science

=== Affiliated Centers, Institutes and Schools ===
- Priority Organization for Innovation and Excellence
- Kumamoto University Innovative Collaboration Organization (KICO)
- Organization for Globalization
- Organization for General Education
- Health Care Center
- Kumamoto University affiliated schools
- Eisei-Bunko Research Center

== Notable people ==
=== Academics ===
- Hiroaki Mitsuya, virologist famous for his role in discovery of the anti-HIV drug zidovudine (AZT)
- Yasuhiro Muramatsu, medical scientist, famous for advocator for the enhanced permeability and retention effect
- Kenichiro Aoki, earth scientist
- Chuhei Takashima, archaeologist
- Masazumi Harada, researcher of Minamata disease
- Takeshi Yamakawa, researcher in the area of fuzzy logic, among other achievements helped Omron to become a leader in this field during the 1980s and 1990s
- Meng Yonggang, Tribologist, Director, State Key Laboratory of Tribology, Tsinghua University

=== Politics ===
- Yasuyuki Eda, politician, House of Representatives member

=== Business ===
- Yukinori Kuwano PhD, engineer, former president of Sanyo Electric Co., Ltd.
- Kazunobu Abe, businessman, CEO of Sakai Chemical Industry Co., Ltd.
- Kazuma Tateishi, founder of OMRON Corporation

=== Art ===
- Takehiko Inoue, manga artist

=== Entertainment ===
- Miyako Miyazaki, model, 4th runner up of Miss Universe 2003
- Keiko Saito, actress
- Yoshiko Miyazaki, actress

=== Literature ===
- Akira Mitsuoka, author, winner of Naoki prize

=== Athletes ===
- Rio Kamikaze, female Kickboxer
- Mr. Gannosuke, professional wrestler
