= Leroy Lansing Janes =

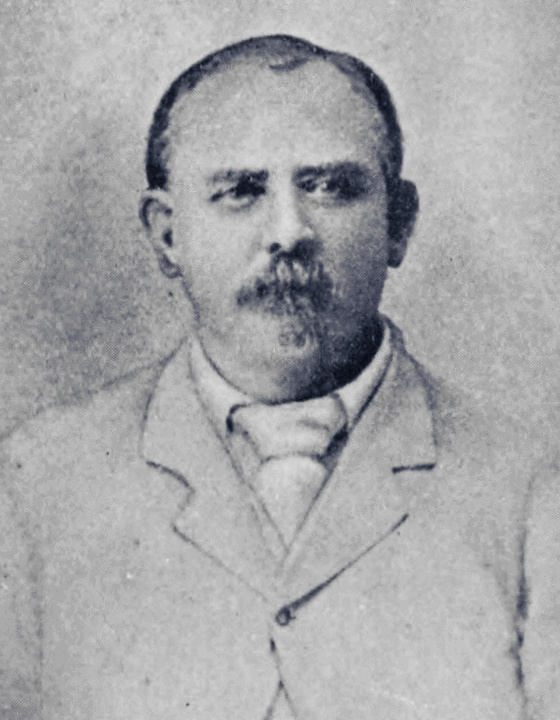
- Leroy Lansing Janes
- Born: 1838; Ohio, United States
- Died: 1909 (aged 70–71)
- Occupations: Educator, missionary
- Children: Elizabeth Dejeans
- Relatives: Henry Martyn Scudder (father-in-law)

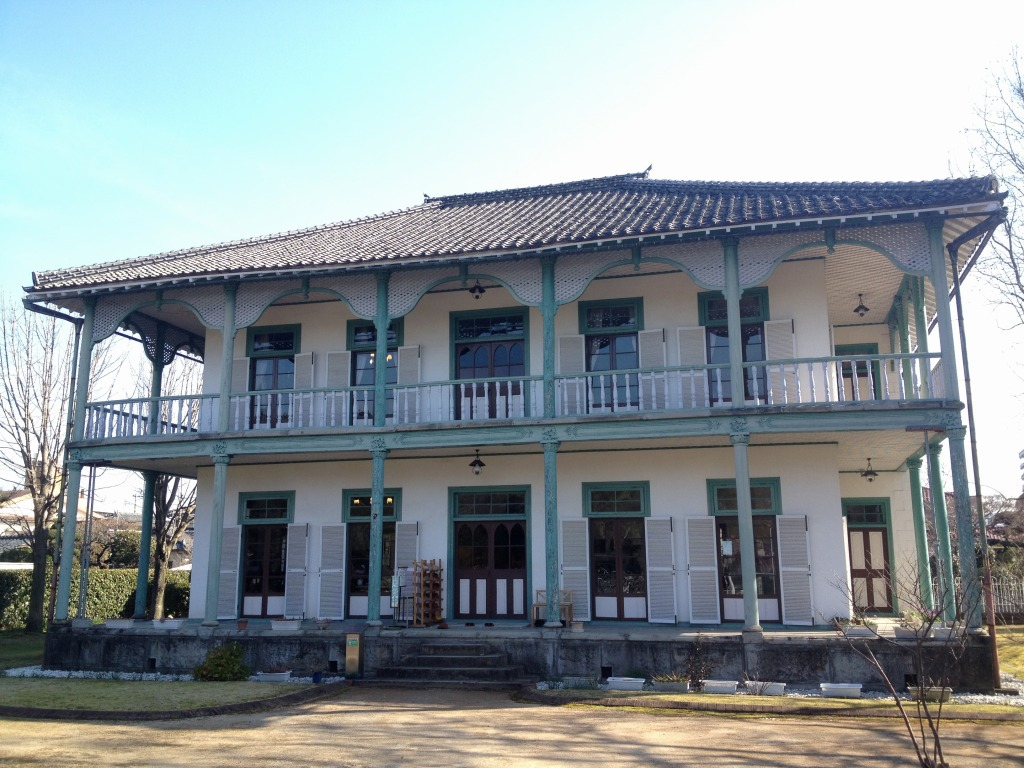
Janes' Mansion (Kumamoto, Japan)

Leroy Lansing Janes (1838–1909) was an American educator, hired by Kumamoto Domain in early Meiji period Japan.

A native of Ohio, Janes was a veteran of the Civil War, where he served in the artillery with the rank of captain after graduation from the United States Military Academy at West Point. In 1871, he was approached by the Hosokawa clan, feudal lords of Kumamoto, to teach at the Kumamoto Yōgakkō, a domainal school that promoted western studies. Janes established a curriculum entirely in English, covering mathematics, history, geography and natural sciences. Janes lectured on western morals, and waited for three years to broach the subject of Christianity with his students, when he felt that he had gained their trust and that their English abilities were sufficient to understand the relationship between Christianity and western civilization.

Some 30 of his pupils converted to Christianity under his influence, including Tokio Yokoi, Kozaki Hiromichi, Ebina Danjo, and Ukita Kazutami. The Kumamoto Yōgakkō was forced to close in August 1876 due to opposition from conservative elements within Kumamoto domain, and Janes, together with his students, relocated to Kyoto, where they joined the Dōshisha school, which had been founded a year earlier by Niijima Jō. Janes returned to the United States in 1878.

Janes returned to Japan to teach again from 1893 to 1899 as an oyatoi gaikokujin.
