= Hosokawa Shigekata =

Japanese samurai daimyō

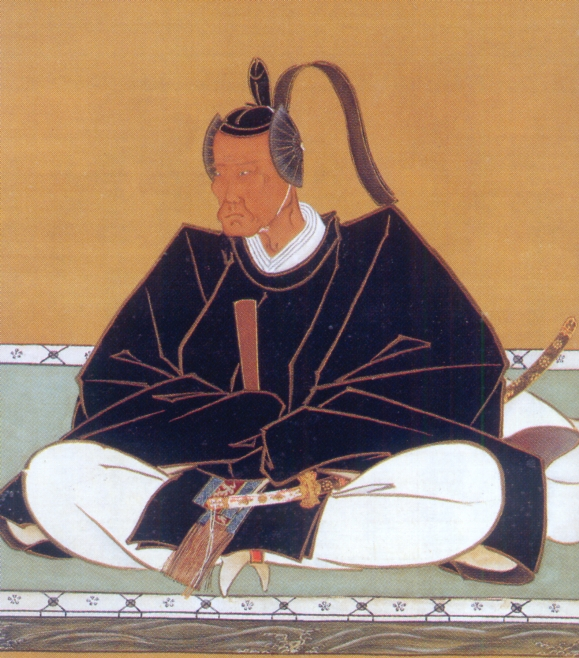
- Hosokawa Shigekata, mid-Edo period daimyō of Kumamoto Domain
- In office 1747–1785
- Preceded by: Hosokawa Munetaka
- Succeeded by: Hosokawa Harutoshi

Personal details
- Born: January 23, 1721 Edo, Japan
- Died: November 27, 1785 Edo, Japan
- Spouse: daughter of Koga Michie

Hosokawa Shigekata (細川 重賢; January 23, 1721 – November 27, 1785) was a Japanese samurai daimyō of the Edo period.

== Early life ==
Shigekata's father, Hosokawa Nobunori, was the 4th daimyō of Hosokawa clan, but his elder brother, the 5th daimyō, unfortunately was killed, because the family crest of another person was similar to that of the Hosokawa clan.

== Family ==
- Father: Hosokawa Nobunori (1676–1732)
- Wife: daughter of Koga Michie
- Concubine: Yokoshi later Entei-in
- Children:
  - Hosokawa Harutoshi (1758–1787) by Yokoshi
  - Norihime later Korin'in married Hosokawa Okinori
  - Hidejiro

== Daimyo ==
Shigekata was the 6th daimyō of Kumamoto of Hosokawa clan, noted for successful financial reform of Kumamoto Domain, for establishing Jishūkan Han school, Medical School Saishunkan and new ideas of criminal law.

There were financial difficulties of the Kumamoto Han. The deficits at the time of his father's administration reached 400,000 Ryō. The financial situation of his Han worsened because of the Edo bakufu's sankin-kōtai policy, and because of famine. Shigekata himself had kept a card of a pawn shop in order not to forget his young hard days, for one reason because he was one of 21 children born to Hosokawa Nobunori.

=== The reform of Horeki ===
In 1752, he appointed Hori Katuna the great Bugyō, often translated as "commissioner", "magistrate" or "governor", was a title assigned to government officers in pre-modern Japan. Hori immediately went to Osaka to negotiate with Kohnoike family and others for loan, but the wealthy families of Osaka refused the requests of Kumamoto han. Then, Hori was successful in borrowing a huge sum of money from Kajimaya in return for 100,000 koku of rice. Kajimaya requested considerable reduced financial interest from Kumamoto han.

Originally, 100 koku for samurai meant 40 koku of rice, or the samurai obtained 40%. After the reform, 20 koku per 100 koku went to a samurai, and then 13 koku, this meant a reduction of 65%. Kokudaka (石高) or the system of koku refers to a system for determining land value for tribute purposes in Edo period Japan and expressing this value in koku of rice. This tribute was no longer a percentage of the actual quantity of rice harvested, but was assessed based on the quality and size of the land. The system was used to value the incomes of daimyō, or samurai under daimyō. Kumamoto han wanted samurai to be satisfied with the Horeki reform, and at the same time, they would train themselves as samurai. One was to build a school of han for samurai and others. Another idea was to rehabilitate those who were against the rules, and Shigekata started completely new criminal laws of the han.

In addition, Shigekata and Hori started the production of washi (Japanese paper), silk, and monopolized production of wax. They at times examined the land and its production (Kenchi, in Japanese). Toward the end of the Hōreki years (1751–1763), the financial status of the Han had greatly improved.

Stockpiled rice and cereal helped the han in the famine of Tenmei.

=== Criticisms of the reform ===
- Because it was so radical, it was not without objections, especially by samurai.
  - In 1772, Matsuno Hichizou, a metsuke, pointed out three bad points of Hori.
  - In 1774, Masuda Yaichiuemon, criticized the Reform in 18 secret letters.
  - Iguchi Souemon, a bugyō favoring the Reform, committed seppuku because he was insulted by Nagaoka Mondo, who was against Hori.
  - Ariyoshi Daizen, a karō, made magic (paranormal) against Shigakata and Hori.
  - Furukawa Koshoken, a travel journalist, visited Kumamoto around the last of Shigekata years; he found a discrepancy between the life of ordinary people and the popularity of Shigekata, and wrote he believed that in Kumamoto, there was nothing good politically.
  - In later years, Yokoi Shōnan criticized the present situation in Kumamoto han, in his Jimu Shian.

== Schools ==
Shigekata established a famous Han school, Jishūkan within the campus of Kumamoto Castle in 1755. This school is known for producing many noted scholars in later years such as Yokoi Shōnan, Inoue Kowashi and Kitasato Shibasaburō. It was open to any class of people, if admission was recognized, not only in Kumamoto people but also in other provinces, with scholarships when students were very bright. There was no such system in other Han schools at this time.

At the most popular period, 255 schools were established in the Edo period in Japan, one in every Han or local country. Other famous schools of Han were Nisshinkan of Aizu, Kōjōkan of Yonezawa, Kohdohkan of Mito, Meirinkan of Chōshū, Shin-yukan of Nakatsu, Kohdohkan of Saga, Zōshikan of Satsuma were known, in addition to Jishūkan.

=== Medical school ===
He established the first public han medical school, Saishunkan (school) in Miyaderamura, Akitagun (now Nihongi), Kumamoto, in 1756 and the school was opened the following year. Its botanical garden was established in Yakuencho, Kumamoto.

== Penal reform ==
Another important reform he made was about the criminal laws. There had been only the death penalty and exile as punishment. Exile was changed to caning and penal labour. Tattooing was changed to shaving the eyebrows, once in 5 days. His idea was to let them work for the Han, and rehabilitate them into society. His reform was made a model in Meiji Restoration. Those who worked were given money in preparation for the days after punishment.

== Additional academic pursuits ==
In his later life, he was interested in biology, the records of plants and animals; which were said to be professional. An interesting animal, possibly drawn by a professional (though he himself drew pictures), was made of the Honshū wolf, which is now extinct. The picture of the wolf is in a book. There were 16 albums of minute pictures of animals and dry plants in the Eisei Bunko, the collection of treasures of the Hosokawa Family.

In his days, daimyō interested in Western matters were rare. He was known as a ran-heki daimyō. Other ran-heki daimyō included Shimazu Shigehide, Satsuma Domain, (1745–1833) and Shimazu Nariakira, Satsuma Domain (1809–1858). These daimyō looked for ways to obtain books or experts on Western learning.

== Ancestry ==
Ancestors of Hosokawa Shigekata

16. Hosokawa Tadatoshi
8. Hosokawa Mitsunao
17. Chiyohime
4. Hosokawa Toshishige
9. Shōkōin
2. Hosokawa Nobunori
1. Hosokawa Shigetaka
3. Iwase Rika

== See also ==
- History of Kumamoto Prefecture § Horeki Reform
