= Tsunenori =

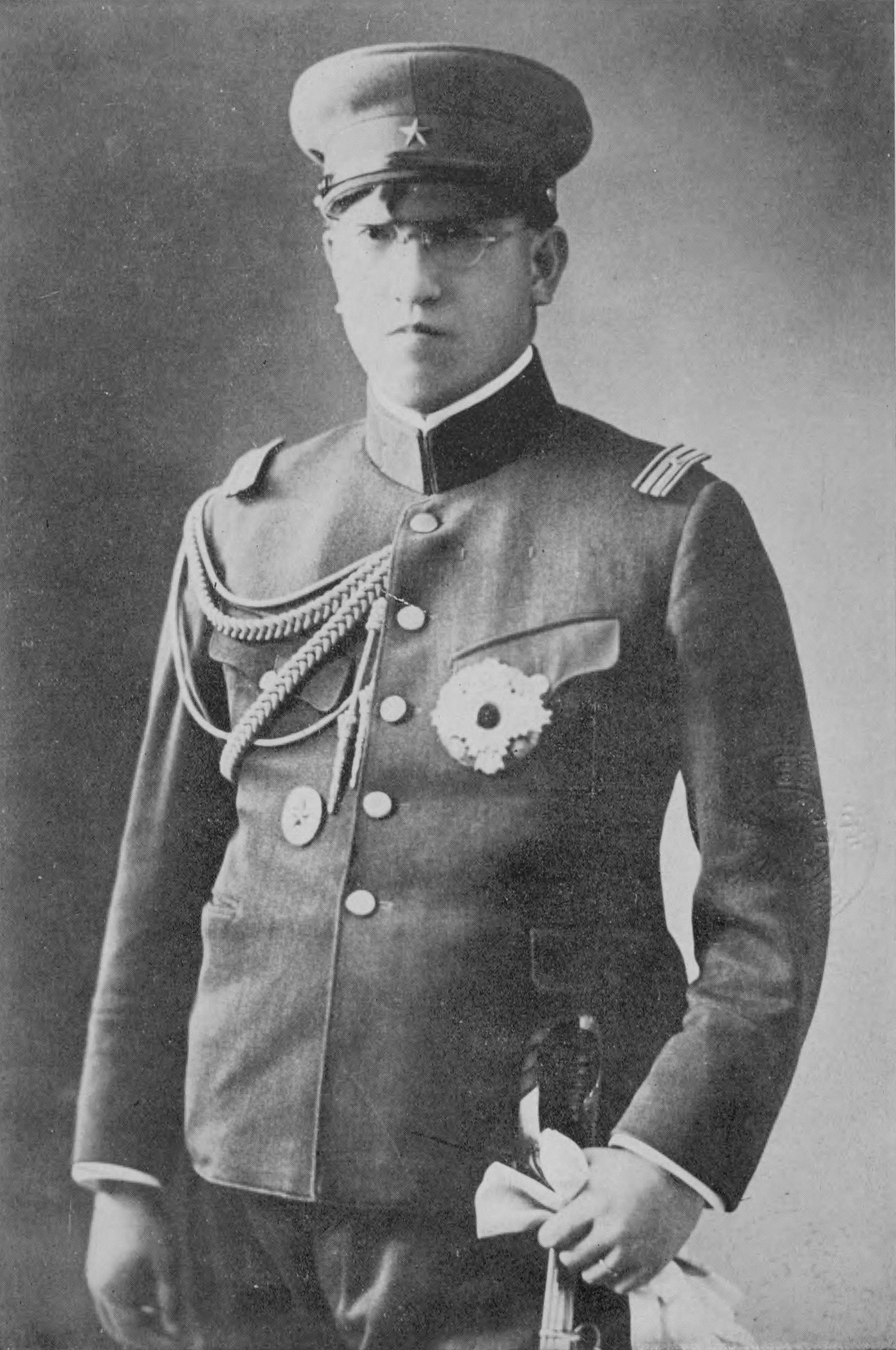
- Prince Tsunenori Kaya (1900–1978), Japanese prince and general.
- Pronunciation: tsɯnenoɾi (IPA)
- Gender: Male

Origin
- Origin: Japanese
- Meaning: Different meanings depending on the kanji used

Other names
- Alternative spelling: Tunenori (Kunrei-shiki) Tunenori (Nihon-shiki) Tsunenori (Hepburn)

Tsunenori is a masculine Japanese given name.

== Written forms ==
Tsunenori can be written using different combinations of kanji characters. Here are some examples:

- 常則, "usual, rule"
- 常紀, "usual, chronicle"
- 常憲, "usual, constitution"
- 常徳, "usual, benevolence"
- 常典, "usual, law code"
- 常法, "usual, method"
- 恒則, "always, rule"
- 恒紀, "always, chronicle"
- 恒憲, "always, constitution"
- 恒徳, "always, benevolence"
- 恒典, "always, law code"
- 恒法, "always, method"
- 庸則, "common, rule"
- 庸紀, "common, chronicle"
- 庸憲, "common, constitution"
- 庸徳, "common, benevolence"
- 毎則, "every, rule"
- 毎紀, "every, chronicle"
- 毎憲, "every, constitution"

The name can also be written in hiragana つねのり or katakana ツネノリ.

== Notable people with the name ==
- Tsunenori Aoki (青木 玄徳; born 1987), Japanese actor and model.
- Tsunenori Kawai (河合 常則; born 1937), Japanese politician.
- Prince Tsunenori Kaya (賀陽宮恒憲王, Kaya no miya Tsunenori ō; 1900–1978), Japanese prince and general.
- Tsunenori Kujo (九条 経教; 1331–1400), Japanese kugyō.
- Tsunenori Shimizu (清水 規矩; 1897–1968), Japanese general.
- Tsunenori Tokuhisa (徳久 恒範; 1844–1910), Japanese politician.
