= Elizabeth Dejeans =

American writer

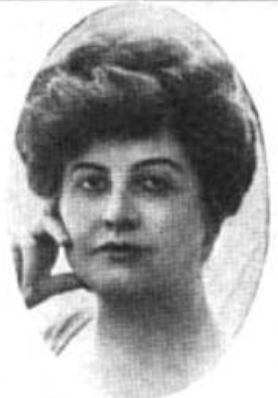
- Elizabeth Dejeans, from a 1917 publication
- Born: Frances Elizabeth Janes; December 27, 1868; New Philadelphia, Ohio
- Died: February 6, 1928 (aged 59); Dover, Ohio
- Other names: Elizabeth Janes, Elizabeth Budgett
- Occupation: Novelist
- Father: Leroy Lansing Janes
- Relatives: Henry Martyn Scudder (grandfather)

Frances Elizabeth Janes Budgett (December 27, 1868 – February 6, 1928), writing under the pen name Elizabeth Dejeans, was an American novelist. Three silent films were based on works by Dejeans.

== Early life ==
Frances Elizabeth Janes was born in New Philadelphia, Ohio, the daughter of Leroy Lansing Janes and Harriet Waterbury Scudder Janes. Her mother was born in India; her maternal grandfather was Presbyterian missionary Henry Martyn Scudder. She spent part of her childhood in Japan, when her father, an American Civil War veteran, was working as a teacher in Kumamoto. She attended the University of Michigan, but left to marry.

== Career ==
Dejeans wrote novels and short stories, mostly "popular female romances" focused on the New Woman and her modern problems. "Dejeans writes neither trash nor sensationalism," explained a 1912 reviewer, "but she does draw powerful pictures of the things that are not always pleasant to look upon." She was public in her support of women's suffrage. Two of her novels and one story were adapted for the screen: The Tiger's Coat (1920), Crashin' Thru (1923), and The Romance of a Million Dollars (1926).

== Publications ==
- The Winning Chance (1909, novel)
- The Heart of Desire (1910, novel)
- "A Blotted Page" (1910, short story)
- The Far Triumph (1911, novel)
- The House of Thane (1913, novel)
- The Life-Builders (1915, novel)
- The Tiger's Coat (1917, novel)
- "The Ten Virgins" (1917, short story)
- Nobody's Child (1918, novel)
- "Twixt the Cup and Lip" (1920, short story)
- The Moreton Mystery (1922, novel)
- The Romance of a Million Dollars (1922, novel)
- "If a Woman Will" (1923, short story)
- The Slayer of Souls (1923, serialized novel)
- The Double House (1924, novel)
- The Winning Game (1925, novel)
- The Mansions of Unrest (1926, novel)

== Personal life ==
In 1894, Elizabeth Janes married English physician and medical school professor Sidney Paine Budgett. She died by suicide in 1928, at the age of 59, in Dover, Ohio.
