= Kujō Hisatsune =

Kujō Hisatsune (九条 尚経; January 7, 1469 – August 1, 1530), son of regent Masamoto, was a kugyō or Japanese court noble of the Muromachi period (1336–1573). He held a regent position kampaku from 1501 to 1513. Tanemichi was his son.

== Family ==
- Father: Kujō Masamoto
- Mother: Jusanmi Tomoko
- Wife: Sanjōnishi Yasuko
- Children (all by Sanjōnishi Yasuko):
  - Kujō Tanemichi
  - Kazanin Iesuke (1519–1580)
  - son (尋円)
  - Tsuneko married Nijō Korefusa
  - Ooka Zenkichi
