= Kujō Tadamoto =

Kujō Tadamoto (九条 忠基; 1345 – 1397), son of regent Tsunenori with Sanjo Sanetada’s daughter, was a kugyō or Japanese court noble of the Muromachi period (1336–1573). He held regent positions kampaku from 1375 to 1379. He adopted his biological brother Mitsuie as his son.

== Bibliography ==
- ネケト. 九条家（摂家） (in Japanese). Archived from the original on 2007-09-27.
