= Kujō Mitsuie =

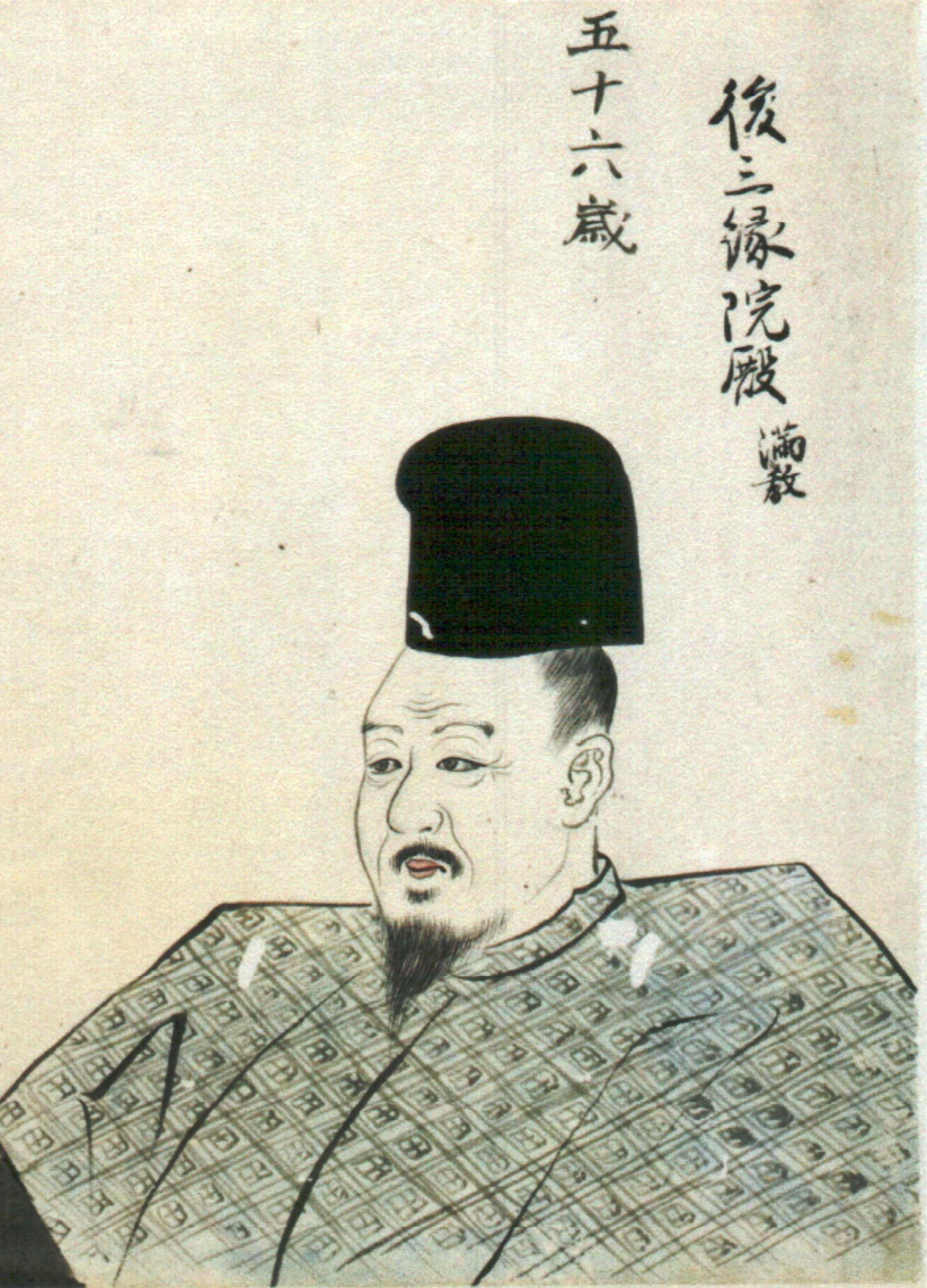

Kujō Mitsuie (九条 満家; 1394 – 1449), son of regent Tsunenori and adopted son of Kujō Tadamoto, was a kugyō or Japanese court noble of the Muromachi period (1336–1573). He held a regent position kampaku from 1418-1424. Masatada and Masamoto were his sons.

== Family ==
- Father: Kujō Tsunenori
- Foster Father: Kujō Tadamoto
- Wife: Karahashi Aritoyo’s daughter
- Children:
  - Kujō Masatada
  - Kujō Masamoto
