= Saishunkan (school) =

Saishunkan (Kumamoto)
- Nihongi, Kumamoto Kumamoto Prefecture; Japan

Information
- Type: Medical school run by Kumamoto Han
- Established: 1757
- Closed: 1870
- President: Murai Kenboku(first)
- Enrollment: 400(at best)
- Information: Internal medicine (Chinese medicine), surgery, ophthalmology, pediatrics, gynecology, oral medicine, acupuncture, acupressure were taught. In addition, anatomy and pharmacology were taught. Later, western medicine was taught.

Saishunkan was a han medical school, established by Hosokawa Shigekata in 1756 in Kumamoto, Japan. Internal medicine (Chinese medicine), surgery (treatment of wounds), ophthalmology, pediatrics, gynecology, oral medicine, acupuncture, acupressure were taught.

== History ==
- Murai Kenboku, who already had a private school and a reputation and treated Hosokawa Shigekata was ordered to build a school in 1756 at Kumamoto and the school was started in January 1757 at Nihongi. A botanical garden was started in 1756. The school was moved to Yamasaki (now Kon-ya imamachi) in 1771 and was discontinued in 1870 at Meiji restoration. Furushiro Medical School was started in Kumamoto Castle in the same year. These were the forerunners of the Faculty of Medicine, Kumamoto University.

== Principles of Saishunkan ==
=== Wall Motto by Nagaoka Naizen ===
- Medicine was started by Ki-oh(岐黄) who wrote a medical book and medicine is based on virtue or saving life, the central dogma of Japanese medicine. You must not select your patients by his rank, you must disregard the highness of fees. You must do your duties. Treatment should be based on science. Otherwise, do not rely on your transient luck. Respect your teachers.

=== Saishunkan Kaiyaku by Murai Kenboku ===
- You must know. The government begins a medical school and stores a number of books, hires professors and teaches students various lessons; in order to minimize death in early years and death by infectious diseases. This is great grace. You must get up early, study till midnight, study hard and broadly, you accomplish your duties, you must broaden your virtue. Do your best. Do not be lazy.

== Students ==
- The first students numbered 239. They numbered 269 if official doctors and aged doctors were included.

== Administration ==
- Under the school bugyo, there were people,a school surveillance man, a doctor surveillance man, professors, surgeons and others.
  - Bugyo (奉行), often translated as "commissioner" or "magistrate" or "governor," was a title assigned to government officers in pre-modern Japan; other terms would be added to the title to describe more specifically a given commissioner's tasks or jurisdiction.

== Subjects and textbooks ==
- Internal medicine (Chinese medicine), surgery, ophthalmology, pediatrics, gynecology, oral medicine, acupuncture, acupressure were taught. In addition, anatomy and pharmacology were taught.
- Textbooks named 内経 was medicine in general.脈経 was diagonostics.病源候論 was symptomatology, 傷寒論 was a textbook of internal medicine. 甲乙経 meant acupuncture and acupressure. 本草綱目 was Chinese medicine vegetables and their use. Medicine changes according to age, and the notebooks of lectures were also made textbooks.

== Examinations ==
- Examinations were performed, including surgery. Grading of doctors was made such as great doctor, good doctor, etc. In later years, western medicine was taught, and translation of Japanese to western language was tested.

== Other medical schools ==
- There were other private medical schools in Kumamoto.

== See also ==
- History of Kumamoto Prefecture
