= Kujō Masamoto =

Kujō Masamoto (九条 政基; 1445–1516), son of regent Mitsuie, was a kugyō or Japanese court noble of the Muromachi period (1336–1573). He held a regent position kampaku from 1476 to 1479. Kujō Hisatsune was his son.

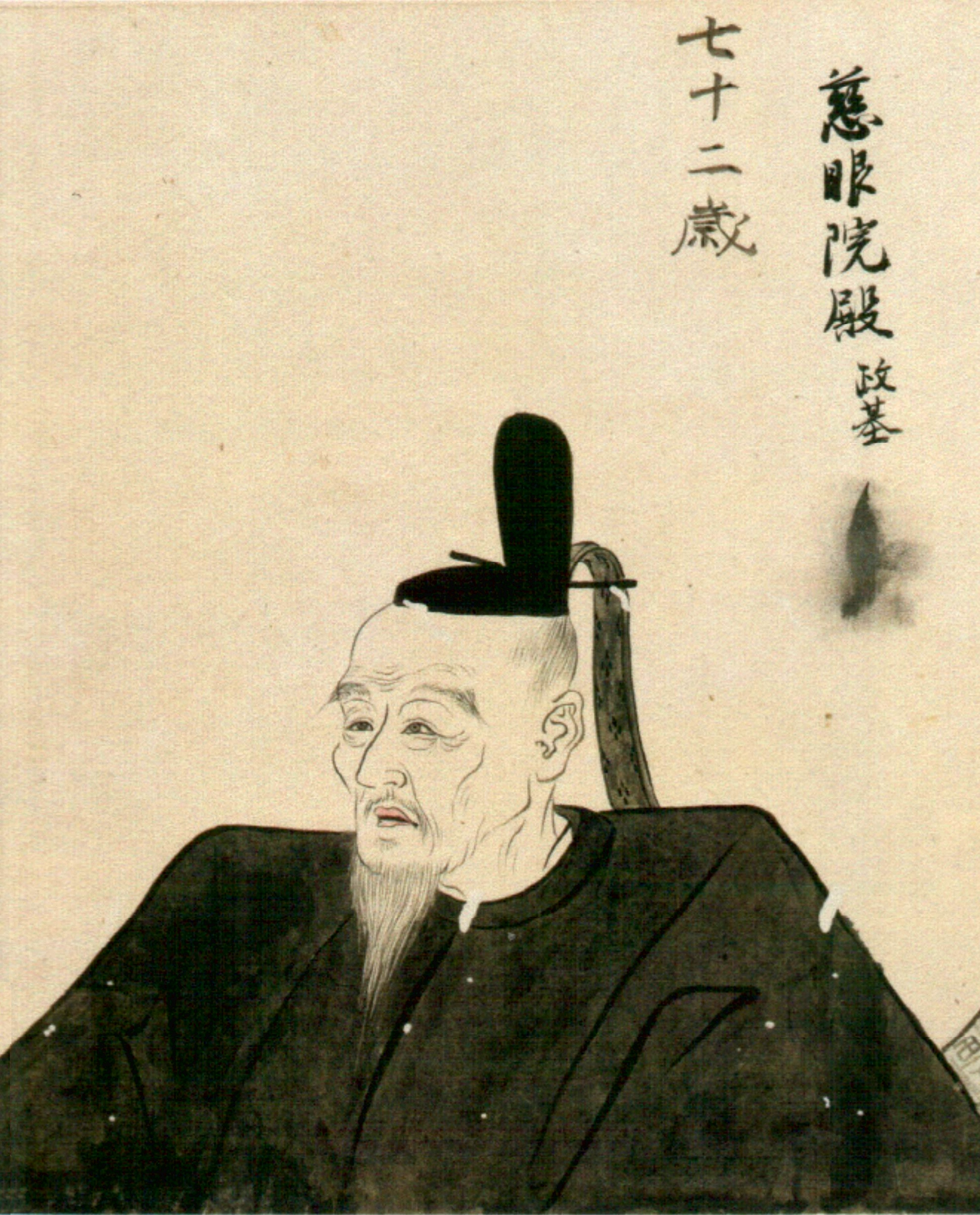

== Masamoto-kō Tabihikitsuke ==
In 1501, Kujō Masamoto left Kyoto for an extended stay at the family's Hine Estate to manage the shōen directly in a time when courtier control of estates was increasingly disrupted by the military conflicts and social transformations of the Sengoku period. Masamoto kept a diary, Tabihikitsuke (published as Masamoto-kō Tabihikitsuke 政基公旅引付), which offers a view of estate management and rural life and livelihoods.

== Family ==
- Father: Kujō Mitsuie
- Mother: Karahashi Aritoyo's daughter
- Wives and Children:
  - Wife: Jusanmi Tomoko
    - Kujō Hisatsune
  - Wife: Mushanakoji Takamitsu's daughter
    - Hosokawa Sumiyuki (1489–1507)
  - unknown
    - Jijiyuin
    - son (1505–1564) adopted by Ashikaga Yoshitane
    - son (?-1582)
    - 3 sons
