= Tokio Yokoi =

Japanese Christian missionary and politician

- 横井 時雄
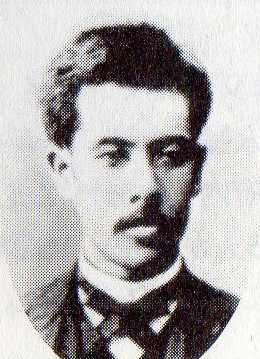

Member of the House of Representatives
- In office 1 March 1904 – 6 May 1909
- Preceded by: Multi-member district
- Succeeded by: Kawashima Kameo
- Constituency: Okayama Counties

Personal details
- Born: 3 December 1857 Kamimashiki, Higo, Japan
- Died: 13 September 1927 (aged 69) Beppu, Ōita, Japan
- Resting place: Nanzenji temple 南 禅 寺 の 古 刹 in the ‘Natural Gift hermitage 授 庵 section
- Party: Rikken Seiyukai
- Education: Doshisha University
- Occupation: Pastor, journalist, politician; Christian Minister, member of the Kumam
- Nickname: Tokio Ise

Tokio Yokoi (横井 時雄) (December 3, 1857 – September 13, 1927) was a Japanese pastor, journalist, bureaucrat, and member of the Japanese House of Representatives. He was also known as Tokio Ise(伊勢 時雄).

== Career ==
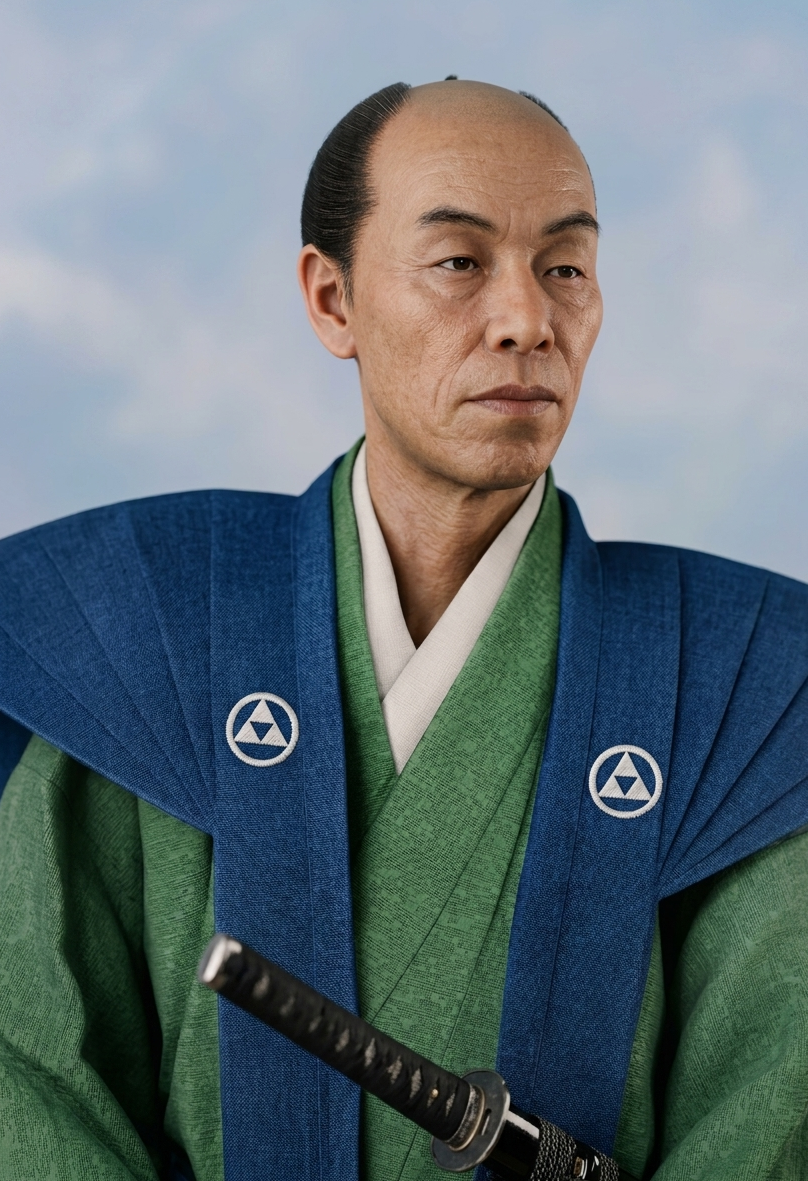
Father of Rev Tokio Yokoi

Yokoi was born on December 3, 1857, in Higo Province, which is now Kumamoto prefecture. He was the first son of Yokoi Shonan, a scholar and political reformer during the end of the Bakufu era. He was also related to Kanamori Michitomo, Tokutomi Soho, and Tokutomi Roka on his mother's side.

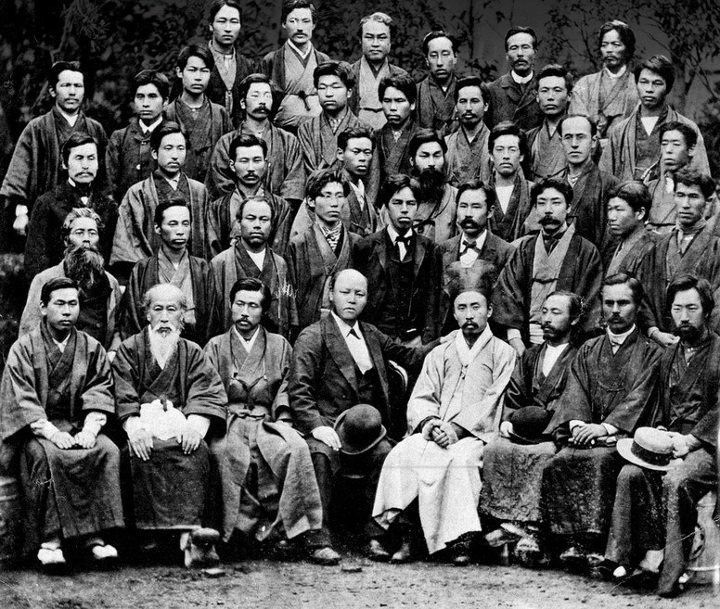
In this photo of the 1883 All-Japan Christian Conference, Yokoi is in the third row, third from the left.

Yokoi studied at the Kumamoto Yogakko and was part of the Kumamoto Band while studying there. In 1876, he moved to Tokyo and entered the Kaisei Gakko, but quickly transferred to Doshisha University. Yokoi graduated in 1879, was baptized by Rev, George Cochran, and before he became a missionary in Imabari, Ehime. Yokoi's conversion to Christianity was not taken well by his family; his mother threatened to commit suicide from shame.

In 1883 he returned to Kyoto to lead the 3rd All-Japan Christian Conference with Miyagawa Tsuneteru and Ebina Danjo, and others from the Kumamoto Band.

In 1886, Yokoi resigned from his position as pastor at the Imabari church. After teaching at Doshisha University, he took over the Hongo Congregational Church in Tokyo from Ebina Danjo. He also edited the Kirisuto-kyo Shinbun and the Rikugo Zasshi, supporting Uchimura Kanzo. During this period he became an admirer of Liberal Christianity, and wrote a book about it in 1894. It was called Waga kuni no Kirisuto-kyo Mondai (我邦の基督教問題).

In 1897, Yokoi started the Hinototori Konwakai (丁酉懇話会), and in the same year became president of the Doshisha School. He resigned in 1899 and worked in the Ministry of Communications until 1903, when he was elected to the House of Representatives, representing Okayama Prefecture. He was a member of the Rikken Seiyukai political party. In 1909 Yokoi was interned because of his involvement with a corruption scandal. He resigned on May 6, 1909. He was imprisoned in Tokyo for five months and was fined 2,500 yen.

After his release, Yokoi became the managing editor of the Tokyo Nichi Nichi Shinbun and published a magazine called "Jidai Shicho". He also attended the Paris Peace Conference in 1919.

Yokoi died on September 13, 1927, in Beppu, Japan.
