= Kujō Tsunenori =

Kujō Tsunenori (九条 経教; 1331 – 1400), son of Nijō Michihira and adopted son of regent Michinori, was a kugyō or Japanese court noble of the Muromachi period (1336–1573). He held a regent position kampaku from 1358 to 1361.

== Family ==
- Father: Nijō Michihira
- Foster Father: Kujō Michinori
- Foster Mother: Oomiya Suehira’s daughter
- Wives and children:
  - Wife: Sanjo Sanetada’s daughter
    - Kujō Tadamoto
  - Wife: Reizei Sadachika’s daughter
    - Kujo Noritsugu (1362-1404)
  - Wife: Shakunyo‘s daughter
    - Kyōkaku (1395-1473)
  - unknown:
    - Kujō Mitsuie
    - Dōson
    - Koen (1378-1410)
    - Jinku (?-1415)
