= Kujō Masatada =

Kujō Masatada (九条 政忠; 1439–1488), son of regent Mitsuie, was a kugyō or Japanese court noble of the Muromachi period (1336–1573). He held a regent position kampaku from 1487 to 1488.

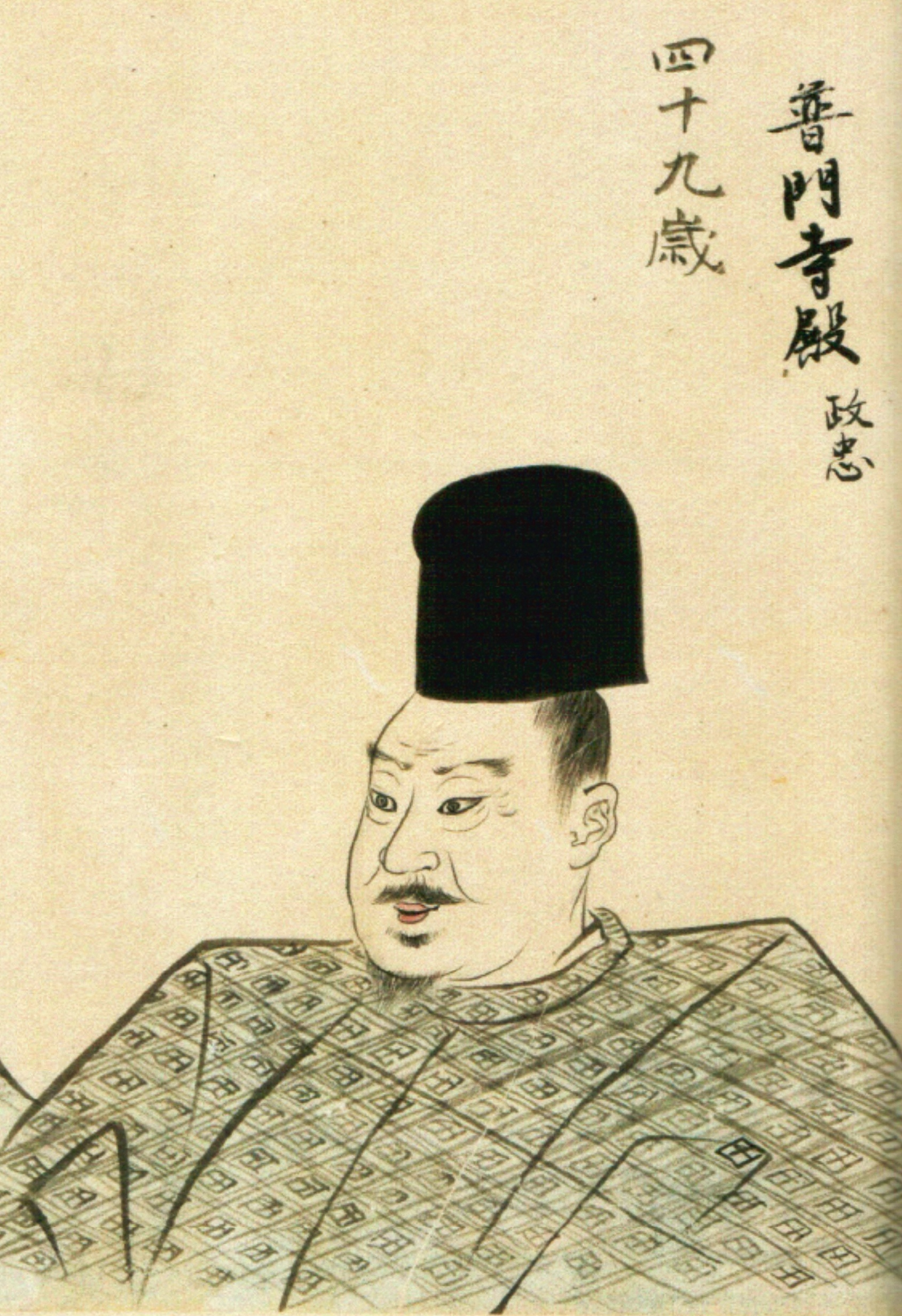
