= Kanamori Michitomo =

Japanese Christian minister

- 金森通倫
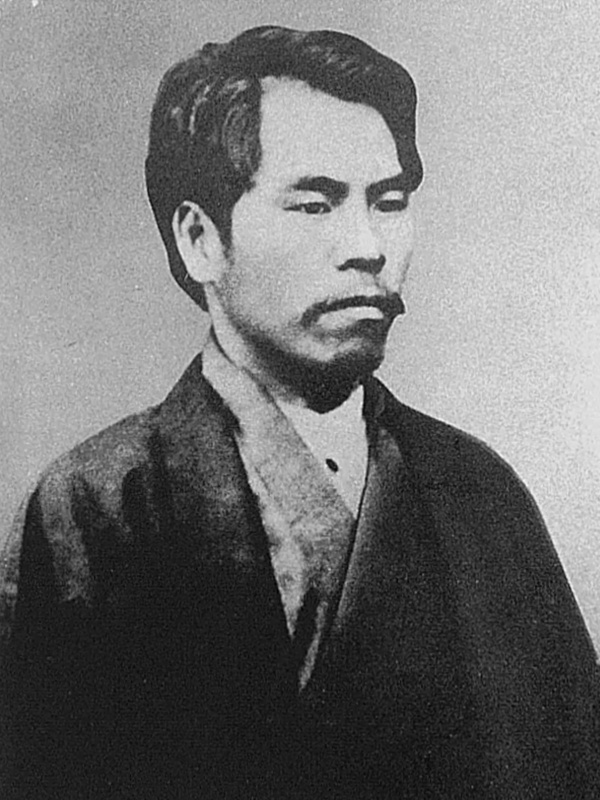
- Kanamori Michitomo
- Born: 2 October 1857; Higo province
- Died: 4 March 1945 (aged 87); Kōriyama
- Resting place: Tama Cemetery, Tokyo
- Other names: Paul Kanamori
- Education: Kumamoto Yogakko, Doshisha University
- Occupation: Christian minister

Kanamori Michitomo (金森 通倫; 2 October 1857 – 4 March 1945) was a Japanese Christian minister. He also went under the English name Paul Kanamori and published as Kanamori Tsurin.

Former prime minister of Japan, Shigeru Ishiba is Kanamori's great-grandson.

== Early life and education ==
Kanamori was born in Higo province, Japan, in what is now Tamana, Kumamoto prefecture on October 2, 1857. He was born into a samurai family. He attended the Kumamoto Yogakko, where he was a member of the Kumamoto Band. He converted to Christianity in 1875. He continued his education at Doshisha University and graduated in 1879.

He had several children, including Taro Kanamori and Jiro Kanamori.

== Career ==
After graduation Kanamori became a missionary in Okayama prefecture. His work was sponsored by the American Board of Commissioners for Foreign Missions. He then moved to Tokyo and served as a pastor for a large congregation there. He was later invited to teach theology at Doshisha University by Joseph Hardy Neeshima. During this period he also wrote and translated several books, such as his 1891 The Present and Future of Christianity in Japan.

Kanamori renounced his Christian faith in the 1890s because he and other pastors interpreted Christian doctrine differently. During this period he worked in the Interior Ministry and in business. He returned to the church after the death of his wife in 1914. From 1915 onward he travelled all over Japan giving sermons for thousands of people. He later also travelled to Taiwan, China, Korea, Hawaii, and the United States to give sermons to the Japanese-speaking populations there. He became well known for his "Three-hour sermon" and for evangelizing. He later joined the Holiness Movement in 1927, but left in 1933.

Kanamori died in Kōriyama, Japan on March 4, 1945. He is buried at Tama Cemetery in Tokyo.
