= Jishūkan =

Jishūkan (Kumamoto)
- Kumamoto Castle, Kumamoto Prefecture; Japan

Information
- Type: Run by Kumamoto Han school
- Established: 1755
- Closed: 1870
- President: Akiyama Gyokuzan(first)
- Campus size: 45 meters by 135 meters
- Information: Subjects: Four Books and Five Classics from China, Han learning, East Asian calligraphy, preparation for ceremonies, mathematics, music, the study of Precedent. Bodily Exercises:Equestrianism, Battojutsu, Naginatajutsu, Sojutsu, Hojutsu

Jishūkan was the Han school of Kumamoto, Japan existing between 1755 and 1870. It was established by Hosokawa Shigekata, the 6th Hosokawa clan daimyō of Higo Province, Kumamoto, Kumamoto, inside Kumamoto Castle and this school is known for producing many noted scholars such as Yokoi Shounan, Inoue Kowashi and Kitasato Shibasaburo.

== Other Jishūkans ==
- There have been other Jishūkans. They include Jishūkans of Mikawa Yoshida Han, Ohtahara Han, Kasama Han, Daiseiji Han and Sakurai Han.

== Origin of the name ==
- It came from the Analects of Confucius, that study and at times learn. The same name is given to many other schools of Han of Han system.

== Origin of the school ==
- After the successful financial reform of Kumamoto Han, Hosokawa Shigekata started a unique school in the Edo era; it was open to any class of people, if admission was recognized, not only in Kumamoto people but also in other countries, with scholarships. There was no such system in other Han schools at this time.

== Other schools ==
- At the most popular period, 255 schools were established in the Edo era, almost in every Han or local country. Other famous schools of Han were Nisshinkan of Aizu, Kohjohkan of Yonezawa, Kohdohkan of Mito, Meirinkan of Choshu, Shin-yukan of Nakatsu, Kohdohkan of Saga, Zohshikan of Satsuma were known, in addition to Jishuukan.
  - A neo-Confusionist from Satsuma domain was asked to build a school and asked the Jishuukan to observe the lessons. He was shown archery, equestrianism, fencing, Sojutsu, and then interpretation and poems and literature, in the order of importance.

== Location of Jishuukan and Subjects ==
- Jishūkan was conveniently located at Ninomaru, 25 ken (45 meters) from east to west and 75 ken (135 meters) from south to north, with an eastern gate and western gate. Rooms for study were in the northern part, while in the southern part, defense arts were exercised.
- Learning at the Jishūkan was basically following Neo-Confucian in China, Zhū Xī or Chu Hsi (朱熹, October 18, 1130, Youxi, Fujian province, China – April 23, 1200, China).
- Subjects in the rooms were: Four Books and Five Classics from China, Han learning, East Asian calligraphy, preparation for ceremonies, mathematics, music, the study of Precedent.
- Bodily Exercises are also needed:Equestrianism, Battojutsu, Naginatajutsu, Sojutsu, Hojutsu

== Teachers ==
- The first president was Akiyama Gyokuzan.
- Hayashi Ōen taught here from 1868 until his death.

== End of the school ==
- It was discontinued at the Meiji restoration.

== See also ==
- History of Kumamoto Prefecture
