= Han school =

Schools established by feudal domains in Edo period Japan

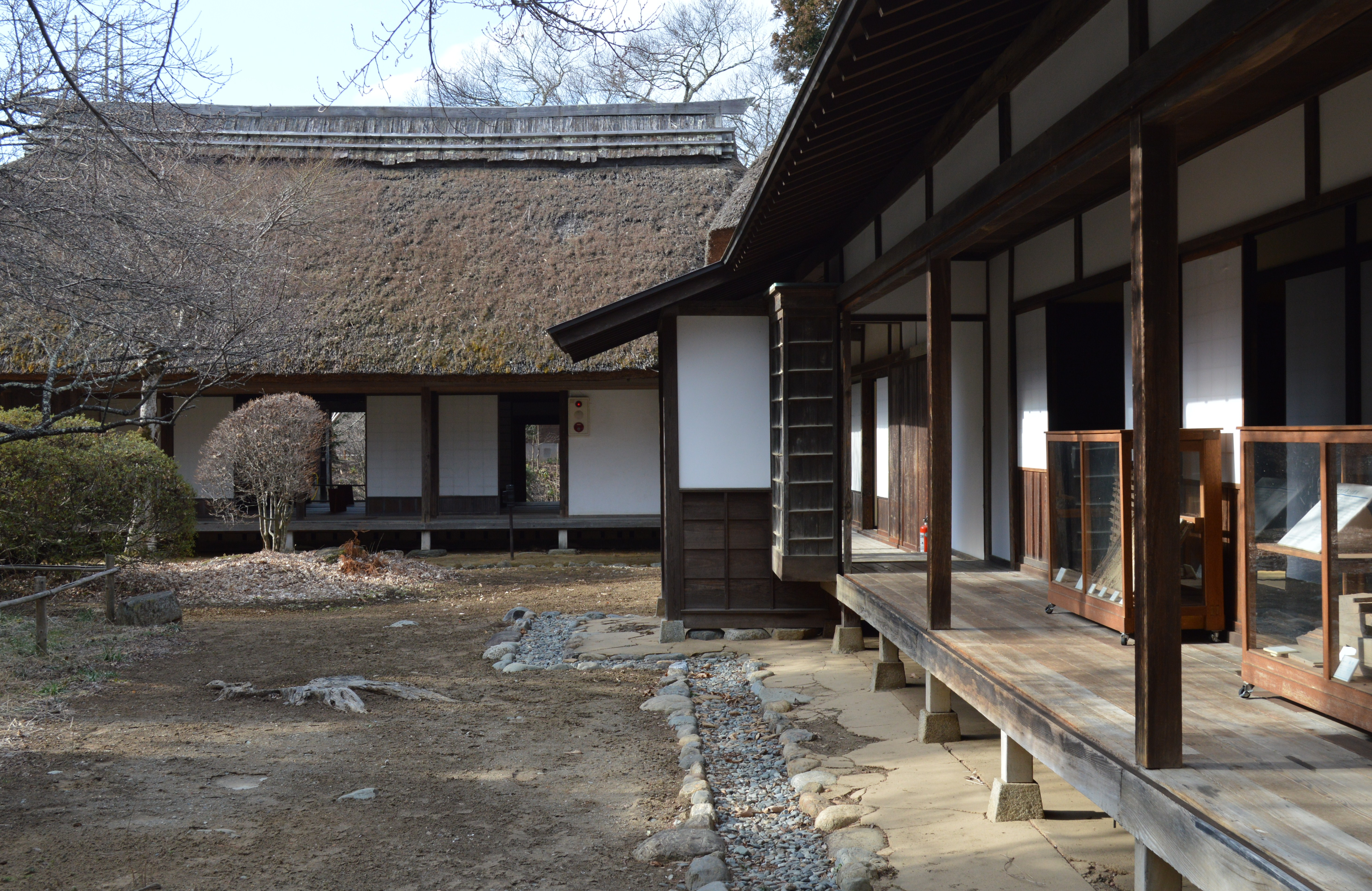
The Shintokukan han school of the Takatō Domain that opened in 1860

The han school was a type of educational institution in the Edo period of Japan. They taught samurai etiquette, the classical Confucian books, calligraphy, rhetoric, fighting with swords and other weapons; some also added subjects such as medicine, mathematics and Western sciences. Schools in different han (domains) provided different curricula and had varied conditions for entry. Over the course of the Edo period, han schools evolved from simple one-room schools to large educational facilities with multiple buildings. The total numbers of han schools varied from several dozen in the early 17th century to over 250 by the end of the 19th century.

== Overview ==
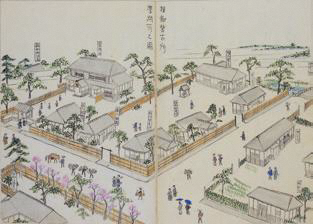
Sōtoku-kan, Nagaoka Domain School

These institutions were known as hangaku (藩学), hangakkō (藩学校) or hankō (藩黌/藩校), but since there was no official requirement of what a han school has to be or to do, the terminology varied. Han schools were established by individual daimyō (rulers of han) to educate male members of the samurai class to be virtuous administrators; originally they taught adults, but over time students were getting younger. They learnt kangaku-juku (Confucian sciences) and military arts

Some upper-class samurai were legally required to get formal schooling, but most could choose not to. Women were never accepted; they received education at home. Some han schools accepted upper commoners, especially in the end of the Edo period; the first one to allow them to enter was the Ōno Domain school founded by Doi Toshitada, in 1857, although lectures were universally segregated by class.

== Curriculum ==
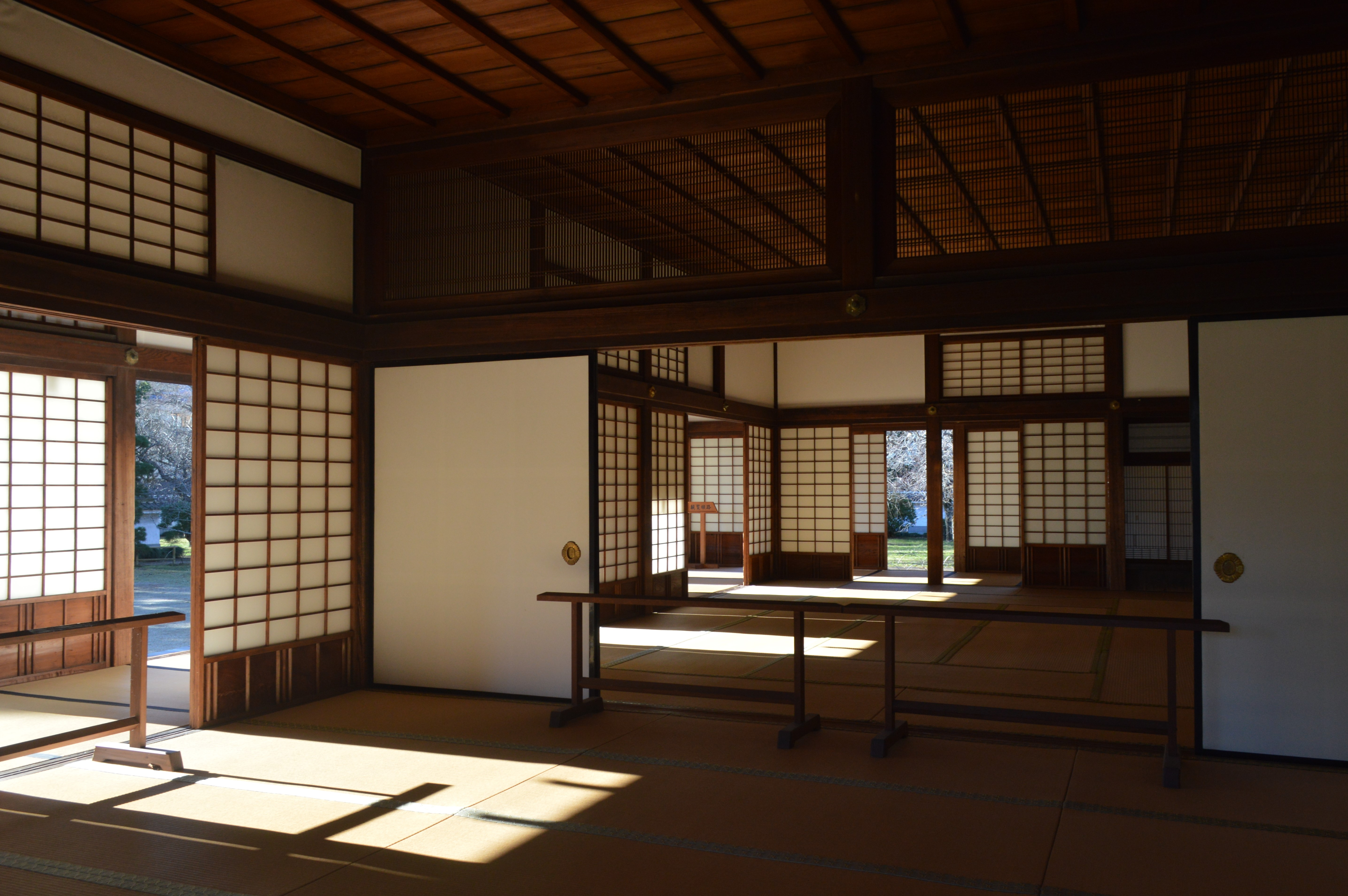
A room in the Kōdōkan

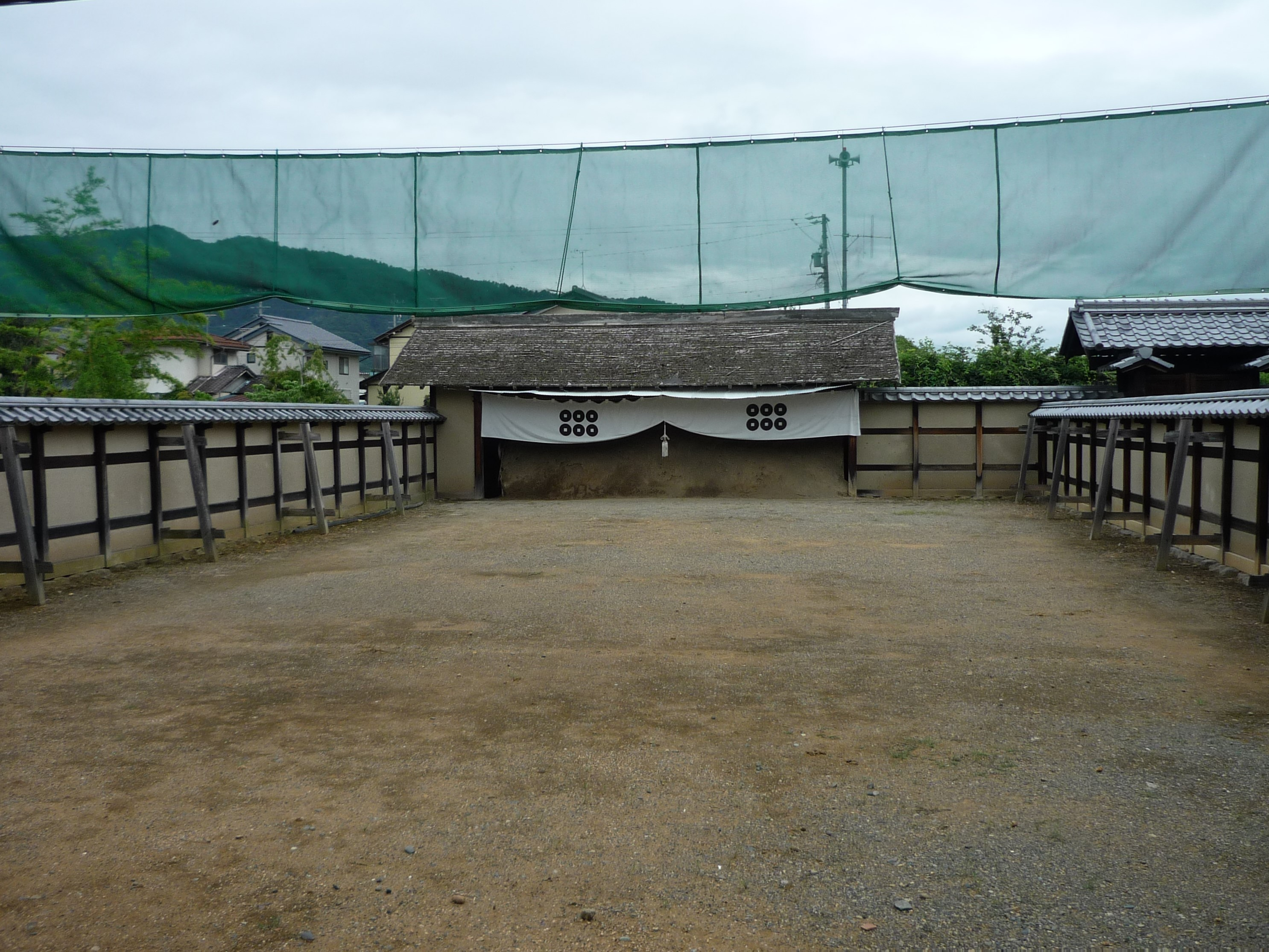
Training grounds of the Matsushiro Literary and Military School

The idea behind the han school learning was to build character of a future state servant: discipline and knowledge of the appropriate etiquette were believed to be as important as the cultivation of intellect. Despite that, attendance was not compulsory in most han, in others there usually was an age limit: for example, in Mito, students over the age of forty were not required to attend lectures.

All students were taught Confucian sciences, but over the course of the Edo period, more and more subjects became available. There was a lot of variation in the actual organisation of han schools: for example, in the Matsumoto han, only lower samurai, who ought to become simple clerks, could study mathematics. By the end of the Edo period, about a third of han schools incorporated kokugaku, while a quarter of them taught at least some rangaku (Western studies, mainly medicine, military and naval sciences).

Students would read Chinese books in the morning, then spend afternoons mastering Japanese martial arts, which were seen as a set of local skills that balances the purely intellectual studies acquired from abroad. Students normally started military training at the age of 15 (Japanese count; corresponds to 13 years according to the Western age counting), after the genpuku ceremony. Among the martial arts taught in han schools were kenjutsu (sword arts), kendo (fencing), sōjutsu (spear fighting), kyūdō (archery), bajutsu (horse riding), jujutsu et cetera; in over 30 han, students learnt combative swimming, suijutsu. Later, gunnery was added to the military curriculum.

=== Chinese studies ===
Confucian studies were seen as the most important part of the education. The han school was built around the assumption that all the truth was supposedly already captured in the Chinese classics and could be extracted with diligent study; the idea of the endless pursuit of knowledge that requires constant questioning and discovery was not accepted. A similar approach was prevalent in the Western pedagogical thought of that time, but the association of Western educational system with Christianity and changes in the social order meant that Tokugawa never allowed it.

The educational process was very academic and conservative; its ultimate political goal was to conserve the rigid hierarchical order of Tokugawa Japan. Students read the Four Books and Five Classics, the Lesser Learning, other works of Confucian and Neoconfucian thinkers such as Zhu Xi and Wang Yangming, studied Chinese history, Chinese poetry and public speaking, but without any official programme. In class, the teacher would read a passage from a text, which the students then repeated several times while holding copies of the book on their knees; then the teacher explained the meaning of the passage. Students did not interpret the text or hold debates about it: because of the idea that the "correct" meaning of the classics had been long discovered, these activities were excluded from the learning process, appearing only sporadically among the literati.

Learning required the knowledge of Classical Chinese, the language of the Confucianist canon, and of calligraphy. Because of the structure of the government, which was modelled after the Chinese government of that time, Confucian books were useful guides for a state serviceman. The instruction in han schools was entirely secular, with no religious leaders teaching, and the Confucian texts were seen as teaching ethics and philosophy, not viewed as a religious scripture. At the same time, most of the schools held the Sekiten festival once or twice per year.

== History and administration ==
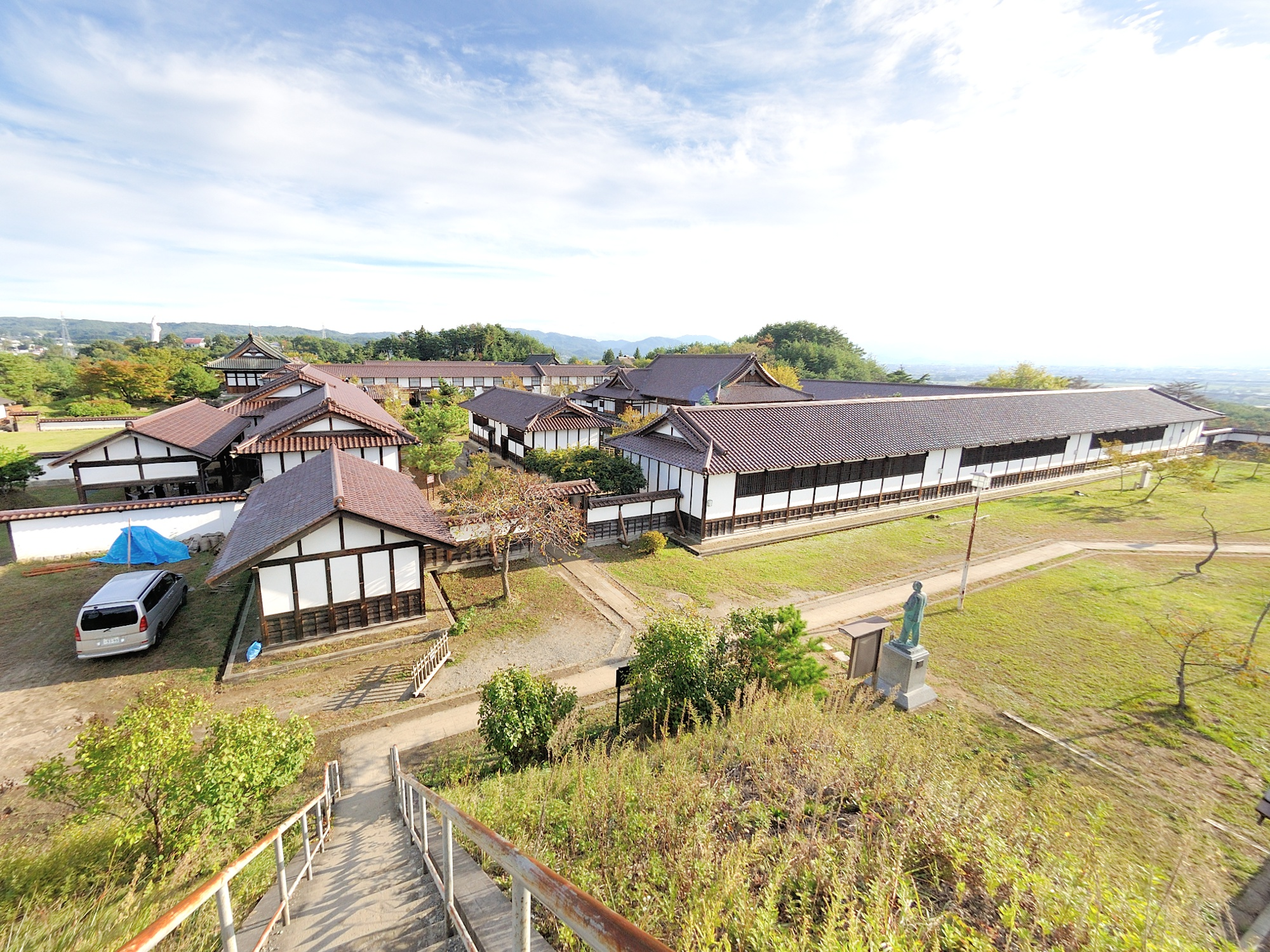
Nisshinkan

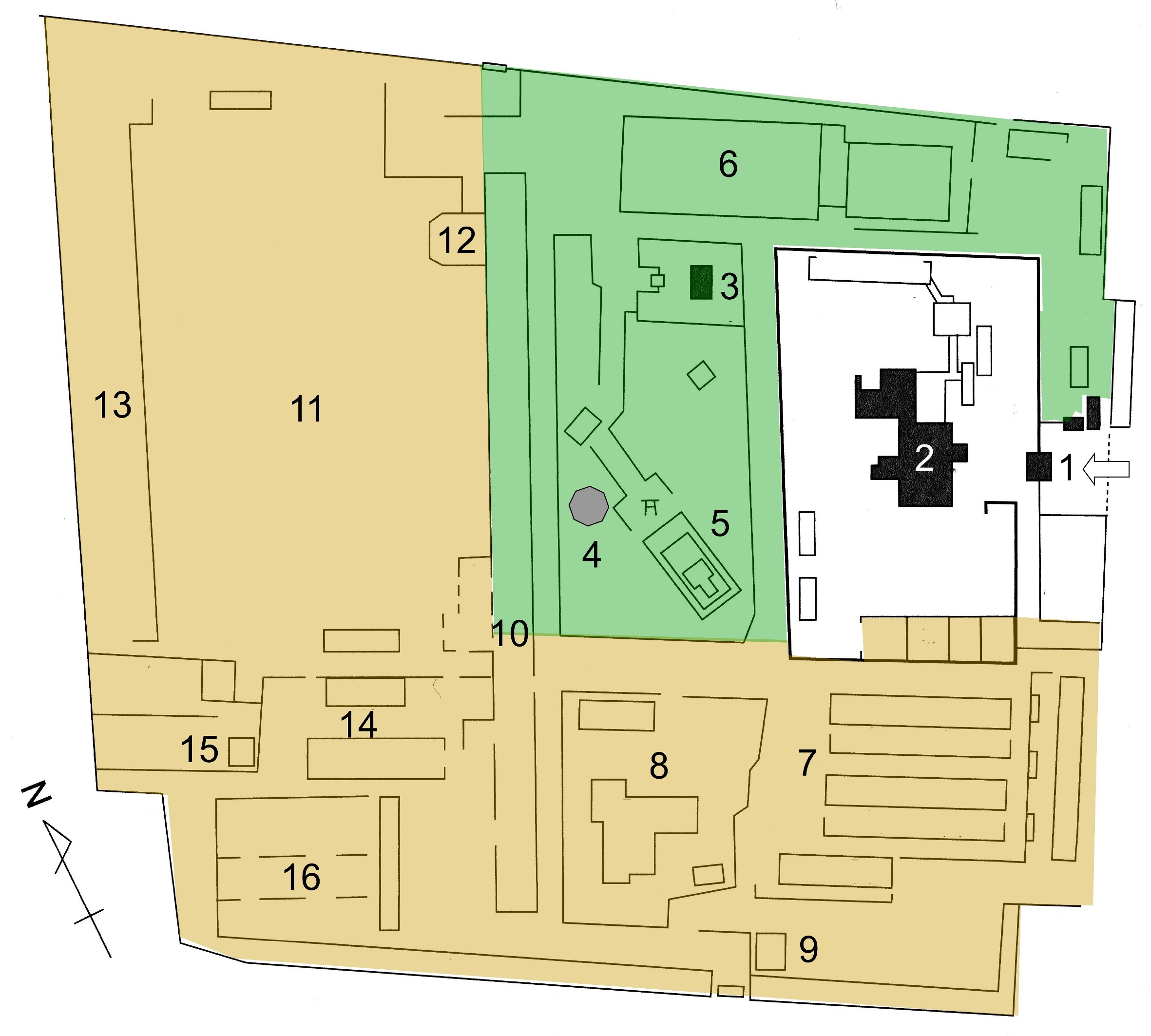
Plan of the Kōdōkan

There was no state office overseeing the education in Tokugawa Japan. Because of that, it is not known when the first han schools appeared; one of the earliest ones was Meirindō (Sendai), first mentioned in 1629. Prior to their establishment, samurai hired private teachers to get education at home.

Early hankō were one-room schools with a single Confucian teacher and a single student; to learn another subject, the student had to hire another teacher. First han schools were run by daimyō's Confucian advisers, jusha. Exams, graduation certificates and the gradual increase in difficulty of the educational material were introduced in the later half of the Edo period. In the years directly preceding the Boshin War, most samurai children except for the lowest-rank families were educated in han schools.

Students usually paid no fees; the schools were funded by the daimyō and by donations from Buddhist temples and private persons. Many of schools also had land plots where their students grew rice and vegetables for sale. They also taught some introductory classes, while the alternating students on duty woke everyone up at dawn, informed teachers that the lecture time is about to start, patrolled the grounds, wrote down the weather conditions and recorded all accidents. The usual punishment for students was detention, in particular, eating alone, and cleaning duty; physical punishment was rare.

The numbers of han schools significantly grew towards the end of the shogunate: just a few appeared in the 17 century, and by 1750, fewer than 30 were founded. The establishment of the Kumamoto han school in 1755 motivated many daimyō to follow their example, but the biggest impulse to open han schools was the Kansei era edict mandating education for the higher administration; in 1751-1867, around 180 schools started working. By the time of the forced opening of Japan in 1853, there were about 250 han schools and around 40,000 commoner schools in Japan. Some of the more famous han schools included Nisshinkan (Aizu), Kōdōkan (Mito), Meirinkan (Hagi, Yamaguchi) and two schools in Kumamoto, Jishūkan and Saishunkan.

Han schools emulated each other and the Shōheikō, but were not subordinate to it; its graduates taught in a third of the han schools. However, the government monitored the schools and punished its personnel for spreading dissident ideas; for example, in 1839 several scholars of Western studies were imprisoned.

In the end of the 18 century, a typical hankō included several buildings: practice and lecture halls, ceremonial halls, dojos for physical training and dormitories. Han schools varied in size; bigger schools were more bureaucratic, so some teachers established shijuku (Japanese: 私塾), independent schools that generally operated in the same fashion as the official han schools, but usually had a focus in a particular field, such as medicine. Students would often live in their teacher's house, fulfilling the Confucian ideal of the society being modelled after a family. Some shijuku had close ties with han schools. Many samurai attended shijuku together with a han school, or went to a han school after finishing a shijuku.

== After the Meiji Restoration ==
By the end of the Edo period about half of the han schools accepted children of wealthy commoners. In 1869 han schools were ordered to accept women and commoners, but almost none applied. The Meiji government abolished the han system in 1871 and the Tokugawa system of formal education during the following decades, but they served as a base for the creation of the modern Japanese middle school. Some high schools picked the name of their local han schools for themselves, as a sign of continuity.
