= Iriki =

Iriki may refer to:

- Iriki, Kagoshima, former town in Japan merged to Satsumasendai in 2004
- 10178 Iriki, a minor planet named for the town

People with the surname Iriki include:

- Satoshi Iriki (入來 智; born 1967), Japanese baseball player
- Iriki-In Shigetomo (入来院 重朝; died 1544), vassal under the Shimazu clan of Satsuma
- Yusaku Iriki (入来 祐作; born 1972), Japanese baseball player
