= Battle of Momotsugi =

The Battle of Momotsugi was fought on 9 October 1539, when an army of the Iriki-In clan, loyal to Shimazu Takahisa, stormed Iwaya Castle (岩田ケ城), then controlled by their rival Shimazu Sanehisa.

Sanehisa, a member of a branch of the Shimazu clan, had been the lord of Izumi Castle in Satsuma Province. In 1526, he rebelled against Shimazu Katsuhisa and managed to expel him from Satsuma Province. Sanehisa attempted to establish himself as an independent power. With the clan's allegiance divided, the Iriki-In clan, led by Iriki-In Shigetomo, remained loyal to Katsuhisa and his successor Shimazu Takahisa.

Iwaya Castle, as Momotsugi Castle (百次城), had been granted to the Iriki-In clan by the Shimazu clan in 1536. However, Shimazu Sanehisa's rival forces continued to hold the castle, motivating Shigetomo to capture it. Shigetomo took the castle in a single night raid, holding it based on the previous grant. The action earned Shigetomo much praise and respect from Takahisa.
