= Shimazu =

Shimazu (島津; Japanese pronunciation: [ɕí.mä̀.(d͡)zɨ̀]) is a Japanese surname. Notable people with the surname include:

- Esther Shimazu (born 1957), American/Hawaiian sculptor
- Saeko Shimazu (born 1959), Japanese voice actress
- Shimazu clan, daimyō of the Satsuma han
- Shimazu Hisamitsu (1817–1887), Japanese samurai prince
- Shimazu Katsuhisa (1503–1573), the fourteenth head of the Shimazu clan
- Shimazu Nariakira (1809–1858), Japanese feudal lord (daimyō)
- Raisei Shimazu (島津 頼盛; born 1999), Japanese footballer
- Shimazu Tadahisa (died 1227), founder of the Shimazu clan
- Shimazu Tadatsune (1576–1638), Tozama daimyō of Satsuma
- Shimazu Tadayoshi (1493–1568), daimyō (feudal lord) of Satsuma
- Shimazu Takahisa (1514–1571), daimyō during Japan's Sengoku period
- Shimazu Toshihisa (1537–1592), senior retainer to the Shimazu clan
- Shimazu Yoshihiro (1535–1619), general of the Shimazu clan
- Shimazu Yoshihisa (1533–1611), daimyō of Satsuma
- Takako Shimazu (born 1939), Japanese princess
- Yasujirō Shimazu (1897–1945), Japanese film director
