= Tsuda Kazunaga =

- 津田 算長

Personal details
- Born: 1499 Japan
- Died: January 22, 1568 (aged 68–69) Kii Province, Japan

Tsuda Kenmotsu Kazunaga (Japanese: 津田 監物 算長; 1499–1568) was a Japanese sōhei and Shingon Buddhist monk of the Negoro-ji. He is credited with overseeing the manufacture of the first Japanese-made matchlock arquebus.

== Biography ==
Tsuda Kazunaga was said to be a descendant of Kusunoki Masashige by way of Tsuda Masanobu (1470–1503). Tsuda used the kikusui crest associated with Masashige.

In 1543, 15-year-old Tanegashima Tokitaka, lord of the island of Tanegashima, purchased two arquebuses from a pair of Portuguese adventurers whose Chinese junk had been driven off-course towards Japan by a storm at sea. Immediately a local blacksmith named Yaita Kinbē was commissioned to reverse engineer the guns' matchlock firing mechanism, but he was unable to replicate the threading of the screws and had to wait until a Portuguese gunsmith could be brought in to provide instruction.

According to the Teppōki compiled for the Tanegashima clan in 1606, Tsuda Kazunaga purchased one of the arquebuses. Tsuda had allegedly been sent to acquire the gun by his brother Suginobō Myōsan, an abbot of the Negoro-ji who was deeply interested in firearms.

After returning to the Negoro-ji, Tsuda turned the gun over to the temple's resident blacksmith Shibatsuji Seiemon who succeeded in copying the matchlock mechanism and became the first gunsmith in Japan to manufacture European-style firearms. The Shibatsuji family later moved to Sakai where they became well known as firearms manufacturers.

Tsuda established the gunnery troops of the Negoro-shū, who came to be renowned as some of Japan's greatest marksmen. He also founded the Tsuda school (津田流, Tsuda-ryū) of gunnery, the first such school in Japan. Tsuda is said to have been taught the basics of European gunnery by a Portuguese man called "Heitarō" (屏太郎), possibly a distortion of the name Pedro (ペイトル, Peitoru). Among other things, the Tsuda school introduced concepts such as leading the target and the use of windsocks to calculate ballistic windage to Japan. He died in 1568.
