= Ichiuji Castle =

Castle ruins in Hioki, Japan

- 一宇治城
- Hioki, Kagoshima, Kagoshima Prefecture, Japan
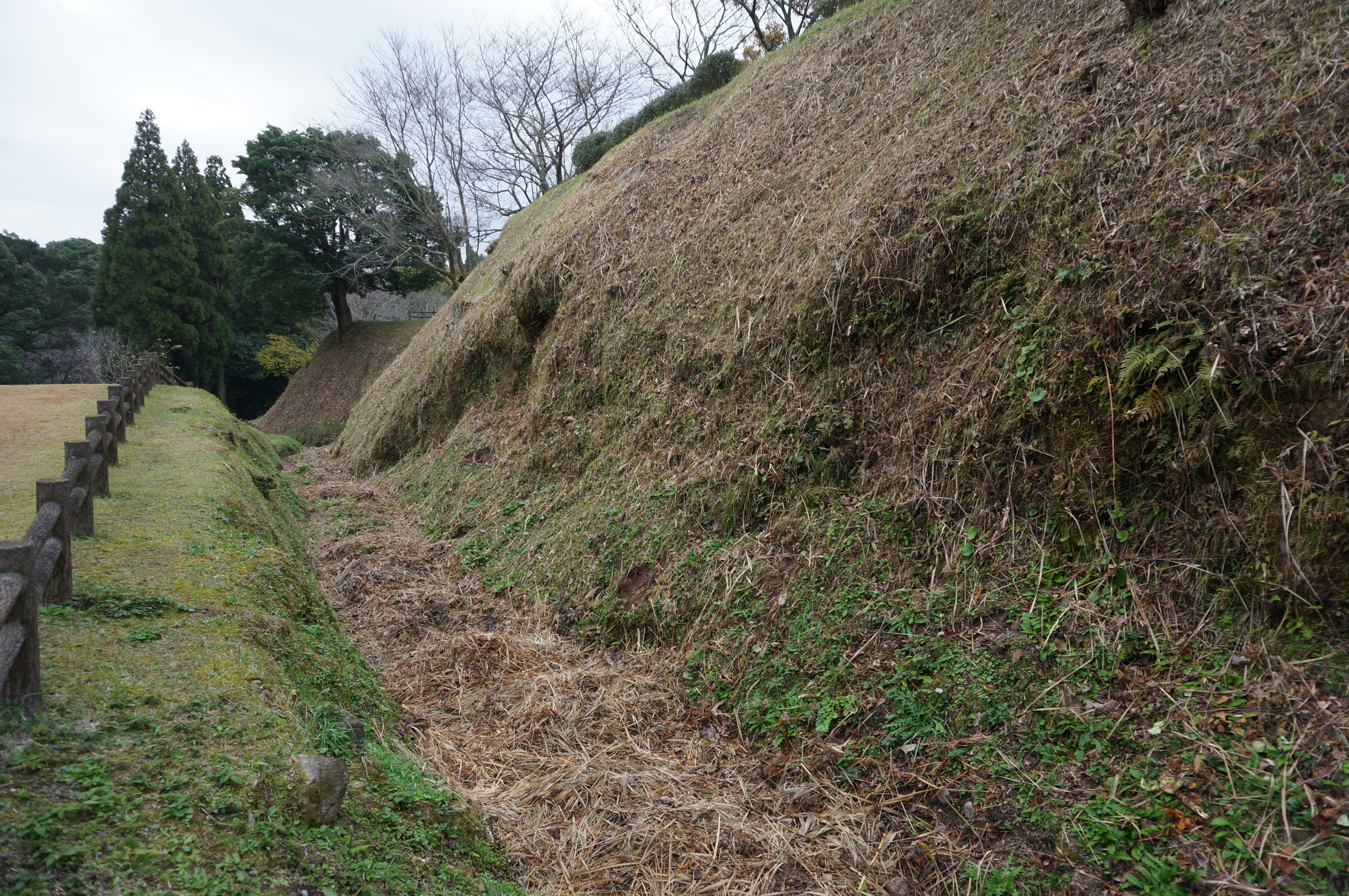
- Dry Moat of Ichiuji Castle

Site information
- Type: Hirayama-style castle
- Owner: Ijuin clan, Shimazu clan
- Condition: ruins

Location
- Coordinates: 31°37′47″N 130°23′21″E

Site history
- Built: 13c
- Built by: Ijuin clan
- Demolished: 17C

Garrison information
- Past commanders: Shimazu Tadayoshi, Shimazu Takahisa

Ichiuji Castle (一宇治城, Ichiuji-jō) is a castle structure in Hioki, Kagoshima Prefecture, Japan. Ichiuji Castle is also called Ijūin Castle.

== History ==
Ichiuji Castle was built by the Ijuin clan and was later controlled by the Shimazu clan. In 1536, Shimazu Takahisa moved the original base of power for the Shimazu clan from Izaku Castle. But Shimazu Takahisa moved to Uchi Castle in 1550. In 1549, Francis Xavier visited the castle to meet Shimazu Takahisa.

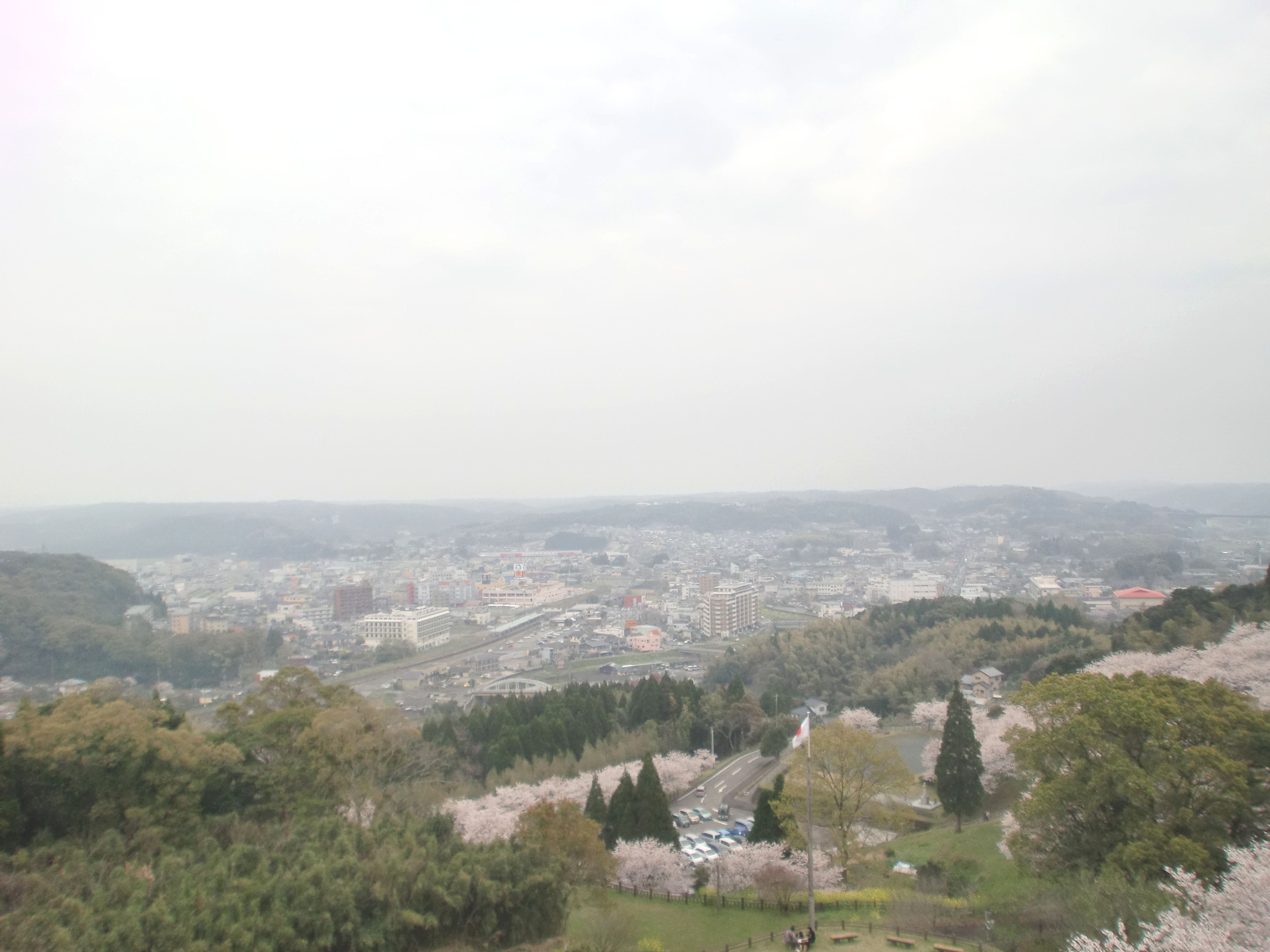
Ijūin city from the castle

== Current ==
The castle is now only ruins, with some moats and earthworks. Francis Xavier`s Statue is on site.

== Access ==
About 20 minutes walk from Ijuin Station.
