= Tanegashima Tokitaka =

Japanese daimyō of the Sengoku period

- 種子島 時堯
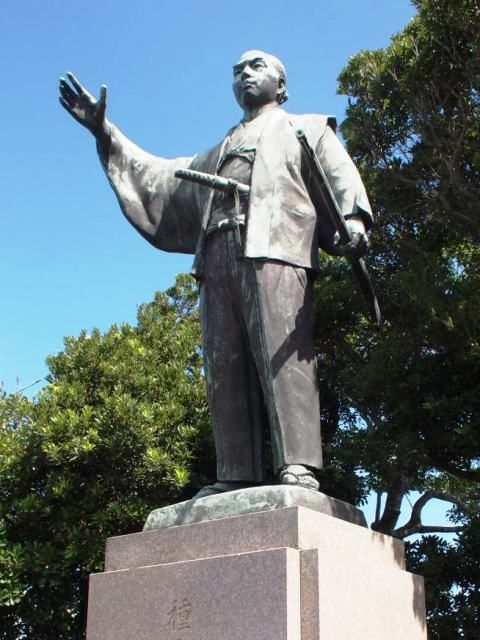
- Born: 1528
- Died: October 21, 1579 (aged 50–51)
- Relatives: Shimazu Yoshihisa (son in law)
- Military career
- Allegiance: Shimazu clan
- Rank: Daimyo
- Unit: Tanegashima clan
- Commands: Tanegashima island
- Conflicts: Siege of Kajiki (1549)

Tanegashima Tokitaka (種子島 時堯; 1528 – October 21, 1579) was a Japanese daimyō of the Sengoku period, the 14th head of the Tanegashima clan. He is known for having first established contact with the Europeans, and his role in the introduction of European type firearms to Japan.

== Early life ==
Tokitaka was born in 1528, the son of Tanegashima Satotoki (種子島恵時), a retainer of daimyō Shimazu Takahisa. Tokitaka was a father in law of Shimazu Yoshihisa. He became head of the Tanegashima clan when his father abdicated.

== Contact with Europeans ==
In 1543, a ship transporting Portuguese sailors, accompanied by a Chinese man named Wufeng, arrived near Tanegashima island. The Europeans were brought to Tokitaka, who was only 15 years old, and demonstrated in front of him the use of arquebus firearms. Lord Tanegashima Tokitaka instructed his swordsmith, Yaita Kinbei Kiyosada (八板金兵衛清定), to create functional replicas of the objects. The smith did not have much of a problem with most of the gun but was unable to fully copy them because "drilling the barrel helically so that the screw (bisen bolt) could be tightly inserted" was a major problem as this "technique did not apparently exist in Japan until this time."

The following year, a Portuguese blacksmith was brought back to Japan and the problem was solved.

Tanegashima Tokitaka, quickly acquired the methods of producing firearms and gunpowder. Due to Tanegashima's role in the spread of firearms, firearms were colloquially known as "Tanegashima (gun)" in Japan. Tanegashima Tokitaka was reported to have constantly practiced with the firearm.

== Siege of Kajiki ==
The Siege of Kajiki was fought in the year of 1549 when forces of the Shimazu clan besieged the castle of Kajiki in Ōsumi Province. The siege succeeded and the castle was taken. Shimazu vassal, Ijuin Tadaaki used a gun given by Tanegashima Tokitaka. The siege is notable for Shimazu Takahisa made use of European arquebuses, being one of the first times "Portuguese derived" arquebuses were used in battle in Japan.

== Death ==
Lord Tokitaka died in October 21, 1579.

== See also ==
- Tsuda Kazunaga
