= Izaku Castle =

Castle ruins in Hioki, Japan

- 伊作城
- Kagoshima Prefecture, Japan
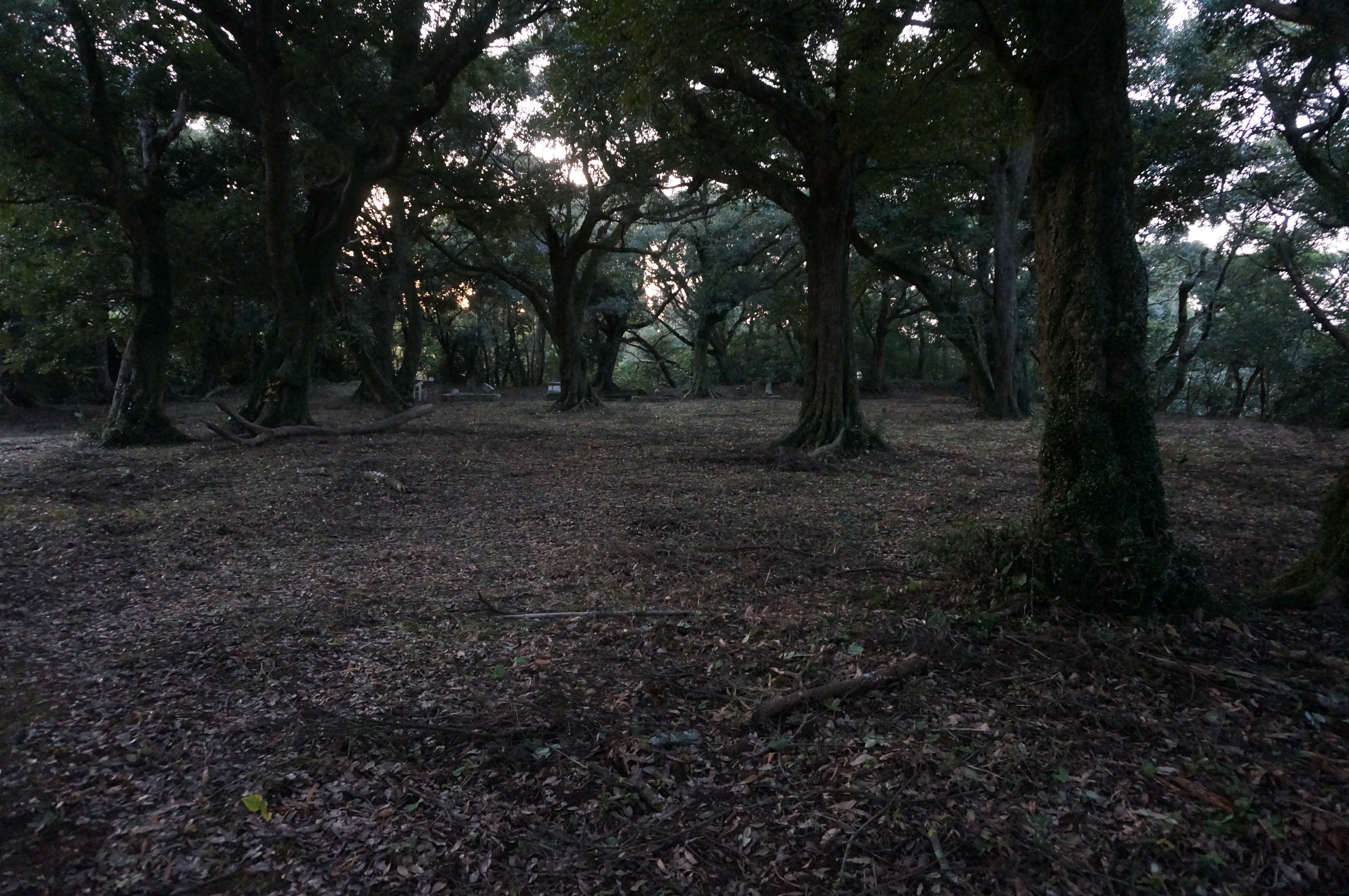
- Kamemaru jo compound of Izaku Castle

Site information
- Type: Hirayama-style castle
- Owner: Shimazu clan
- Condition: ruins

Location
- Coordinates: 31°30′50″N 130°21′47″E

Site history
- Built: 13th century
- Built by: Unknown
- Demolished: 1615

Garrison information
- Past commanders: Shimazu Tadayoshi, Shimazu Takahisa

Izaku Castle (伊作城, Izaku-jō) was a castle structure in Hioki, Kagoshima Prefecture, Japan.

The date of the castle's construction is unknown, but it is believed to have been built by Shimazu Hisanaga in the 13th century. It was the original seat of power for the Shimazu clan until 1536, when Shimazu Takahisa relocated the clan leadership to Ichiuji Castle. It was the birthplace of the warlords Shimazu Tadayoshi, Shimazu Yoshihisa and Shimazu Yoshihiro.

Owing to its significance to the clan, Izaku castle was retained as a stronghold until 1615. The castle is now only ruins, with nothing but some moats and earthworks remaining.

== Gallery ==
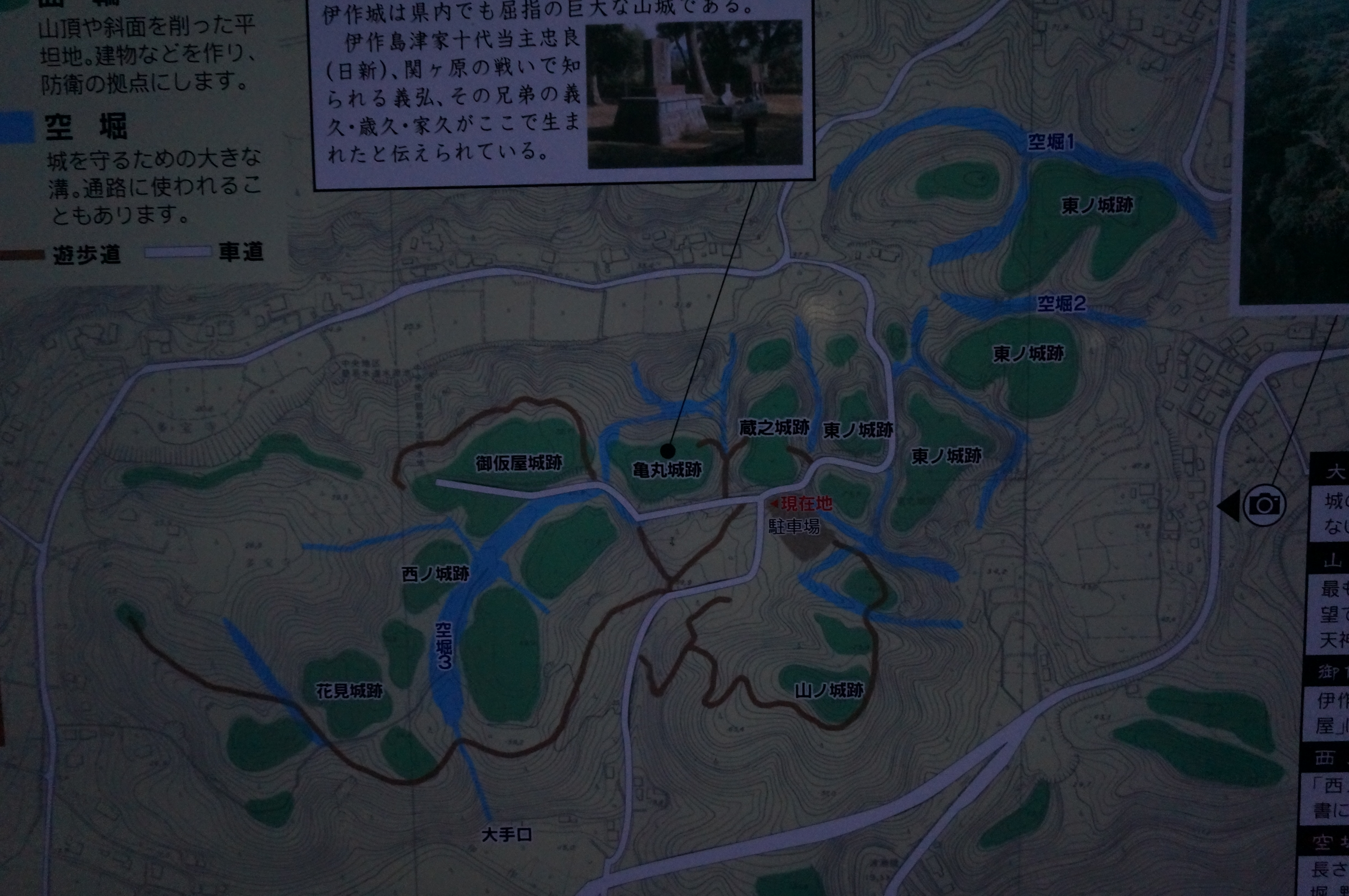
Map of Izaku Castle

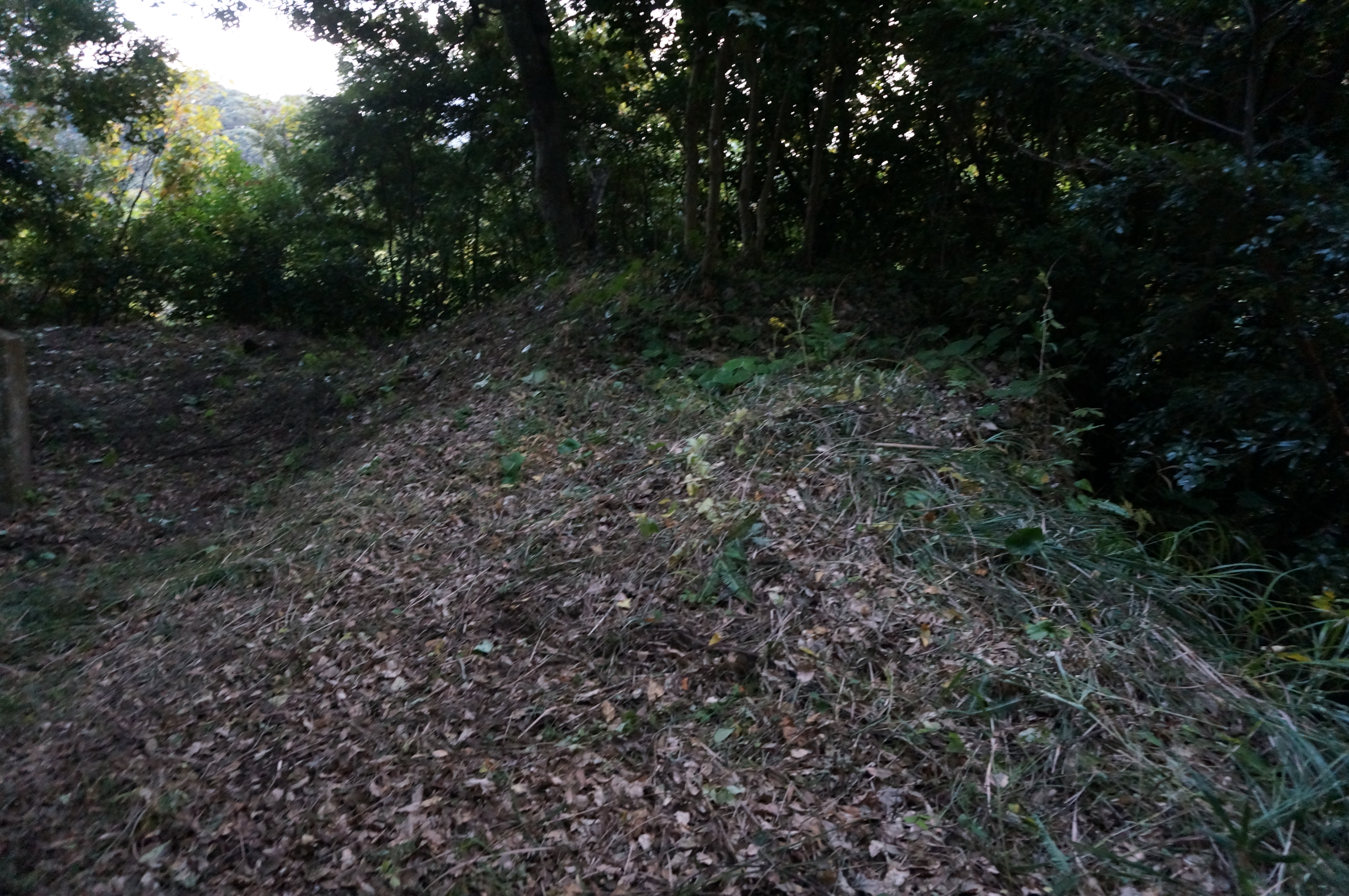
Earthen wall of Kamemaru jo compound
