= Iwatsurugi Castle =

Iwatsurugi Castle 岩剣城
- Aira, Kagoshima, Japan
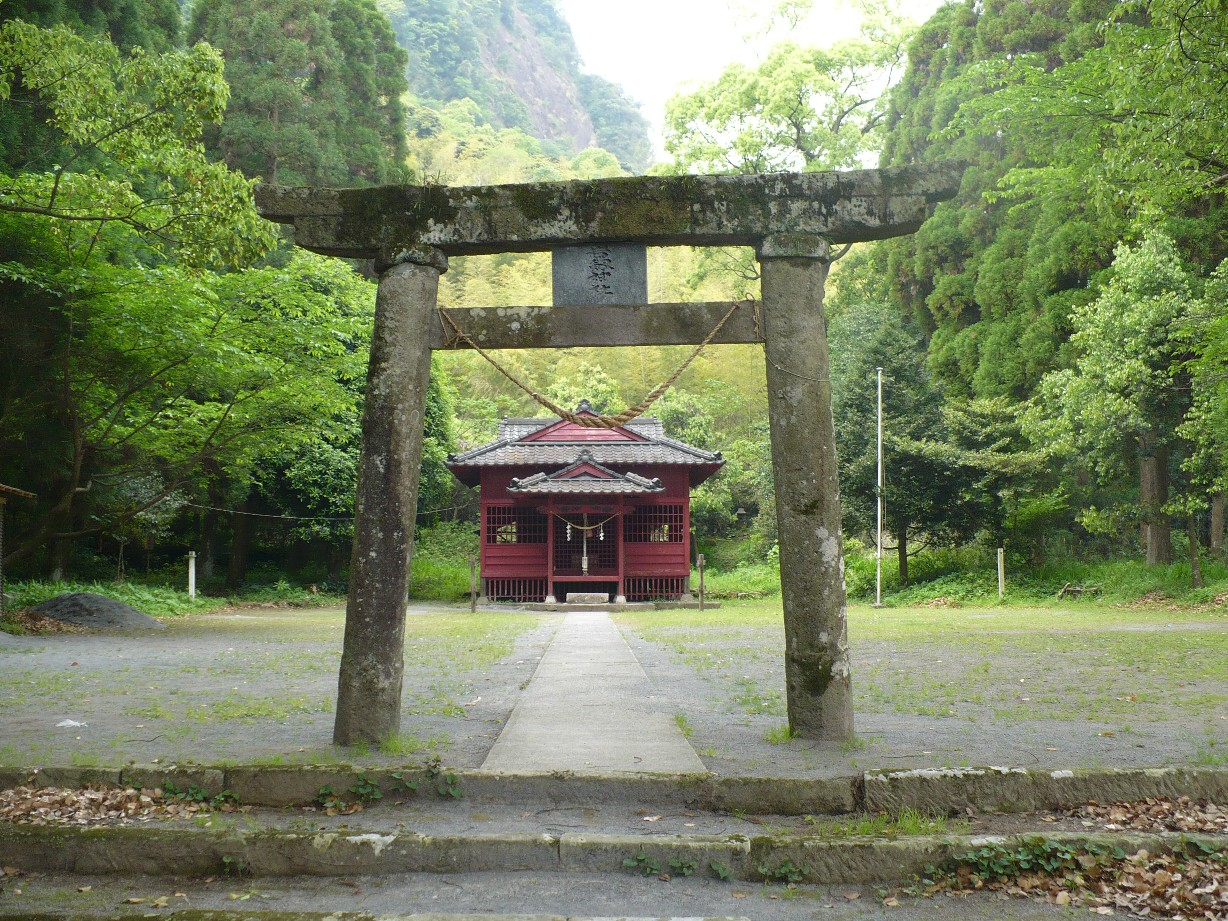
- The haiden of Iwatsurugi Shrine in 2008

Site information
- Type: Japanese castle
- Controlled by: Kedōin clan Shimazu clan
- Condition: Ruins

Location
- Location within Japan
- Coordinates: 31°42′21″N 130°35′55″E

Site history
- Built: Unknown
- Built by: Kedōin Yoshishige
- In use: c. 1550–1607
- Battles/wars: Siege of Iwatsurugi Castle (1554)

Iwatsurugi Castle (岩剣城, Iwatsurugi-jō) is a ruined medieval Japanese castle located near the city of Aira, Japan. The castle is known as the site of the first battle of Shimazu Yoshihiro and, allegedly, the first place in Japan where matchlock firearms were used in battle.

== Summary ==
Iwatsurugi Castle was built by Kedōin Yoshishige, a vassal of the Shimazu clan. Kedōin selected a position at the peak of Mt. Iwatsurugi (岩剣山; transl. 'Tsurugi Rock'), a natural fortress surrounded on three sides by sheer cliffs rising more than 100 m (330 ft). The castle was small, but the impassable terrain surrounding it provided strong defenses.

In the 1550s, Kedōin Yoshishige joined forces with Hishikari Takaaki and Gamō Norikiyo in a rebellion against their master, Shimazu Takahisa. In 1554, Hishikari and Gamō attacked Kajiki Castle, a stronghold of Shimazu loyalists. As part of a strategy to divide his enemy and reduce pressure on Kajiki Castle, Takahisa ordered his sons — Yoshihisa, Yoshihiro, and Toshihisa — to attack Kedōin at Iwatsurugi Castle. As Takahisa had planned, Gamō diverted his forces to relieve Kedōin but was intercepted and destroyed by the Shimazu. Heavily outnumbered, Kedōin's retainers defended the castle fiercely, even joined by the women.

It was believed that the castle had been difficult to take despite its small size due to the uncanny protection of Iwatsurugi Shrine at the base of the mountain. During the siege, Shimazu forces removed the shrine's yorishiro and transferred it to their field headquarters. They swore before it that if the spirit of Iwatsurugi Shrine allowed them to take the castle, they would dedicate a yearly sacred dance in commemoration. That night, it is said, the castle fell when Kedōin Yoshishige fled through a postern under cover of darkness and escaped to another stronghold. The women left behind jumped off the cliffs to avoid being captured alive.
