= Katō Shrine =

Katō Shrine 加藤神社
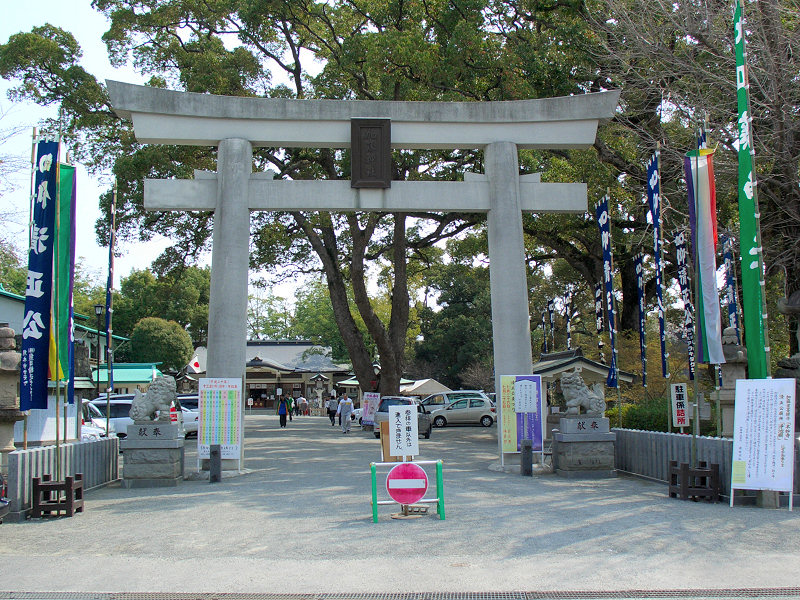
- A torii at Katō Shrine

- Location within Japan

Religion
- Affiliation: Shinto
- Deity: Katō Kiyomasa; Ōki Kaneyoshi and Kin Kan
- Type: Prefectural Shrine

Location
- Location: 2-1, Honmaru, Chūō-ku, Kumamoto, 860-0002
- Interactive map of Katō Shrine 加藤神社
- Coordinates: 32°48′13.34″N 130°42′24.22″E

Architecture
- Established: 1871, as Nishikiyama Shrine

Website
- www.kato-jinja.or.jp

Katō Shrine (加藤神社, Katō-jinja) is a shrine in Kumamoto Castle, Chūō-ku, Kumamoto, Kumamoto, Japan, in which daimyō or powerful territorial lord Katō Kiyomasa (1562–1611) is enshrined. Alongside Ōki Kaneyoshi and Kin Kan, who made junshi, are enshrined.

== History ==
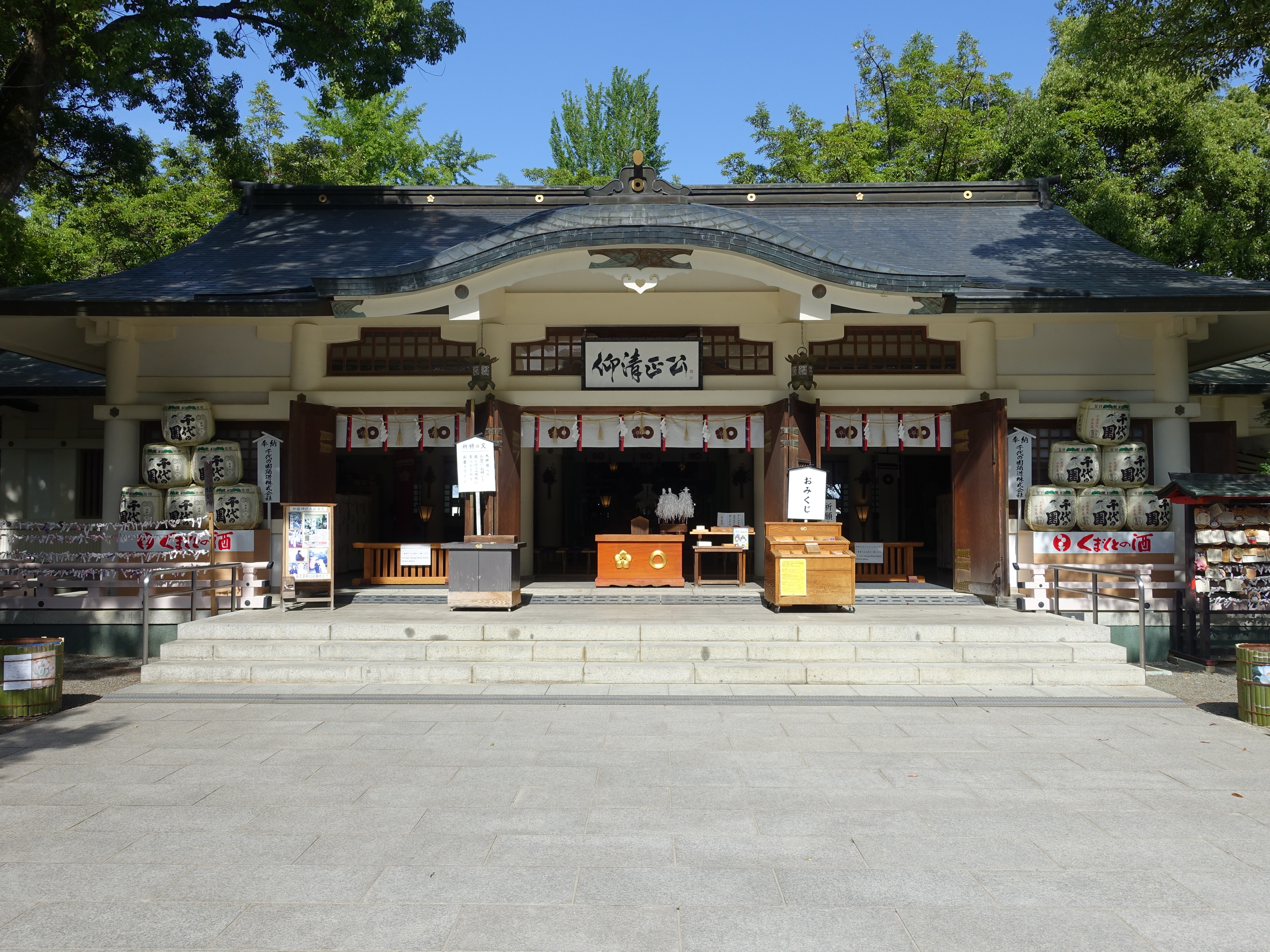
The Honden of Kato Shrine

- In 1868, Shinto style ceremony started at Jōchibyō which was the grave of Katō Kiyomasa in Honmyōji, proposed by Nagaoka Moriyoshi.
- In 1871, Nishikiyama Shrine was built within Kumamoto Castle at the separation of Buddhism and Shintoism. Enshrined are Katō Kiyomasa, Ōki Kaneyoshi and Kin.
- In 1874, the Nishikiyama Shrine was moved to Kyōmachi because the Kumamoto Castle belonged to the Japanese Army in 1873.
- In 1875, the rank of the shrine was made the prefectural shrine. This system discontinued in 1946.
- In 1877, the Nishikiyama Shrine was burned in the battle of Satsuma Rebellion. Shintai was moved to Kengun Shrine.
- In 1884, reconstruction was started.
- In 1886, the shrine was reconstructed.
- In 1909, the name of Nishikiyama Shrine was changed to Katō Shrine.
- In 1911, a Katō Shrine was built in Hawaii.
  - Closed later.
- In 1914, a Katō Shrine was built in Seoul.
  - Closed after the war.
    - Katō Kiyomasa is enshrined in about 90 shrines; about a half in Kumamoto Prefecture.
- In 1952, Katō Shrine was designated as Religious corporation.
- In 1962, Katō Shrine was moved to the present site in Kumamoto Castle.
- In 1981, the Sūkeikai, an association of Katō Shrine goers, was started.

== Festivals ==
- Spring festival: April 24
- Summer festival: July 24
- Katō Kiyomasa festival: the 4th Sunday of July
- Monthly ceremonies: 1st, 15th and 24th of every month

== Ōki and Kin ==
- Ōki Kaneyoshi (1552–1611) was a karō of Sassa Narimasa. After the fall of Sassa, he became a karō of Katō Kiyomasa. During the Japanese invasion of Korea, his services, or merits were great. At the Sekigahara battle, he made the wife of Katō Kiyomasa escape from the Osaka house.
- Kin Kan was a Korean who was captured in the Japanese invasion of Korea. His real name was 良甫鑑, and Kin Kan was the name of his position. He became a fan of Katō Kiyomasa and followed his master and became a page.

== Features and Memorials ==
Katō Shrine is located best to view the three high buildings of Kumamoto Castle.

=== Memorials ===
- Taiko bridge, placed within the campus of the shrine, was brought from Korea as a memorial, and served as the model of stone bridges.
- A large washbasin belonged to Ooki Kaneyoshi who is enshrined.
- A flag-holding stone was brought from Nagoya, Saga Prefecture, in connection with the invasion of Korea.

=== Small shrines ===
- Enshrined are Sarutahiko-kami, Sugawara Michizane, Ookuninushi-kami and Ebisu-kami.
