= Iriki-In Shigetomo =

Iriki-In Shigetomo (入来院 重朝; died 1544) was a vassal under the Shimazu clan of Satsuma. He was the son of Iriki-in Shigetoshi, of the Iriki-In clan.

In 1526, the lord of the Shimazu clan, Shimazu Katsuhisa, suffered the rebellion of a kinsman, Shimazu Sanehisa, and was forced to flee Satsuma. The leadership of the Shimazu clan was then passed on to Katsuhisa's eldest son, Shimazu Takahisa. Even though Takahisa was the new head, Katsuhisa still had authority over a good amount of land. As the Iriki-In clan's lands were very close to those of the Shimazu clan, they found themselves part of the conflict.

Due to his and his father's military achievements, the Iriki-In clan was awarded Momotsugi Castle (百次城), in 1536, and Kōriyama Castle (郡山城) the following year. At the time, Momotsugi Castle was known as Iwaya Castle (岩田ケ城), and was held by Shimazu Sanehisa's forces.

In 1539, Shigetomo stormed Iwaya Castle in a night raid, later called the Battle of Momotsugi. This event increased Shigetomo's reputation, earning the respect of Shimazu Takahisa. During the following year, Shigetomo overcame many forts, such as Hirasa (平佐), Kumano Castle (隈之城), Miyasato (宮里), Tazaki (田崎), and Takae (高江), gaining prominence within Satsuma for his clan.

However, during the years to follow, Shigetomo's relationship with Shimazu Takahisa began to sour, after rumors arose that Shigetomo was plotting a rebellion against Takahisa, despite Shigetomo's younger sister being Takahisa's wife and mother of the Shimazu clan's heir Shimazu Yoshihisa. In 1544, Shigetomo died, and Takahisa captured Kōriyama Castle for himself, in the Siege of Kōriyama Castle.

== Works cited ==
- 阿部猛 (Takeshi Abe); 西村圭子 (Keiko Nishimura), eds. (August 1990). 戦国人名事典 [Sengoku Biographical Dictionary] (in Japanese) (コンパクト版 ed.). Shin-Jinbutsuoraisha. ISBN 4-404-01752-9.
- 鹿児島県史料刊行委員会, ed. (1973). 本藩人物誌 [Biographical History of the Domain]. 鹿児島県史料集 (in Japanese). Vol. 13.
