= Katō Kiyomasa =

Japanese daimyō of the Azuchi–Momoyama and Edo periods (1562–1611)

- 加藤 清正
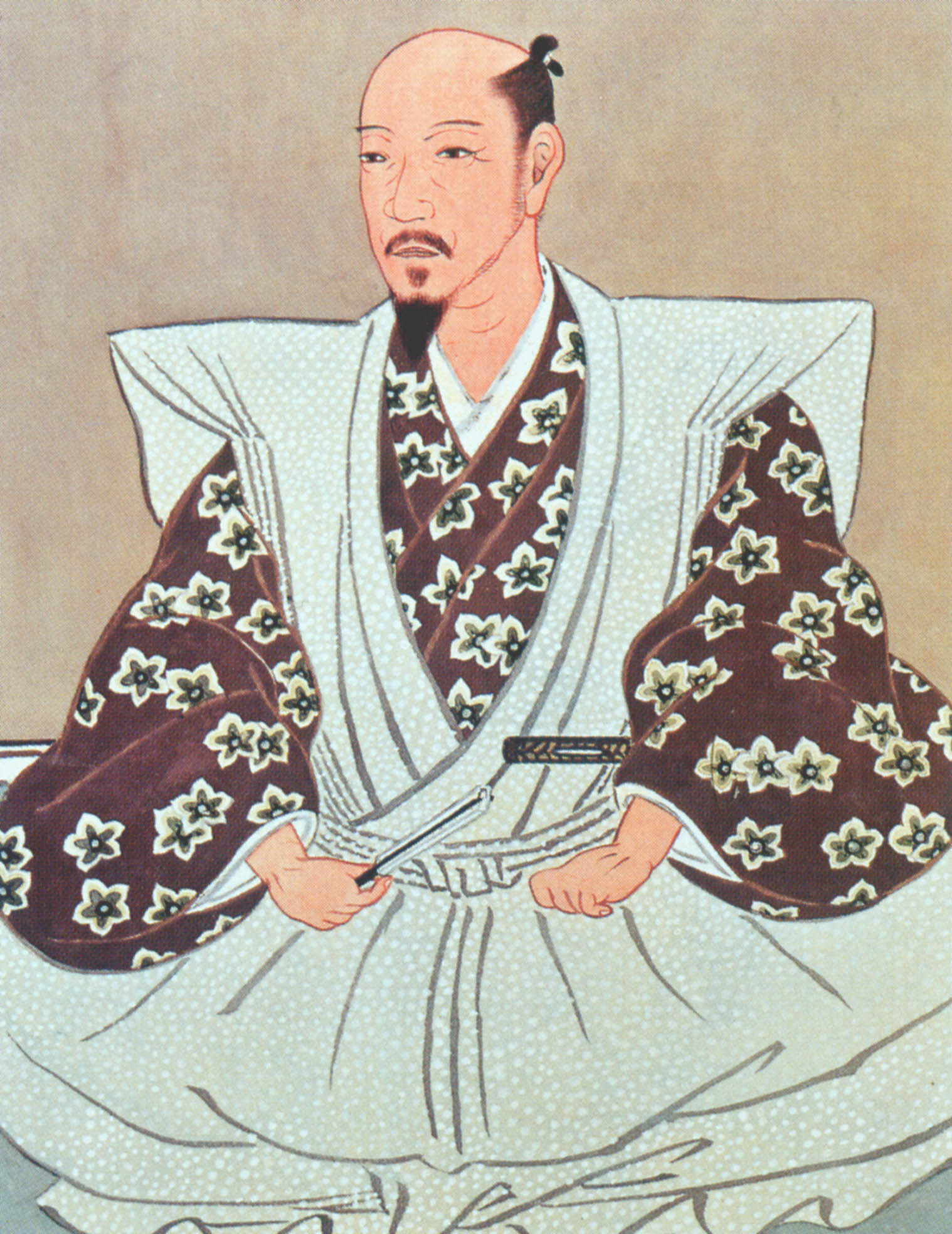

Lord of Kumamoto
- In office 1587–1611
- Succeeded by: Katō Tadahiro

Personal details
- Born: Toranosuke; July 25, 1562 Owari Province, Japan
- Died: August 2, 1611 (aged 49) Kumamoto, Japan
- Spouse: Shōjō-in
- Children: Katō Tadahiro; Yōrin-in
- Religion: Nichiren Buddhism
- Nickname: Kishokan ('Devil General') (Note: https://www.thefreelibrary.com/Kato%2C+Kiyomasa+(Toranosuke)+(1562-1611).-a016842983)

Military service
- Allegiance: Toyotomi clan Eastern Army; Tokugawa shogunate
- Unit: Katō clan
- Commands: Kumamoto Castle
- Battles/wars: Siege of Tottori; Siege of Takamatsu; Battle of Yamazaki; Battle of Shizugatake; Battle of Komaki and Nagakute; Kyūshū campaign Korean Campaign; Siege of Udo; Siege of Yanagawa

Japanese name
- Kanji: 加藤 清正
- Hiragana: かとう きよまさ
Transcriptions
- Romanization: Katō Kiyomasa

Katō Kiyomasa (加藤 清正; Japanese pronunciation: [kaꜜ.toː (|) kʲi.jo.ma.sa], July 25, 1562 – August 2, 1611) was a Japanese daimyō of the Azuchi–Momoyama and Edo periods. His court title was Higo no Kami (肥後守; lit. 'Chief of Higo'). His name as a child was Yashamaru, and first name was Toranosuke. He was one of Hideyoshi's Seven Spears of Shizugatake.

== Early life ==
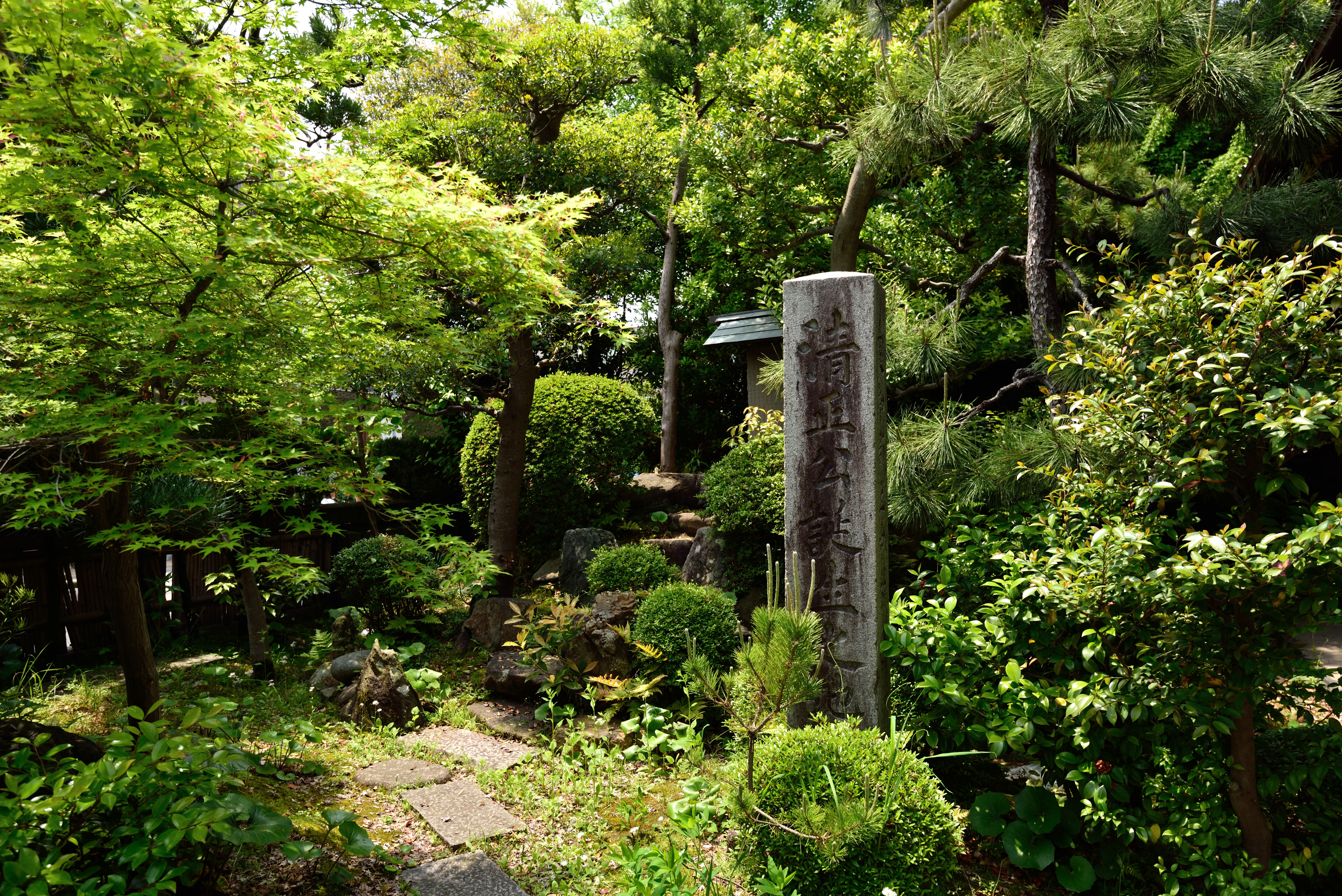
Katō Kiyomasa's birthplace monument（Nakamura-ku, Nagoya）

Kiyomasa was born in what is now Nakamura-ku, Nagoya to Katō Kiyotada. Kiyotada's wife, Ito, was a cousin of Toyotomi Hideyoshi's mother. Kiyotada died while his son, then known as Toranosuke, was still young. Soon after, he entered into Hideyoshi's service, and in 1576, at age 15, was granted a stipend of 170 koku.

In 1582, he fought in Hideyoshi's army at the Battle of Yamazaki, and later in 1583 at the Battle of Shizugatake. Owing to his achievement in that battle, he became known as one of the Seven Spears of Shizugatake and was rewarded with 3,000 additional koku.

In 1584, Kiyomasa took part in the Battle of Komaki and Nagakute against the Tokugawa clan.

When Hideyoshi became the kampaku in the summer of 1585, Kiyomasa received the court title of Kazue no Kami (主計頭, head of the accounting bureau) and junior 5th court rank, lower grade (ju go-i no ge 従五位下).

In 1587, he fought in the Kyūshū campaign against the Shimazu clan. Later, after Higo Province was confiscated from Sassa Narimasa, he was granted 250,000 koku of land in Higo, roughly half of the province, and Kumamoto Castle as his provincial residence.

== Korean campaign ==
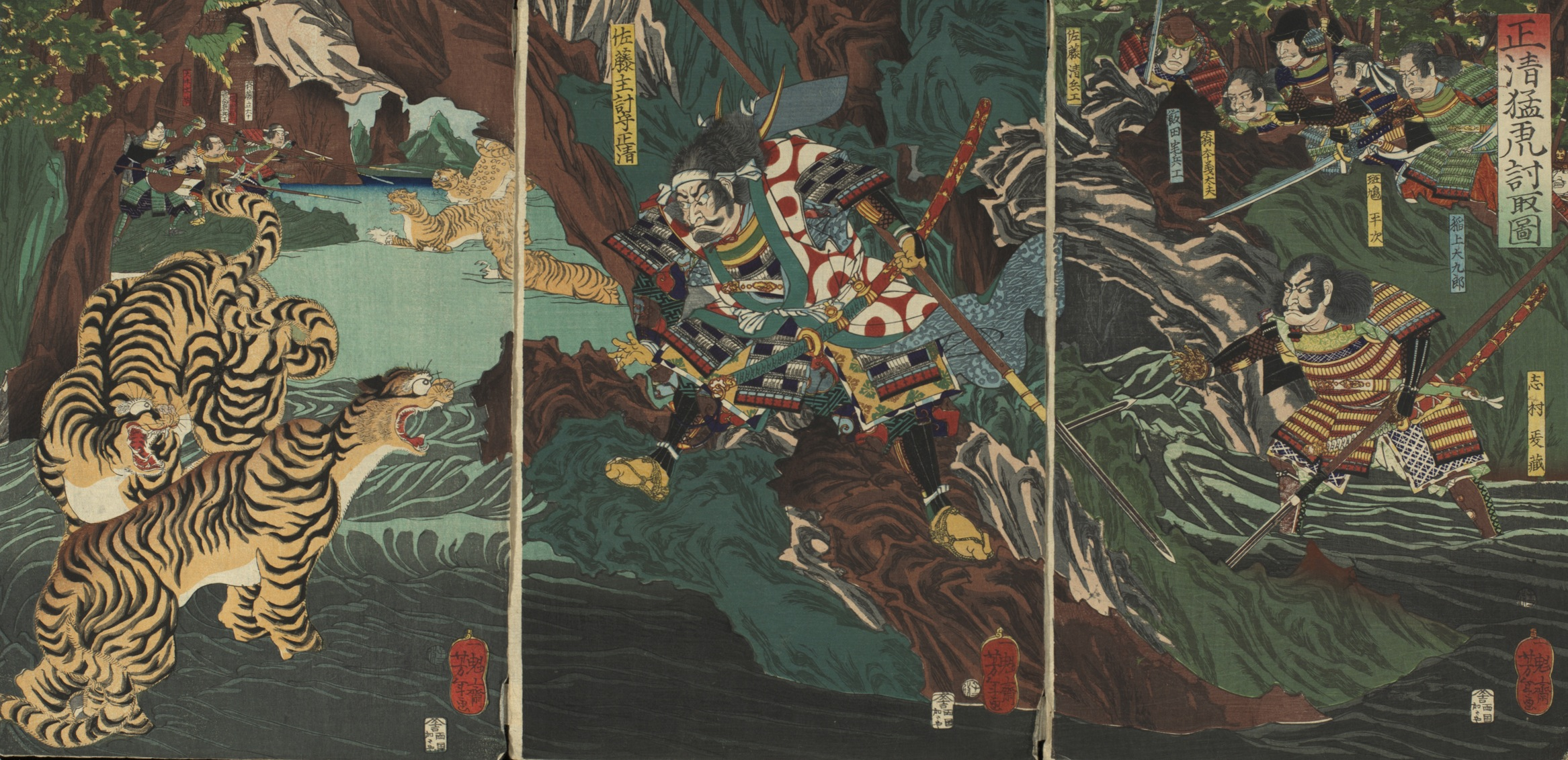
Kiyomasa hunting a tiger in Korea. Tiger hunting was a common pastime for the samurai during the war.

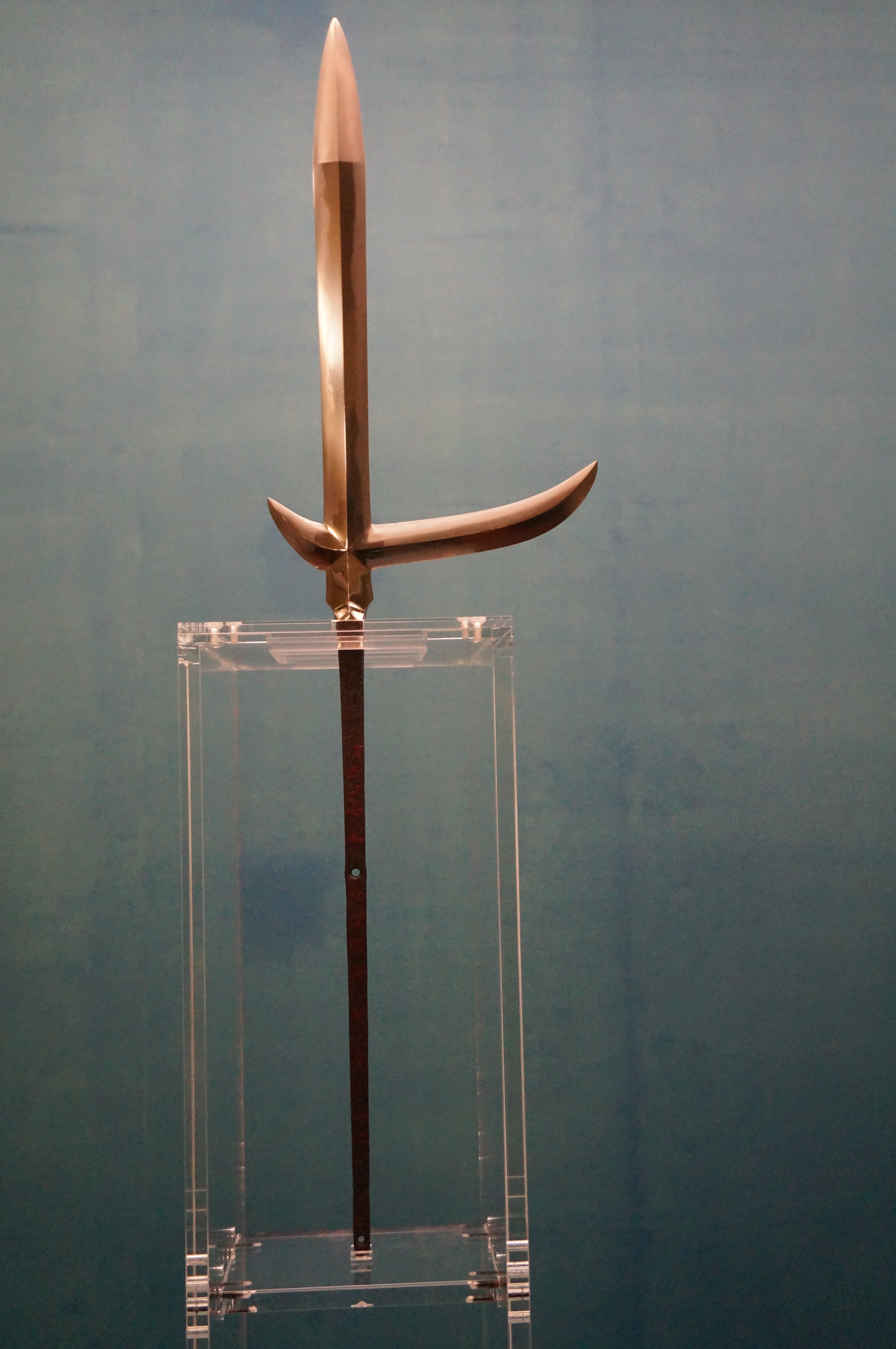
Katakama yari ("single-sided sickle spear") spearhead used by Kiyomasa in tiger hunting. Tokyo National Museum

Kiyomasa was one of the three senior commanders during the Seven-Year (Imjin) War (1592–1598) against the Korean Joseon. Together with Konishi Yukinaga, he captured Seoul, Busan and many other cities. He defeated the last of the Korean regulars at the Battle of Imjin River and pacified Hamgyong.

The Korean king Seonjo abandoned Seoul before Kiyomasa's forces. Kiyomasa held two Korean princes who had deserted hostage and used them to force lower-ranking Korean officials to surrender. During the war, he apparently hunted tigers for sport, using a yari (spear), and later presented the pelts to Hideyoshi. Some versions of the story say he was in fact hunting tigers to catch them alive, in order to bring their meat to Hideyoshi, as he thought it would improve his lord's health, but that later on the tigers were killed, because his men were starving.

Kiyomasa was a renowned castle-builder. During the Imjin war he built several strategic Japanese-style castles in the territories he conquered. Ulsan castle among them and became the site of Kiyomasa's most famous battle — the Siege of Ulsan on December 22, 1597. Kiyomasa led the defense of the castle, successfully holding at bay Chinese general Yang Hao's army, which numbered 60,000. He defended the castle until November 23, 1598. However, his bravery was not reported to Hideyoshi by his rival and superior Ishida Mitsunari. Hideyoshi recalled him to Kyōto.

Like a number of other daimyōs who participated in the invasion of Korea, he took a group of captive Korean potters back to his fief in Kyūshū.

== Sekigahara campaign ==
=== Conflict with Ishida Mitsunari ===
According to popular theory, after the death of Toyotomi Hideyoshi in 1598, the government of Japan was shaken by an incident, where seven military generals —Fukushima Masanori, Katō Kiyomasa, Ikeda Terumasa, Hosokawa Tadaoki, Asano Yoshinaga, Katō Yoshiaki, and Kuroda Nagamasa—conspired to kill Ishida Mitsunari. Supposedly the group was disstatisfied with Mitsunari, as he wrote bad assessments and underreported the achievements of those generals during the Imjin war against Korea and the Chinese empire.

At first, these generals gathered at Kiyomasa's mansion in Osaka Castle, and from there moved to attack Mitsunari's mansion. However, Mitsunari had knowledge of the conspiracy through a report from a servant of Toyotomi Hideyori, and hid in Satake Yoshinobu's mansion together with Shima Sakon and others. When the conspirators found out that Mitsunari was not in his mansion, they searched the mansions of various feudal lords in Osaka Castle, and Kato's army also approached the Satake residence. Mitsunari and his party escaped and barricaded themselves at Fushimi Castle. The next day, the seven generals surrounded Fushimi Castle with their soldiers as they knew Mitsunari was hiding there. Tokugawa Ieyasu, who was in charge of political affairs in Fushimi Castle tried to arbitrate the situation. The seven generals requested Ieyasu to hand over Mitsunari, which was refused. Ieyasu then negotiated the promise to let Mitsunari retire and to review the assessment of the Battle of Ulsan Castle, which had been the major source of this incident, and had his second son, Yūki Hideyasu, escort Mitsunari to Sawayama Castle.

However, historian Watanabe Daimon stated that, from the primary and secondary sources about the incident, that it was more of legal conflict between those generals and Mitsunari, rather than a conspiracy to murder him. The role of Ieyasu was not to protect him from any physical harm, but to mediate the complaints of the seven generals.

Nevertheless, historians viewed this incident not just as simply personal problems between the seven generals and Mitsunari, but rather as an extension of the political rivalries between the Tokugawa faction and the anti-Tokugawa faction led by Mitsunari. After the incident, military figures on bad terms with Mitsunari would support Ieyasu during the Sekigahara campaign between the Eastern Army led by Tokugawa Ieyasu and the Western Army led by Ishida Mitsunari. According to Muramatsu Shunkichi, writer of The Surprising Passions and Desires of the Heroes and Heroines of Japanese History, the reason for Mitsunari failure in his war against Ieyasu was his unpopularity among the major political figures of that time.

After the incident, Kiyomasa joined forces with Tokugawa Ieyasu and during the Sekigahara campaign (August–October 1600) fought Ishida's allies on Kyushu, taking a number of castles. He was preparing to invade the Shimazu domain when the campaign ended and Ieyasu ordered him to stand down. For his service, Katō was awarded the other half of Higo, bringing his income to nearly 500,000 koku.

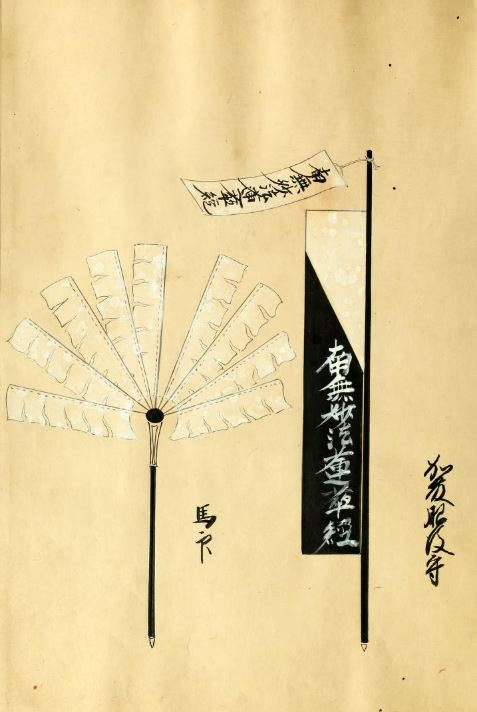
Katō Kiyomasa (1562–1611) banner and battle standard

== Death ==
In his later years, Kiyomasa tried to work as a mediator in the increasingly complicated relationship between Ieyasu and Toyotomi Hideyori. In 1611, en route—by sea—to Kumamoto after one such meeting, he fell ill, and died shortly after his arrival. He was buried at Honmyō-ji temple in Kumamoto, but also has graves in Yamagata Prefecture and Tokyo. Kiyomasa is also enshrined in many Shinto shrines in Japan, including Katō Shrine in Kumamoto.

His son, Katō Tadahiro, succeeded him as the provincial governor of Higo, but his fief (Kumamoto) was confiscated, and he was exiled (kaieki; attaindered) in 1632 by Tokugawa Iemitsu on suspicion of conspiring against him, possibly together with Tokugawa Tadanaga, who was ordered to commit seppuku in 1633.

== Personality ==
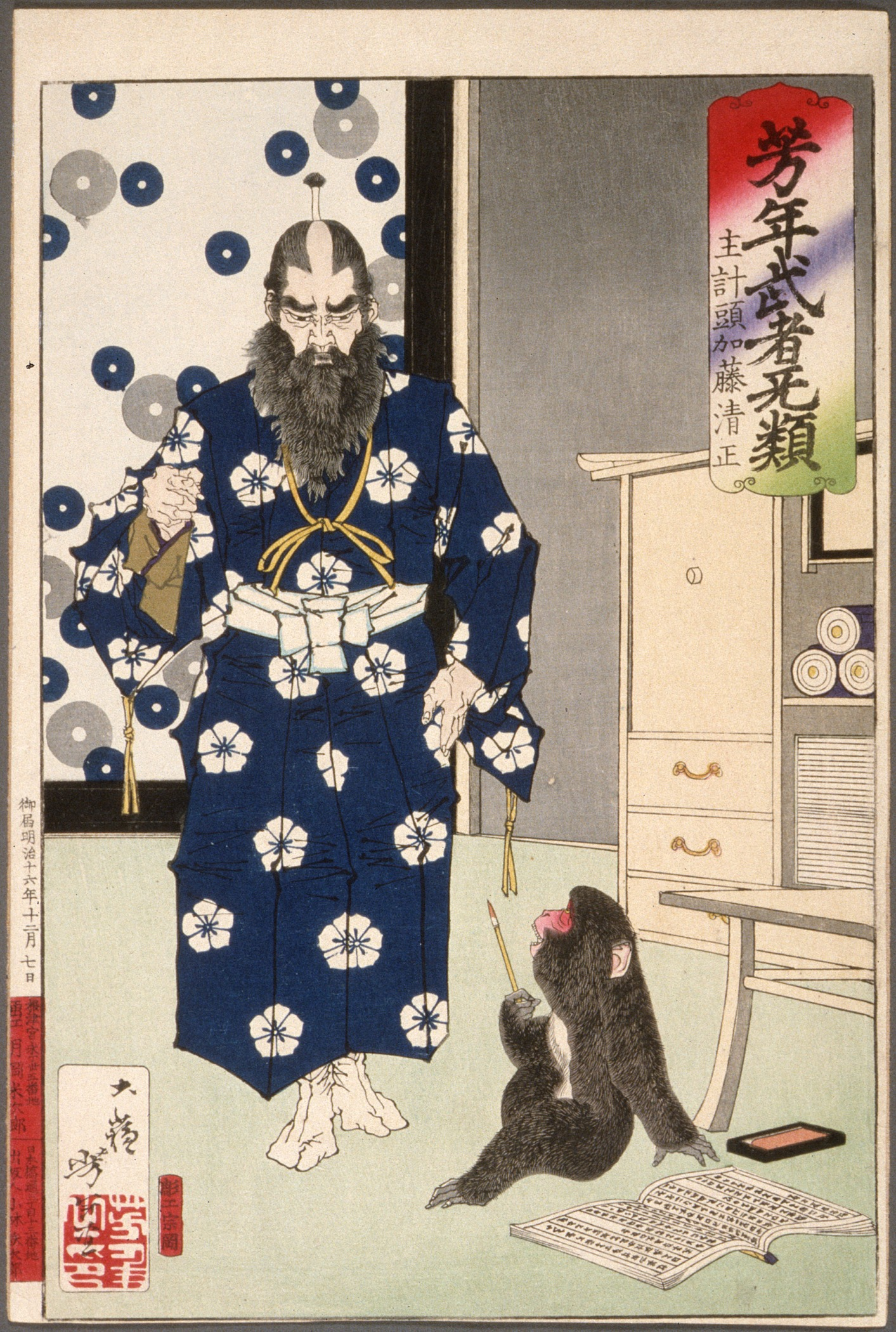
Kiyomasa and his macaque. by Tsukioka Yoshitoshi

A devoted believer of Nichiren Buddhism, Kiyomasa encouraged the building of Nichiren temples across his domains. He came into conflict with Konishi Yukinaga, who ruled the other half of Higo province, and was a Christian, Kiyomasa being noted for brutally suppressing and persecuting Christianity. At the battle of Hondo, he ordered his men to cut open the bellies of all pregnant Christian women and cut off their infants' heads.

William Scott Wilson describes Katō Kiyomasa as such: "He was a military man first and last, outlawing even the recitation of poetry, putting the martial arts above all else. His precepts show the single-mindedness and Spartan attitudes of the man, [they] demonstrate emphatically that the warrior's first duty in the early 17th century was simply to 'grasp the sword and die'.

During his tenure in the Korean campaign, a famous anecdote attributed to Kiyomasa's recounts Kuroda Nagamasa hunting a tiger during his free time. Recent research revealed that this was falsely attributed to Kiyomasa, while the feat was actually applied to Nagamasa.

== Family ==
Kiyomasa married a daughter of Mizuno Tadashige, Shōjō-in, who was adopted by Tokugawa Ieyasu prior to their marriage. Their daughter, Yōrin-in, would go on to marry Tokugawa Ieyasu's 10th son, Tokugawa Yorinobu.

== Honour ==
In 1910, Kiyomasa was posthumously promoted to junior 3rd court rank (jusanmi 従三位).

== In popular culture ==
Katō Kiyomasa is a character in the Koei video games Kessen, Kessen III, Samurai Warriors 3, Samurai Warriors 4, Mōri Motonari: Chikai no Sanshi and Age of Empires III. He is a playable character in Pokémon Conquest (Pokémon + Nobunaga's Ambition in Japan), with his partner Pokémon being Fraxure and Haxorus.

== See also ==
- Katō Yoshiaki
- Battle of Sendaigawa

== Notes ==
Preceded by none	Daimyō of Kumamoto; 1587–1611	Succeeded by Katō Tadahiro
