= Siege of Kajiki =

1549 battle in Japan during the Sengoku Period

Coordinates: 31°44′59″N 130°40′09″E

- Part of Sengoku period
| Date | May 1549 |
| Location | Kajiki, Ōsumi Province |
| Result | Shimazu victory |

Belligerents
| Shimazu clan | Kajiki castle garrison |

Commanders and leaders
| Shimazu Takahisa; Ijuin Tadaaki; Tanegashima Tokitaka | |

Strength
| 2,600 | 320 |

Casualties and losses
| 210 | 320 Entire garrison killed |

The siege of Kajiki was fought in 1549. The Shimazu clan besieged the Kajiki castle in what is now Kagoshima prefecture, Japan. The siege succeeded and the castle was taken. The siege is notable for the first time "Portuguese derived" arquebuses were used in battle in Japan.

Shimazu Takahisa attacked the castle of Kajiki in Ōsumi Province, in southern Kyushu. Ijuin Tadaaki, a Shimazu vassal, used a gun provided by Tanegashima Tokitaka.

Shimazu Takahisa proceeded to enlarge Shimazu holdings on the island of Kyushu during the following several years.
