= Ijūin Tadaaki =

Vassal of the Shimazu clan (1520–1561)

Ijuin Tada'aki(伊集院忠朗; 1520–1561) was a retainer of the Japanese Shimazu clan during the Sengoku period of Japan. Under Tada'aki, the Ijuin clan rose to prominence as one of the most important vassals of the Shimazu clan.

He served under Shimazu Tadayoshi and Shimazu Takahisa, who were essential in uniting the Shimazu clan. Tada'aki had his troops use matchlock guns at the Siege of Kajiki in 1549. This was the first use of firearms by the Shimazu army. He also fought in battles against the Ito clan and Kimotsuki clan, and at the Siege of Iwatsurugi in 1554. For these and other contributions and services, he held the post of the top karō until 1556 and governed as the top official of the clan.

While having a party with Kimotsuki Kanetsugu in 1561, Tada'aki offended Kanetsugu so badly that the humiliated Kanetsugu started a war that the Shimazu clan wanted all along.
