= Kumamoto Domain =

Region in Japan

Kumamoto Domain 熊本藩 Kumamoto-han
- Domain of Japan
- 1600–1871
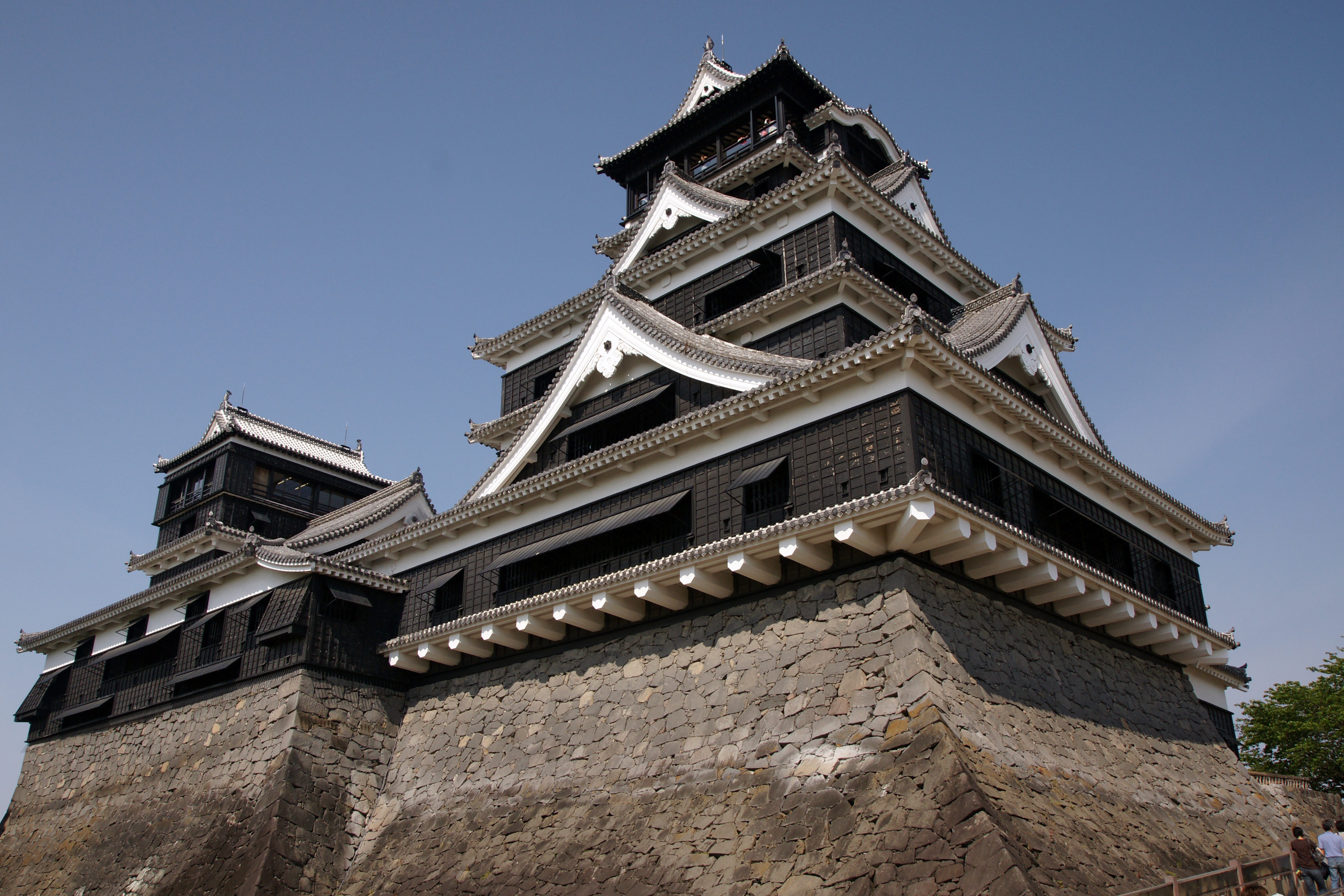
- Keep of Kumamoto Castle

- Mon of the Hosokawa clan
- Capital: Kumamoto Castle
- Government
  - Type: Daimyō
- Daimyō
  - 1588-1611: Kato Kiyomasa (first)
  - 1870-1871: Hosokawa Morihisa (last)
- Historical era: Edo period Meiji period
  - Established: 1600
  - Disestablished: 1871
- Today part of: Kumamoto Prefecture

The Kumamoto Domain (熊本藩, Kumamoto-han), which was in existence from 1600 to 1871, had a significant influence in the region. Initially, it controlled its vast territory of 520,000 koku, which later expanded to 540,000 koku after the division of the 8th generation territory and the establishment of branch domains during the Hosokawa family era. In 1871, the domain faced territorial changes as it lost control over Kuma District and Amakusa District in Higo Province (present-day Kumamoto Prefecture), as well as parts of Bungo Province (now Oita Prefecture), including Tsuruzaki and Saganoseki. This domain was also known as Higohan and its administrative center was situated at Kumamoto Castle in Kumamoto City. Despite not having complete control over Higo, the Hosokawa clan of the Kumamoto Domain held the status of feudal lords, or Daimyo, in the region.

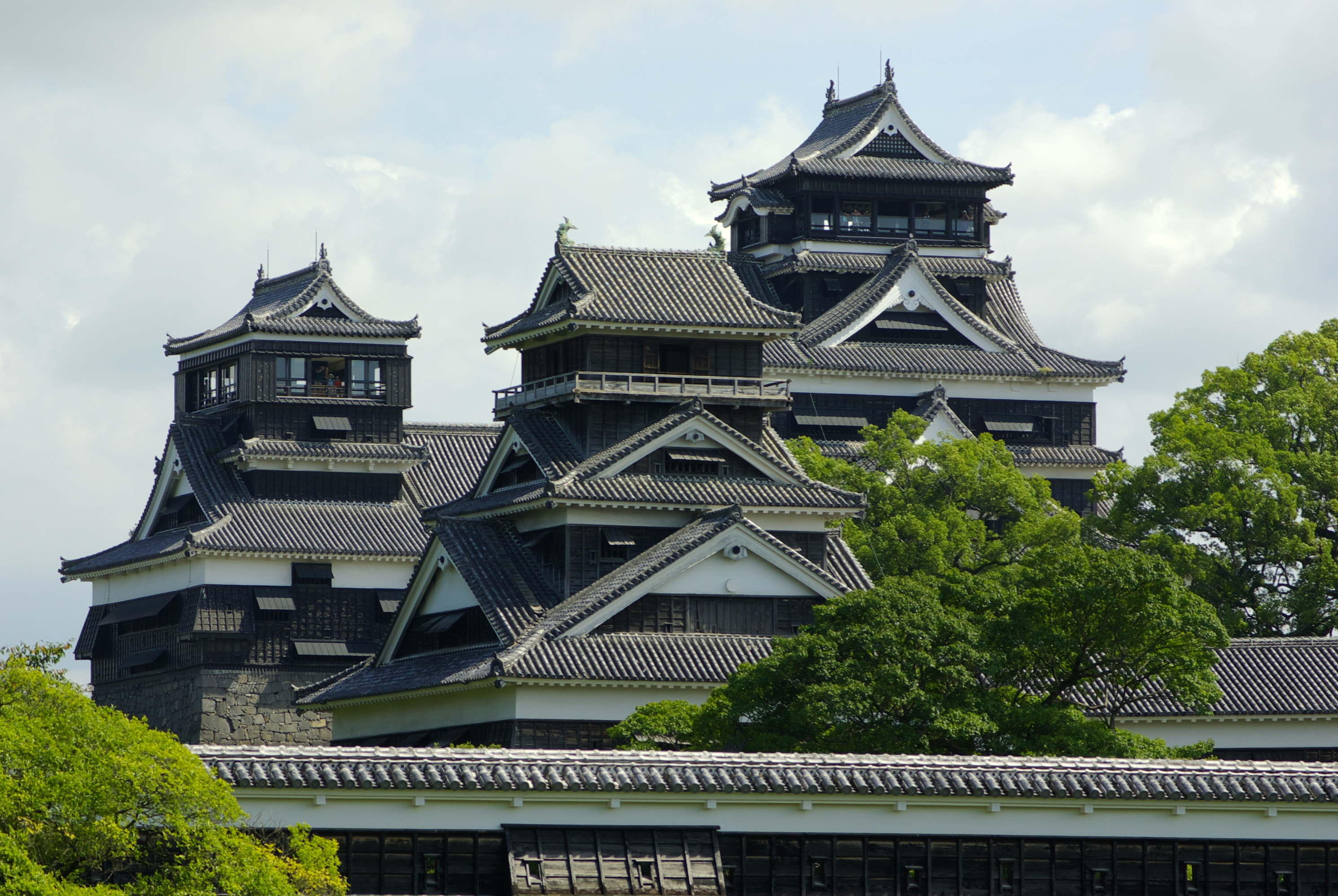
A turret and tenshu of Kumamoto Castle

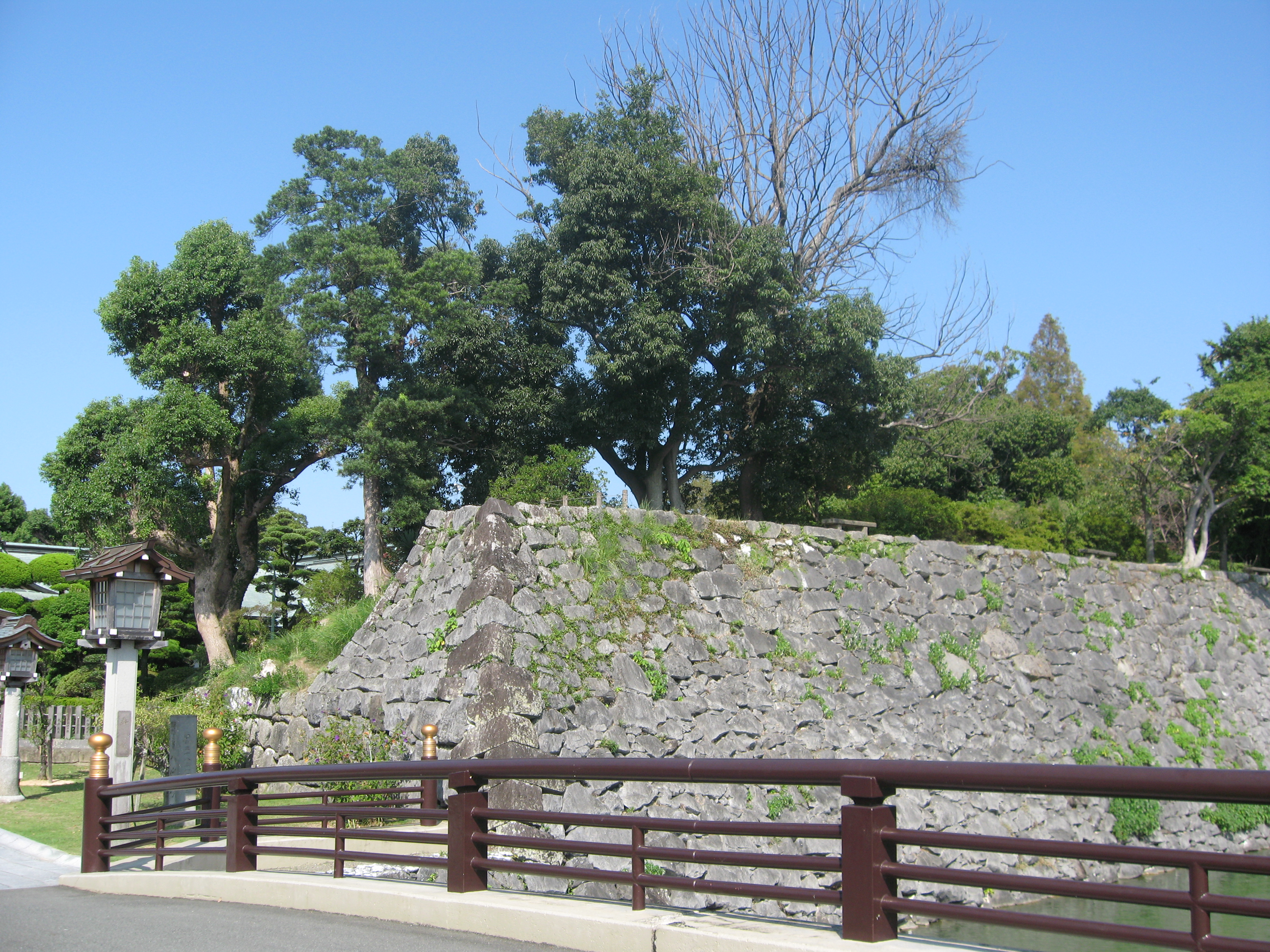
Stonework at Yatsushiro Castle in Kumamoto

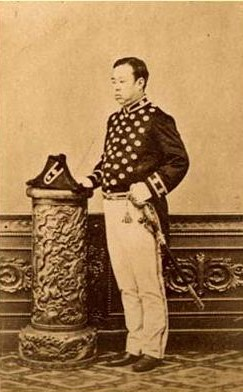
Hosokawa Morihisa, final daimyo of Kumamoto Domain

== History ==
During the Sengoku period, the Kikuchi, Aso clan, and Sagara clans emerged as powerful daimyo, each establishing their bases in the north, central, and southern regions respectively. This led to a relatively peaceful period within the Sengoku era. However, tensions arose when the Aso clan launched an attack on the Kikuchi clan. Despite their victory, the Aso clan faced their own internal conflicts and succession disputes among their relatives. As a result, the Otomo clan from Bungo Province intervened and pacified the former Kikuchi territory. The Aso clan also came under the influence of the Otomo clan, further solidifying their control over the region. Following the introduction of firearms, the Sagara clan, known for their defensive prowess in Kagoshima and Shimazu, ultimately submitted to the Shimazu clan. Under the rule of the Shimazu clan, they willingly gave up their role as a powerful defense force in the southern region and instead adopted advanced weapons and tactics. This strategic shift allowed them to adapt to the changing times and align themselves with the Shimazu's vision for progress. In a similar vein, the Aso clan experienced a comparable destiny as they were methodically dismantled by the Shimazu army during their conquest of Kyushu. This marked a significant turning point for both clans, as they had to navigate the challenges of relinquishing their traditional roles and embracing new strategies for survival and prosperity. The Shimazu clan, on the brink of conquering Kyushu, faced a crushing defeat at the hands of the formidable army led by Toyotomi Hideyoshi. Hideyoshi responded to the pleas of Oita and Otomo, mustering a massive force that ultimately subdued Kyushu, including the region of Higo which was abandoned by the Shimazu clan. Following the defeat of the Shimazu clan, Kato Kiyomasa, the ruler of Kumamoto Castle, emerged as a prominent figure in the northern part of Higo Province. With a substantial holding of 250,000 koku, Kiyomasa's military prowess in the Battle of Sekigahara earned him the former territory of Konishi Yukinaga, Additionally, he expanded his domain by acquiring 20,000 koku from areas like Tsurusaki Province in Bungo Province. As a result of his military achievements and territorial acquisitions, Kato Kiyomasa solidified his power and influence in the region. The Kumamoto Domain was officially established, boasting a total holding of 520,000 koku under Kiyomasa's rule. This marked a significant shift in the balance of power in Kyushu during that period.

Kumamoto Castle, built by Kato Kiyomasa, is one of Japan's famous castles. He not only oversaw its construction but also played a key role in developing castle towns and road networks. Kiyomasa also improved agriculture with new fields and irrigation systems. Today, Kumamoto residents still admire his civil engineering projects for their role in the region's prosperity. Recent studies on Kato Kiyomasa reveal his creation of a mobilization and tax system during military expeditions to Korea. This system, which appointed senior vassals as branch lords and gave power to peasants, continued even after the Battle of Sekigahara. However, issues like rural village depletion and power struggles among vassals have led to criticism of Kiyomasa's rule.

The Kato clan suffered a setback in 1632 when their leader lost his fief for his involvement in the Suruga Dainagon Incident. He was banished to Shonai, isolating the clan. In 1870, Hosokawa Morihisa transformed into a Chihanji and joined the kzoku, leading the Jitsugaku Party. He requested to dismantle Kumamoto Castle, but dissenting voices halted the demolition. Kumamoto Prefecture was established in 1871 after feudal domains were abolished. The Hosokawa clan became marquis in 1884. In 1983, Hosokawa Morihiro, later the 79th Prime Minister, became governor of Kumamoto Prefecture before retiring to pursue ceramics.

== Kumamotoshinden Domain ==
Kumamotoshinden Domain (肥後新田藩), also known as the Kumamotoshinden domain, was a branch domain of the larger Kumamoto Domain. It was established in 1666 by Toshige, the younger brother of Hosokawa Tsunatoshi, the third lord of the Kumamoto Domain. Toshige received 35,000 koku of rice from the Kumamoto domain's rice store and set up his own domain. Unlike other feudal lords, Toshige resided in Teppozu, Edo and did not practice sankin kotai, the system of alternate attendance. However, with the advent of the Meiji Restoration in 1868, a provisional domain office was established at the Takase Town Magistrate's Office in Tamana City. Consequently, the domain's name was changed to Takase Domain. In 1870, a formal jinya, or administrative center, was completed and relocated to Iwasaki Village in Tamana District. In the same year, the domain was merged with the Kumamoto domain and ultimately abolished.

== Holdings at the end of the Edo period ==
- Higo Province
  - Akata-gun – 177 villages
  - Takoma-gun – 59 villages
  - Kamimashiki-gun – 201 villages
  - Shimomashiki-gun – 191 villages
  - Uto-gun – 64 villages
  - Ashikita-gun – 204 villages
  - Tamana-gun – 257 villages
  - Yamamoto County – 62 villages
  - Kikuchi-gun – 81 villages
  - Koshi-gun – 104 villages
  - Yamaga-gun – 67 villages
  - Aso-gun – 214 villages
  - Yatsushiro County – 91 villages
- Bungo Province
  - Oita County – 39 villages (72 villages)
  - Kaifu County – 22 villages (39 villages)
  - Naoiri County – 2 villages (6 villages)

== List of daimyōs ==
#	Name	Tenure	Courtesy title	Court Rank	kokudaka
Katō clan, 1588–1632 (Tozama daimyo)
1	Kato Kiyomasa (加藤清正)	1600–1611	Higo no kami (肥後守)	Junior 5th Rank, Upper Grade (従五位下)	520,000 koku
2	Kato Tadahiro (加藤忠弘)	1611–1632	Higo no kami (肥後守)	Junior 5th Rank, Lower Grade (従五位下)	520,000 koku
Hosokawa clan, 1632–1871 (Tozama daimyo)
1	Hosokawa Tadatoshi (細川忠俊)	1632–1641	Shasosho (社叢書)	Junior 4th Rank, Lower Grade (従五位下)	540,000 koku
2	Hosokawa Mitsunao (細川満直)	1641–1649	Higo no kami (肥後守)	Junior 4th Rank, Lower Grade (従五位下)	540,000 koku
3	Hosokawa Tsunatoshi (細川綱俊)	1649–1712	Ecchu no kami (越中守)	Junior 4th Rank, Lower Grade (従五位下)	540,000 koku
4	Hosokawa Nobunori (細川信則)	1712–1732	Etchu no kami (越中守)	Junior 5th Rank, Lower Grade (従五位下)	540,000 koku
5	Hosokawa Munetaka (細川宗隆)	1732–1747	Etchu no kami (越中守)	Junior 5th Rank, Lower Grade (従五位下)	540,000 koku
6	Hosokawa Shigekata (1718–1785) (細川重方)	1747–1785	Ecchu no kami(越中守)	Junior 5th Rank, Lower Grade (従五位下)	540,000 koku
7	Hosokawa Harutoshi (細川晴敏)	1785–1787	Etchu no kami (越中守)	Junior 4th Rank, Lower Grade (従五位下)	540,000 koku
8	Hosokawa Narishige (細川成成)	1787–1810	Ecchu no kami (越中守)	Junior 4th Rank, Lower Grade (従五位下)	540,000 koku
9	Hosokawa Naritatsu (細川成田津)	1810–1826	Ecchu no kami (越中守)	Junior 4th Rank, Lower Grade (従五位下)	540,000 koku
10	Hosokawa Narimori (細川斉盛)	1826–1860	Ecchu no kami (越中守)	Junior 4th Rank, Lower Grade (従五位下)	540,000 koku
11	Hosokawa Yoshikuni (細川義国)	1860–1870	Etchu no kami (越中守)	Junior 4th Rank, Lower Grade (従五位下)	540,000 koku
12	Hosokawa Morihisa (細川盛久)	1870–1871	None (全然)	Junior 4th Rank, Lower Grade (従五位下)	540,000 koku

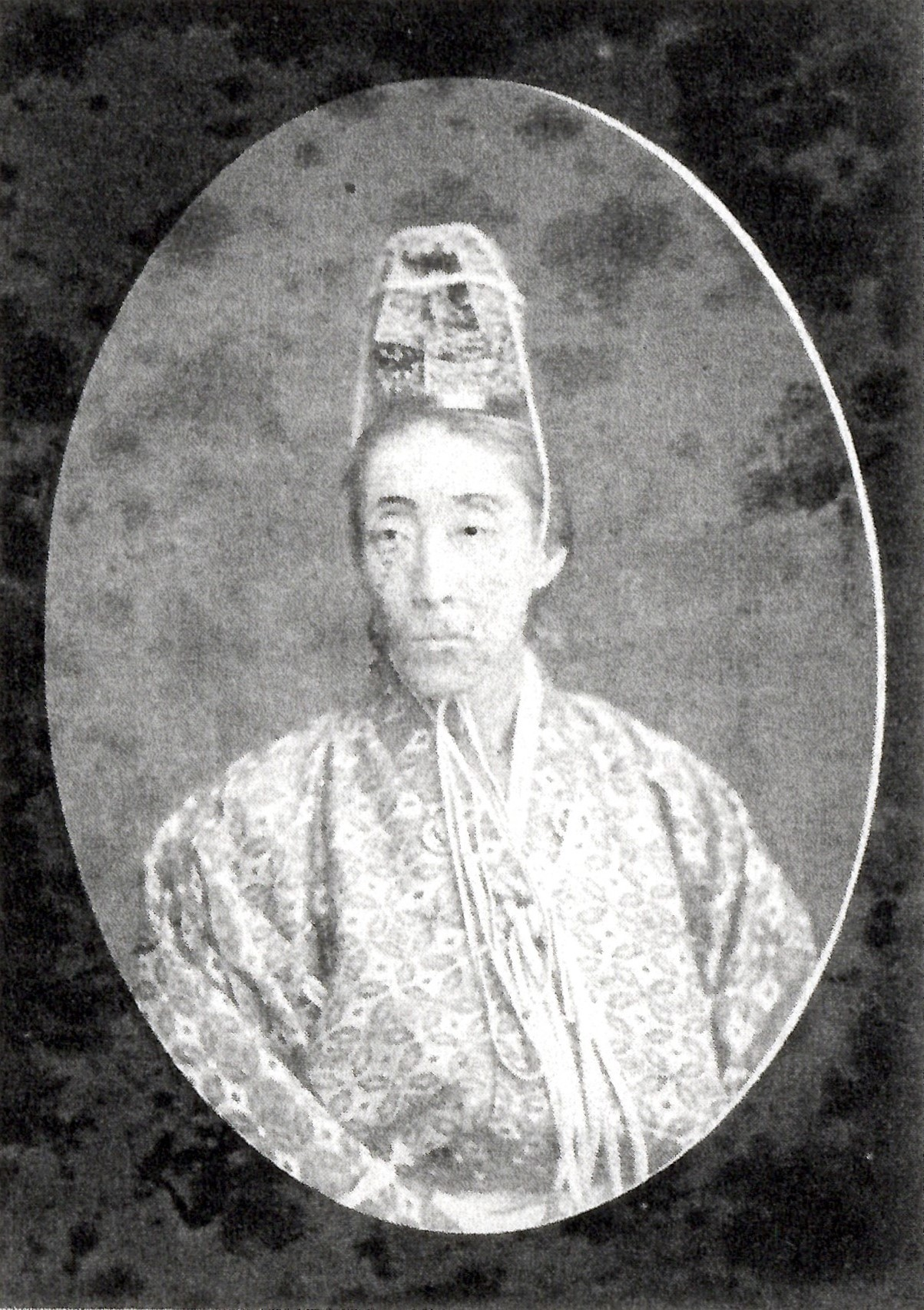
Hosokawa Toshinaga, final daimyo of Kumamotoshinden Domain

Kumamotoshinden Domain

#	Name	Tenure	Courtesy title	Court Rank	kokudaka
Hosokawa clan, 1666–1870 (fudai daimyo)
1	Hosokawa Toshishige (細川利重)	1666–1687	Wakasa no kami (若さの髪)	Junior 5th Rank, Lower Grade (従五位下)	35,000 koku
2	Hosokawa Toshimasa (細川利昌)	1687–1715	None (なし)	Junior 5th Rank, Lower Grade (従五位下)	35,000 koku
3	Hosokawa Toshiyasu (細川利恭)	1715–1742	Bingo no kami (ビンゴの髪	Junior 5th Rank, Lower Grade (従五位下)	35,000 koku
4	Hosokawa Toshihiro (細川利寛)	1742–1767	Wakasa no kami (若さの髪)	Junior 5th Rank, Lower Grade (従五位下)	35,000 koku
5	Hosokawa Toshiyuki (細川利致)	1767–1781	Wakasa no kami (若さの髪)	Junior 5th Rank, Lower Grade (従五位下)	35,000 koku
6	Hosokawa Toshitsune (細川利庸)	1781–1805	Noto no kami (のとの髪)	Junior 5th Rank, Lower Grade (従五位下)	35,000 koku
7	Hosokawa Toshikuni (細川利国)	1805–1810	None (なし)	Junior 5th Rank, Lower Grade (従五位下)	35,000 koku
8	Hosokawa Toshika (細川利愛)	1810–1833	None (なし)	Junior 5th Rank, Lower Grade (従五位下)	35,000 koku
9	Hosokawa Toshimochi (細川利用)	1833–1856	Noto no kami (のとの髪)	Junior 5th Rank, Lower Grade (従五位下)	35,000 koku
10	Hosokawa Toshinaga (細川利永)	1856–1870	Wakasa no kami (若さの髪)	Junior 5th Rank, Lower Grade (従五位下)	35,000 koku

=== Genealogy ===
- Hosokawa Fujitaka (1534–1610)
  - Tadaoki (1563–1645)
    - I. Tadatoshi, 1st daimyō of Kumamoto (cr. 1632) (1586–1641; r. 1632–1641)
      - II. Mitsunao, 2nd daimyō of Kumamoto (1619–1650; r. 1641–1650)
        - III. Tsunatoshi, 3rd daimyō of Kumamoto (1641–1712; r. 1650–1712)
        - Toshishige (1646–1687)
          - IV. Nobunori, 4th daimyō of Kumamoto (1676–1732; r. 1712–1732)
            - V. Munetaka, 5th daimyō of Kumamoto (1716–1747; r. 1732–1747)
            - VI. Shigekata, 6th daimyō of Kumamoto (1721–1785; r. 1747–1785)
              - VII. Harutoshi, 7th daimyō of Kumamoto (1758–1787; r. 1785–1787)
    - Tatsutaka (1615–1645)
      - Yukitaka, 1st daimyō of Udo (1637–1690)
        - Aritaka, 2nd daimyō of Udo (1676–1733)
          - Okinari, 3rd daimyō of Udo (1699–1737)
            - Okinori, 5th daimyō of Udo (1723–1785)
              - VIII. Narishige, 6th daimyō of Udo, 8th daimyō of Kumamoto (1755–1835; r. 1787–1810)
                - Tatsuyuki, 7th daimyō of Udo (1784–1818)
                  - X. Narimori, 8th daimyō of Udo, 10th Lord of Kumamoto (1804–1860; r. 1826–1860)
                    - XI.Yoshikuni, 11th daimyō of Kumamoto, 25th Hosokawa family head (1835–1876; r. 1860–1869. Governor of Kumamoto 1869–1871).
                    - Morihisa, 26th Hosokawa family head, 1st Marquess (1839–1893; family head 1876–1893; 1st Marquess Hosokawa: 1884–1893)
                      - Morishige, 27th Hosokawa family head, 2nd Marquess (1868–1914; family head and 2nd Marquess 1893–1914)
                      - Morikei, 1st Baron Hosokawa (cr. 1896) (1882–1898)
                      - Moritatsu, 28th Hosokawa family head, 3rd Marquess, 2nd Baron (1883–1970; 2nd Baron Hosokawa 1898, 14th Hosokawa family head 1914–1970, 3rd Marquess 1914–1947)
                        - Morisada, 29th Hosokawa family head (1912–2005; family head 1970–2005)
                          - Morihiro, 30th Hosokawa family head (b. 1938; family head 2005–). Prime Minister of Japan 1993–1994
                            - Morimitsu (b. 1972)
                - IX. Naritatsu, 9th daimyō of Kumamoto (1788–1826; r. 1810–1826)

== See also ==
- Abolition of the han system
- List of Han
