= Katō Tadahiro =

Japanese daimyō (c.1601–1653)

- 加藤 忠広
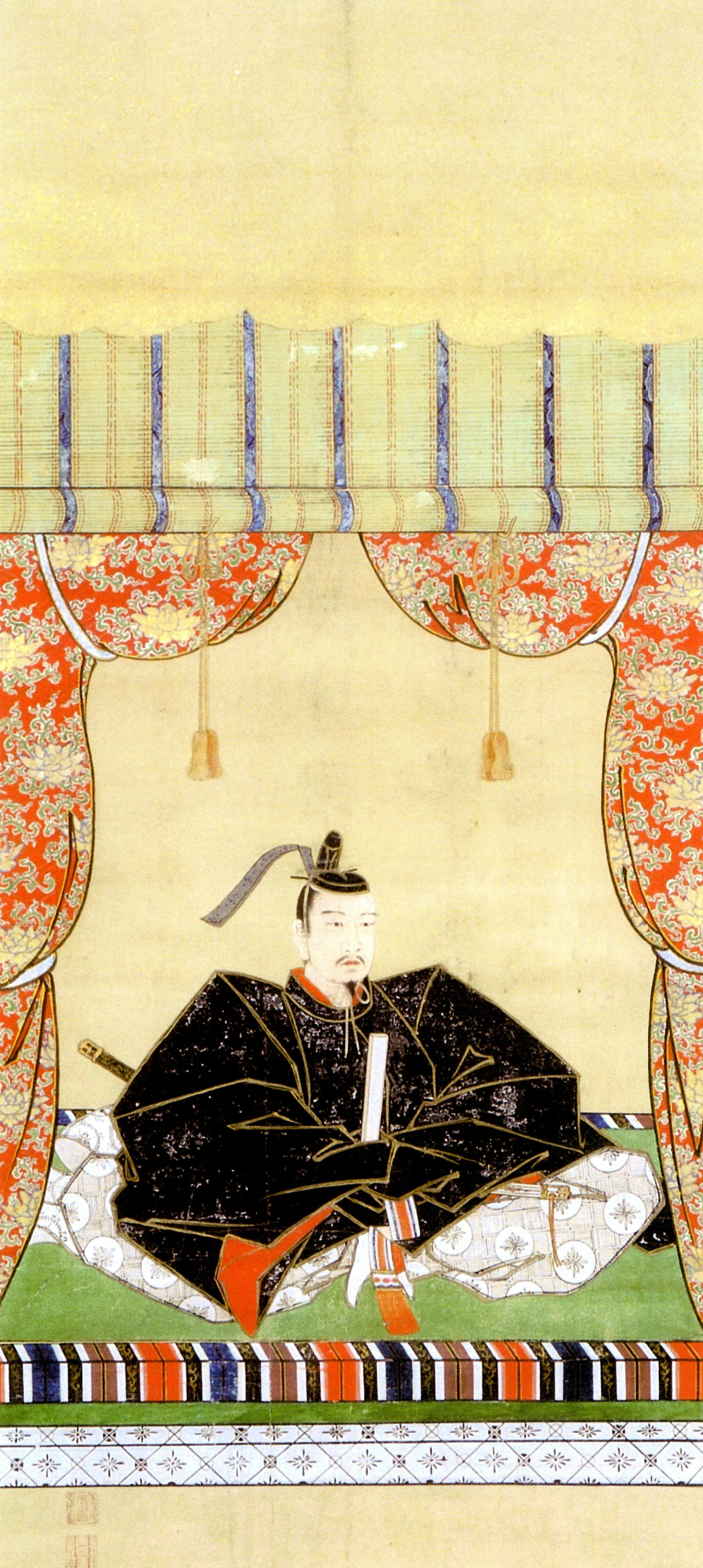
- The sculpture of Katō Tadahiro, part of the collection at Honmyoji Temple

Lord of Kumamoto
- In office 1611–1632
- Preceded by: Katō Kiyomasa
- Succeeded by: Hosokawa Tadatoshi

Personal details
- Born: 1601?
- Died: August 8, 1653 Hōjūjidono (present-day Tsuruoka City, Yamagata Prefecture)

Katō Tadahiro (Chinese: 加藤 忠広), 1601? - August 8, 1653 was a prominent daimyō of the early Edo period in Japan, belonging to the influential Katō clan. Born into a family of samurai lineage, Tadahiro inherited his position as the head of the Katō clan from his father, Katō Kiyomasa, a renowned military commander.

== History ==
As a daimyo, Tadahiro played a significant role in the governance and administration of his domain, which was primarily located in the Kumamoto Domain on the island of Kyushu. He oversaw matters of governance, taxation, and defense, maintaining a retinue of samurai warriors to ensure the stability and prosperity of his territory.

Tadahiro lived during a period of significant political change in Japan, as the Tokugawa shogunate consolidated power and implemented policies to centralize control over the domains. His life and actions were influenced by the shifting political landscape of the early Edo period, and he navigated challenges associated with maintaining loyalty to the shogunate while preserving the autonomy of his domain.

While specific details about Tadahiro's life story may vary depending on historical sources, his legacy as a daimyō within the Katō clan remains a testament to the complexities of feudal Japan during the early Edo period. As a daimyo, Tadahiro played a significant role in the governance and administration of his domain, which was primarily located in the Kumamoto Domain on the island of Kyushu. He oversaw matters of governance, taxation, and defense, maintaining a retinue of samurai warriors to ensure the stability and prosperity of his territory.

== Death ==
Tadahiro lived during a period of significant political change in Japan, as the Tokugawa shogunate consolidated power and implemented policies to centralize control over the domains. His life and actions were influenced by the shifting political landscape of the early Edo period, and he navigated challenges associated with maintaining loyalty to the shogunate while preserving the autonomy of his domain. Katō Tadahiro (加藤 忠広) was exiled from Japan after being accused of treason, following the death of his father, Katō Kiyomasa. Treason was considered a grave offense during the feudal period in Japan, and individuals found guilty of such crimes faced severe punishment, including exile.

The circumstances surrounding Tadahiro’s alleged treason and subsequent exile are not extensively documented in historical records. However, it is believed that political intrigue, power struggles, or conflicts within the Katō may have played a role in his downfall.

== Family ==
Katō Tadahiro is the son of Katō Kiyomasa and his spouse was Yorihime, with whom he had three sons: Katō Naomasa, Katō Tadatsugu and Katō Naotsugu.

== Legacy ==
Katō Tadahiro, a prominent daimyo of early Edo Japan, left a lasting impact on Japanese history. Known for his military leadership, diplomatic finesse, and cultural patronage, Tadahiro's legacy extends beyond his lifetime.

His strategic brilliance on the battlefield and adept navigation of political complexities strengthened the Katō clan's position. Tadahiro's support for the arts enriched cultural life in his domain, fostering a vibrant cultural scene. Moreover, his family members, including his sons, continued his legacy, contributing to the clan's governance and societal advancements.

== See also ==
• Katō Yoshiaki

• Katō Kiyomasa
