= Siege of Iwatsurugi Castle =

1554 Siege on Kyushu during the Sengoku Period of Japan

Coordinates: 31.709°N 130.622°E

- Part of Sengoku period
Date	1554
Location	Iwatsurugi Castle, Kyushu
Result	Shimazu victory

Belligerents
Shimazu clan	Kedōin clan

Commanders and leaders
Shimazu Yoshihiro; Shimazu Yoshihisa; Shimazu Toshihisa; Ijuin Tadaaki	Kedōin Yoshishige

The siege of Iwatsurugi Castle was fought in 1554 near Kagoshima Bay at the southern end of the island of Kyushu, Japan. The siege was just one of a number of military actions that Shimazu Takahisa had to take against his rebellious kokujin vassals.

Iwatsurugi Castle was a castle near the coast of Kagoshima Bay, in the vicinity of modern-day Shigetomi Beach, in what is now Aira, Kagoshima. During the siege, Ijuin Tadaaki, one of the Shimazu generals, maneuvered five ships to within range and proceeded with an offshore bombardment of the enemy garrison, a few of whom were killed. The siege lasted a few weeks until the castle fell.
