= Honmyō-ji =

Buddhist temple in Kumamoto, Japan

Coordinates: 32°49′01″N 130°41′22″E

Honmyōji 本妙寺
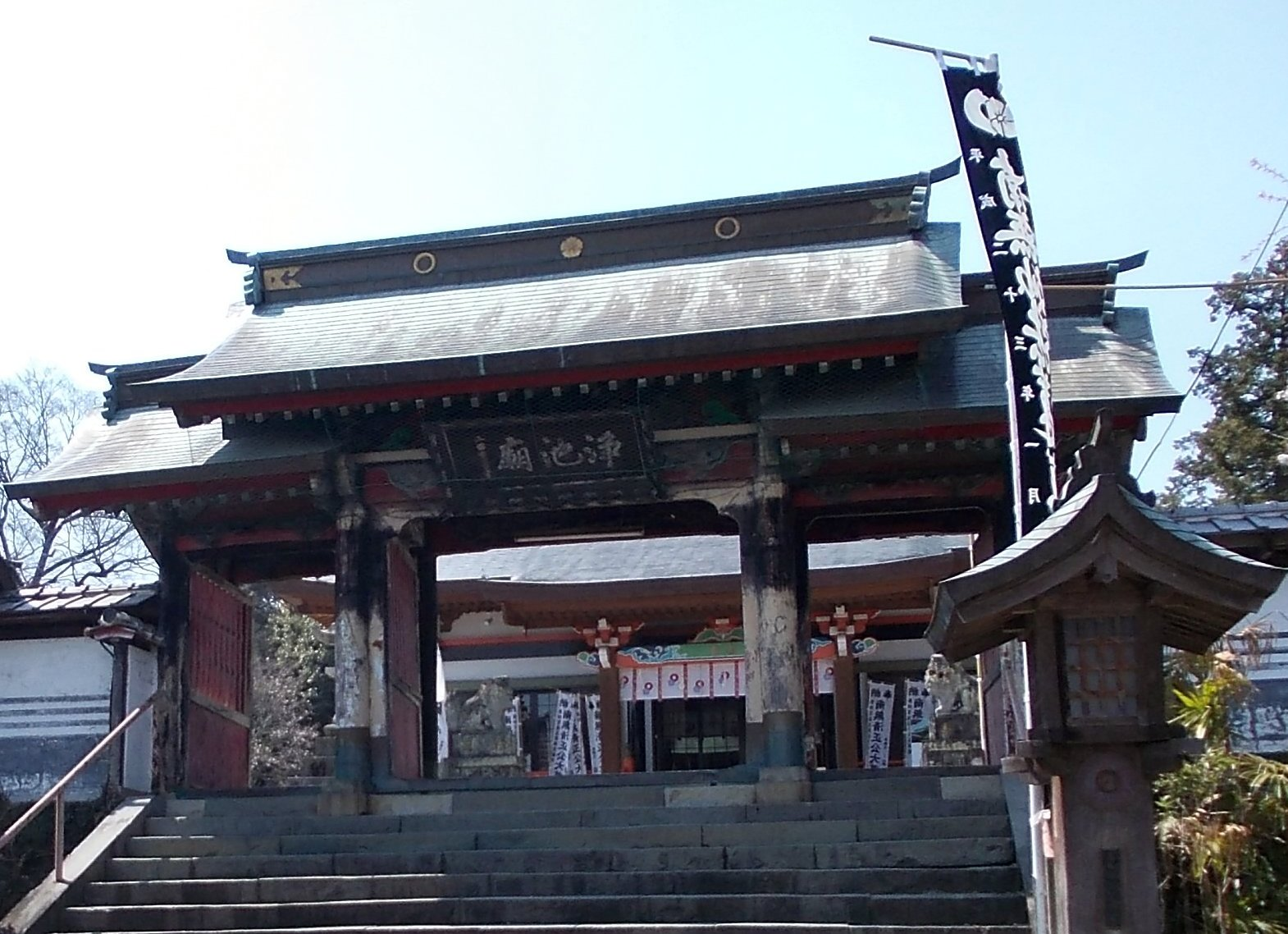

Religion
- Affiliation: Nichiren Buddhism, Rokujōmonryū

Location
- Location: 4-13-1, Hanazono, Nishi-ku, Kumamoto, 860-0072
- Country: Japan
- Interactive map of Honmyōji 本妙寺

Architecture
- Founder: Katō Kiyomasa, Nisshin (日真) (present temple)
- Completed: 1614

Website
- http://www.honmyouji.jp/

Honmyō-ji (本妙寺) is a Buddhist temple of the Nichiren sect, Rokujōmon-ryū (六条門流), in Nishi-ku, Kumamoto, Japan. It is the most high-ranking temple of the sect in Kyushu. In Honmyō-ji is the grave of Katō Kiyomasa, (1562–1611), a Japanese daimyō, builder of Kumamoto Castle and a dedicated buddhist of Nichiren Buddhism.

== The temple ==
Honmyō-ji consists of two parts, the grave of Katō Kiyomasa which is called Jōchibyō, and Honmyō-ji temple. He was a dedicated believer of Nichiren Buddhism. There is a straight road beginning at Kamikumamoto, through a big torii, dotted with 12 smaller temples called tatchū, leading to the Honmyō-ji temple. From the temple, a steep slope consisting of 176 stone steps called Munatsuki Gangi begins, which leads to the grave. On the central part of the road are many stone lantern structures, contributed by believers. People pray before the altar of the grave of Katō Kiyomasa. There is a museum housing various traditional items of historical importance. There is a big statue of Katō Kiyomasa, 300 steps upwards.

== Tonsha-e ==
On July 23, one day before the death day of Katō Kiyomasa, a festival is observed which is called Tonsha-e. It is observed to console the spirit of Katō Kiyomasa, by writing the long Lotus Sutra during one night by many priests.

== History ==
The original temple was built in 1585 in Osaka to console the spirit of the father of Katō Kiyomasa. The temple in Osaka was moved to Kumamoto Castle in 1600 and the grave of Katō Kiyomasa, which is called Jōchibyō was built in the present site of Mount Nakao in 1611. The temple in Kumamoto Castle was burned and moved to the present site considerably under the grave of Katō Kiyomasa in 1614. In 1871, the Shinto shrine part grave was moved to Kumamoto Castle in the name of Katō Shrine under the policy of the separation of Shintoism and Buddhism. During the Satsuma Rebellion of 1877, the temple was partly burnt. Later the temple and the grave were reconstructed. Throughout the Edo period and Meiji period, the temple attracted many people from Kumamoto for recreation.

Ever since the Edo period or Meiji period, leprosy patients had gathered around the temple, so they could live, begging for money from many people coming to the temple.

Around 1930, there occurred the "No Leprosy Patients in Our Prefecture" movement and the Government intended to hospitalize all leprosy patients in sanatoriums. On July 9, 1940, 157 leprosy patients living around Honmyō-ji temple were forcibly hospitalized in many sanatoriums throughout the country.
