= Kikusui =

Kikusui may refer to:

- Kikusui, Kumamoto, a former town in Japan
- Operation Kikusui ("Floating Chrysanthemum"), a series of ten large kamikaze suicide raids carried out by Imperial Japanese Navy and Imperial Japanese Army aircraft against Allied ships off Okinawa in 1945
- Kikusui Station, a Sapporo Municipal Subway station in Shiroishi-ku, Sapporo, Hokkaido, Japan
- Kikusui Electronics Corporation of Kanagawa Japan, "...a specialist manufacturer of electronic measurement instruments and power supply equipment,...".
