= Yusaku Iriki =

Japanese baseball player

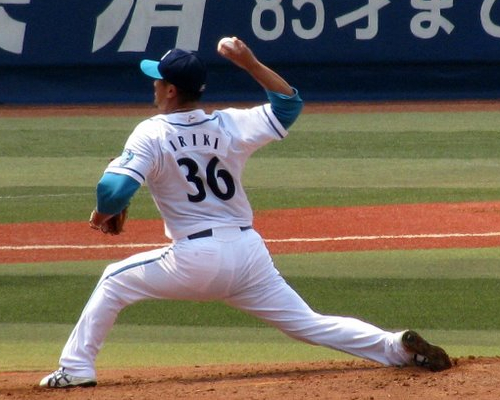
- Iriki pitching for the Shonan Searex, Yokohama BayStars' farm team, in 2008

Yokohama DeNA BayStars – No. 88
- Starting pitcher / Coach
- Born: August 8, 1972 (age 52); Miyakonojō, Miyazaki, Japan
- Batted: Right Threw: Right

debut
- April 8, 1997, for the Yomiuri Giants

Last appearance
- April 2, 2008, for the Yokohama BayStars

Career statistics
- Win–loss record: 35–35
- Earned run average: 3.77
- Strikeouts: 674

Teams
- As player: Yomiuri Giants (1997–2002); Hokkaido Nippon-Ham Fighters (2004–2005); Yokohama BayStars (2008); As coach: Fukuoka SoftBank Hawks (2015–2019); Orix Buffaloes (2021-2023); Yokohama DeNA BayStars (2024-present)

Career highlights and awards
- 1× NPB All-Star (2001)

Yusaku Iriki (入来 祐作, Iriki Yūsaku; born August 8, 1972 in Miyakonojō, Miyazaki, Japan) is a Japanese former baseball pitcher.

His elder brother Satoshi was also a former professional baseball player.

== Biography ==
Iriki attended the Perfect Liberty High School and Asia University (Japan) before joining the Honda amateur baseball team. He was drafted by the Yomiuri Giants in 1996. In 1999, his older brother, Satoshi, was traded to the Giants from the Kintetsu Buffaloes, and the two were teammates from 1999 to 2000. In 2001, he led the team in wins (13), and appeared in the all-star game for the first time. His brother had also made it to the all-star game, pitching for the Yakult Swallows, and the Iriki brothers made back to back appearances in the all-star game. This was the first all-star sibling relay in Japanese baseball history.

In the 2003 off-season, Iriki was traded to the Hokkaido Nippon-Ham Fighters, and caused some controversy by trying to make the team ensure that he would be released to play in the major leagues in two years. Iriki got his wish in 2006, signing a major league contract with the New York Mets. He did not make it onto the major league roster, and was given a minor league contract in April of the same year. On April 28, 2006, Iriki was suspended for 50 games for violating Major League Baseball's policy against performance-enhancing drug use. The suspension originated from testing during the Mets' spring training camp.

Iriki was dropped by the Mets at the end of 2006, and spent the 2007 season in the Toronto Blue Jays minor league system. He returned to the Japanese leagues in 2008, signing with the Yokohama BayStars. After the season, he announced his retirement from professional baseball.
