= Satoshi Iriki =

Japanese baseball player (1967–2023)

- Pitcher
- Born: 3 June 1967; Miyakonojō, Miyazaki, Japan
- Died: 10 February 2023 (aged 55)
- Batted: Right Threw: Right

Professional debut
- NPB: 18 April, 1990, for the Kintetsu Buffaloes
- KBO: 2003, for the Doosan Bears
- CPBL: 28 March, 2004, for the La New Bears

Last appearance
- 20 June, 2004, for the La New Bears

NPB statistics (through 2002)
- Win–loss record: 35–30
- Earned run average: 4.25
- Strikeouts: 422
- Saves: 2

KBO statistics (through 2003)
- Win–loss record: 7–11
- Earned run average: 3.74
- Strikeouts: 87
- Saves: 5

CPBL statistics (through 2004)
- Win–loss record: 4–6
- Earned run average: 3.39
- Strikeouts: 59
- Saves: 0
- Stats at Baseball Reference

Teams
- As player: Kintetsu Buffaloes (1990–1996, 1997–1998); Hiroshima Toyo Carp (1996); Yomiuri Giants (1999–2000); Yakult Swallows (2001–2002); Doosan Bears (2003); La New Bears (2004)

Career highlights and awards
- 1× NPB All-Star (2001)

Satoshi Iriki (入來 智, Iriki Satoshi; 3 June 1967 — 10 February 2023) was a Japanese baseball player for the Japanese Professional Baseball league. He played in the Japan Pacific League and the Korea Baseball Organization.

== Personal life ==
His brother Yusaku is also a former baseball player.

Iriki was born on 3 June 1967.

== Death ==
Iriki died in a traffic collision on 10 February 2023. He was involved in a frontal collision while driving his personal vehicle near his hometown. Iriki was rushed to the hospital where he died 2 hours later. Death was attributed to massive head injuries. He was 55 years old.
