= Tanegashima clan =

Japanese aristocratic family

Tanegashima clan 種子島氏
- The emblem (mon) of the Tanegashima clan
- Home province: Tanegashima Island
- Parent house: Higo clan
- Titles: Baron
- Current head: Tanegashima Tokikuni
- Founding year: 14th century
- Dissolution: still extant
- Ruled until: 1868 (Abolition of the han system)

The Tanegashima clan (種子島氏, Tanegashima-shi) is a Japanese aristocratic family of samurai origins that originated on the Tanegashima Island, just south of Kyūshū. From the late Sengoku era to the start of the Meiji era, the Tanegashima were retainers of the Shimazu clan of the Satsuma Domain. In 1900, they were appointed Baron.

== Origin ==
The Tanegashima clan claims Taira ancestry. According to the family genealogy, its founder Nobumoto (信基) was a great-grandson of Taira no Kiyomori. Surviving the Genpei War (1180–1185), he was adopted by Hōjō Tokimasa, changed his name to Tokinobu (時信) and was given the island of Tanegashima at the beginning of the Kamakura period. However, this story is considered unhistorical because no contemporary source supports it.

The actual origin of the Tanegashima clan was the Higo clan. In 1203, Hōjō Tomotoki, the founder of the Nagoe branch of the Hōjō clan, was appointed as a jitō or land steward of the estate of Shimazu, which covered Tanegashima Island. Since the Nagoe family resided in Kamakura, the Higo clan was sent to the estate to rule it on behalf of the Nagoe family. Some members of the Higo clan seem to have spread to Tanegashima. The Higo clan made itself autonomous in Tanegashima after the Hōjō clan was annihilated. During the Nanboku-chō period, it began to claim the clan name of Tanegashima, which implied the ownership of the island.

== Semi-autonomy ==
During the Nanboku-chō period, the Tanegashima clan began to contact with the Shimazu clan, who had gained the position of the shugo or governor of Satsuma, Ōsumi and Hyūga Provinces. Shimazu long suffered from internal struggles and faced resistance from local rulers. The Tanegashima clan enjoyed a high degree of autonomy until Shimazu unified southern Kyūshū in the late 16th century.

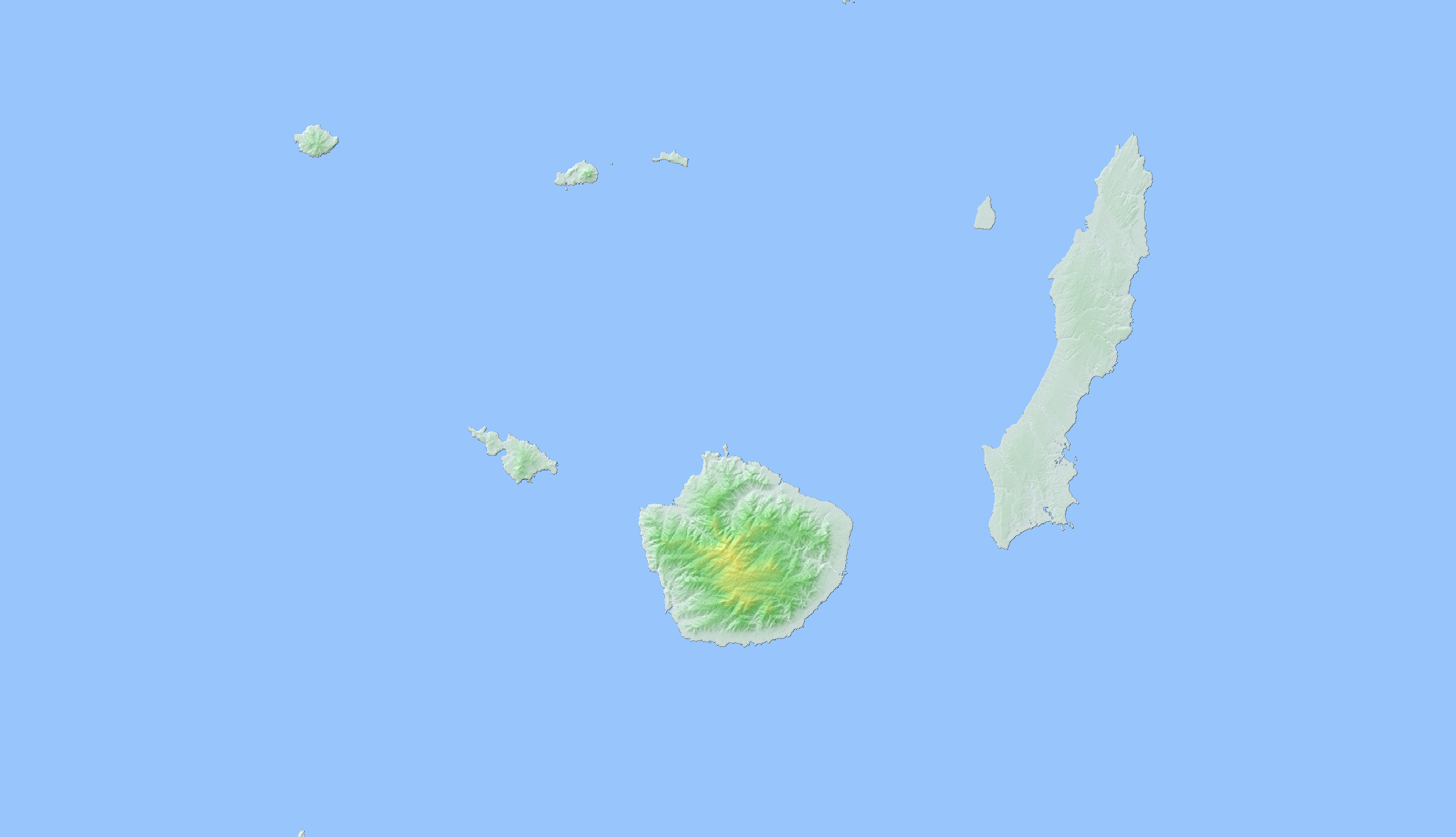
Tanegashima (right), Yakushima (center), Kuchierabu (center left) and the Upper Three Islands (upper left).

Shimazu ceded control of various southern islands to Tanegashima. In 1409, Higo (Tanegashima) Kiyotoki was given the islands of Yaku and Kuchierabu by Shimazu Motohisa, the head of the Ōshū branch of the Shimazu clan, who rivaled the Sōshū branch family. In 1424, however, Tanegashima was forced to give Kuchierabu back to the Ōshū family although it regained the island three years later. In the 1420s, the Ōshū family gave the Upper Three Islands (Kuroshima, Iōjima and Takeshima) to the Tanegashima clan. Around 1430, however, they were recaptured by Shimazu. In 1436, Shimazu Mochihisa, the head of Sasshū, another branch family, gave Kiyotoki's son Hatatoki two of the Seven Islands, which are identified as Gaja and Taira Islands.

The Tanegashima clan established firm control over Yakushima, which was known for forestry. In 1524 Tanegashima Tadatoki built two fortresses on Yakushima. In 1543, Tadatoki's son Shigetoki was attacked by Nejime Shigetake, a ruler of Ōsumi Province, and fled to Tanegashima. Shigetoki handed over Yakushima to Nejime but restored it by force the following near. Tanegashima continued to battle against Nejime until 1572.

== Trade ==
Tanegashima Tokiuji, Tadatoki's father, established a channel of communication to Kinai (central Japan). In the 1460s the population of Tanegashima, Yakushima and Kuchierabu converted en masse to the Hokke sect of Nichiren Buddhism. This established a firm link to Honnō-ji of Kyoto and Honkōji of Settsu Province, the sect's strongholds. Historical sources show that gifts dedicated to Honnō-ji by Tanegashima Tokiuji included Chinese and South Asian products such as silk fabric and pepper. In addition to Buddhist monks, craftsmen were moved from Kinai to Tanegashima. The heads of the Tanegashima clan personally visited Kinai and developed a network of contacts. Using this network, Tanegashima Shigetoki served as an intermediary between the imperial court and the Sōshū branch of the Shimazu clan, who later re-unified the Shimazu clan.

Tanegashima Island functioned as a relay station of one of the main routes of Chinese trade that connected Sakai to Ningbo. The Tanegashima clan cooperated with the Hosokawa clan, one of two powers who controlled Chinese trade. Tanegashima also engaged in trade with Okinawa-centered kingdom of Ryūkyū, which is attested by some letters given to Tanegashima by Ryūkyū in the 16th century. It is known that Japanese trade ships to Ming China exported Southeast Asian products such as pepper and sappanwood. They were probably obtained by the Tanegashima clan via Ryūkyū. Historians draw attention to a letter given to Ryūkyū by the Ōuchi clan in 1542, which requested Ryūkyū to detain Tanegashima's ships. The Ōuchi clan, who rivaled the Hosokawa clan in Chinese trade, seems to have intended to bar Hosokawa from trade.

Tanegashima is traditionally known as the site of the introduction of European firearms to Japan although this account is frequently questioned by historians. It is said that firearms were introduced in 1543 by the Portuguese who drifted to Tanegashima. The Tanegashima clan, led by its 15 year old daimyō Tanegashima Tokitaka, quickly acquired the methods of producing firearms and gunpowder. Due to Tanegashima's role in the spread of firearms, firearms were colloquially known as "Tanegashima" in Japan.

== Vassalage to Shimazu ==
Although Tanegashima had long enjoyed semi-autonomy, the newly unified Shimazu clan gradually tightened control over the clan. In 1582, Tanegashima's trade with Ryūkyū was put under control of Shimazu. Shimazu also forbade Tanegashima from selling lumber to the rulers of Kyūshū except Shimazu.

After subjugating Shimazu, Toyotomi Hideyoshi finalized Tanegashima's vassalage to Shimazu. In 1595, the Tanegashima clan was moved from its medieval homeland to Chiran, Satsuma Province. Although Tanegashima was given back to the Tanegashima clan in 1599, the islands of Yaku and Kuchierabu remained under Shimazu's direct rule. In 1598, Tanegashima Hisatoki was appointed as karō or top-ranking official. This family rank was maintained throughout the Edo period. When Hisatoki died in 1612 leaving his successor in the mother's womb, Shimazu intervened in Tanegashima's governance, making it a dutiful subject.

The 24th head Hisamichi (久道) died in 1829 without male issue. His widow Shōjuin, who was a daughter of Shimazu Narinobu and a sister of Shimazu Narioki, administered Tanegashima for 15 years. In 1842 Tanegashima finally adopted Hisamichi (久珍) from the Shimazu clan.

The 27th head Moritoki was made a baron in 1900. As of 2012, Tanegashima Tokikuni served as the 29th head of the clan.
