= Shimazu Katsuhisa =

Head of the Shimazu clan (1503–1573)

- 島津 勝久

Head of Shimazu clan
- In office 1519–1527
- Preceded by: Shimazu Tadataka
- Succeeded by: Shimazu Takahisa

Personal details
- Born: September 8, 1503
- Died: November 9, 1573 (aged 70)
- Parent: Shimazu Tadamasa (father)

Military service
- Battles/wars: Battle of Ichiki Tsurumaru Castle

Shimazu Katsuhisa (島津 勝久; September 8, 1503 – November 9, 1573) was head of the Shimazu clan in Japan. He was adopted father of Shimazu Takahisa (son of Shimazu Tadayoshi).
