= Shimazu Takahisa =

Daimyo and fifteenth head of the Shimazu clan

- 島津貴久
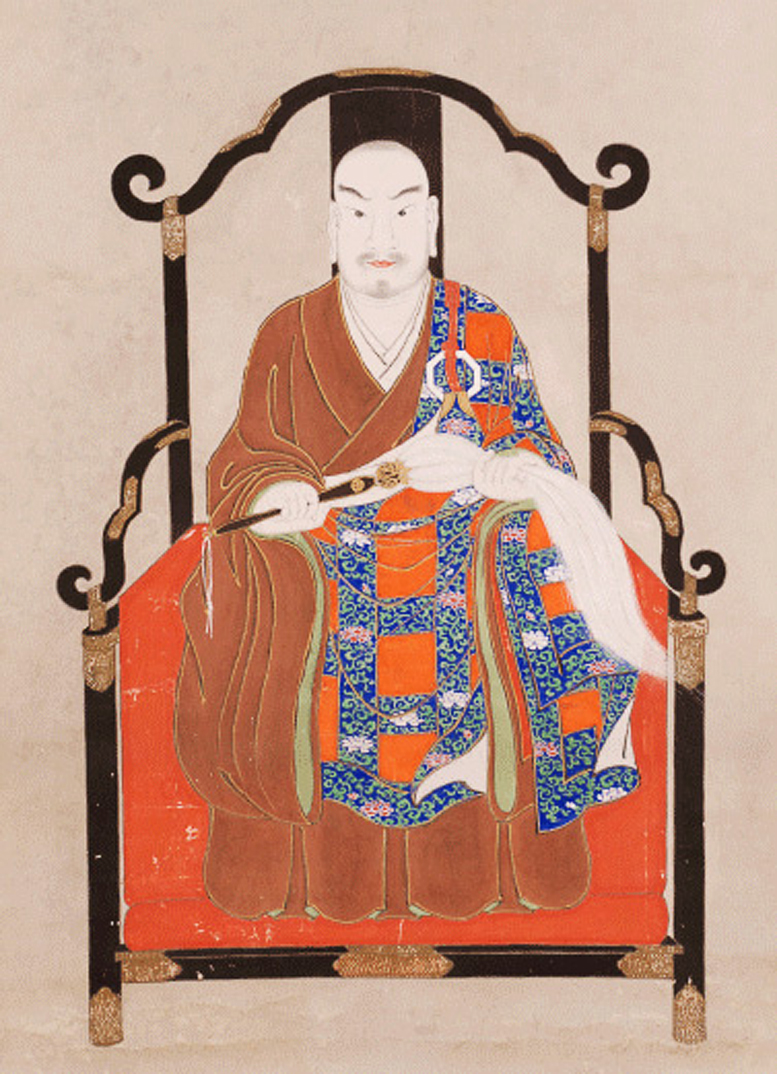

Head of Shimazu clan
- In office 1527–1566
- Preceded by: Shimazu Katsuhisa
- Succeeded by: Shimazu Yoshihisa

Personal details
- Born: May 28, 1514 Izaku Castle
- Died: July 15, 1571 (aged 57)
- Relations: Shimazu Katsuhisa (adopted father)
- Children: Shimazu Yoshihisa; Shimazu Yoshihiro; Shimazu Toshihisa; Shimazu Iehisa
- Parent: Shimazu Tadayoshi (father)

Military service
- Allegiance: Shimazu clan
- Rank: Daimyō
- Unit: Shimazu clan
- Battles/wars: Siege of Kajiki (1549); Siege of Iwatsurugi (1554)

Shimazu Takahisa (島津 貴久; May 28, 1514 – July 15, 1571), a son of Shimazu Tadayoshi, was a daimyō during Japan's Sengoku period. He was the fifteenth head of the Shimazu clan.

== Biography ==
In 1514, he is said to have been born in Izaku Castle. On 1526, Takahisa was adopted as the successor to Shimazu Katsuhisa and became head of the clan. He launched a series of campaigns to reclaim three provinces: Satsuma, Osumi, and Hyūga. While he made some progress, it would be up to the next generation in the Shimazu family to successfully reclaim them. He nurtured such future leaders like Shimazu Yoshihisa and his brothers Yoshihiro, Toshihisa and Iehisa who would, for a short time, see the Shimazu clan take over the entire island of Kyūshū; he is also said to have a daughter of unknown name.

Takahisa actively promoted relationships with foreign people and countries. He was the first daimyo to bring Western firearms into Japan, following the shipwreck of a number of Portuguese on Tanegashima in 1543. In 1549, he welcomed St. Francis Xavier and met Xavier in Ijyuin Castle. He granted the Jesuit protection to proselytize in his domain, but later retracted his support of Christianity under pressure from local Buddhist monks. Takahisa also held a diplomatic relationship with the Ryūkyū Kingdom.

In 1549, he used "Portuguese-derived" firearms to take Kajiki castle.

In 1554, Shimazu Takahisa had to take action against his rebellious kokujin vassals, Ito clan and Kimotsuki clan, at Siege of Iwatsurugi Castle.

In 1570, he relinquished the family head position to Shimazu Yoshihisa. He died in 1571.

== Notable retainers ==
- Ijuin Tadaaki
- Tanegashima Tokitaka
- Niiro Tadamoto
