= Shimazu Tadayoshi =

Japanese daimyō (1493–1568)

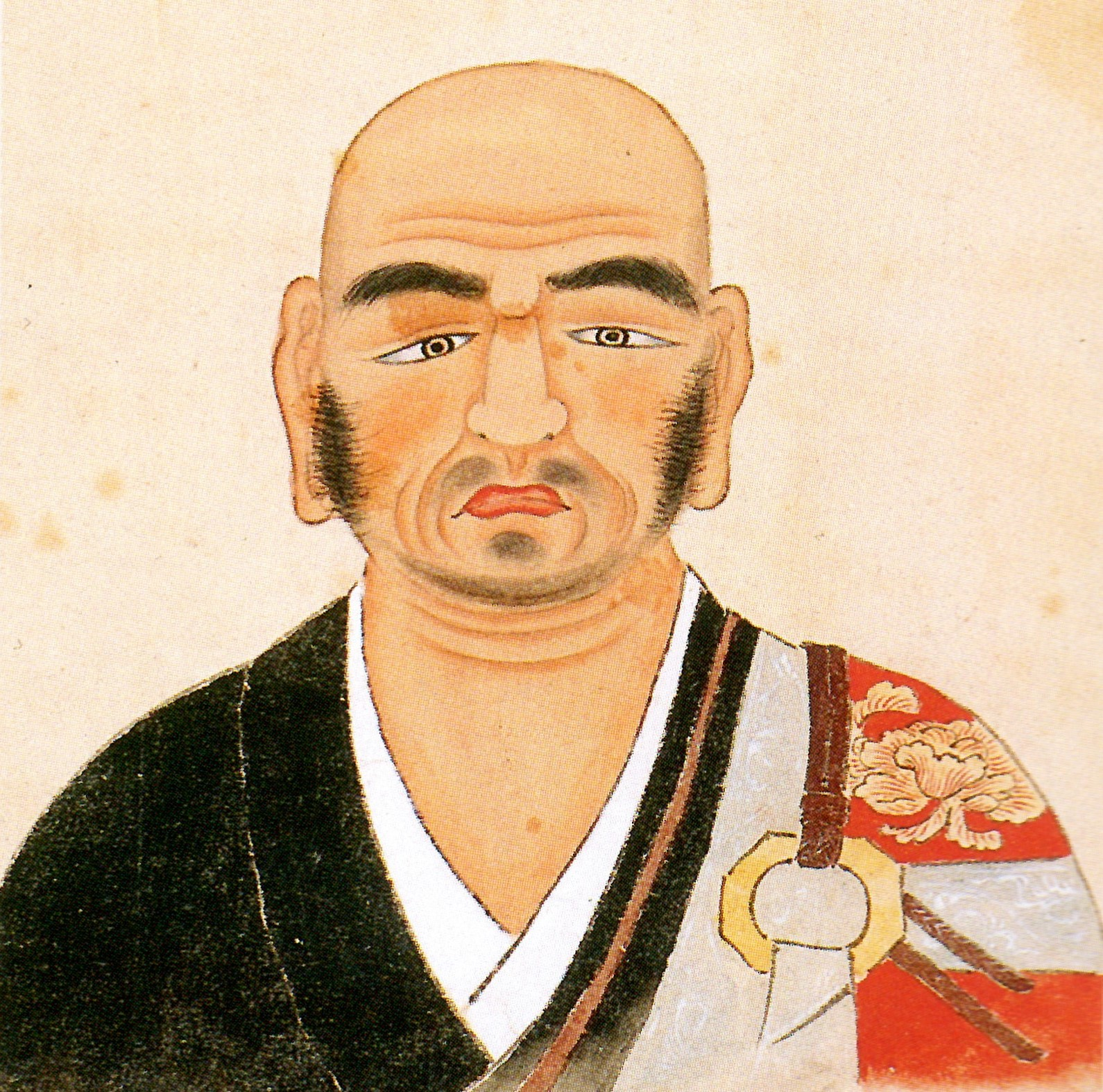
Portrait of Shimazu Tadayoshi

Shimazu Tadayoshi (島津 忠良; October 14, 1493 – December 31, 1568) was a daimyō (feudal lord) of Satsuma Province during Japan's Sengoku period. He was born into the Mimasaka Shimazu family (伊作島津家), which was part of the Shimazu clan, but after his father Shimazu Yoshihisa died, his mother married Shimazu Unkyu of another branch family, the Soshū (相州家). Tadayoshi thus came to represent two families within the larger Shimazu clan.

Shimazu Katsuhisa, who presided over the Shimazu family, did not have a son and he was driven out by Shimazu Sanehisa, who was the head of yet another branch, the Sasshū (薩州家). Sanehisa then laid claim to be the head of the clan without being properly recognized by the rest of the families. Katsuhisa asked Tadayoshi for help to regain his position, and Tadayoshi sent his son Shimazu Takahisa to be adopted by Katsuhisa. In 1526, Katsuhisa handed over the position of the head of the family to Takahisa. In 1539 though, during the Battle of Ichiki Tsurumaru Castle, Tadayoshi defeated Katsuhisa (who would regain power later) and Takahisa came to be recognized by all members of the Shimazu clan as the head.

He and his son lived together for a number of years at Uchiujijó castle and after Takahisa's succession, Tadayoshi retired to a monastery which belonged to the Zen sect. During this time Tadayoshi called himself Shimazu Nisshinsai (or Jisshinsai) (島津日新斎) He held a great amount of power, trading with the Ryūkyū Kingdom and Ming-dynasty China. He also arranged for massive purchases of arquebuses to make the clan prosperous for the planned unification of Kyūshū by Takahisa.

Tadayoshi wrote Iroha uta a set of 47 poems that conveyed Confucian moral principles in a comprehensible manner. The poems consisted of a blend of Confucian values, the Buddhist faith and the qualities for military success. Each of the 47 short poems or stanzas consisted of two lines, the first of which contains 17 syllables and the second 14. Iroha uta played an important part in ethical teachings across the Satsuma han until the end of the Edo period.

He had four grandsons Shimazu Yoshihisa, Shimazu Yoshihiro, Shimazu Toshihisa, and Shimazu Iehisa. Tadayoshi died in 1568 at the age of 77.
