= Hosokawa =

Hosokawa (typically Japanese: 細川, meaning "narrow river" or "little river") is a Japanese surname.

People with the name include:

- Bill Hosokawa (1915–2007), Japanese American author and journalist
- Chieko Hosokawa (born 1929), a Japanese manga artist
- Daisuke Hosokawa (born 1982), Japanese swimmer
- Fumie Hosokawa (born 1971), Japanese actress
- Hajime Hosokawa (1901–1970), Japanese doctor who discovered Minamata disease
- Junya Hosokawa (born 1984), Japanese footballer
- Kazuhiko Hosokawa (born 1970), Japanese golfer
- Kozo Hosokawa (born 1971), Japanese footballer
- Naomi Hosokawa (born 1974), Japanese actress
- Ritsuo Hosokawa (born 1943), Japanese politician
- Sachio Hosokawa (born 1940), Japanese sport shooter
- Seika Hosokawa (born 1979), Japanese voice actress
- Seiya Hosokawa (born 1988), Japanese baseball player
- Shigeki Hosokawa (born 1971), Japanese actor and former model
- Shinji Hosokawa (born 1960), Japanese judoka
- Takahiro Hosokawa (born 1967), Japanese rugby union player
- Takashi Hosokawa (born 1950), Japanese singer
- Toru Hosokawa (born 1980), Japanese baseball player
- Toshio Hosokawa (born 1955), Japanese composer of contemporary classical music
- Toshiyuki Hosokawa (1940–2011), Japanese actor

The Hosokawa clan were a powerful shugo daimyō in Japan.

- Hosokawa Akiuji, samurai general in the service of the Ashikaga Northern Court, during Nanboku-cho period
- Hosokawa Fujitaka (1534–1610), member of the Ashikaga court
- Hosokawa Gracia (1563–1600), childhood name Tama, Japanese noblewoman and wife of Hosokawa Tadaoki
- Hosokawa Harumoto (1514–1563), head of Hosokawa clan at the end of the Muromachi period
- Hosokawa Katsumoto (1430–1473), one of the Kanrei during Japan's Muromachi Period
- Hosokawa Masamoto (1466–1507) a Deputy-Shōgun, sun of Katsumoto
- Hosokawa Mitsunao (1619–1650), a daimyō of the early Edo period.
- Morihiro Hosokawa (born 1938), 79th Prime Minister of Japan
- Morimitsu Hosokawa (born 1972), Japanese potter
- Hosokawa Narishige (1755–1810), daimyō of the Edo period
- Hosokawa Sumimoto (1489–1520), military commander in the Muromachi period
- Hosokawa Sumiyuki (1489–1507), a notable daimyō of the Awa province
- Hosokawa Tadaoki (1563–1645), lord of Tango province, son of Hosokawa Fujitaka
- Hosokawa Tadatoshi (1586–1641), daimyo of the early Edo period
- Hosokawa Takakuni (1484–1531), military commander in the Muromachi period
- Hosokawa Tatsutaka (1615–1645), samurai of the early Edo period
- Hosokawa Ujitsuna (1514–1564) was a military commander at the end of the Muromachi period

== See also ==
- Hosokawa Micron Powder Systems
