= Siege of Tanabe =

Battle in Japan in 1600, part of the Sengoku period

- Part of the Sengoku period
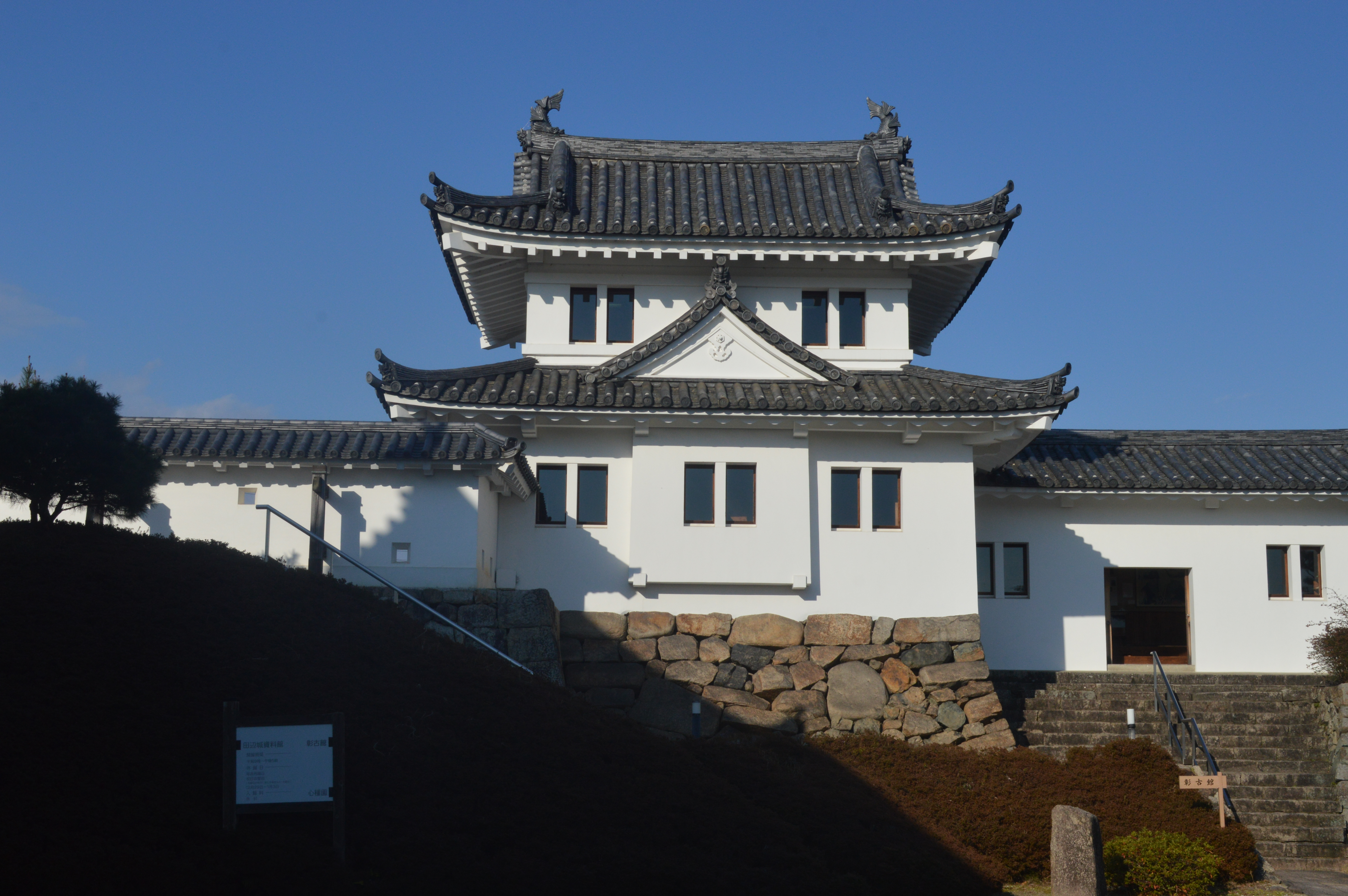
Date	1600
Location	Tanabe Castle, Tango Province, Japan 35°26′45″N 135°19′52″E
Result	inconclusive

Belligerents
Eastern army; Hosokawa clan garrison	Western army; Ikoma Chikamasa forces

Commanders and leaders
Hosokawa Fujitaka; Numata Jakō	Onoki Shigekatsu

Strength
500	15,000
- Location within Kyoto Prefecture Siege of Tanabe (Japan)

The siege of Tanabe in 1600 was one of a number of battles which took place in parallel to the more influential Sekigahara Campaign, which led to the unification of Japan under Tokugawa Ieyasu.

== History ==
The command of Tanabe Castle was held by Hosokawa Tadaoki. However, Tadaoki accompanied Ieyasu to Sekigahara, as part of the Tokugawa vanguard. Tadaoki's father Hosokawa Fujitaka and his mother Numata Jakō defended the castle walls against Ikoma Chikamasa's western forces under Onoki Shigekatsu. It is believed that, due to the respect they held for Hosokawa, the besieging army was somewhat slower and less effective than they might have been otherwise, and in the end the battle served to tie up these Western Army (anti-Tokugawa) contingents, preventing them from participating in the battle at Sekigahara.
