= Hosokawa Mitsunao =

Japanese daimyō

Hosokawa Mitsunao 細川 光尚
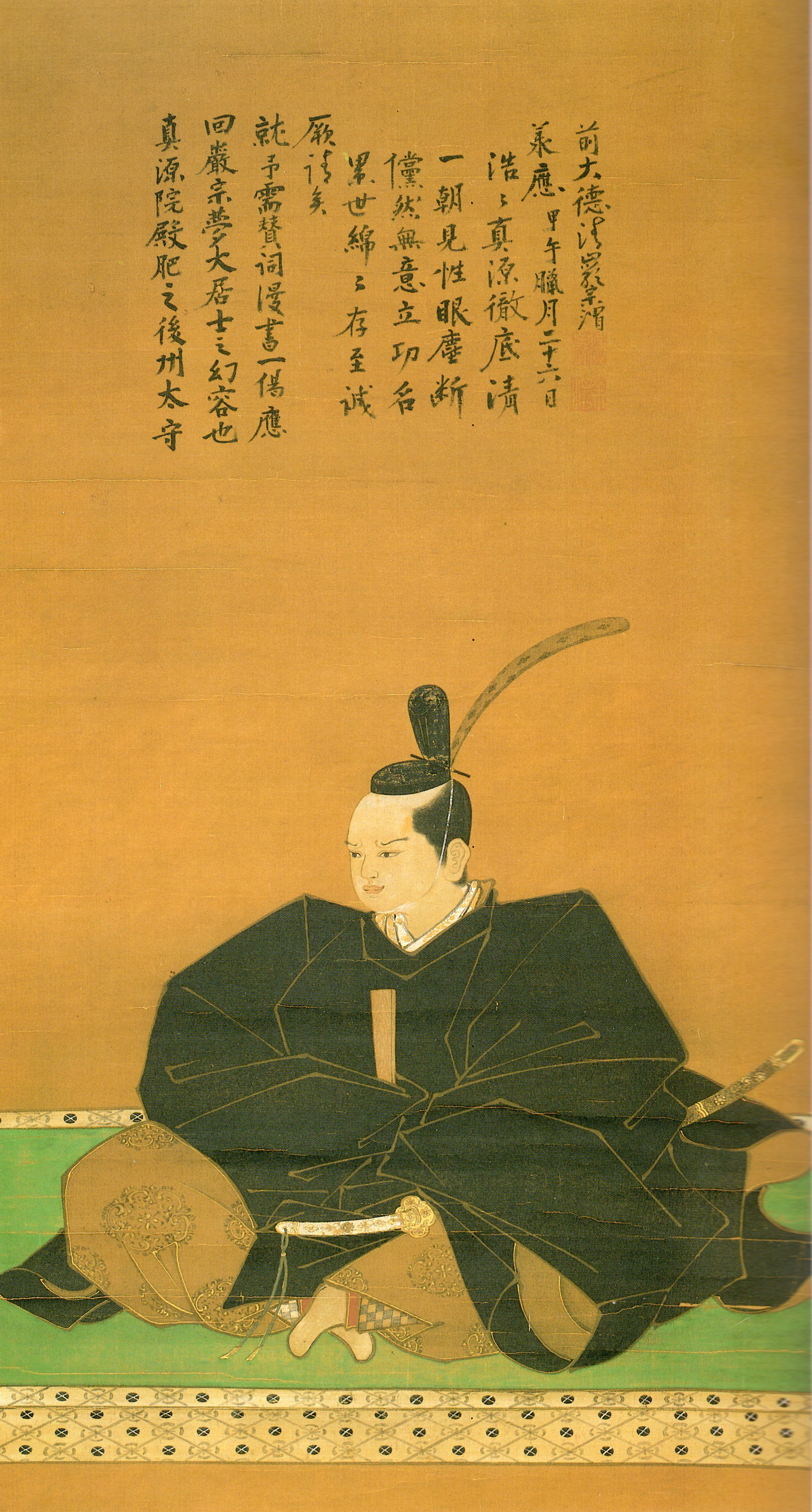

Head of Kumamoto-Hosokawa clan
- In office 1641–1650
- Preceded by: Hosokawa Tadatoshi
- Succeeded by: Hosokawa Tsunatoshi

Daimyō of Kumamoto
- In office 1641–1650
- Preceded by: Hosokawa Tadatoshi
- Succeeded by: Hosokawa Tsunatoshi

Personal details
- Born: October 26, 1619
- Died: January 28, 1650 (aged 30)
- Parent: Hosokawa Tadatoshi (father)

Military service
- Battles/wars: Shimabara Rebellion (1637)

Hosokawa Mitsunao (細川 光尚; October 26, 1619 – January 28, 1650) was a Japanese daimyō of the early Edo period. He was the grandson of the famous Christian convert (Kirishitan), Hosokawa Gracia. His great-grandfather was Hosokawa Fujitaka. His childhood name was Rokumaru (六丸).

Mitsunao was born in 1619, and was the eldest son of Hosokawa Tadatoshi.

In 1637, he joined his father in the effort to subdue the Shimabara Rebellion, and fought with distinction.

Succeeding his father in 1641, he became daimyō of the Kumamoto Domain.

Mitsunao's suppression of the Abe family's revolt in 1642 is famous, due to its fictionalization by Mori Ōgai.

== Family ==
- Father: Hosokawa Tadatoshi
- Mother: Chiyohime (1597–1649)
- Wife: Shojōin, daughter of Karasuma Mitsukata
- Concubines:
  - Seitai-in
  - Shimizu-dono
- Children:
  - Hosokawa Tsunatoshi (1643–1714) by Seitai-in
  - Hosokawa Toshishige (1647–1687) by Seitai-in

Preceded by Hosokawa Tadatoshi	Daimyō of Kumamoto; 1641–1649	Succeeded by Hosokawa Tsunatoshi

== Ancestry ==
Ancestors of Hosokawa Mitsunao

16. Mitsubuchi Harukazu
8. Hosokawa Fujitaka
4. Hosokawa Tadaoki
18. Numata Mitsukane
9. Numata Jakō
2. Hosokawa Tadatoshi
20. Akechi Mitsutsuna
10. Akechi Mitsuhide
5. Akechi Tama
11. Tsumaki Hiroko
1. Hosokawa Mitsunao
24. Ogasawara Nagatoki
12. Ogasawara Sadayoshi
6. Ogasawara Hidemasa
3. Chiyohime
28. Tokugawa Ieyasu
14. Matsudaira Nobuyasu
29. Lady Tsukiyama
7. Tokuhime
30. Oda Nobunaga
15. Tokuhime
31. Ikoma Kitsuno
