= Yukitaka =

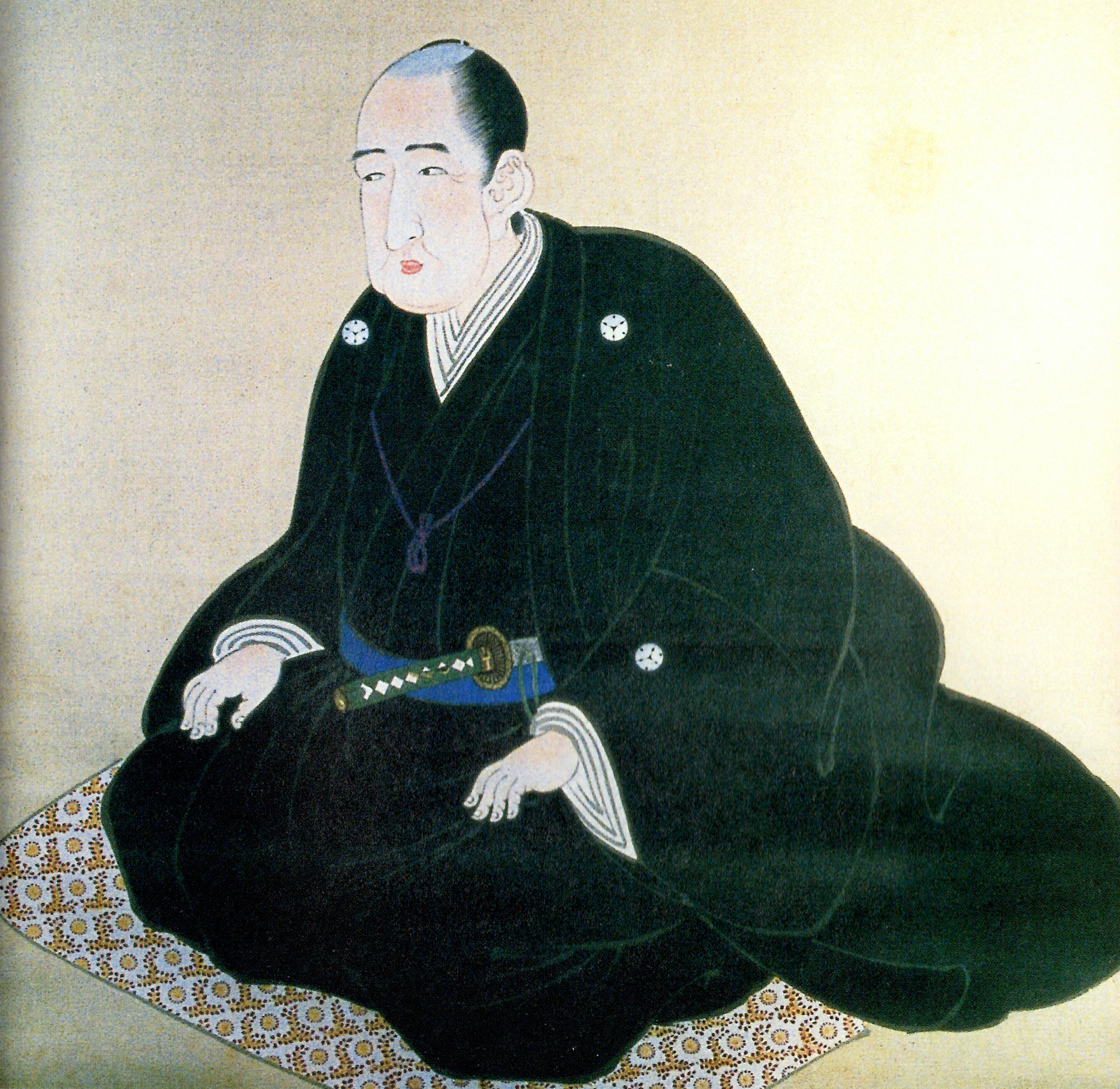
- Yukitaka Sanada (1770–1828), Japanese daimyo.
- Pronunciation: jɯkʲitaka (IPA)
- Gender: Male

Origin
- Origin: Japanese
- Meaning: Different meanings depending on the kanji used

Yukitaka is a masculine Japanese given name.

== Written forms ==
Yukitaka can be written using different combinations of kanji characters. Here are some examples:

- 幸隆, "happiness, noble"
- 幸孝, "happiness, filial piety"
- 幸喬, "happiness, high"
- 幸高, "happiness, tall"
- 幸貴, "happiness, precious"
- 行隆, "to go, noble"
- 行孝, "to go, filial piety"
- 行貴, "to go, precious"
- 之隆, "of, noble"
- 之貴, "of, precious"
- 志孝, "determination, filial piety"
- 志貴, "determination, precious"
- 志尭, "determination, high"
- 恭隆, "respectful, noble"
- 雪尭, "snow, high"

The name can also be written in hiragana ゆきたか or katakana ユキタカ.

== Notable people with the name ==
- Yukitaka Sanada (真田 幸隆; 1512–1574), Japanese daimyō
- Yukitaka Hosokawa (細川 行孝; 1637–1690), Japanese samurai
- Yukitaka Omi (小見 幸隆; born 1952), Japanese footballer
