= Shōryūji Castle =

Castle in Kyoto Prefecture, Japan

Shōryūji Castle 勝龍寺城
- Nagaokakyō, Kyoto, Japan
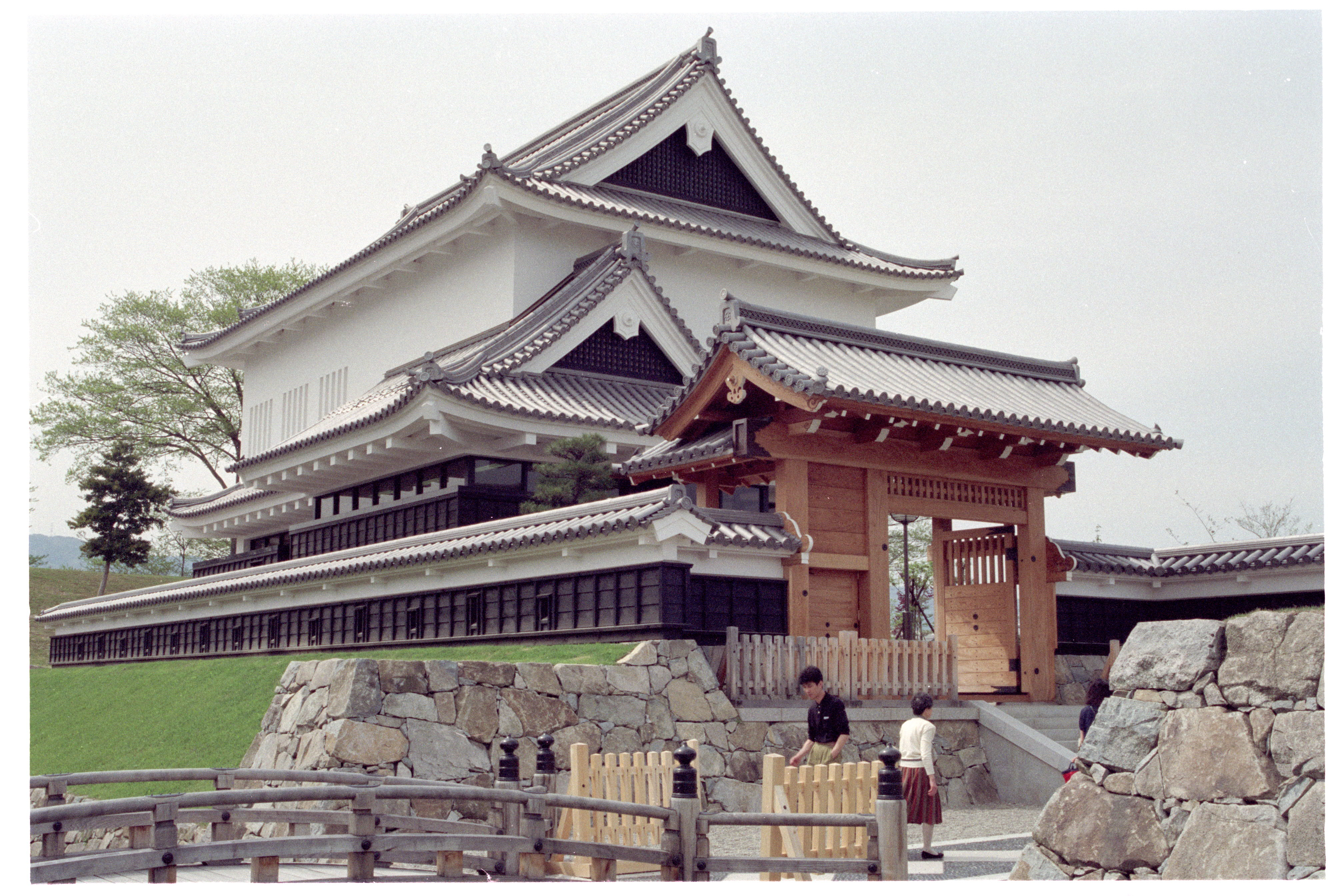
- Shōryūji Castle Aerial photograph of the Shōryūji Castle in 2025

Site information
- Type: hilltop
- Owner: City of Nagaokakyō, Kyoto
- Condition: Imitation stone walls and turrets reconstructed

Location
- Coordinates: 34°55′5.21″N 135°42′2.49″E

Site history
- Built: 19 September, 1339
- Built by: Hosokawa Yoriharu
- In use: 1339 - 1649
- Materials: Dry moats, earthwork, earthen bridges, stone walls, wood
- Demolished: 1649

Garrison information
- Occupants: Yokoyama clan, Akechi Mitsuhide Hosokawa clan, Nagai clan (Nagai Clan, etc.

Shōryūji Castle (勝龍寺城, Shōryūji-jō) is a castle in Nagaokakyō, Kyoto, Japan.

== History ==
This castle was constructed in 1339 by Hosokawa Yoriharu, a major samurai commander under Ashikaga Takauji, the founder of the Ashikaga shogunate.

The area around the castle is a strategic foothold to defend Kyoto, the capital of Japan at that time, from western threats. During the Ōnin War, this castle was used as a castle of the western alliance and became occupied by Iwanari Tomomichi, a daimyō of the Miyoshi clan, during the Sengoku period. The castle fell to Oda Nobunaga in 1568, and was given to Hosokawa Fujitaka, who occupied it until 1579.

At the battle of Yamazaki between Toyotomi Hideyoshi and Akechi Mitsuhide, following Mitsuhide's killing of Nobunaga, this castle's garrison collapsed, forcing Mitsuhide to flee to his death.

== Access ==
- Nagaokakyo Station of Tokaido Main Line

== Gallery ==
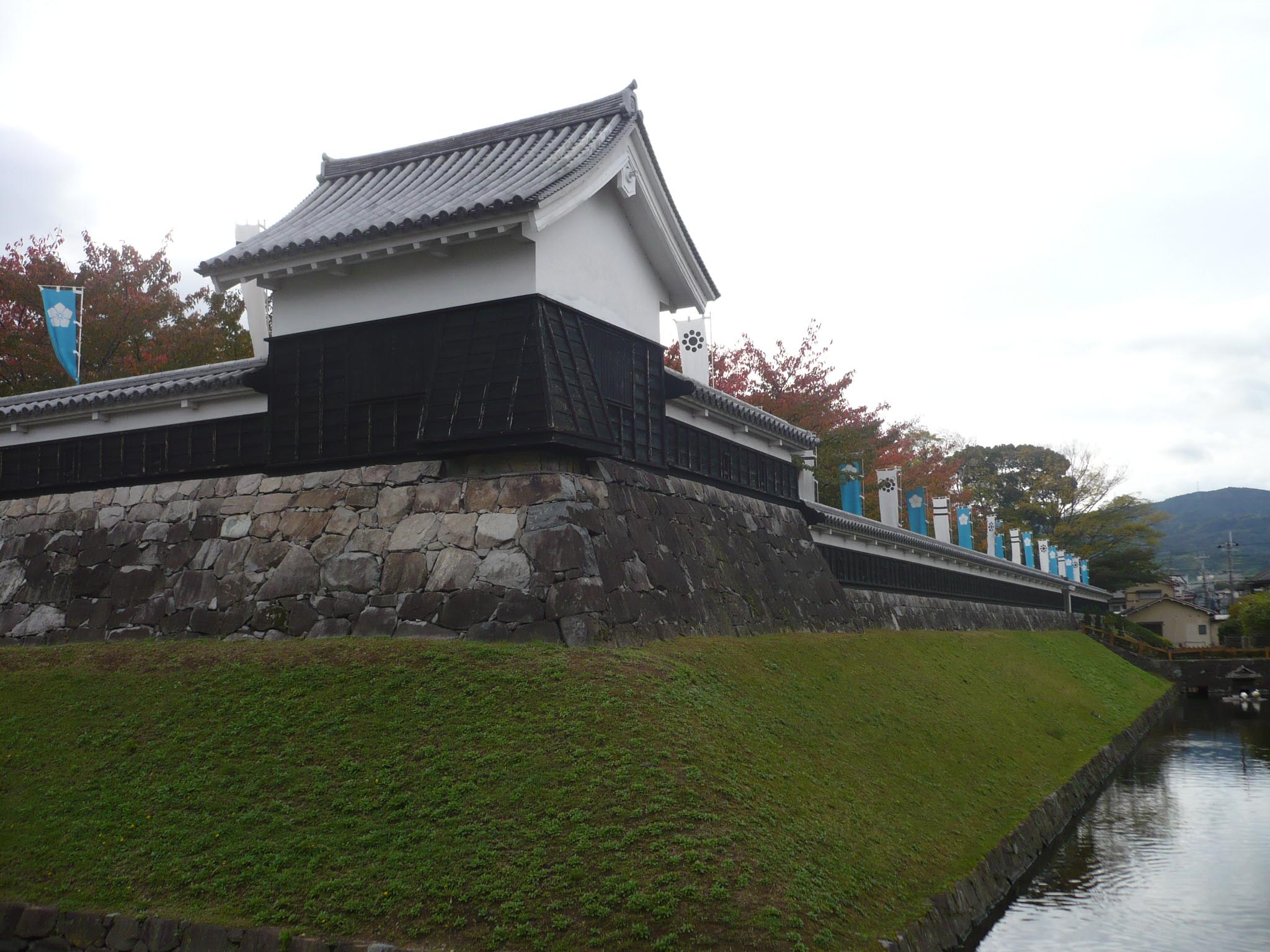
The yagura and a moat.

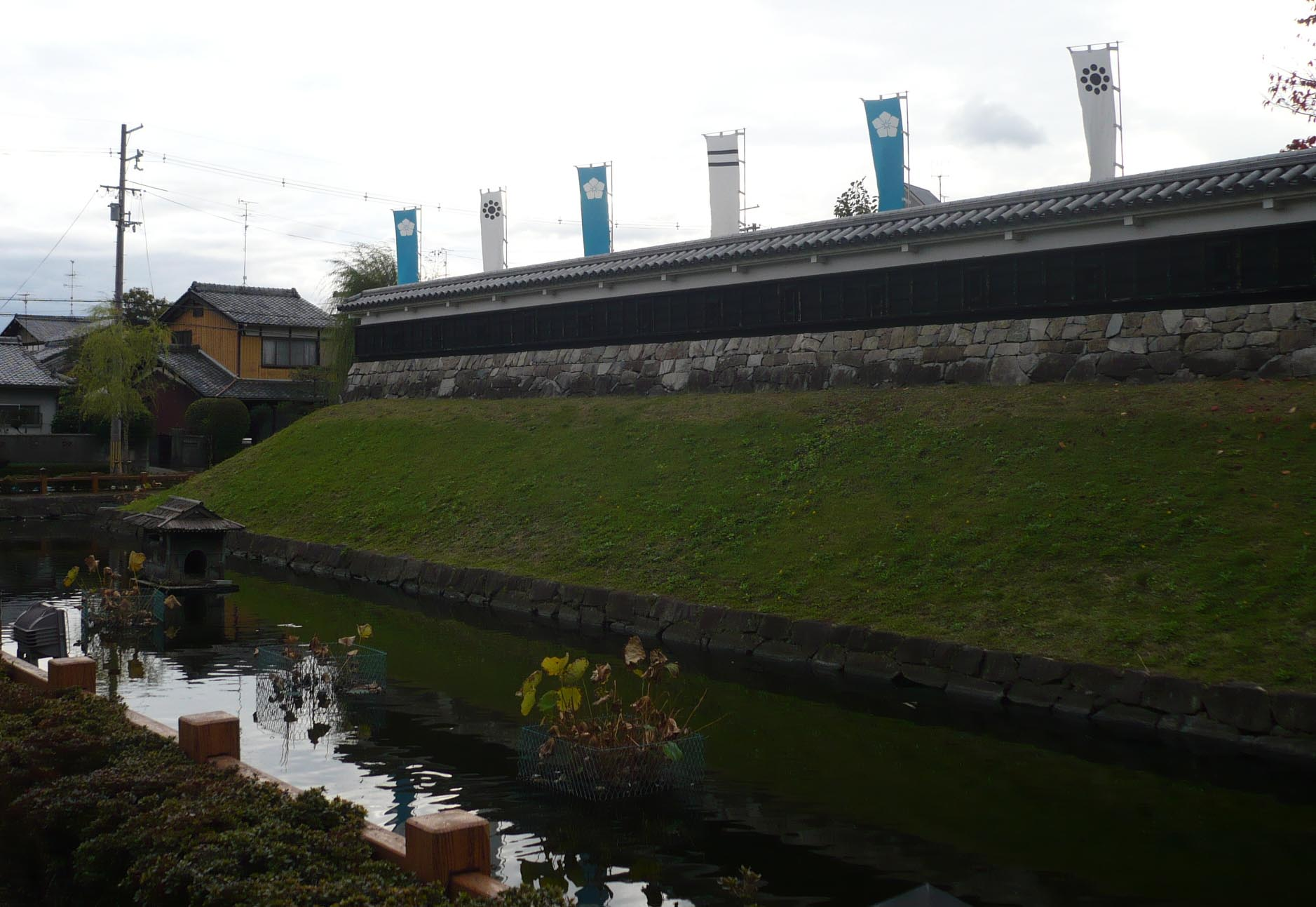
fence and moat

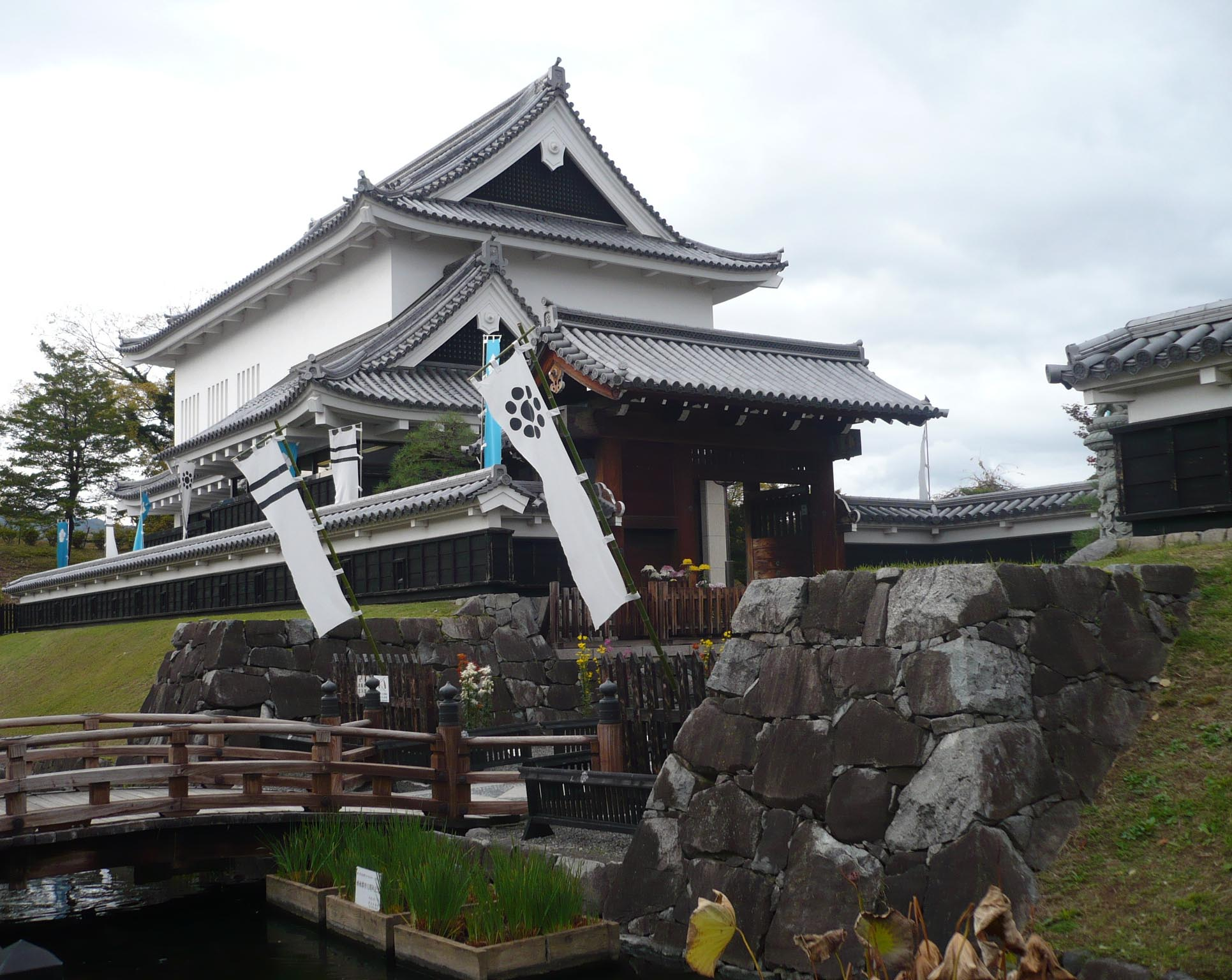
Replica turret and remains of tiger's mouth

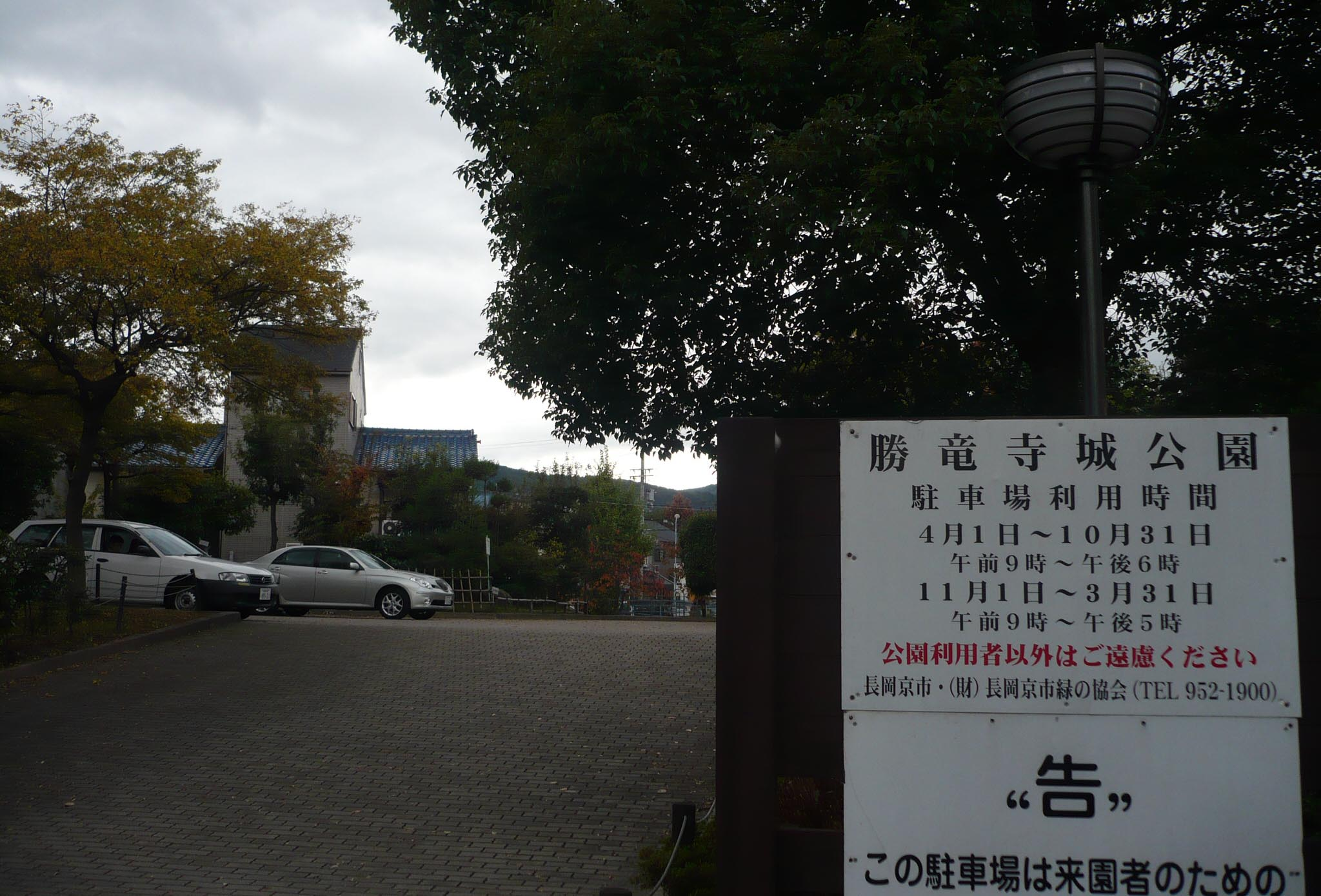
Parking lot at Shoryuji Castle Park

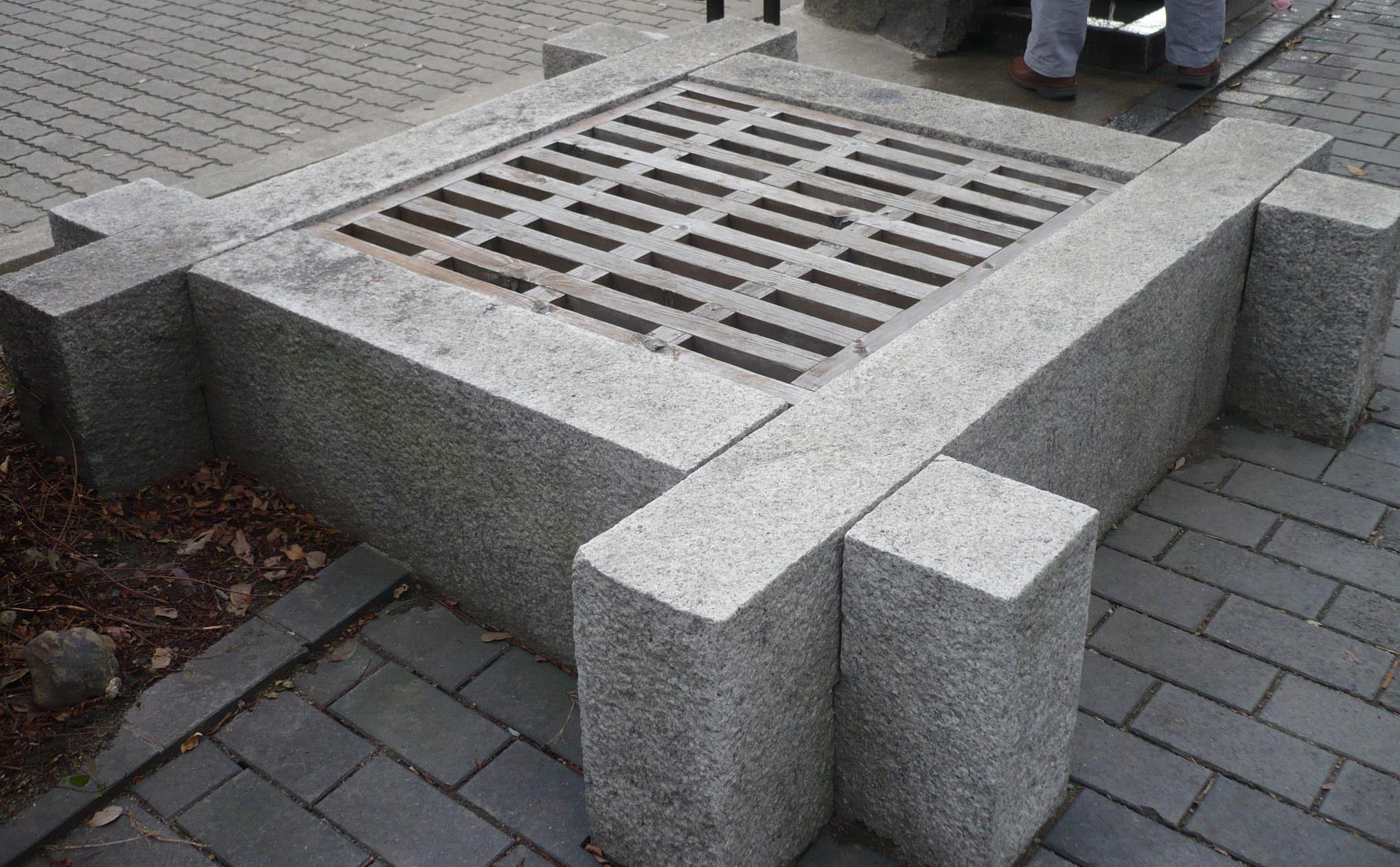
Well ruins

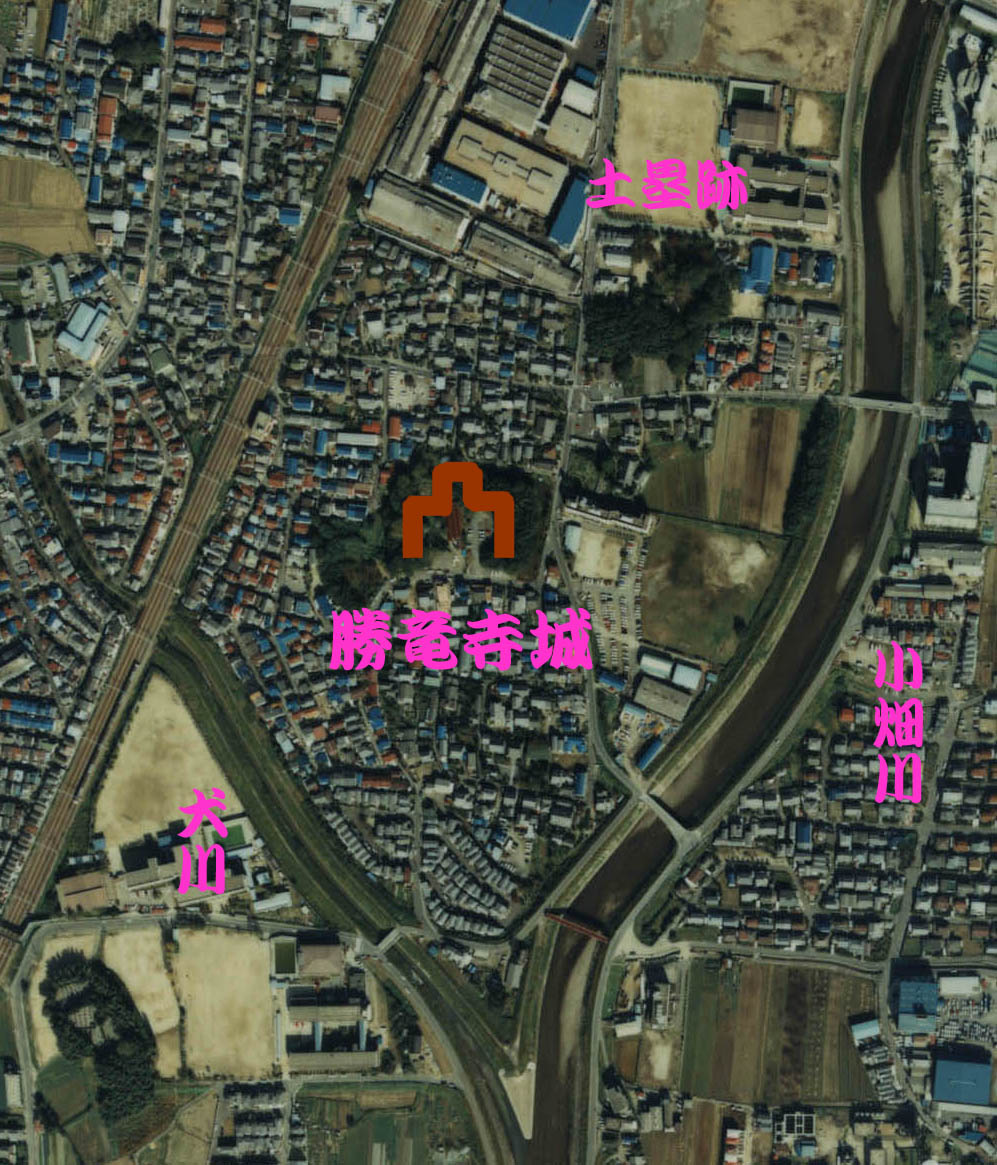
The estimated castle grounds of Shoryuji Castle

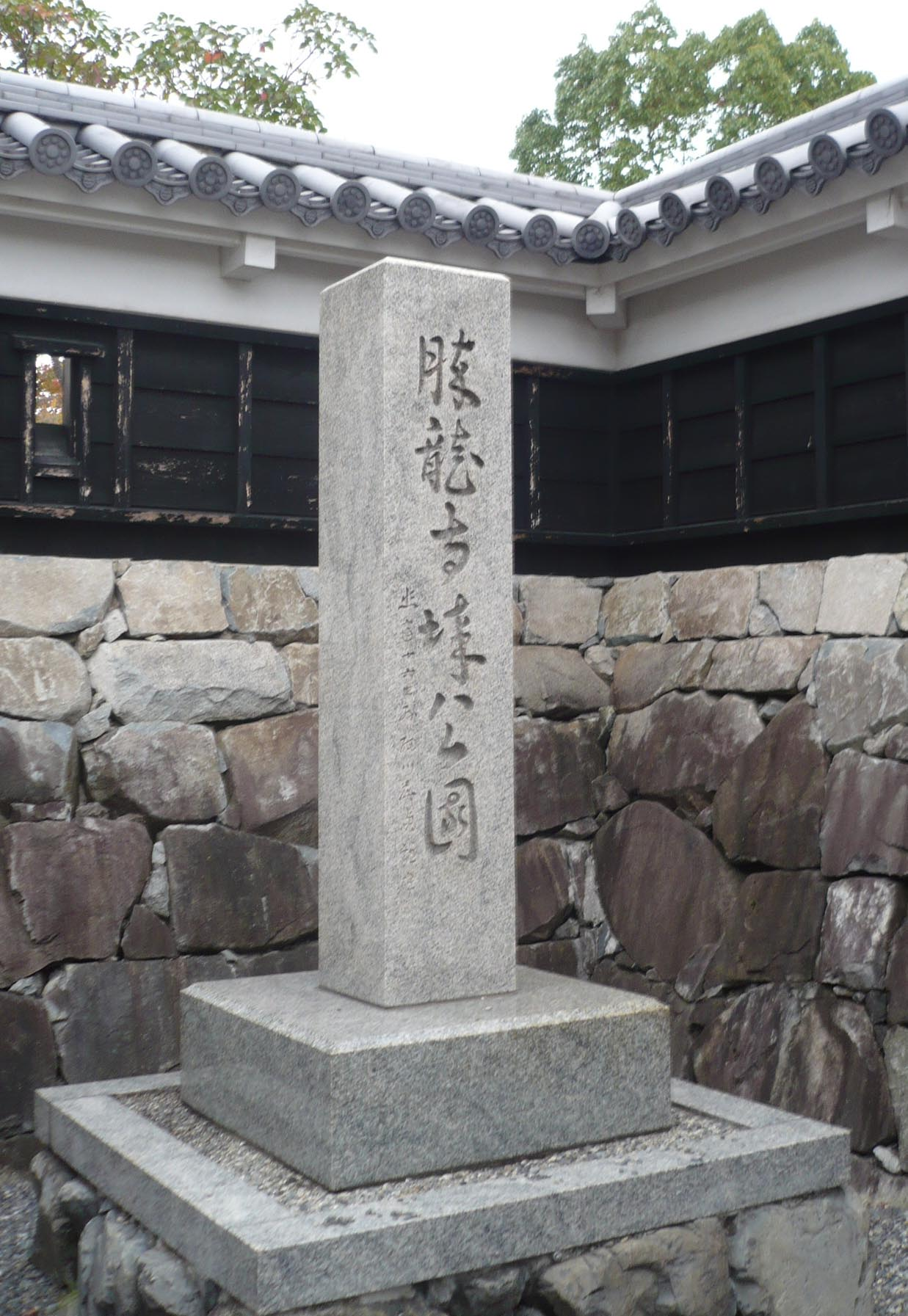
Stone marker at Shoryuji Castle Park

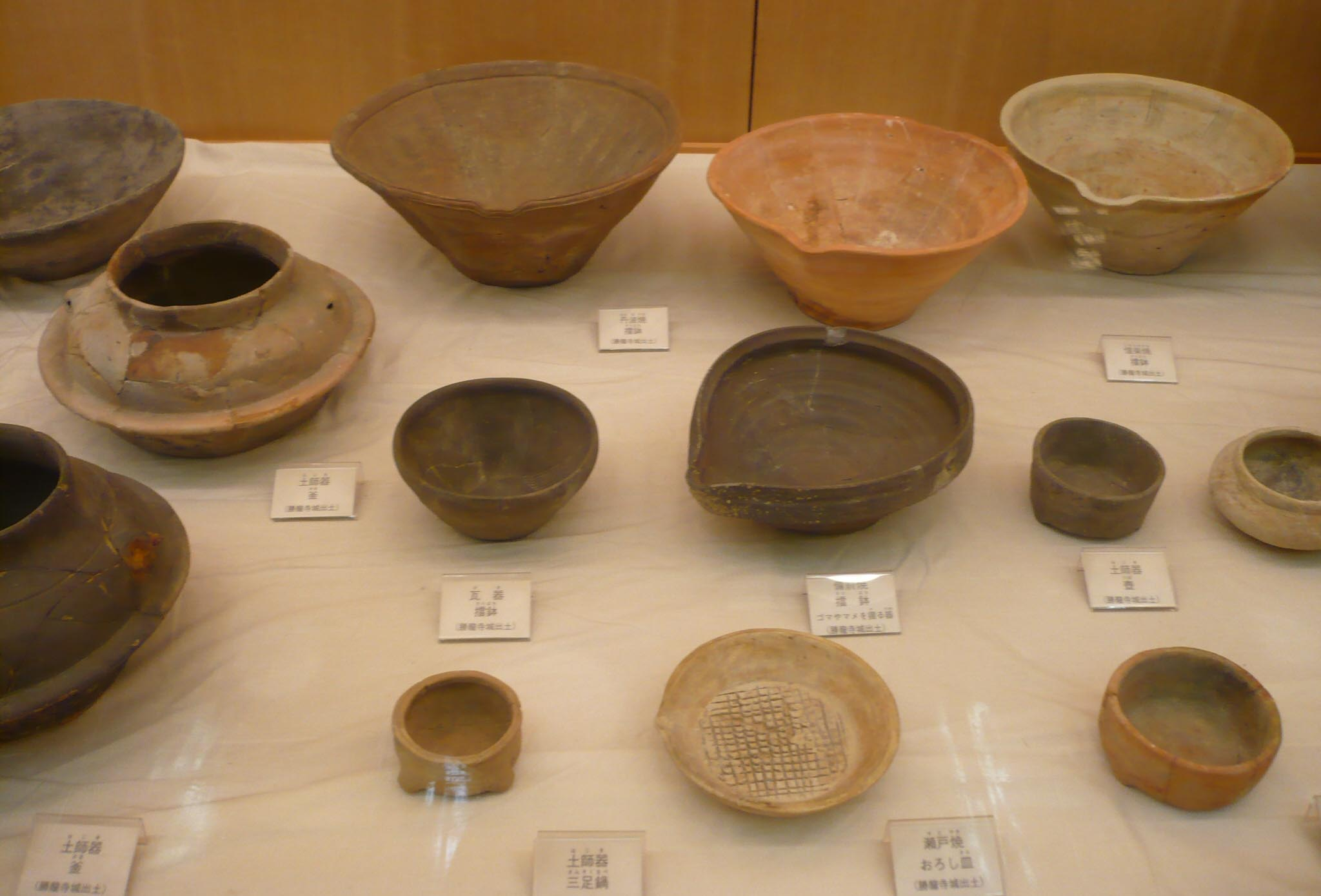
Excavated artifacts from Shoryuji Castle

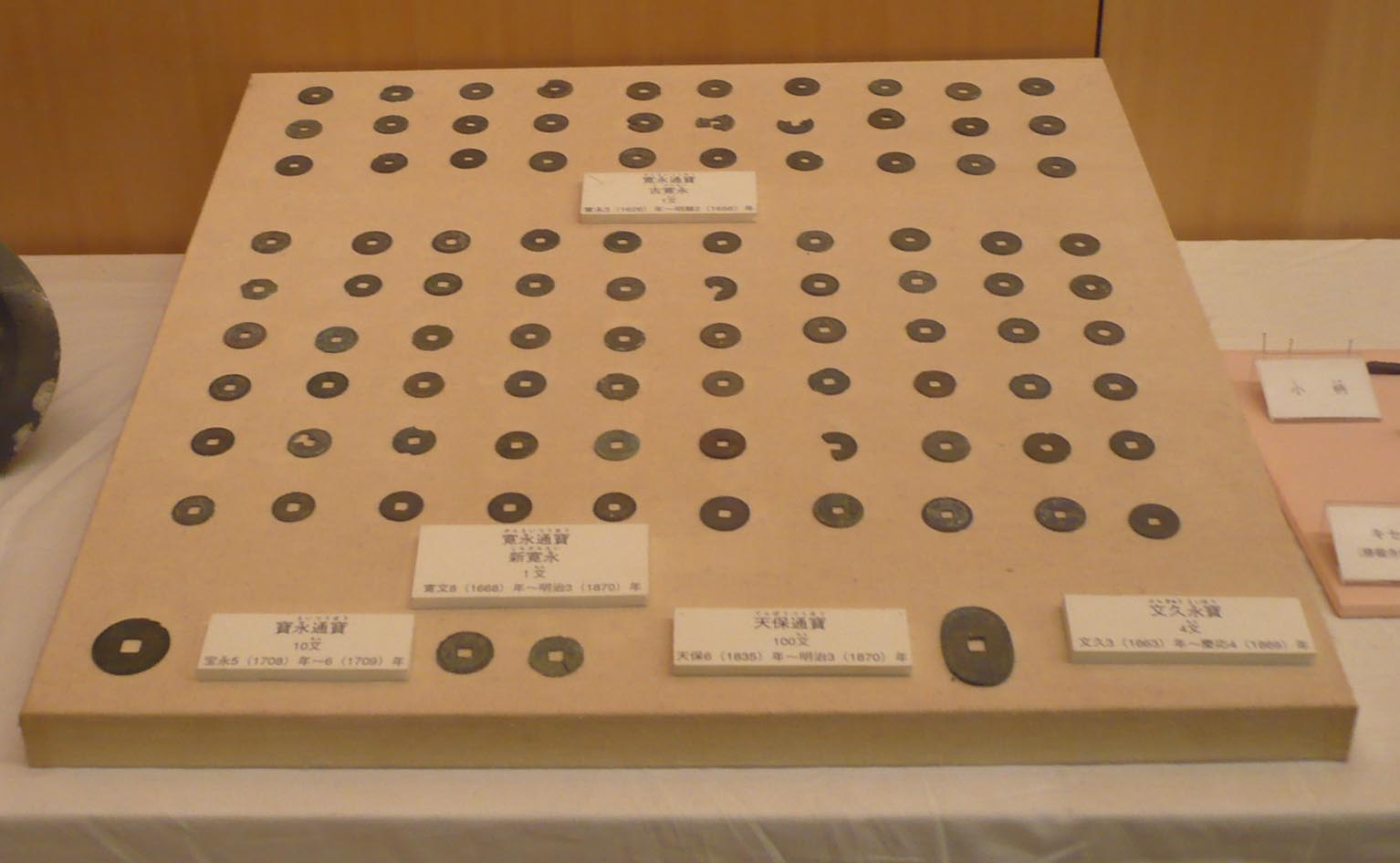
Excavated coins from Shoryuji Castle

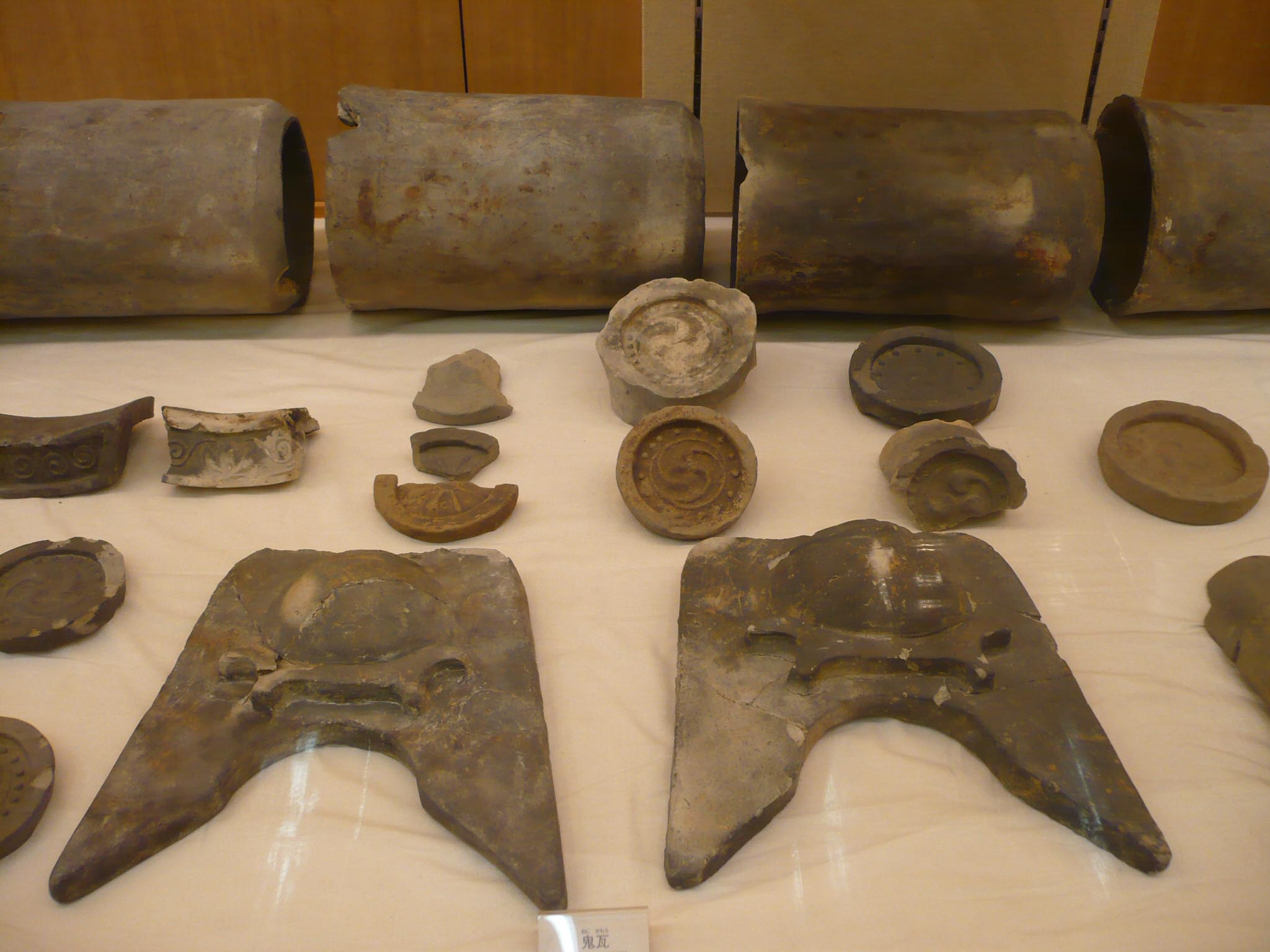
Excavated artifacts from Shoryuji Castle

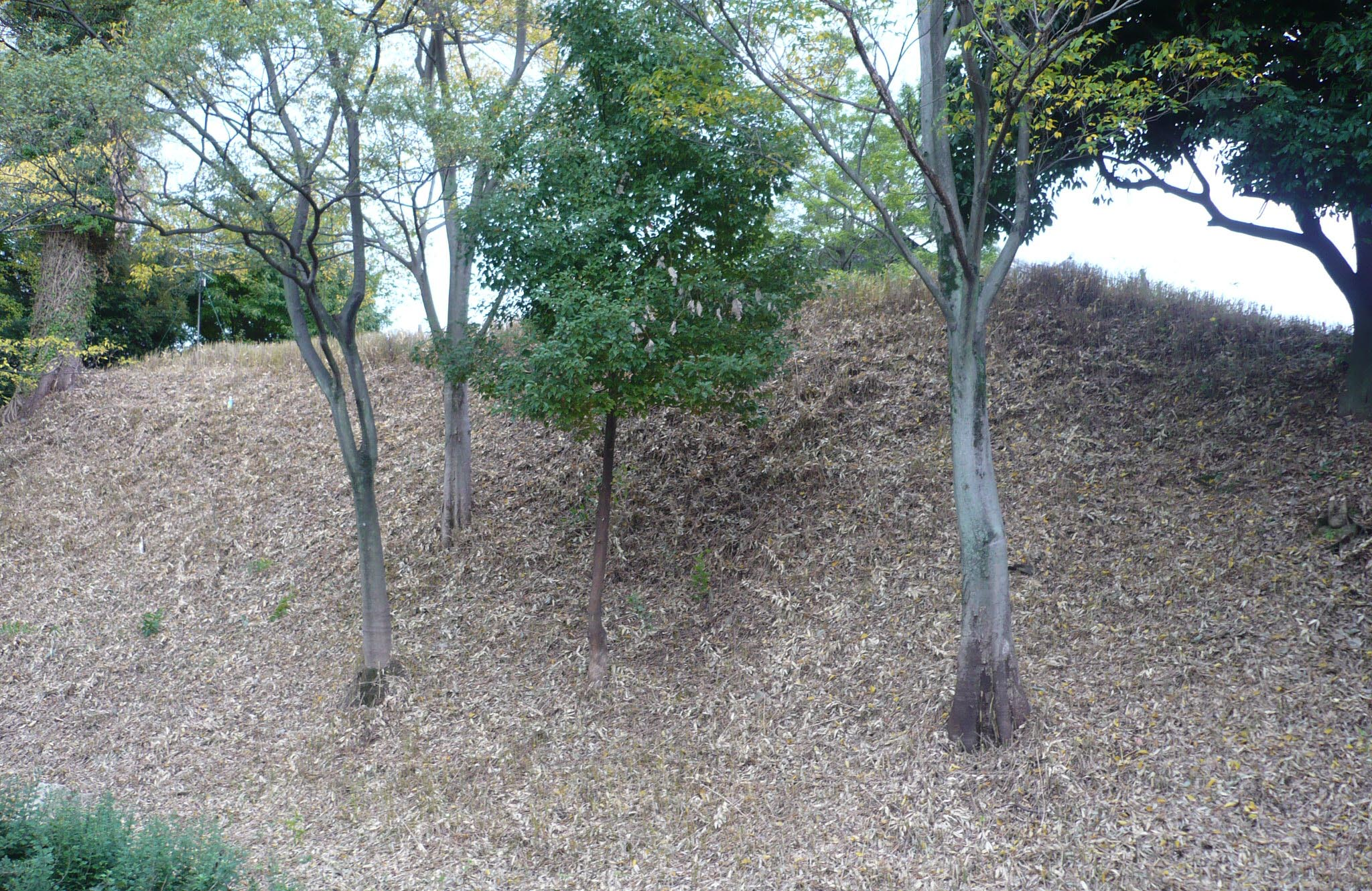
Earthen wall of Shōryūji Castle
