= Hosokawa Tatsutaka =

Hosokawa Tatsutaka (細川立孝, 1615 – July 4, 1645) was a Japanese samurai in the Sengoku period.

== Early life ==
Tatsutaka was the fourth son of Hosokawa Tadaoki (1563–1646). In 1634, he married Tsuru, the daughter of Gojo Tameyuku. They had two sons, Hosokawa Yukitaka and Hosokawa Kamematsu, and one daughter. He had one concubine.

Tatsutaka participated in the suppression of the Shimabara Rebellion in 1638. The next year, he was granted an audience with the shōgun.

== Daimyo ==
The Uto Domain (30,000 koku) was created in Higo Province when Tadaoki abdicated, so that Tatsutaka would have a fief to inherit upon his father's death. However, Tatsutaka died the same year, and rights of inheritance were transferred to his first son Yukitaka (1637–1690), so that he and his young siblings would be not be left impoverished. The child Yukitaka thus became the first lord of the newly created Uto Domain on the death of his father in 1646. He also became head of a cadet branch of the Hosokawa clan.
