= Hosokawa Yukitaka =

Hosokawa Yukitaka (細川行孝; March 30, 1637 – July 9, 1690) was a Japanese samurai in the Edo Period.

== Daimyo ==
The Uto Domain (30,000 koku) was created in Higo Province when Hosokawa Tadaoki abdicated, so that Hosokawa Tatsutaka would have a fief to inherit upon his father's death. However, Tatsutaka died the same year, and rights of inheritance were transferred to his first son Yukitaka, so that he and his young siblings would be not be left impoverished. The child Yukitaka thus became the first lord of the newly created Uto Domain on the death of his father in 1646. He also became head of a cadet branch of the Hosokawa clan.
