= Uto Castle =

Castle ruins in Uto, Kumamot, Japan

- 宇土城
- Uto, Kumamoto Japan
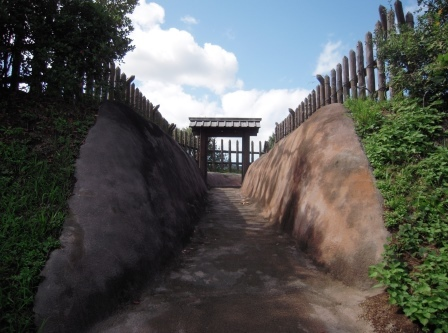
- Reconstructed entry to Uto Castle

Site information
- Type: yamajiro-style Japanese castle
- Controlled by: Hosokawa clan
- Open to the public: yes
- Condition: Archaeological and designated national historical site; castle ruins

Location
- Coordinates: 32°40′46″N 130°39′11″E

Site history
- In use: Sengoku - Edo period
- National Historic Site of Japan

Uto Castle (宇土城, Uto-jō) was a Sengoku period flatland-style Japanese castle located in the present-day Furushiro-cho neighborhood of the city of Uto, Kumamoto Prefecture, Japan. Its ruins have been protected as a National Historic Site since 2020.

== Overview ==
The castle ruins actually consist of two separate castles located on a small, independent hill called "Nishiokadai" located to the west of the current city. This hill is about 700 meters long from east to west, about 350 meters wide at its widest point from north to south, and about 39 meters above sea level at its highest point, and it is believed that almost the entire hill was the castle grounds. The center of medieval Uto Castle is called "Senjojiki", and numerous traces of pillars remain stacked on top of each other. This indicates that the building was rebuilt many times. In the early Kofun period (around the 4th century), Senjojiki was used as a defensive residence for the local chieftain, and there is also evidence that a kofun burial mound was built there around the 5th century. Medieval Uto Castle is thought to have been built in the Heian period, around 1048, by the local Uto clan, a cadet branch of the Kikuchi clan, which then dominated Higo Province. The Kikuchi was strong supporters of Emperor Go-Daigo against the Ashikaga shogunate in the wars of the Nanboku-cho period, and the castle occupied a strategic nexus of land and sea transportation routes in western Kyushu. The Uto clan gradually increased in power and threatened the Kikuchi clan, but were defeated in 1503 and their castle laid waste. The site was soon occupied by Nawa Nagatoshi, another local warlord, who had been driven from his stronghold at Minamata by the Sagara clan.

Under Nawa Nagatoshi, Uto Castle was rebuilt with numerous enclosures protected by clay walls and dry moats. The Nawa lost their independence in 1587 with Toyotomi Hideyoshi's conquest of Kyushu, with the southern half of Higo Province coming under the control of Hideyoshi's general Konishi Yukinaga. Konishi found the site of the original Uto Castle to be too constricted, with no room for a proper castle town, and unsuitable for defense against cannon, so he built a new castle approximately 500 meters to the east. The new fortification had rectangular enclosures protected by tall stone walls and wet moats, and include a three-story tenshu. From westward to southward and eastward of central area, secondary area protected the backside of the castle. At northward, in front of central area, there was a third area which was used as a residence of high class retainers. Total size of the castle was about 500 meter long and 800 meter long, and the castle town spreads northeast direction from the castle to Midorigawa river. There was a river port at the edge of the castle thus Uto Castle directly connected to Ariake Sea. However, as he had sided with the western armies in the 1600 Battle of Sekigahara, the victorious Tokugawa Ieyasu dispossessed him of his holdings, and awarded them to Kato Kiyomasa, who already controlled northern Higo Province from his stronghold a Kumamoto Castle. It was long claimed that the tenshu of Uto Castle was dismantled by Kato Kiyomasa and relocated to Kumamoto Castle where it became the "Uto Yagura", but an investigation in 1927 could find no physical evidence that this story was true. Kiyomasa had intended to use Uto Castle as his retirement home and substantially improved its stone walls and built numerous structure. After his death, in 1632 Higo Province came under the control of the Hosokawa clan, which was ordered to thoroughly destruct Uto Castle. This was partly in accordance was the "one castle per domain" policy, but also due to the fact that the 1637 Shimabara rebellion was led by former retainers of the Konishi clan. The stone walls of the castle were completely ruined and moats surrounding the castle was totally reclaimed. In 1646, the second daimyō of Kumamoto Domain, Hosokawa Mitsunao, gave 30,000 koku to his cousin Hosokawa Yukitaka to create a cadet branch of the clan and installed him at Uto as head of Uto Domain. As he was not allowed a castle, he erected a jin'ya and the castle grounds fell into ruin.

At present, parts of the castle grounds are preserved as a historical park called "Historic Site of Uto Castle Ruins," some of the remains, such as the remains of buildings, moats, and castle gates, have been restored. The park also includes a number of stone sarcophagus from the Kofun period which have been found in the surrounding area.The site of Ninomaru is now a municipal cemetery, and the site of Sannomaru has been developed into housing and a school site, with almost no trace of the former castle

The bronze statue of Konishi Yukinaga standing in the park is a fictional portrait of Yukinaga, and as a naval commander under the Toyotomi, he is facing the sea and has his back to the city of Uto.

== See also ==
- List of Historic Sites of Japan (Kumamoto)
- Siege of Uto, a siege of Uto Castle during the final years of the Azuchi–Momoyama period (17th century) of Japan
- Uto Domain

== Literature ==
- Benesch, Oleg and Ran Zwigenberg (2019). Japan's Castles: Citadels of Modernity in War and Peace. Cambridge: Cambridge University Press. p. 374. ISBN 9781108481946.
- De Lange, William (2021). An Encyclopedia of Japanese Castles. Groningen: Toyo Press. pp. 600 pages. ISBN 978-9492722300.
