= Hosokawa Tadatoshi =

Japanese samurai daimyō

Hosokawa Tadatoshi 細川 忠利
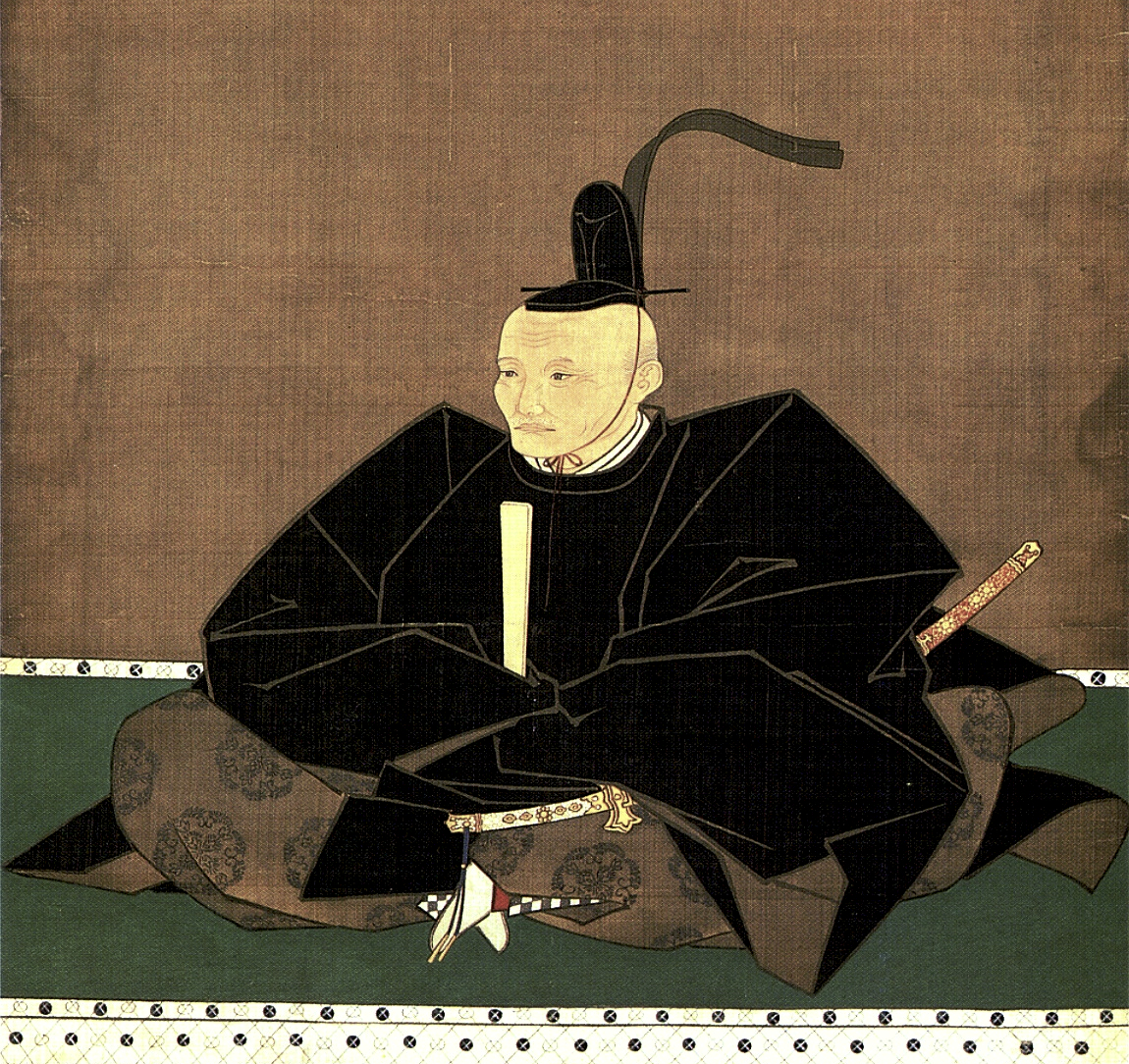

Head of Kumamoto-Hosokawa clan
- In office 1620–1641
- Preceded by: Hosokawa Tadaoki
- Succeeded by: Hosokawa Mitsunao

Daimyō of Kokura
- In office 1620–1633
- Preceded by: Hosokawa Tadaoki
- Succeeded by: Ogasawara Tadazane

Daimyō of Kumamoto
- In office 1633–1641
- Preceded by: Katō Tadahiro
- Succeeded by: Hosokawa Mitsunao

Personal details
- Born: December 21, 1586
- Died: April 26, 1641 (aged 54)
- Spouse: Chiyohime
- Children: Hosokawa Mitsunao
- Parents: Hosokawa Tadaoki (father); Hosokawa Gracia (mother)

Military service
- Battles/wars: Shimabara Rebellion (1637)

Hosokawa Tadatoshi (細川 忠利; December 21, 1586 – April 26, 1641) was a Japanese samurai daimyō of the early Edo period. He was the head of Kumamoto Domain. He was a patron of the martial artist Miyamoto Musashi.

He married Chiyohime (1597–1649) daughter of Ogasawara Hidemasa and adopted daughter of the second Tokugawa shōgun, Hidetada. His childhood name was Mitsuchiyo (光千代).

Having studied the Yagyū Shinkage-ryū under Ujii Yashiro, Tadatoshi wanted his guest, Musashi, to fight against the sword master of his fief, and see which style was the strongest. But Ujii, despite his full license in Yagyu Shinkage style, could not strike a single blow against him after numerous bouts. Lord Tadatoshi took over, but he too was powerless against Musashi. He said then about Musashi: "I never imagined there could be such a difference in levels of accomplishment!"

In 1637, Tadatoshi and his son Hosokawa Mitsunao joined in the effort to subdue the Shimabara Rebellion, and fought with distinction.

Tadatoshi's grave is in Kumamoto. His grandfather was Hosokawa Fujitaka.

== Family ==
- Father: Hosokawa Tadaoki
- Mother: Hosokawa Gracia
- Wife: Chiyohime (1597–1649)
- Children:
  - Hosokawa Mitsunao by Chiyohime
  - Fujihime married Matsudaira Tadahiro
  - Hosokawa Munemoto
  - daughter married Ariyoshi Hidenaga
  - Hosokawa Naofusa
  - Nanjo Mototomo (1641–1703)

== Gallery ==
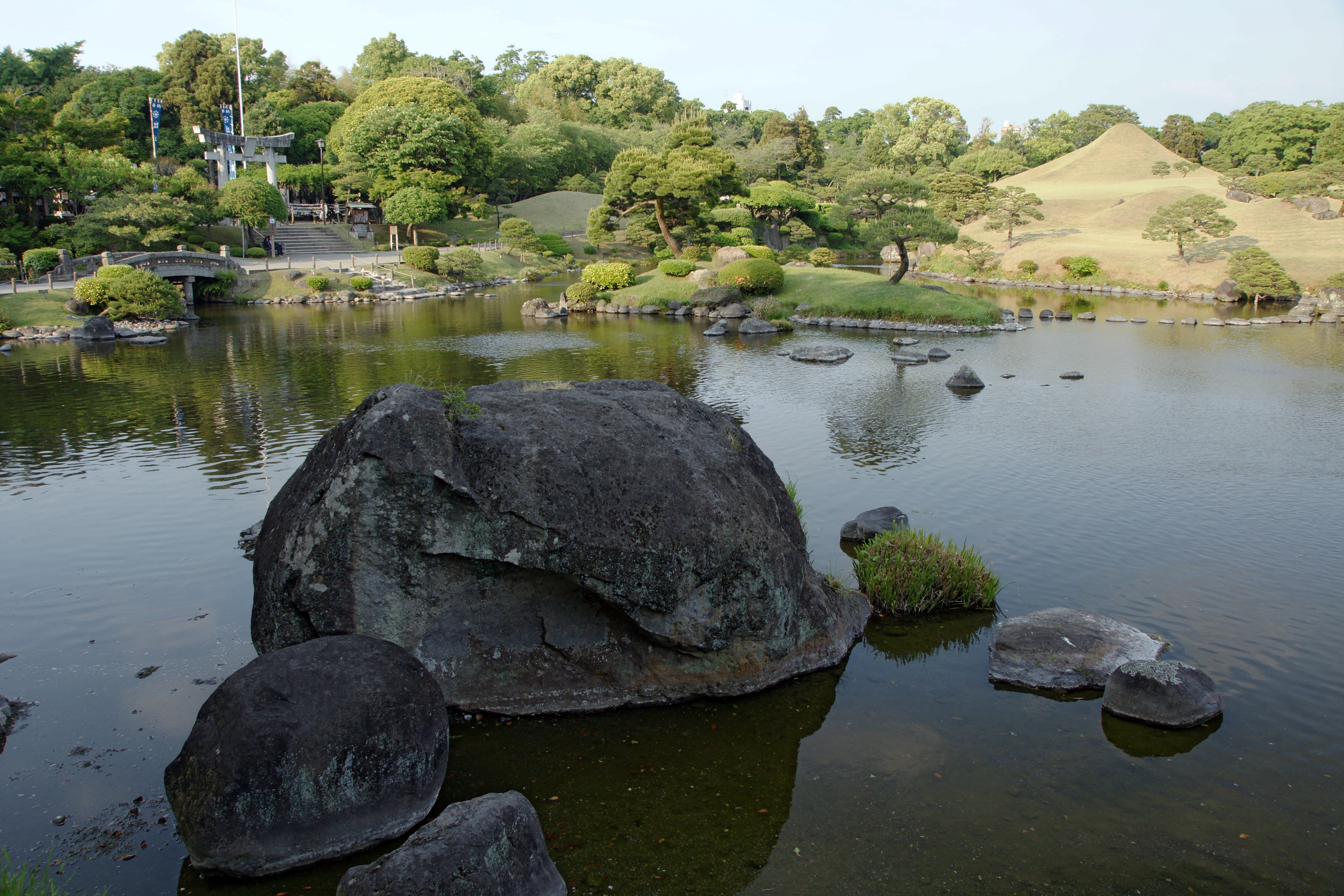
This tea retreat, which was established by Hosokawa Tadatoshi, remains a popular tourist attraction

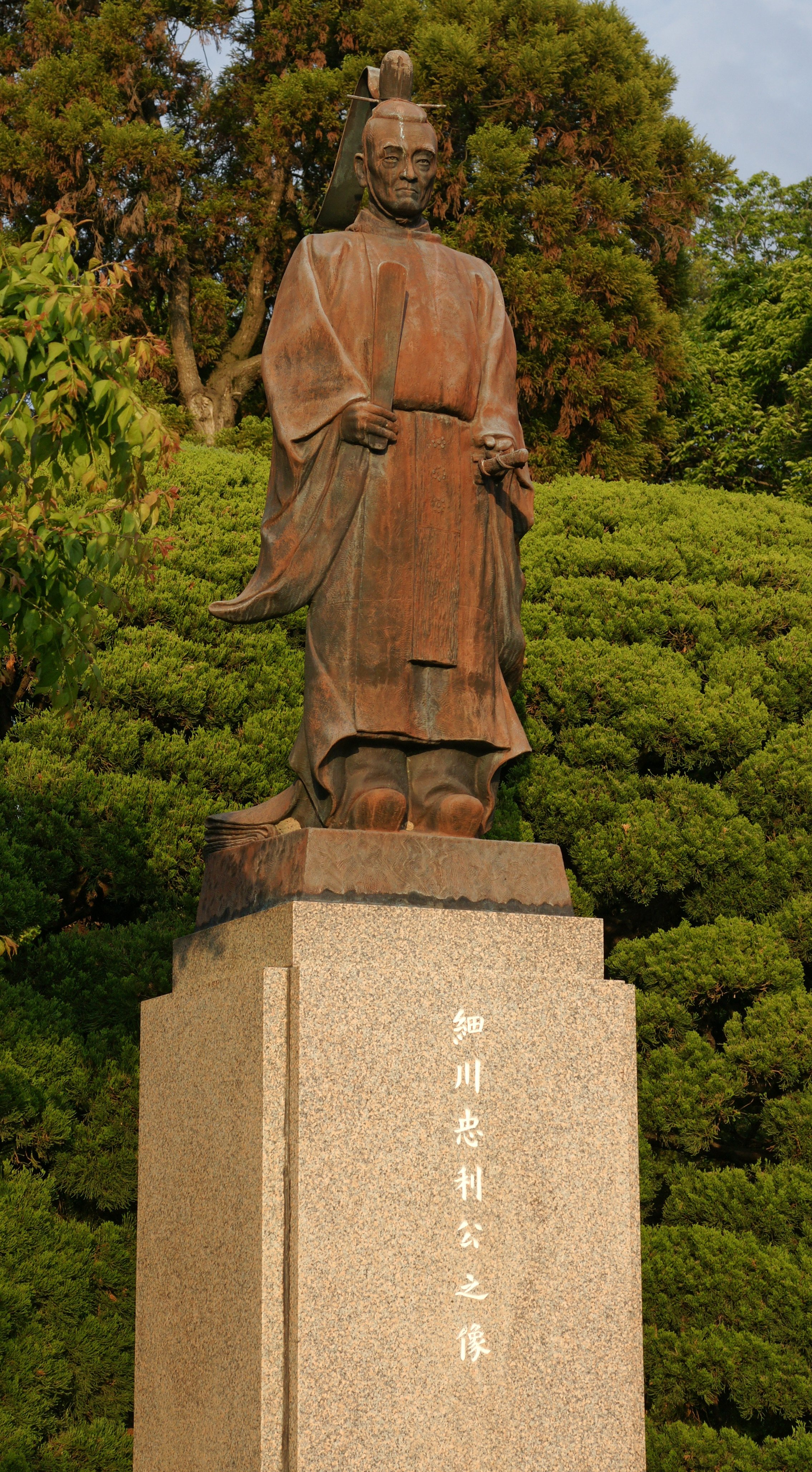
Statue of Hosokawa Tadatoshi at Suizen-ji Jōju-en

== Ancestry ==
Ancestors of Hosokawa Tadatoshi

16. Hosokawa Motoari
8. Mitsubuchi Harukazu
4. Hosokawa Fujitaka
2. Hosokawa Tadaoki
10. Numata Mitsukane
5. Numata Jakō
1. Hosokawa Tadatoshi
24. Akechi Mitsutsugu
12. Akechi Mitsutsuna
6. Akechi Mitsuhide
3. Akechi Tama
7. Tsumaki Hiroko

Preceded by Hosokawa Tadaoki	Daimyō of Kokura; 1620–1633	Succeeded by Ogasawara Tadazane
Preceded by Katō Tadahiro	Daimyō of Kumamoto; 1633–1641	Succeeded by Hosokawa Mitsunao
