= Iwanari Tomomichi =

Samurai

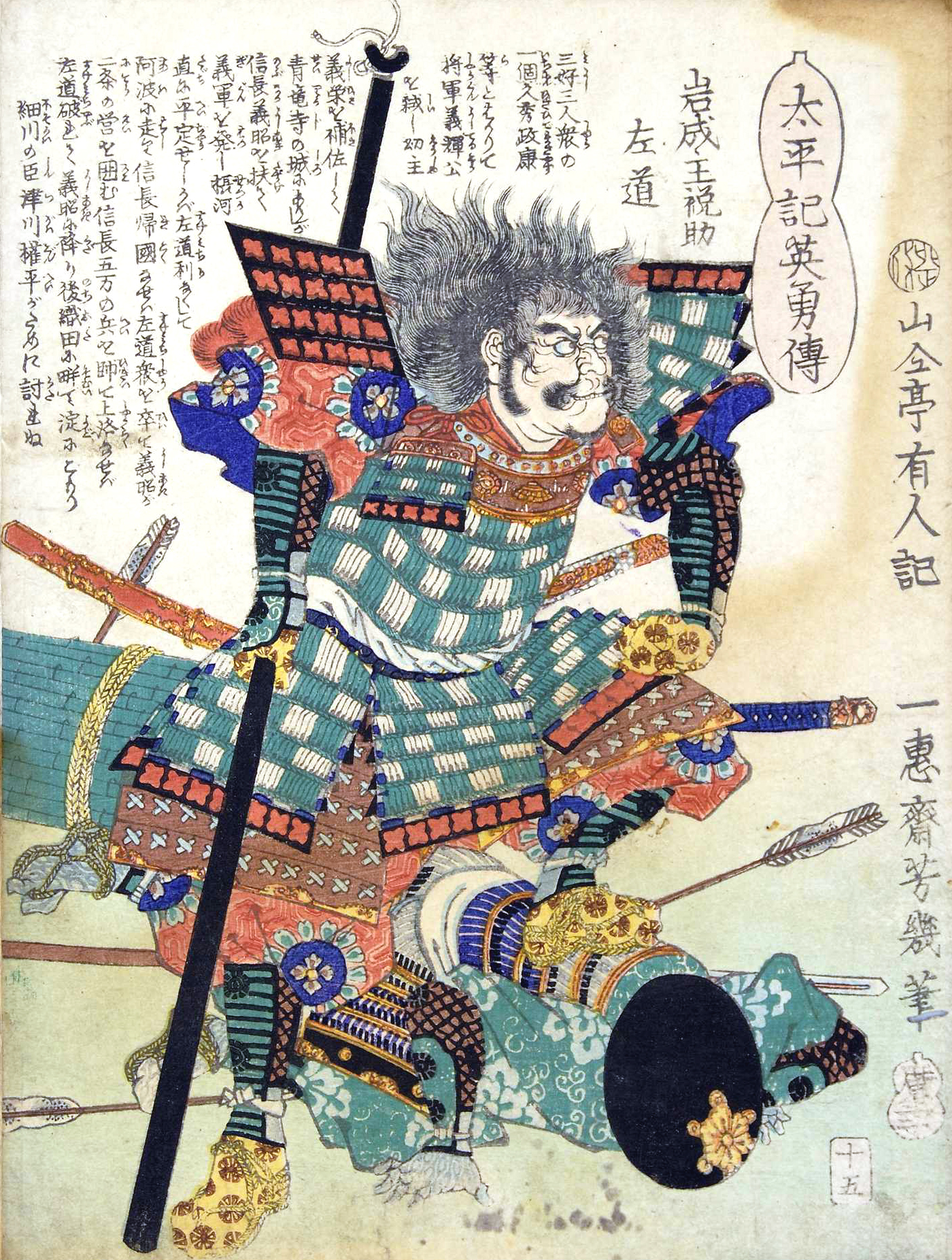
Portrait of Iwanari Tomomichi from Utagawa Yoshiiku's Heroes of the Taiheiki

Iwanari Tomomichi (岩成 友通; 1531 – August 2, 1573) was a Japanese samurai of the 16th century. Also known as Ishinari Tomomichi (石成友通), he was a senior retainer of the Miyoshi clan. He was one of the three great samurai of the Miyoshi clan called Miyoshi Sanninshu along with Miyoshi Nagayuki and Miyoshi Masayasu. Leading an uprising against the forces of Oda Nobunaga toward the end of his life, Iwanari was killed by Hosokawa Fujitaka in battle at Shoryuji Castle. Iwanari Tomomichi is remembered as a determined and loyal samurai who fought for the survival and restoration of the Miyoshi clan during one of the most turbulent periods in Japanese history.
