= Hosokawa Micron Powder Systems =

American powder processing equipment manufacturer

- Formerly: Pulverizing Company
- Company type: Private
- Industry: Chemical; Pharmaceutical
- Founded: 1923; 102 years ago in Elizabeth, New Jersey, United States
- Founder: Louis Ruprecht
- Headquarters: Summit, New Jersey, United States
- Area served: Worldwide
- Owner: Hosokawa Micron Group
- Website: www.hmicronpowder.com

Hosokawa Micron Powder Systems is an American company located in Summit, New Jersey, which designs and manufactures equipment for size reduction, classification and mixing of chemical, pharmaceutical and food materials. The company was started in 1923 by Louis Ruprecht named Pulverizing Company and was later bought by the Hosokawa Micron Group in 1985.

== History ==
In 1923 Louis Ruprecht, a graduate from Stevens Institute of Technology, founded Pulverizing Company with offices in New York City and a small machine shop in Elizabeth, New Jersey. The company focused its efforts in micronizing or size reduction of powder materials. The first machine patented was the Mikro-Pulverizer which accomplished powder size reduction by mechanically impacting material with the use of a hammer and screen.

The business outgrew its facilities in Elizabeth and moved to Roswell Park in 1932. In ten more years the company had once more outgrown these facilities and moved to Summit, New Jersey where it currently resides. In May, 1942 the Summit location opened and was immediately contracted by the US Army and Navy to produce materials for World War II. From 1942 to 1945 the company produced parts for tanks, warships and airplanes. Over one million pounds of magnesium powder were produced for tracer bullets and flares. During this time the Summit location was heavily guarded.

In 1954, Louis Ruprecht died and the company was sold to Metals Disintegration Company in Union, New Jersey. After a number of ownership changes, finally, in 1985 the company was sold to the Micron Powder Group and the name was changed to Hosokawa Micron Powder Systems. The company current operates in a 14,000 square foot facility in Summit, New Jersey.
