= Ujii Yashiro =

Samurai

Ujii Yashirō (雲林院 弥四郎; 1581 - 1669) was a retainer under the Japanese Hosokawa clan during the Edo period (17th century).

== Life ==
The Hosokawa lord, Hosokawa Tadatoshi, had previously practiced the Yagyū Shinkage-ryū art of the sword. At the time, Yashiro was the principal sword master of the fief.

Tadatoshi had, at one time, wanted for Yashiro to duel against the famous swordsman, Miyamoto Musashi. Musashi had hesitated when hearing this, because Ujii had precedence of rank over him within the fief and had the status of master. However, they both finally agreed to have a duel against each other.

During their duel, Yashiro had fought within the presence of his lord, who had sent away all other vassals, with the exception of one, who was to bear his sword. After the two adepts had fought for three rounds, even though Musashi had made not attacks, Yashiro was unable to defeat him. Rather than defeating Yashiro directly, Musashi, taking Lord Tadatoshi’s presence and support of Yashiro into account, contented himself with dominating Yashiro by rendering his techniques ineffective. Tadatoshi himself fought Musashi after this duel, and later said, after never being able to deliver a single blow of his sword, "I never imagined there could be such a difference in levels of accomplishment!”
