= Uto Domain =

Japanese domain of the Edo period

Uto Domain 宇土藩
- Domain of Japan
- 1646–1870
- Mon of the Hosokawa clan
- Capital: Uto jin'ya
- Area
  - Coordinates: 32°41′03.83″N 130°39′41.49″E
- Government
  - Type: Daimyō
- Historical era: Edo period
  - Established: 1646
  - Disestablished: 1870
Preceded by	Succeeded by
Kumamoto Domain	Kumamoto Domain
- Today part of: Kumamoto Prefecture
- Location of Uto Jin'ya Uto Domain (Japan)

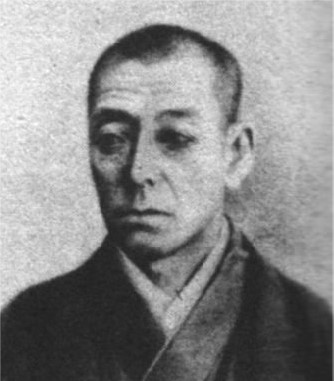
Hosokawa Yukizane, final daimyo of Uto Domain

Uto Domain (宇土藩, Uto-han) was a Japanese domain of the Edo period. It was regarded as a sub-domain of Kumamoto Domain. It was based at the Uto jin'ya in what is now the city of Uto, Kumamoto. It was ruled by a cadet branch of the tozama daimyō Hosokawa clan for all of its history.

== History ==
The domain was headed by a cadet branch of the Hosokawa clan of Kumamoto. In 1624, the second daimyō of Kumamoto Domain, Hosokawa Mitsunao set aside estates in Uto District and Shimomashiki District in Higo Province with a kokudaka of 30,000 koku for his cousin, Hosokawa Yukitaka, and authorized him to establish a cadet branch of the Hosokawa clan. This was done partly as "insurance" to ensure the survival of the parent domain in the event that succession of the main lineage fail. The headquarters for this new domain was near the ruins of Uto Castle, but as a subsidiary domain, Hosokawa Yukitaka was not authorized to rebuild the castle, but instead constructed a jin'ya as his stronghold and administrative center. The domain survived for 11 generations until it was merged back into Kumamoto Domain in 1870 and then abolished with the Meiji restoration.

== List of daimyō ==
#	Name	Tenure	Courtesy title	Court Rank	kokudaka
Hosokawa clan, 1646–1870 (Tozama daimyo)
1	Hosokawa Yukitaka (細川幸隆)	1646–1690	Tango-no-kami (丹後守)	Junior 5th Rank, Lower Grade (従五位下)	30,000 koku
2	Hosokawa Arikata (細川有孝)	1690–1703	Izumi-no-kami (和泉守)	Junior 5th Rank, Lower Grade (従五位下)	30,000 koku
3	Hosokawa Okinori (細川興生)	1703–1735	Izu-no-kami / Yamashiro-no-kami (伊豆守、山城守)	Junior 5th Rank, Lower Grade (従五位下)	30,000 koku
4	Hosokawa Okisato (細川興里)	1735–1745	Yamato-no-kami (大和守)	Junior 5th Rank, Lower Grade (従五位下)	30,000 koku
5	Hosokawa Okinori]] (細川興文)	1745–1772	Nakatsukasa-no-shosuke (中務少輔)	Junior 5th Rank, Lower Grade (従五位下)	30,000 koku
6	Hosokawa Narishige (細川斉茲)	1772–1787	Izumi-no-kami / Etchu-no-kami (和泉守、越中守)	Junior 4th Rank, Lower Grade (従四位下)	30,000 koku
7	Hosokawa Tatsuyuki (細川立之)	1787–1818	Izumi no kami (和泉守)	Junior 5th Rank, Lower Grade (従五位下)	30,000 koku
8	Hosokawa Narimori (細川斉護)	1818–1826	Etchu-no-kami / Sakon'e-no-chujo (越中守、左近衛権中将、侍従)	Junior 4th Rank, Lower Grade (従五位下)	30,000 koku
9	Hosokawa Yukika (細川行芬)	1826–1851	Buzen-no-kami / Saemon-no-jo (豊前守、 左衛門尉)	Junior 5th Rank, Lower Grade (従五位下)	30,000 koku
10	Hosokawa Tatsunori (細川立則)	1851–1862	Yamashiro-no-kami (山城守)	Junior 5th Rank, Lower Grade (従五位下)	30,000 koku
11	Hosokawa Yukizane (細川行真)	1862–1870	Yamato-no-kami / Buzen-no-kami (大和守、豊前守)	Junior 5th Rank, Lower Grade (従五位下)	30,000 koku

== See also ==
- Abolition of the han system
- List of Han
