= Hosokawa Fujitaka =

Japanese Samurai lord (1534–1610)

- 細川 藤孝
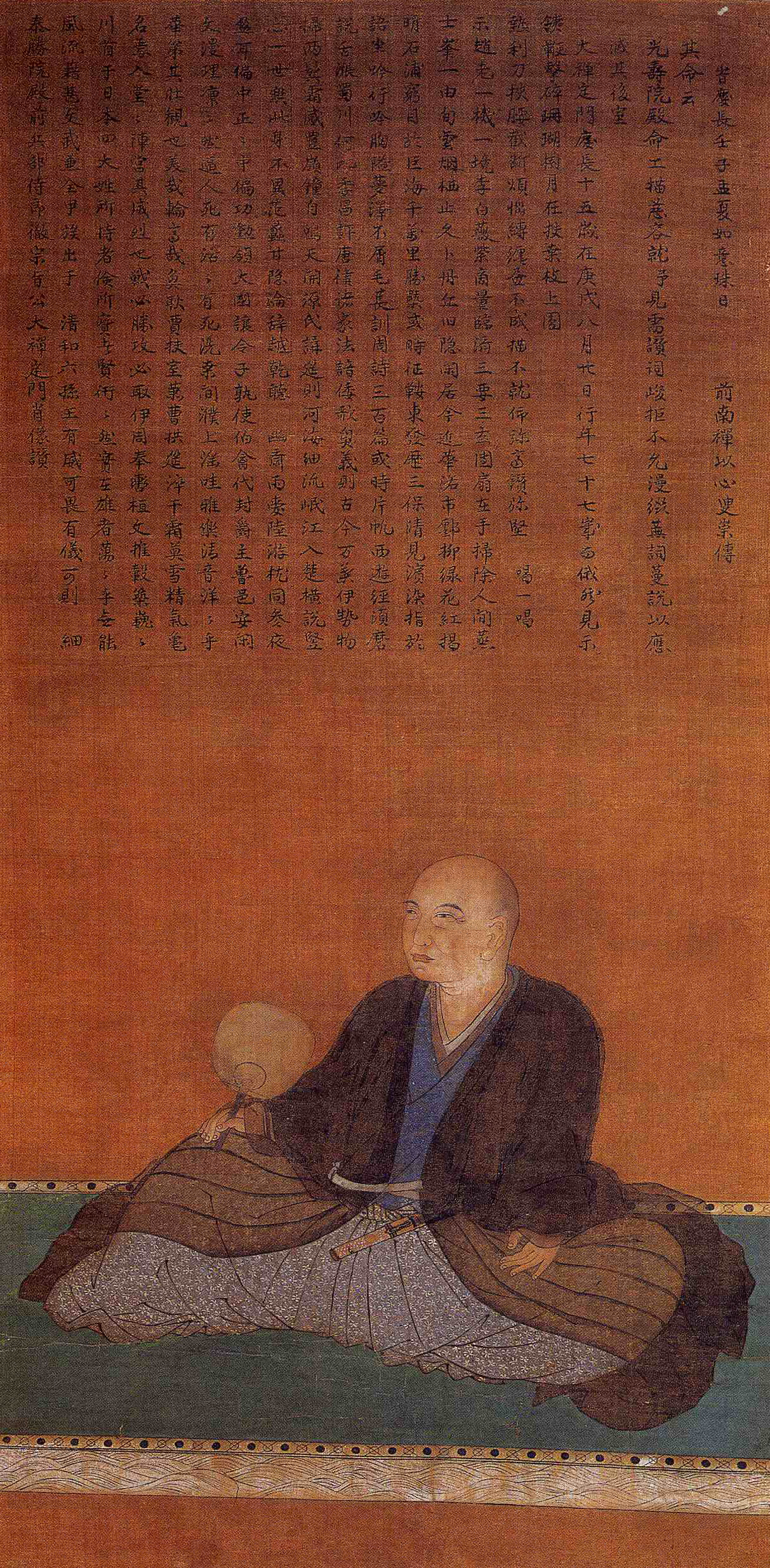

Head of Kumamoto-Hosokawa clan
- In office 1563–1582
- Succeeded by: Hosokawa Tadaoki

Lord of Tanabe
- In office 1579–1582
- Succeeded by: Hosokawa Tadaoki

Personal details
- Born: June 3, 1534 Kyoto
- Died: October 6, 1610 (aged 76) Kyoto
- Spouse: Numata Jakō
- Children: Hosokawa Tadaoki
- Nickname: Hosokawa Yūsai

Military service
- Allegiance: Ashikaga shogunate Oda clan Toyotomi clan Eastern Army
- Unit: Hosokawa clan
- Commands: Tanabe castle
- Battles/wars: Siege of Shōryūji Castle; Battle of Honkokuji; Battle of Tennoji; Siege of Shigisan; Siege of Yada Castle; Tango Campaign; Siege of Negoroji; Kyushu Campaign; Siege of Tanabe

Hosokawa Fujitaka (細川 藤孝; June 3, 1534 – October 6, 1610), also known as Hosokawa Yūsai (細川 幽斎; Japanese pronunciation: [hò̞.só̞.kä̀.β̞ä̀ (|) jɨ́ɨ̀.sä̀ì, -kä́.β̞ä́-]), was a Japanese daimyō and prominent samurai lord of the Sengoku period. A former senior retainer of Ashikaga Yoshiaki, the fifteenth and final Ashikaga shōgun, Fujitaka later aligned with Oda Nobunaga. As a reward for his service to the Oda clan, he was granted the fief of Tango Province. He subsequently rose to prominence as one of the Oda's leading generals, playing a strategic role in Nobunaga's campaigns.

== Biography ==
Hosokawa Fujitaka entered the service of Oda Nobunaga in 1568 after Nobunaga seized Kyoto. Later that year, he joined forces with Shibata Katsuie, Hachiya Yoritaka, Mori Yoshinari, and Sakai Masahisa to besiege Shōryūji Castle, where he defeated and killed its lord, Iwanari Tomomichi. The following year, when the Miyoshi clan attacked shōgun Ashikaga Yoshiaki at Honkokuji Castle, Fujitaka and Akechi Mitsuhide successfully defended the shōgun, repelling the assault.

From 1576 onward, Fujitaka played a key role in Nobunaga’s campaigns, including the decade-long Ishiyama Hongan-ji War against the Ikkō-ikki, where he fought alongside Harada Naomasa, Akechi Mitsuhide, and Araki Murashige. In 1577, he distinguished himself during the Siege of Shigisan, helping crush the rebellion of Matsunaga Hisahide, a former Oda vassal. By 1579, under Nobunaga’s orders, Fujitaka constructed Tanabe Castle as a strategic base for the conquest of Tango Province and later led Oda forces in capturing Yada Castle, prompting its lord, Isshiki Yoshimichi, to commit seppuku. Though his 1580 solo campaign in Tango initially faltered against Isshiki resistance, he secured the province with reinforcements from Akechi Mitsuhide.

Following Nobunaga’s death in the 1582 Honnō-ji Incident, Fujitaka refused to support Akechi Mitsuhide—despite their familial ties through his son Tadaoki’s marriage to Mitsuhide’s daughter, Hosokawa Gracia—during the Battle of Yamazaki. He subsequently took Buddhist vows, adopting the name Yūsai, and relinquished his daimyō title to Tadaoki. Nevertheless, he remained politically influential as a cultural advisor under Toyotomi Hideyoshi and Tokugawa Ieyasu. In 1585, he participated in the Siege of Negoroji, and Hideyoshi rewarded him in 1586 with a 3,000-koku retirement estate in Yamashiro Province. Fujitaka later served as Hideyoshi’s envoy during the 1587 Kyushu Campaign, negotiating Shimazu Yoshihisa’s surrender, and received an additional 3,000-koku stipend in Ōsumi Province in 1595.

After Hideyoshi’s death in 1598, Fujitaka joined six generals—Fukushima Masanori, Katō Yoshiaki, Ikeda Terumasa, Kuroda Nagamasa, Asano Yoshinaga, and Katō Kiyomasa—in plotting to assassinate Ishida Mitsunari, whom they accused of undervaluing their achievements during the Imjin War. The conspirators gathered at Kiyomasa’s Osaka residence before marching to Mitsunari’s home, but Mitsunari escaped after a servant of Toyotomi Hideyori, Jiemon Kuwajima, alerted him. He fled to Satake Yoshinobu’s mansion and later barricaded himself in Fushimi Castle. Tokugawa Ieyasu, then overseeing Fushimi, mediated the crisis by negotiating Mitsunari’s retirement and a review of the disputed Battle of Ulsan Castle reports, while arranging for his son Yūki Hideyasu to escort Mitsunari to Sawayama Castle. Historians regard this incident as a precursor to the 1600 Sekigahara conflict, reflecting deepening factional divides between Tokugawa loyalists and Mitsunari’s anti-Tokugawa coalition.

During the 1600 Sekigahara Campaign, Fujitaka rejected Mitsunari’s request to join the Western Army, citing Mitsunari’s role in the deaths of Gracia and his granddaughter. As an Eastern Army general, he garrisoned Tanabe Castle with 500 men. The besieging Western Army, out of respect for Fujitaka, conducted a halfhearted siege—firing blank cannon rounds at the walls. He surrendered only after Emperor Go-Yōzei issued an imperial decree, though the resolution came 19 days before the Battle of Sekigahara, precluding his participation in the decisive clash.

== Death ==
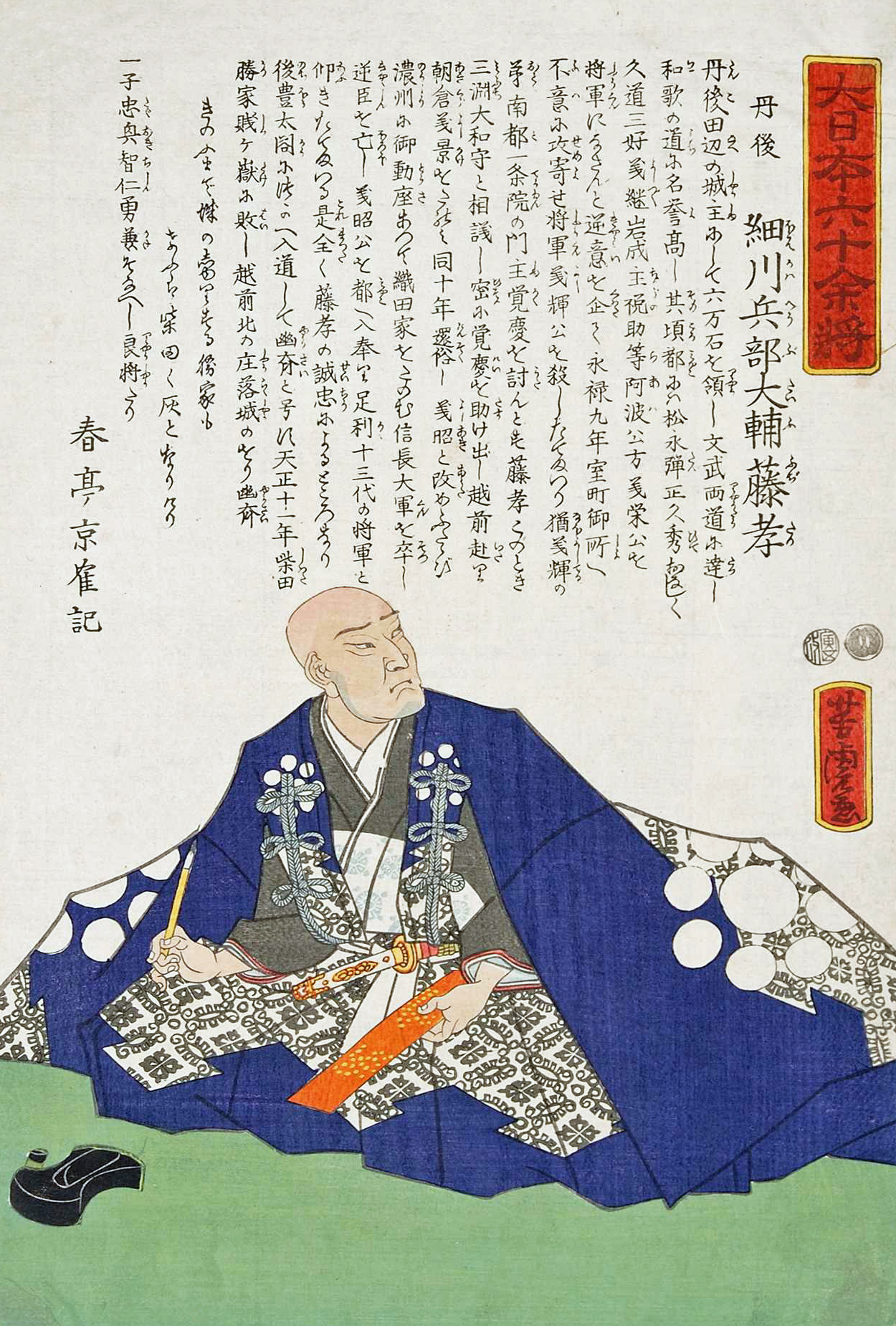
Hosokawa Fujitaka

Fujitaka died on October 6, 1610. His primary burial site is located in Kyoto, though a secondary memorial grave was later established in Kumamoto, where his grandson Hosokawa Tadatoshi ruled as daimyō.

== Family ==
Hosokawa Fujitaka was born into a samurai lineage. His grandfather, Hosokawa Motoari (1459–1500), and father, Mitsubuchi Harukazu (1500–1570), were both retainers of the Ashikaga shogunate. His mother, known by her Buddhist name Chisein, was a daughter of Rokkaku Yoshiharu. Fujitaka was adopted and raised by his uncle, Hosokawa Mototsune, head of the powerful Hosokawa clan’s Kokawa-ke branch. He married Numata Jakō (1544–1618), a poet and scholar, with whom he had eight children: four sons—Hosokawa Tadaoki (a noted daimyō), Hosokawa Okimoto (1566–1619), Hosokawa Yukitaka (1571–1607), and Hosokawa Takayuki—and four daughters (Itohime, Senhime, Kurihime, and Kagahime).

== See also ==
- Hosokawa clan
