= Numata Jakō =

Japanese noble lady

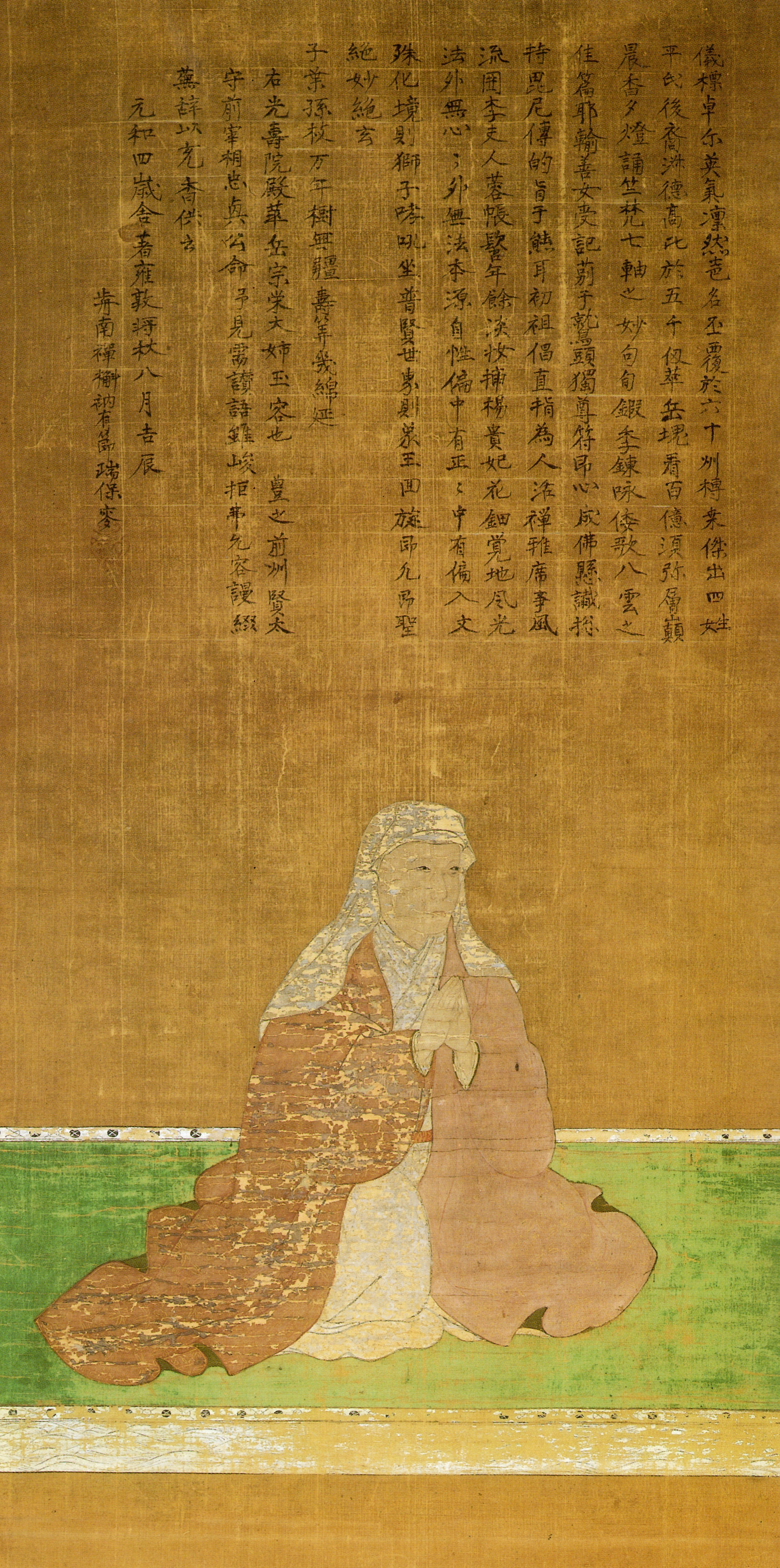
Portrait of Numata Jakō

Numata Jakō (沼田麝香, 1544 – September 4, 1618) also known as Hosokawa Maria (細川 マリア) was a Japanese noble lady of the Sengoku period. She was the wife of Hosokawa Fujitaka and mother of Hosokawa Tadaoki. She was best known for fighting and for accompanying Hosokawa Fujitaka in the siege of Tanabe during Sekigahara Campaign.

== Life ==
Jako was the daughter of the lord of Kumagawa Castle in Wakasa Province, Numata Mitsukane, who was a vassal of the Ashikaga clan. She married Fujitaka around 1562 and gave birth to Tadaoki in 1563. Influenced by her son's wife, Hosokawa Gracia, Jakō was converted to Christianity. In 1600, when Ishida Mitsunari the leader of the Western Army in Battle of Sekigahara attempted to take Gracia as a hostage, the Ogasawara Shōsai family retainer killed her, he and the rest of the house then committed seppuku and burned the mansion. After the incident Jakō was emotionally affected, days later when the western army reached the gates of the Tanabe Castle, she fought bravely alongside to her family in the siege of Tanabe.

== Siege of Tanabe ==
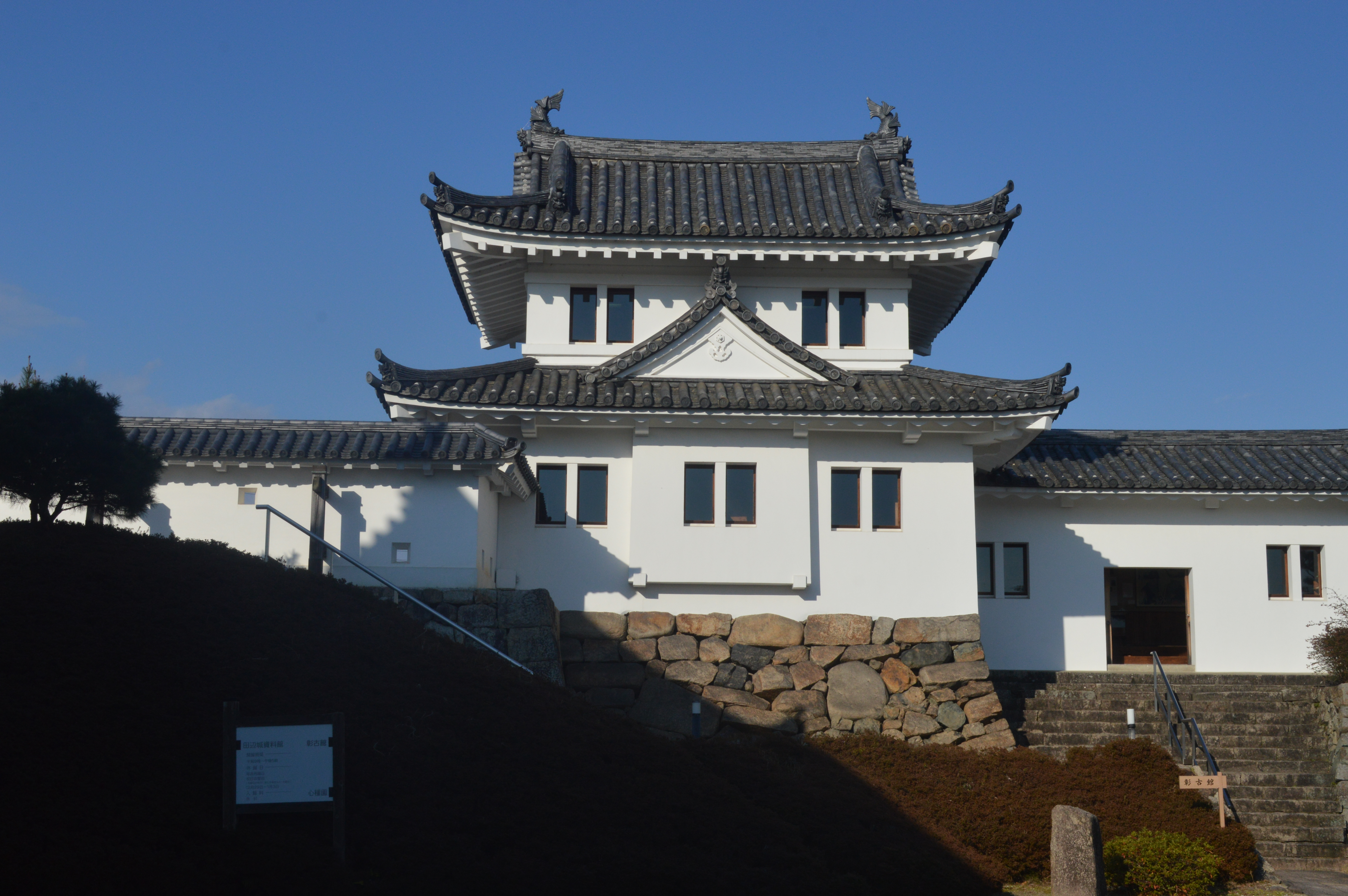
Tanabe Castle

The Hosokawa sided with Tokugawa Ieyasu (Eastern Army) against Ishida Mitsunari (Western army) during the decisive Sekigahara Campaign.

During the siege of Tanabe there were only 500 troops of Eastern army to defend the castle against the 15,000 of the Western Army. Numata Jakō was an important role throughout the siege. At night she would don her armor and make the rounds of the men on watch to buoy their spirits. She also made a diagram of the banners of those enemy units that either fired high so as not to hit anyone or fired using only powder and no musket balls. If the Hosokawa survived the siege, it would in part be because of sympathizers among the enemy force, and she wanted them spared from any post-battle retribution, resisted without truce. The general commanding the siege had great respect for Jako's husband. Because of this, the attack lacked the usual spirit involved in a samurai siege: the attackers amused themselves by shooting the walls with cannons loaded only with gunpowder. Fujitaka laid down arms only after an imperial decree from Emperor Go-Yōzei. However, this was 19 days before Battle of Sekigahara, and neither he nor his attackers were able to join the battle.

After the victory of the Eastern army in Sekigahara, Jako and her family was rewarded and praised by Tokugawa Ieyasu.

== Later life ==
After the Battle of Sekigahara, the Hosokawa clan became one of the clans loyal to the Tokugawa Shogunate. Jako's son, Hosokawa Tadaoki was awarded a fief in Buzen (Kokura, 370,000 koku) and went on to serve Tokugawa at the siege of Osaka. She survived the entire period of warring states, dying on July 16, 1618, at the age of 75, three years after the siege of Osaka. Her tomb is located in Nanzenji Temple, Kyoto City.

== Popular culture ==
- She appears as generic playable character in the series of games Samurai Warriors 4 Empires.
