= Hosokawa Tadaoki =

Japanese samurai

- 細川 忠興
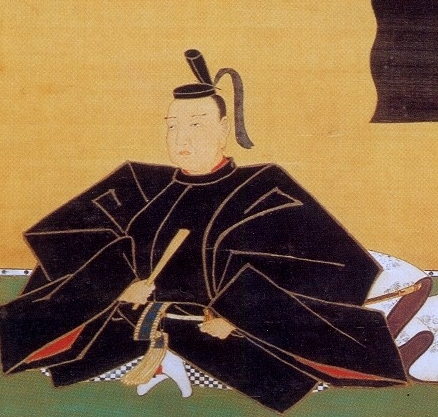

Head of Kumamoto-Hosokawa clan
- In office 1582–1620
- Preceded by: Hosokawa Fujitaka
- Succeeded by: Hosokawa Tadatoshi

Daimyō of Nakatsu
- In office 1600–1602
- Succeeded by: Ogasawara Nagatsugu

Daimyō of Kokura
- In office 1602–1620
- Succeeded by: Hosokawa Tadatoshi

Personal details
- Born: November 28, 1563
- Died: January 18, 1646 (aged 82) Daitoku-ji, Kyoto
- Spouse: Hosokawa Gracia
- Children: Hosokawa Tadatoshi; Hosokawa Tatsutaka among others
- Parents: Hosokawa Fujitaka (father); Numata Jakō (mother)

Military service
- Allegiance: Oda clan Toyotomi clan Eastern Army; Tokugawa shogunate
- Unit: Hosokawa clan
- Battles/wars: Battle of Komaki and Nagakute; Odawara Campaign; Korean campaign Battle of Sekigahara; Siege of Osaka

Hosokawa Tadaoki (細川 忠興; November 28, 1563 – January 18, 1646) was a Japanese samurai lord and daimyo of the late Sengoku period and early Edo period. He was the son of Hosokawa Fujitaka and Numata Jakō, and the husband of the famous Christian convert Hosokawa Gracia. For most of his life, he went by the name Nagaoka Tadaoki, which had been adopted by his father and was associated with a town in their domain. Shortly after the victory at Sekigahara, Nagaoka Tadaoki reverted to his original name, Hosokawa Tadaoki.

== Biography ==
The emblem (mon) of the Hosokawa clan

Tadaoki was the eldest son of Hosokawa Fujitaka. He fought in his first battle at the age of 15, in the service of Oda Nobunaga. His childhood name was Kumachiyo (熊千代). In 1580, Tadaoki was granted the Province of Tango. In 1578, he married Hosokawa Gracia, the daughter of Akechi Mitsuhide.

In 1582, Akechi Mitsuhide rebelled against Nobunaga at Honnō-ji, resulting in Nobunaga's death. Akechi then turned to Hosokawa Fujitaka and Tadaoki for assistance, but they refused to help him. Mitsuhide was ultimately defeated by Hideyoshi.

Tadaoki fought on Hideyoshi's side in the Battle of Komaki and Nagakute (1584) and the Odawara Campaign (1590), participating in the siege of Nirayama in Izu Province before joining the main army outside Odawara. During the 1590s, he developed a friendship with Tokugawa Ieyasu, who had lent him money to help pay off debts owed to Toyotomi Hidetsugu. In 1600, Tadaoki sided with Ieyasu against Ishida Mitsunari.

He was succeeded by his son, Hosokawa Tadatoshi (1586–1641), who participated in the Siege of Shimabara (1637–1638). In 1632, Tadatoshi received a significant fief in Higo (Kumamoto, 540,000 koku), where the Hosokawa family remained until 1871.

=== Conflict with Ishida Mitsunari ===
According to popular theory, in 1598, following the death of Toyotomi Hideyoshi, the government of Japan experienced a significant incident in which seven military generals—Fukushima Masanori, Katō Kiyomasa, Ikeda Terumasa, Hosokawa Tadaoki, Asano Yoshinaga, Katō Yoshiaki, and Kuroda Nagamasa—conspired to kill Ishida Mitsunari. Their conspiracy stemmed from the generals' dissatisfaction with Mitsunari, who had written unfavorable assessments and downplayed their achievements during the Imjin War against Korea and the Chinese empire. However, Mitsunari learned of their plans through a report from Jiemon Kuwajima, a servant of Toyotomi Hideyori, and fled to Satake Yoshinobu's mansion with Shima Sakon and others to hide.

When the seven generals discovered that Mitsunari was absent from his mansion, they searched the residences of various feudal lords in Osaka Castle, while Katō's army also approached the Satake residence. Consequently, Mitsunari and his companions escaped from the Satake residence and barricaded themselves in Fushimi Castle. The following day, the seven generals surrounded Fushimi Castle with their soldiers, aware that Mitsunari was hiding there. Tokugawa Ieyasu, who was in charge of political affairs at Fushimi Castle, attempted to mediate the situation. The seven generals demanded that Ieyasu hand over Mitsunari, but he refused. Instead, he negotiated, promising to allow Mitsunari to retire and to review the assessment of the Battle of Ulsan Castle in Korea, which had been a major point of contention. Ieyasu then sent his second son, Yūki Hideyasu, to escort Mitsunari to Sawayama Castle. However, historian Daimon Watanabe, drawing from primary and secondary sources regarding the incident, argued that this was more of a legal conflict between the generals and Mitsunari, rather than a conspiracy to murder him. Ieyasu's role was not to physically protect Mitsunari from harm but to mediate the complaints of the generals.

Nevertheless, historians view this incident as more than a personal conflict between the seven generals and Mitsunari. It was an extension of the broader political rivalries between the Tokugawa faction and the anti-Tokugawa faction led by Mitsunari. Following this incident, the military figures who were at odds with Mitsunari later supported Ieyasu during the Sekigahara conflict between the Eastern army, led by Tokugawa Ieyasu, and the Western army, led by Ishida Mitsunari. Historian Shunkichi Muramatsu believes Mitsunari's failure in his war against Ieyasu was due to his unpopularity among the major political figures of that time.

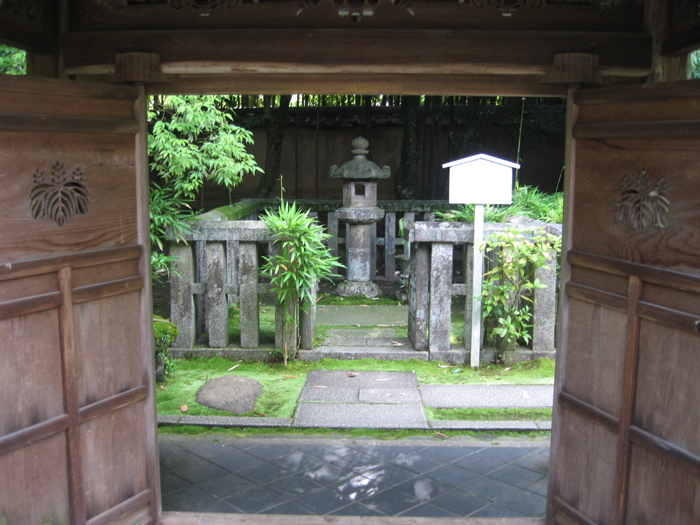
Grave of Tadaoki and his wife Gracia, at Daitokuji, Kyoto

== Battle of Sekigahara ==
In July 1600, Ishida Mitsunari attempted to gain leverage over those leaning towards Ieyasu by taking hostages from families residing in Osaka Castle. This included Tadaoki's wife, who had since converted to Christianity and was baptized as "Gracia". To avoid capture, Hosokawa Gracia ordered a servant to kill her and set fire to their quarters. Mitsunari's actions were regarded as an appalling act of trickery, ultimately driving Tadaoki to Ieyasu's side.

On October 20, 1600, at the Battle of Sekigahara, Tadaoki commanded 5,000 men in the Tokugawa vanguard, clashing with the forces of Shima Sakon. Subsequently, he was awarded a fief in Buzen (Kokura, 370,000 koku) and went on to serve in the Siege of Osaka (1614–1615).

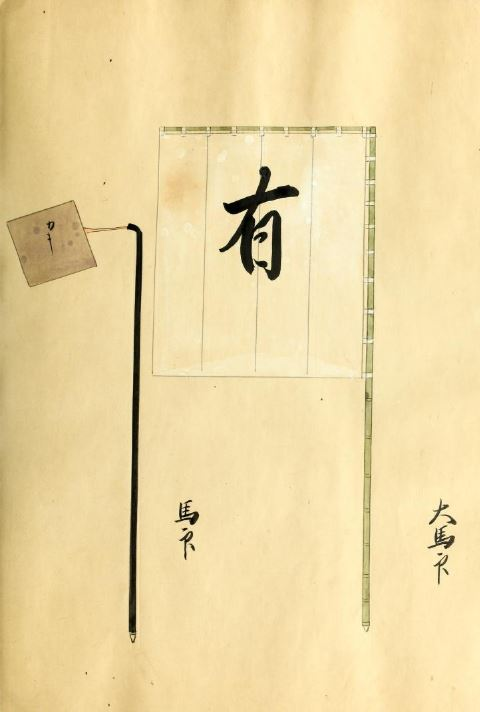
Hosokawa Tadaoki Battle standards

== Family ==
- Father: Hosokawa Fujitaka
- Mother: Numata Jako (1544–1618)
- Wife: Hosokawa Gracia
- Concubines:
  - Daughter of Kori Muneyasu
  - Daughter of Akechi Mitsutada
  - Daughter of Kiyota Mamoru
  - Daughter of Masashi Shimamoto
- Children:
  - Hosokawa Tadataka (1580–1646) by Hosokawa Gracia
  - Hosokawa Okiaki (1583–1615) by Hosokawa Gracia
  - Hosokawa Tadatoshi by Hosokawa Gracia
  - Hosokawa Okitaka
  - Hosokawa Tatsutaka by daughter of Kiyota Mamoru
  - Matsui Yoriyuki
  - Ocho married Maeno Kagesada by Hosokawa Gracia
  - Otara married Inaba Kazumichi by Hosokawa Gracia
  - Koho married Matsui Okinaga
  - Oman married Karasuma Mitsukata

== Retainers ==
- Ujii Yashiro

== See also ==
- Hosokawa clan
- Sasaki Kojirō
- Hosokawa Tadatoshi

Preceded by none	Daimyō of Nakatsu; 1600–1602	Succeeded by Ogasawara Nagatsugu
Preceded by none	Daimyō of Kokura; 1602–1620	Succeeded by Hosokawa Tadatoshi
