= The Great Festival of Fujisaki Hachimangu Shrine =

Festival in Japan

The Great Festival of Fujisaki Hachimangu Shrine is a festival of Fujisaki-hachimangu at Chūō-ku, Kumamoto every September, characterized by a parade of Shinto priests, followed by groups of followers who chase their horses shouting, "Boshita, Boshita", in earlier times; but now the parade followers, "Dookai Dookai", or other phrases. Recently 17,000 people participated in this festival.

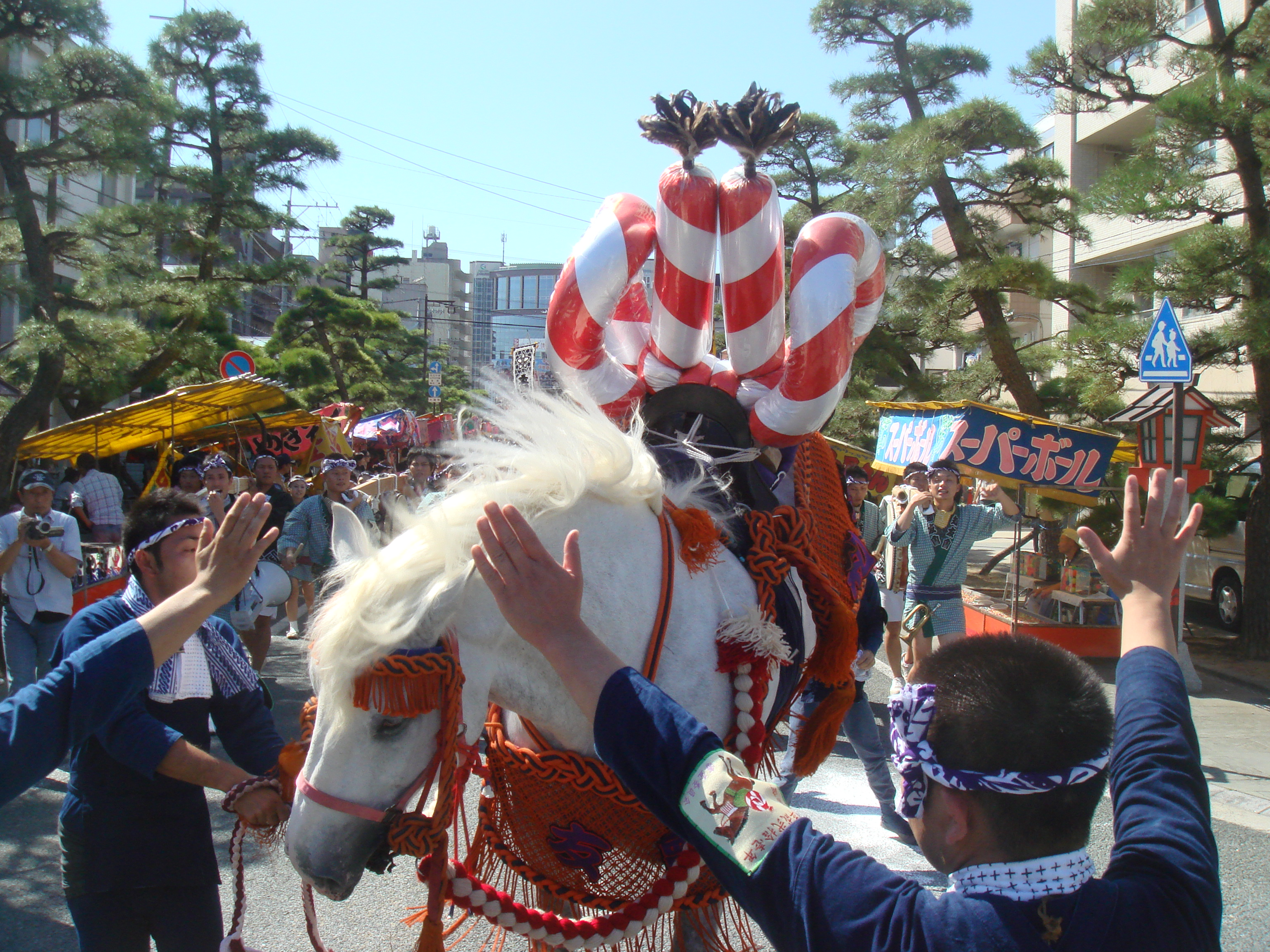
Fujisaki Hachimangu Autumn Festival

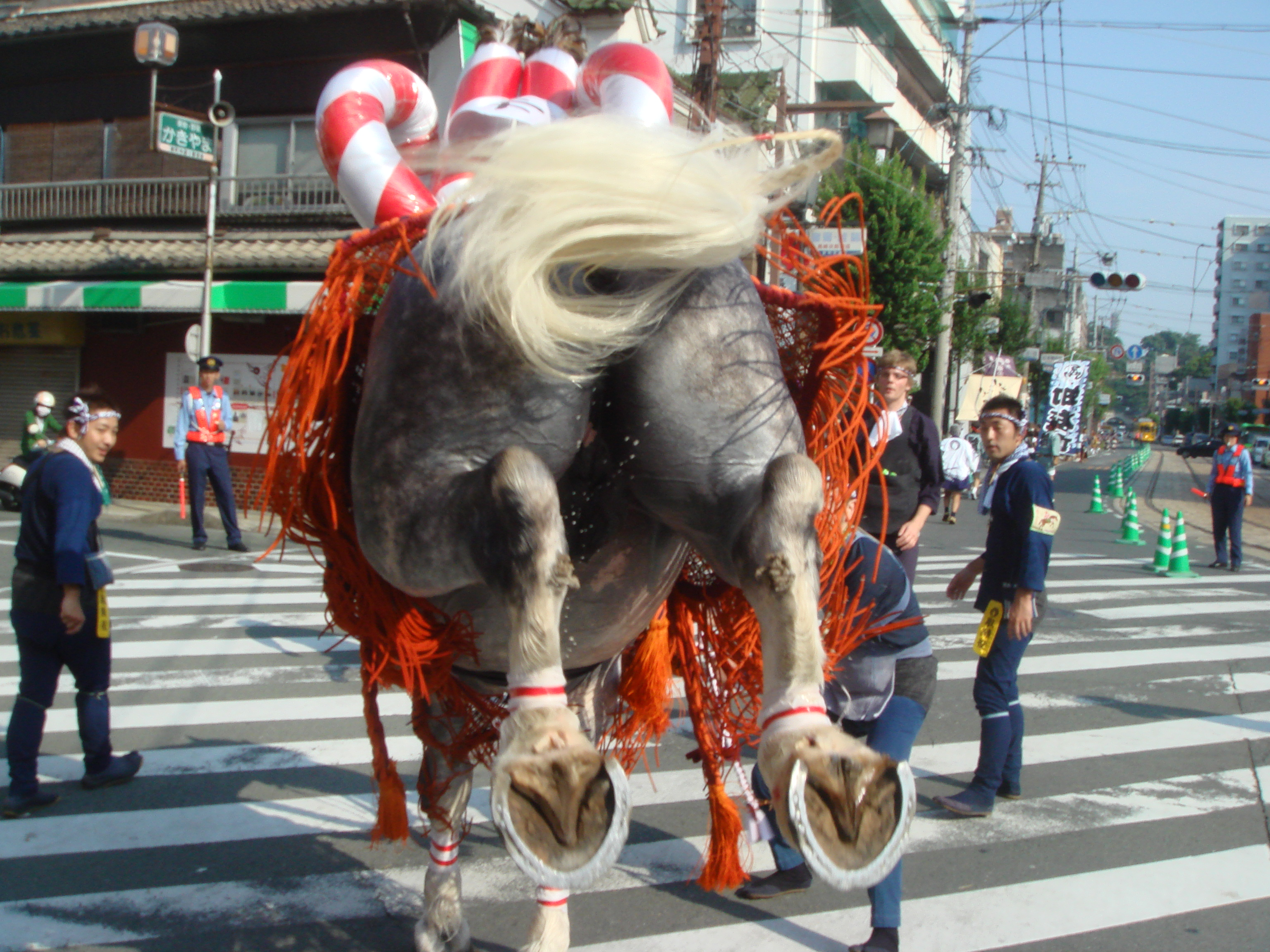
Fujisaki Hachimangu Autumn Festival, taken by a person of horse chasing

== Name ==
The formal name of this festival is 藤崎八旛宮秋季例大祭, or Fujisaki-hachimangu, autumn great festival. Previously it was called Boshita Matsuri in Japanese, though it is not used officially, because of a view that this comes from "Horoboshita," or Japan destroyed Korea, although Korea was not in the shouting phrase. However, there are other views, as described below in the section entitled Controversy.

The origin of Boshita is not known; decorated horses were not employed, and there was no horse chasing at the time of Katō Kiyomasa. A view states that it had been used since the First Sino-Japanese War. The use of Boshita was claimed at the time of world exhibition at Osaka in 1970, since Japanese of Korean origin felt miserable at the time of the festival. New shouting phrases have been up to the groups which participate; it was decided upon in August 1990.

== Parade of Shinto priests ==
The climax of the autumn great festival of Fujisaki-hachimangu comes on the last day of the festival. It consists of the parade of portable shrines, followed by a parade of samurai re-enactors, and a parade of decorated horses, chased by many followers.

== History ==
This festival originated in Ho-jo-e (the ritual for releasing living beings), a festival of letting wild animals go into the fields, a Buddhist custom, but which was introduced to the Shinto shrines and of which, Ho-jo-e of Iwashimizu Hachiman-gū, Kyoto is well known. The Kami of Fujisaki Hachimangu came from Iwashimizu Hachiman-gū. However, no trace of Ho-jo-e can be found in the present festival.

The Zuibyo, or parade of following samurai, certainly originated from the returning samurai of Katō Kiyomasa from Korea during the Japanese invasions of Korea (1592-1598). Katō Kiyomasa thanked the Kami of the Fujisaki-hachimangu for the safe return by leading the parade of his followers. This custom continued into the Hosokawa clan period, with three important samurai figures: head of followers, head of spears, parade head.

The decorated horses were originally those for Shinto priests (kannushi), twelve in number, and in the Hosokawa clan period, only upper-class samurai families presented horses. The distance from the shrine to the otabisho (destination of the parade) was short, and kannushi did not ride on the horses. Therefore, the decorations on the horses became gradually gala and greater. The decorations on the horses were originally from the symbols of sexual organs. There had been two schools, but only Ando school has been observed. After the Meiji Restoration, decorated horses were prepared by town people, and recently the decorated horses number about 60. In 2007, the horses numbered 67, and following people (seko) numbered 17,000, indicating that this is the biggest festival of Kumamoto city.

== Number of horse chasing groups ==
year	Number of groups	year	Number of groups
1962	9	1974	12
1963	8	1975	18
1964	5	1976	19
1965	6	1977	21
1966	5	1978	25
1967	7	1979	28
1968	11	1980	34
1969	13	1981	44
1970	12	1982	53
1971	5	1983	54
1972	6	1984	48
1973	6	1985	51

== The Festival ==
The festival continues for 5 days. On the first day, the head of Fujisakigu believers prays, and there are ceremonies of lion dance dress purification, musical instrument purification and purification of various instruments.

On the next day, there are a tea dedication ceremony and a haiku dedication ceremony. On the third day, Kenpei Sai (a divine ceremony), dedication of Japanese traditional fighting matches such as fencing, and dedication of traditional Japanese dancing. On the fourth day, purification and decorations of horses, dedication of flower arrangement and travelling portable shrines.

On the fifth day is the parade, headed by kannushi, starting at 6 a.m. (starting ceremony), three portable shrines, parades of followers, lion dances, portable shrines carried by children, and finally the groups of decorated horses. Decorated horse group people are dressed in uniforms of their own, dancing with folding fans, drums, trumpets, shouting "Dookai Dookai" (meaning "how about this?"), chasing the decorated horse of their group. Some horses run violently and sometimes injure people nearby. These groups are from town groups, companies, and graduates of schools and other groups.

The order of the parade is determined by drawing lots. Exceptions are the top three groups which exist near the shrine; which must do preparations and cleanup after the festival.

== Controversy ==
=== Korean language ===
The phrase "Boshita Boshita" originated in the Korean language. A book entitled History of Kumamoto city, published in 1932, wrote that "Ehekoroboshita" was used as the shouting phrase which came from the Korean language. A Korean association in Kumamoto said that it might mean a great man (Toyotomi Hideyoshi) died.

=== Erotic origin ===
The Boshita Boshita was short of Boboshita (did sex) view. In a document by a kannushi of the shrine written in 1870, "Boboshita boboshita was the phrase of horse chasing". Another document written in 1865 "Boboshita Boboshita(did sex) was the phrase of horse chasing".

=== Japan destroyed Korea ===
The latter document added that it might be a mistake of Horoboshita. In a letter by Lafcadio Hearn, he wrote that he heard the shouting phrase Korea was destroyed many times, and in a newspaper during World War two that the Japanese people should understand that Japan destroyed Korea, apparently to whip up war sentiment.

=== 1970 Osaka World Exposition ===
Kumamoto City was going to exhibit a Boshita parade at the 1970 Osaka World Exposition but criticism arose concerning the name of the Boshita festival, since it may mean Japan destroyed Korea. The Osaka World Exposition rejected the Boshita parade. Since then, the problem of the shouting phrase of Boshita had been under discussion.

=== 1989 dispute ===
This problem was again under fire since the Yomiuri newspaper introduced the Boshita festival in a Korean language book in December 1989. In August, 1990, the Fujisaki shrine audit committee published that it would rate a minus point if a group shouted Boshita. This was reported substantially stopping the shouting of Boshita.

=== Present status ===
Many Kumamoto people use of the word Boshita Festival even today, but they do not use "Boshita Boshita" at horse chasing. Some miss the word Boshita even today.

== See also ==
- History of Kumamoto Prefecture
