= Kengun Shrine =

Kengun Shrine 健軍神社
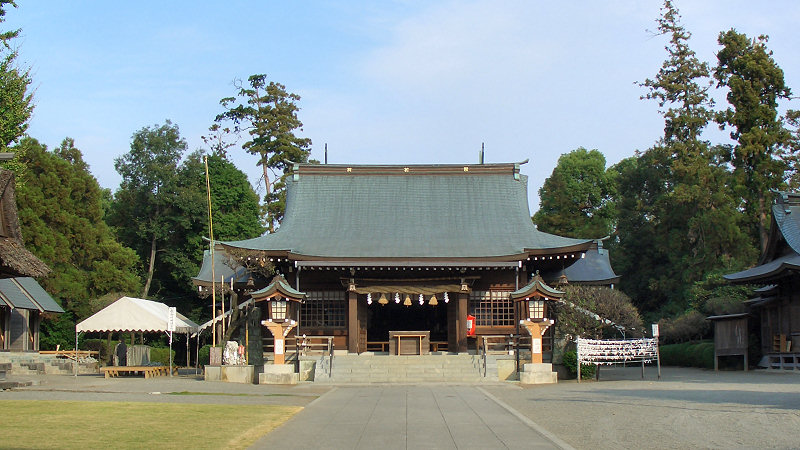
- Kengun Shrine

- Location within Japan

Religion
- Affiliation: Shinto
- Deity: 健緒組命(takeogunino-mikoto),健磐龍命,阿蘇都比賣命 and others
- Type: Prefectural Shrine

Location
- Location: 13-1 Kengun Honmachi, Higashi-ku, Kumamoto-shi
- Interactive map of Kengun Shrine 健軍神社
- Coordinates: 32°47′05″N 130°45′19″E

Architecture
- Founder: Kokushi (official) of Kumamoto
- Established: the era of Emperor Keikō or Emperor Kinmei

Kengun Shrine (健軍神社) is the oldest traditional shrine in Kumamoto City, Kumamoto Prefecture, Japan. It is one of the 4 shrines of Aso Shrine group (Aso Shrine, Kohsa Shrine and Kohnoura Shrine).

== History ==
=== Legend ===
- According to a legend, Emperor Keikō ordered 健緒組命 (Takeogumino-mikoto) to conquer enemies who were around Mt. Choraina or Chorainasan (at Mashiki ?). He succeeded and was enshrined. (Local kami or shrine called ubugamisama might be there)
- According to an old document, this shrine was built in the 19th year of Emperor Kinmei (欽明天皇 Kinmei-tennō, 509–571), the 29th emperor of Japan. A governor of Higo Province, now Kumamoto, Kumamoto was on his way to Aso Shrine to pray for his country, but heavy snow prevented him from going to Aso. A boy, about 3-years of age, appeared to him and said, "Your faith in Aso God is very deep, and you are going to Aso in spite of heavy snow. You should build a shrine here, since Aso Shrine was busy with the defense of the emperor who is east, while you must defend this place against enemies west, so the name should be Kengun.

=== 13 kami are enshrined ===
- The main kami is Kengun Ohkami(Take-ogumino-mikoto), who was a related kami of Aso Shrine. The name of kami is 健緒組命 and 健 is also called Ken. Other kami are 健磐龍命,阿蘇都比賣命 and others. They came by Bunrei from Aso Shrine.

=== Satsuma Rebellion ===
- On February 22, 1877, 1400 Samurais decided to side with the Satsuma Rebellion force in the Kengun Shrine area and formed a Kumamoto Company and they started to fight against the Kumamoto Castle. At the Satsuma Rebellion, the kami of burnt Katō Shrine and kami of burnt Fujisaki Hachimangū were transiently relocated at the Kengun Shrine.

== Small Shrines and Road to the Shrine ==
- Amemiya Shrine:Amemiya Ohkami is enshrined. Here a ceremony is held for rainfall.
- Miwa Shrine:Ohmononushi-Ohkami and others are enshrined for the prevention and cure of smallpox. People touch a stone there with depressions resembling smallpox scars and will gain some improvement or profit.
- Kokuzou Shrine:A relocated shrine due to the construction of the streetcar road. Its origin is not available.
- Hiyoshi Shrine:Here they pray for the prevention of fires. A relocated shrine due to the city planning law.
- Tensha Shrine:Tensha Ohkami is enshrined. A relocated shrine due to the city planning law.
- Hatchou-baba:800 meter-long road to the Shrine. There is a torii at the front.

== Cultural Properties of Japan ==
- Higo Kagura or local Shinto theatrical dance: (prefectural properties)
- Cryptomeria road (800 meters long) for horse riding :(city properties)
- Kengun Shrine area :(city properties)

== See also ==
- History of Kumamoto Prefecture
