= Tairoin Hospital =

Hospital in Kumamoto, Japan

Coordinates: 32°48′44″N 130°41′25″E

Tairoin Hospital is a hospital for leprosy patients initiated by Jean Marie Corre (1850–1911) in Shimasaki Machi Kumamoto shi, Kumamoto Prefecture, Japan, in 1898, initially hospitalizing patients who gathered around Honmyoji Temple. He was a member of M.E.P. or "Missions Etrangères de Paris". The hospital started with the arrival of 5 sisters from the "Franciscan Missionaries of Mary" in 1898. The name of the hospital was changed to Biwazaki Tairo Hospital in 1952, and then to Tairo Clinic in 1996. The number of in-patients was 121 in 1948, and was 8 in 2008.

== History ==
In 1898, Biwazaki Sanatorium (Leprosy Hospital) was established by Father Jean Marie Corre, a French priest. Corre had been born in Brittany, France, in 1850. After being ordained to the priesthood, he came to Nagasaki, Kyushu (Japan), at the age of 26. He was greatly moved at the sights of leprosy patients and other poor people around the Honmyoji temple in Kumamoto. They were making a bare living by the charitable contributions of people who visited the temple. First, he built a church in Tetori, central Kumamoto, and then rented a house near Honmyoji temple. In 1896, he bought a large lot at Biwasaki. He was exhausted helping and caring patients there with the help of other people, and finally he appealed to Rome for help in order to expand his project. Five nuns were dispatched from the Franciscan Maiisonaries of Mary in Rome.

Jean Marie Corre came to Nagasaki and was sent to Kumamoto in 1889, as the head of the southern Kyushu Section of "Missions Etrangères de Paris" (M.E.P.) and established the Tetori Church.

In 1897, Corre obtained land at Nakaomaru near Honmyoji Temple and started to treat leprosy patients in two houses with 2 sisters and 2 missionaries, but he was exhausted and he requested the help of Marie de la Passion of " Franciscan Missionaries of Mary" (F.M.M.) in 1897. On October 19, upon request, five sisters arrived, and this day was made the day of establishment. The first director was Marie Colombe de Jesuis. On November 3, 1898, treatment started. The five sisters who helped start the hospital were Marie Colombe de Jesuis, Marie Beata de Immaculee Conception, Marie de la Purete, Marie Annick, and Marie Trifine. In 2010, names of 31 foreigners and 67 Japanese patients were listed on the walls of the Tairoin Hospital.

On October 23, 1901, a hospital was newly built in Biwazaki, as the Biwazaki Sanatorium. The opening ceremony was attended by the head of Nagasaki church area, Corre, plus a representative of M.E.P., Kumamoto Prefecture governor, the financial section head of the prefecture, representatives of the Army and Police, and physicians. In 1906 Corre was given the "Blue Ribbon Medal". On February 9, 1911, Corre died in Tetori Church. At this time a practicing physician treated patients twice a week. Public Kyushu Sanatorium opened in 1909, and its physicians came to Tairoin and exchanged experiences. In 1945: 10 foreign sisters were sent to Hikosan Camp (the border of Fukuoka and Oita Prefectures). In 1952 it was renamed as the Biwazaki Tairo Hospital. On June 18, 1963 at 1.40 am the hospital was burnt; with the fire-fighting of 5 sisters no one was hurt and in 1964 the hospital was reconstructed. In 1996 the hospital was renamed as the Tairoin Clinic.

== Number of In-Patients ==
Year	Number of in-patients
1898	35
1908	40
1918	45
1928	75
1938	83
1948	121
1958	70
1968	51
1978	29
1988	20
1998	13
2008	8

== See also ==
- history of Kumamoto Prefecture
- Leprosy in Japan

== Sources ==
- Tairoin(1998) Shakaifukushihojin Seibokai, Kumamoto
- Hyakunen no Seiso(2009) Kikuchi Keifuen Sanatorium, Kumamoto
- "Biwazaki Leprosarium - A century of dedication" (1992). Itakura K. Jpn Journal Leprosy 61:112-116.
