= Souha Hatono =

Japanese physician

Souha Hatono VIII or Sōha Hatono VIII
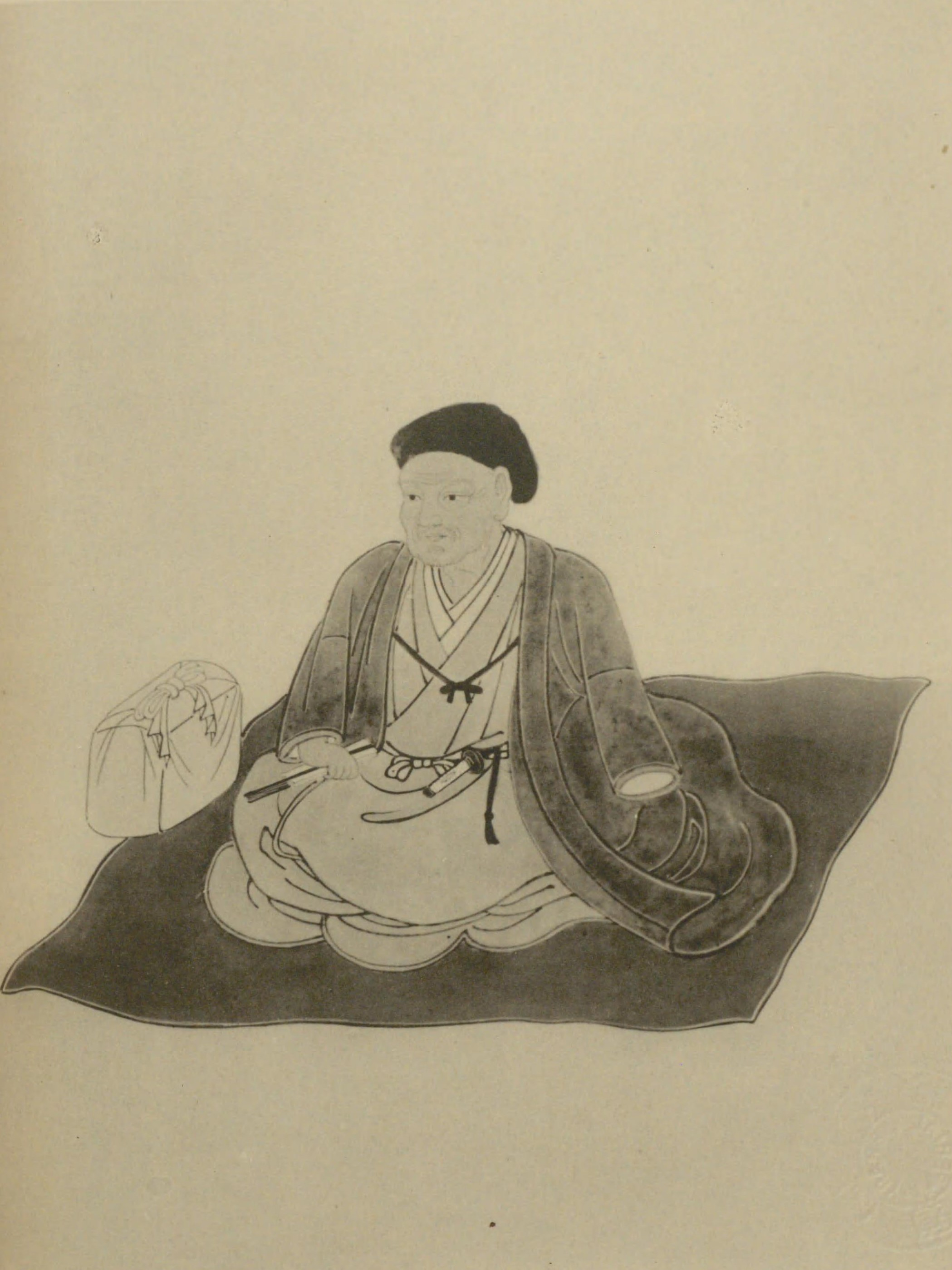
- Born: 1844; Kumamoto Kumamoto Prefecture, Japan
- Died: 1917 (aged 72–73)
- Occupation: Physician (Surgeon)
- Known for: Treating both sides at the Satsuma Rebellion (1877) equally, in accord with the spirit of International Red Cross.

Souha Hatono VIII of Japan (the 8th) (鳩野宗巴8世) (1844–1917) or Sōha Hatono was a Japanese physician specializing in surgery. He treated wounded soldiers of both sides equally in the Satsuma rebellion (1877) which was fought between Satsuma and the new Imperial Government. He faced a trial for trying to benefit the enemy, but was proved innocent. His activities were in accord with the spirit of International Red Cross and Red Crescent Movement.

== Sōha Hatono VIII of Japan ==
- He was born to a family of physicians in Kumamoto, Kyushu, Japan in 1844. Souha Hatono I (1641–1697) was said to sail to Netherlands without permission and studied medicine. Souda Hatono VII studied surgery of Hanaoka school of Hanaoka Seishū and taught medicine at the family's private school. Sōha Hatono VIII was the son of Sōha Hatono VII and was given an award for treating 300 wounded soldiers at the Battle of Ueno in 1868 in Tokyo.

== Satsuma Rebellion ==
- In 1877, a civil war broke between the government and Satsuma which had dissatisfaction of the new imperial government, and Kumamoto became the battlefield. Hatono was violently demanded to treat the wounded soldiers of the Satsuma army, but he replied that the request was accepted on the condition that soldiers of the both sides, as well as citizens, were treated equally on February 23, 1877. The Satsuma leaders accepted the condition. He immediately opened hospitals with the physicians of the Kumamoto province and hospitalized 200 persons at schools, temples and private houses. Later, Hatono was tried for possibly benefiting the enemy by the government temporal court, but he was freed without sentence three days later. A document left in his house indicated that Hatono had no intention of benefiting the enemy.

== Forerunners of the Red Cross ==
- Hatono's activities were in accord with the spirit of the International Red Cross and Red Crescent Movement.

=== Ryoun Takamatsu ===
- At the time of the Battle of Hakodate (1868–1869), Ryou-un Takamatsu treated both sides equally; the remnants of the Tokugawa shogunate army, and the armies of the newly formed Imperial government (composed mainly of forces of the Chōshū and the Satsuma domains).

=== Sano Tsunetami ===
In May, 1877, Sano Tsunetami created the Hakuaisha, a relief organization to provide medical assistance to soldiers wounded in the Satsuma Rebellion. This organization became the Japanese Red Cross Society in 1887, with Sano as its first president.

== Hatono's impact ==
It was apparent that the activities of Hatono were the forerunners of the Red Cross in Japan. The first appeal for the establishment of the Hakuaisha (which later became Japan Red Cross) was made on May 1, 1977 by Sano Tsunetami and the day of the establishment of the Japan Red Cross is May 1, while the start of the activities was on May 3, at Shonenji Temple, Gyokuto-son, Tamanagun, Kumamoto. On the contrary, Hatono started his activities on February 23, at the Umekiko of Takahira, Shimizu, Kumamoto. According to the following newspaper, it was because his activities were not reported to the central government.

In 1998, a nonprofit organization in honor of the place of the origin of the Red Cross activities was approved in Kumamoto.
