= Fujisaki Hachimangū =

Shinto shrine

Fujisaki Hachiman-gū 藤崎八幡宮
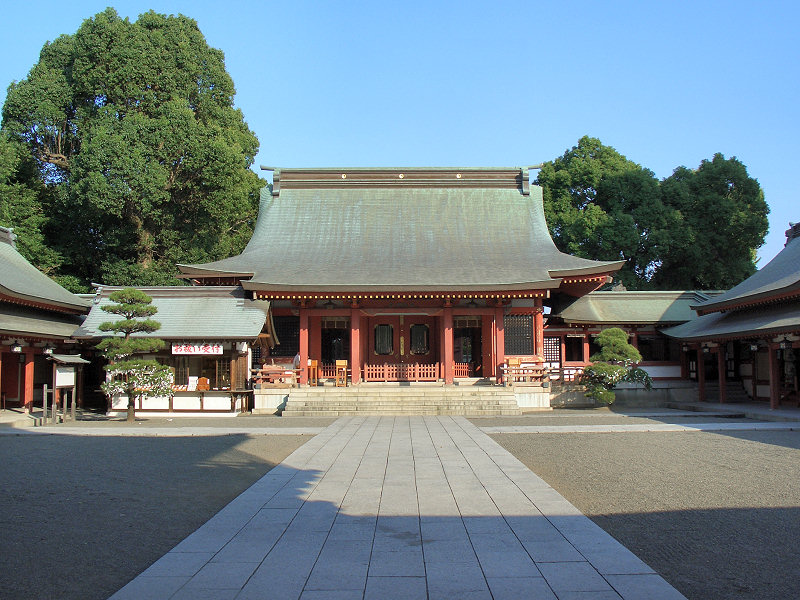
- The honden, or main shrine

- Location within Japan

Religion
- Affiliation: Shinto
- Deity: Emperor Ōjin; Empress Jingū; Sumiyoshi Sanjin

Location
- Location: Igawabuchi-machi, Chūō-ku, Kumamoto; Kumamoto 860-0841
- Interactive map of Fujisaki Hachiman-gū 藤崎八幡宮
- Coordinates: 32°48′30″N 130°43′07″E

Architecture
- Established: 935

Website
- fujisakigu.or.jp

Fujisaki Hachiman-gū (藤崎八幡宮) is a Shinto shrine located in Chūō-ku, Kumamoto, Kumamoto, Japan. It is dedicated to Emperor Ōjin, Empress Jingū and Sumiyoshi Sanjin.

== History ==
In 935, Fujisaki Hachimangu was established with the Bunrei of Iwashimizu Hachiman-gū Kyoto, at Chausuyama (now Kumamoto Fujisakidai Baseball Stadium), Kumamoto Castle at the order of Emperor Suzaku. The word Fuji derives from a tale that at the time of establishment, sticking of fuji resulted in fuji Wisteria taking root and grew. Fujisaki Hachimangu has been respected as the defender of Higo, Kumamoto Prefecture. In 1542, Emperor Go-Nara presented a wooden frame 八幡藤崎宮 which is now engraved over the Torii. Rebuilding of the shrine, 20 years apart, had been made with the order of the Emperor.

In 1877, the shrine was burnt amid the battle of Satsuma Rebellion and was reconstructed at Igawabuchi Machi, the present location. In the modern system of ranked Shinto Shrines, Fujisaki was listed in 1915 among the 3rd class of nationally significant shrines or kokuhei-shōsha (国幣小社). In 1952, the shrine was designated a religious corporation.

== Great Festival ==
Of the events of the shrine, most known is the parade of Kami with horses in September. This had been called Boshita Festival because seko (followers) followed dancing horses, shouting, "Boshita, boshita." However, this reminded some people of the term "Horoboshita," a phrase or slogan which loosely meant "Korea is destroyed," and supposedly used during the Imjin Wars of the 1590s, when Katō Kiyomasa was part of a campaign to conquer Korea. Now the festival attendants shout, "Doukai, doukai."

== Treasures ==
- A wooden sitting Hachiman statue and a female god statue are designated as Important Cultural Properties of Japan

. There are old documents, swords and other weapons.

== See also ==
- Katou Shrine
- List of Shinto shrines
